= List of state highways in Maryland shorter than one mile (800–899) =

Highway names
- Interstates: Interstate X (I-X)
- US Highways: U.S. Route X (US X)
- State: Maryland Route X (MD X)

System links
- Maryland highway system; Interstate; US; State; Scenic Byways
- Short; 2–699; 700–799; 800–899; 900–999

The following is a list of state highways in Maryland shorter than one mile (1.6 km) in length with route numbers between 800 and 899. Most of these highways act as service roads, old alignments of more prominent highways, or connectors between one or more highways. Many of these highways are unsigned and have multiple segments with the same number. Several of these highways have their own articles; those highways are summarized here and a link is provided to the main article. This list does not include highways where at least one highway of that number is at least one mile in length. All highways at least one mile in length have their own article. The highways shorter than one mile with the same number are covered in the main article for the highway.

== MD 804 ==
Maryland Route 804
- Location: Chewsville
- Length: 0.79 mi (1,270 m)

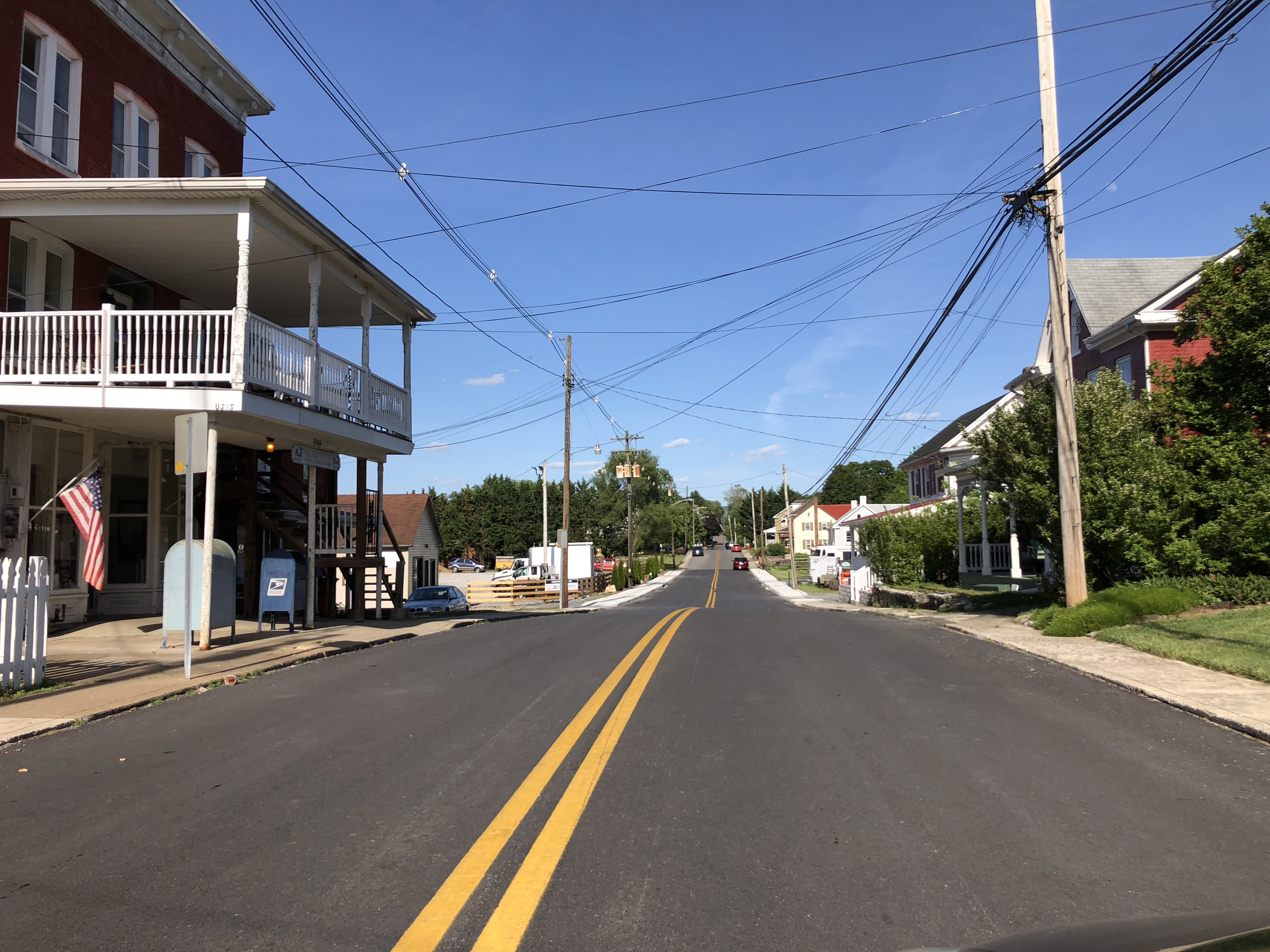
View east along MD 804 in Chewsville

Maryland Route 804 (officially MD 804B) is the unsigned designation for a 0.79-mile (1.27 km) section of old alignment of MD 64 through Chewsville. The state highway follows Track Side Drive from the western junction with MD 64 to MD 62 and Twin Springs Drive from MD 62 to the eastern intersection with MD 64.

Browse numbered routes
← MD 802	→ MD 805

== MD 805 ==
Maryland Route 805
- Location: Leitersburg
- Length: 0.15 mi (240 m)

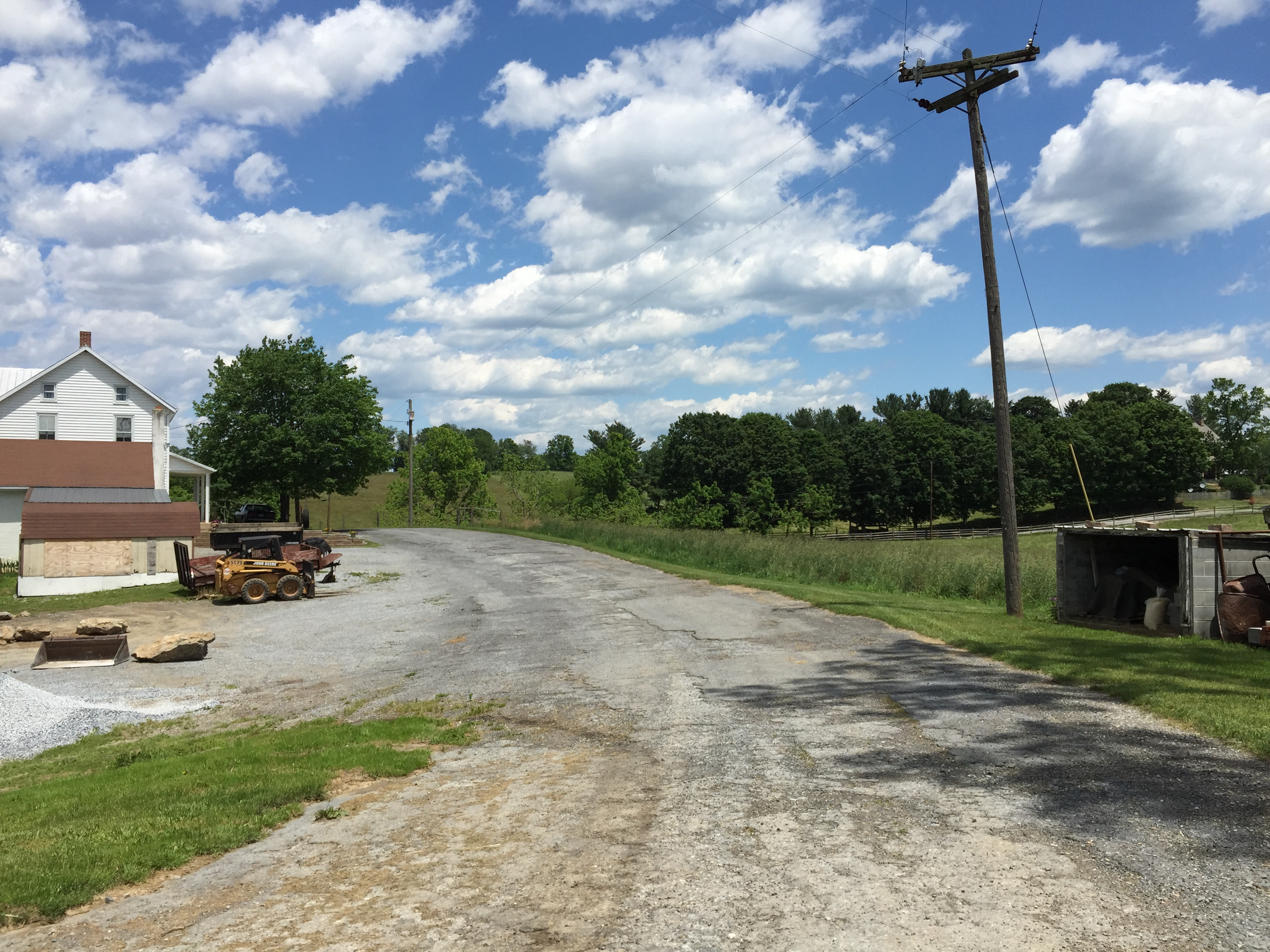
View north at the south end of MD 805B near Leitersburg

Maryland Route 805 (officially MD 805B) is the unsigned designation for an unnamed 0.15-mile (0.24 km) section of old alignment of MD 60 from a dead end north to Rocky Forge Road on the northbound side of MD 60 just south of the Pennsylvania state line near Leitersburg.

Browse numbered routes
← MD 804	→ MD 806

== MD 810 ==
Maryland Route 810
- Location: Accokeek

Maryland Route 810 is a collection of 11 unsigned highways that are sections of old alignments of and service roads related to the present and old alignments of MD 210 (Indian Head Highway) in Accokeek in southwestern Prince George's County. The segments of MD 810 are designated in roughly alphabetical order from south to north with MD 810A near the Charles County line and MD 810K at the intersection of MD 210 and MD 373.

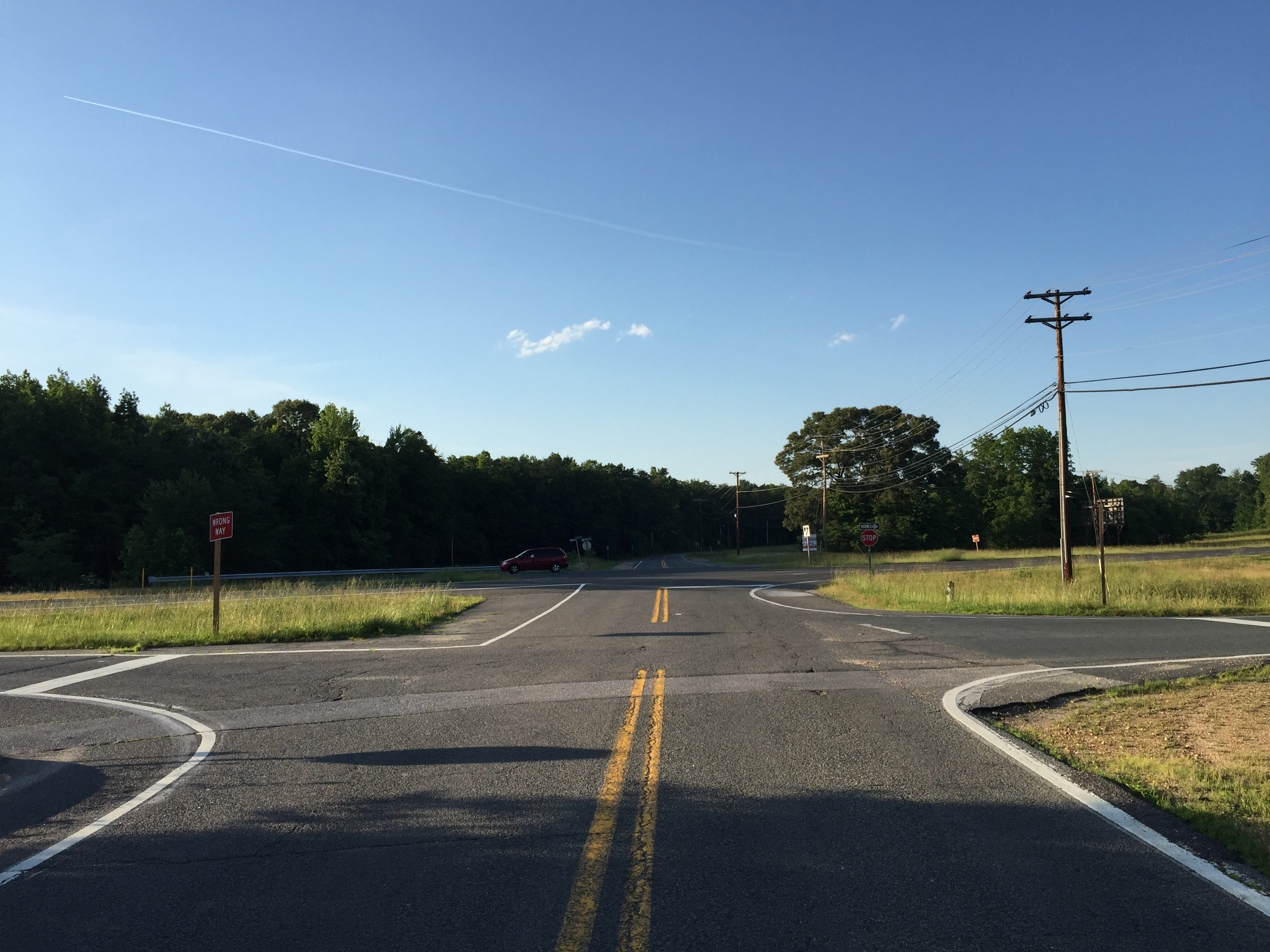
View north along MD 810A at MD 210 in Accokeek

- MD 810A is the designation for a 0.16-mile (0.26 km) stretch of Livingston Road a short distance east of the Charles County line. The state highway intersects Independence Road on a tangent, meets Beech Lane (MD 210K) at a perpendicular intersection, crosses MD 210, and intersects MD 210J immediately before its northern terminus.
- MD 810B is the designation for a 0.04-mile (0.064 km) section of Spring Grove Drive heading east from Beech Lane on the northbound side of MD 210.
- MD 810C is the designation for a 0.04-mile (0.064 km) section of Dale Lane heading east from Beech Lane on the northbound side of MD 210.
- MD 810D is the designation for a 0.04-mile (0.064 km) section of Maple Lane heading east from Beech Lane on the northbound side of MD 210.
- MD 810E is the designation for a 0.08-mile (0.13 km) stretch of Pine Drive. The state highway begins at Beech Lane, crosses MD 210, and intersects Beretta Drive (MD 210L) immediately before its northern terminus.
- MD 810F is the designation for a 0.10-mile (0.16 km) segment of Holly Way between Holly Road (MD 210M) and Pine Lane (MD 810G) on the southbound side of MD 210.
- MD 810G is the designation for a 0.06-mile (0.097 km) section of Pine Lane between MD 210 and Holly Way (MD 810F) on the southbound side of MD 210.
- MD 810H is the designation for a 0.11-mile (0.18 km) stretch of Manning Road that begins at the southbound direction of MD 210 and intersects MD 210N before reaching the northern terminus.
- MD 810I is the designation for a 0.69-mile (1.11 km) segment of Manning Road that begins at the northbound direction of MD 210 and heads east to its eastern terminus just beyond MD 228 (Berry Road), where Manning Road continues as a county highway. The two segments of Manning Road terminate at the same point on MD 210 but there is no access across MD 210's median.
- MD 810J is the designation for a 0.10-mile (0.16 km) section of Livingston Road that runs from Biddle Road (MD 210S) east to the intersection of MD 210 and MD 373 (Livingston Road).
- MD 810K is the designation for a 0.10-mile (0.16 km) stretch of Bryan Point Road that runs from a dead end adjacent to the MD 210–MD 373 intersection to Biddle Road (MD 210S).

Browse numbered routes
← MD 808	→ MD 813

== MD 813 ==
Maryland Route 813F
- Location: Sharptown
- Length: 0.12 mi (190 m)

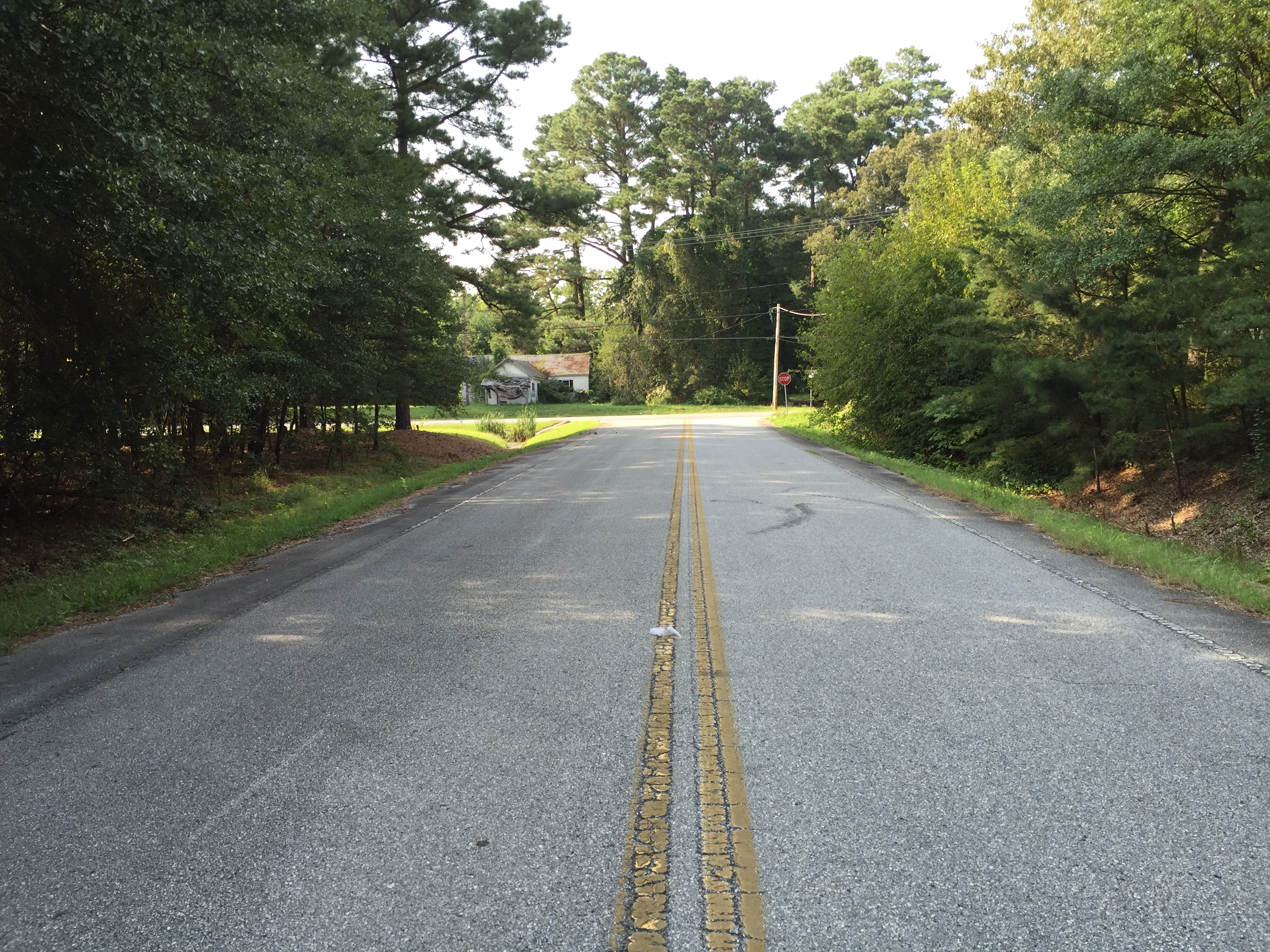
MD 813 at MD 313 near Sharptown

Maryland Route 813F is the unsigned designation for Twiford Road which runs from a short distance south of MD 313 north to State Street near Sharptown, Wicomico County, crossing MD 313. The route is 0.12 miles (0.19 km) long.

Browse numbered routes
← MD 810	→ MD 815

== MD 815 ==
Maryland Route 815
- Location: Salisbury
- Length: 0.72 mi (1,160 m)

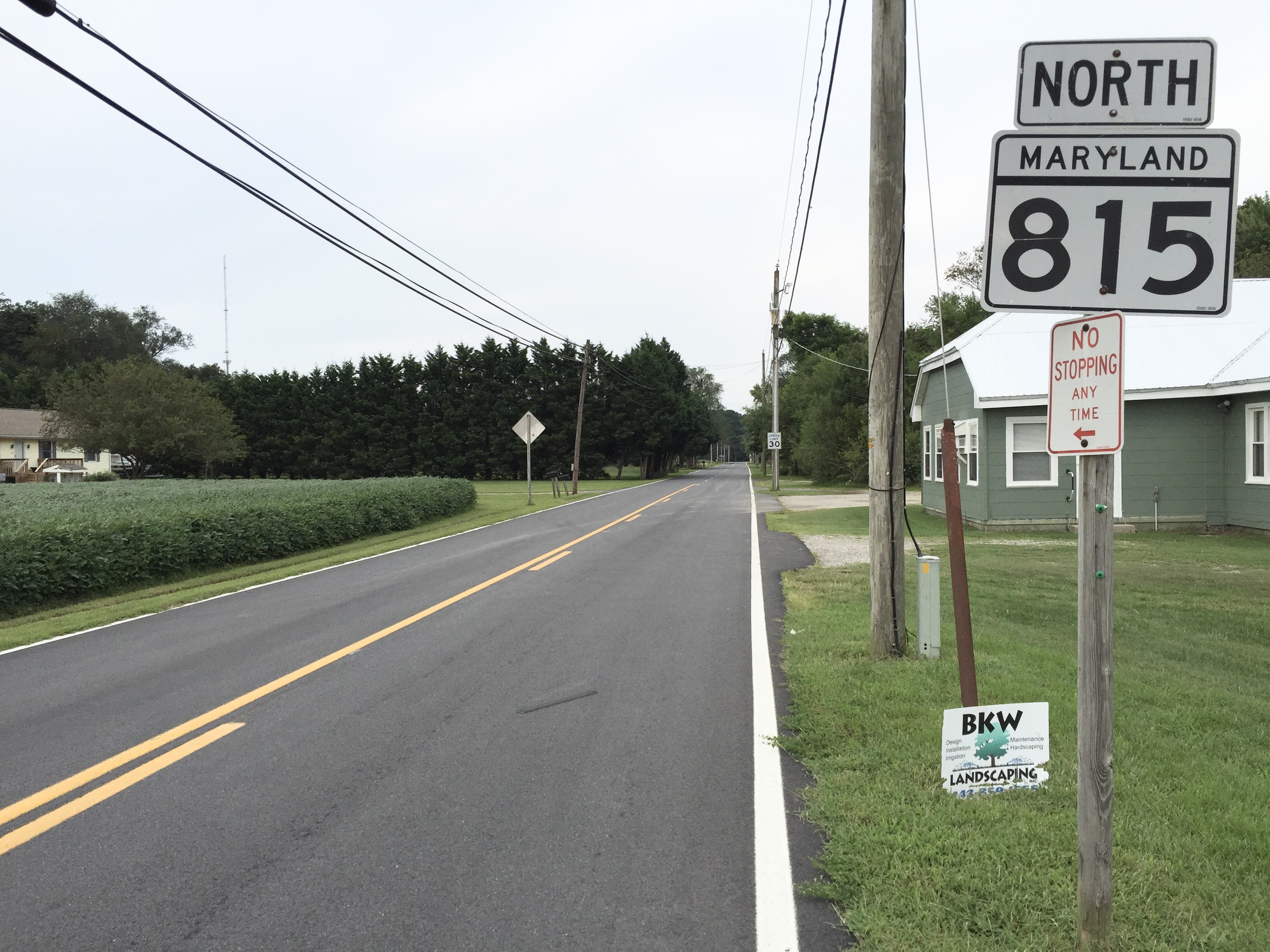
MD 815 northbound at MD 349 near Salisbury

Maryland Route 815 is the designation for Old Quantico Road, the old alignment of MD 349 (Nanticoke Road) just west of Salisbury. The state highway runs 0.72 mi (1.16 km) between two intersections with MD 349.

Browse numbered routes
← MD 813	→ MD 817

== MD 817 ==
Maryland Route 817
- Location: Preston–Linchester

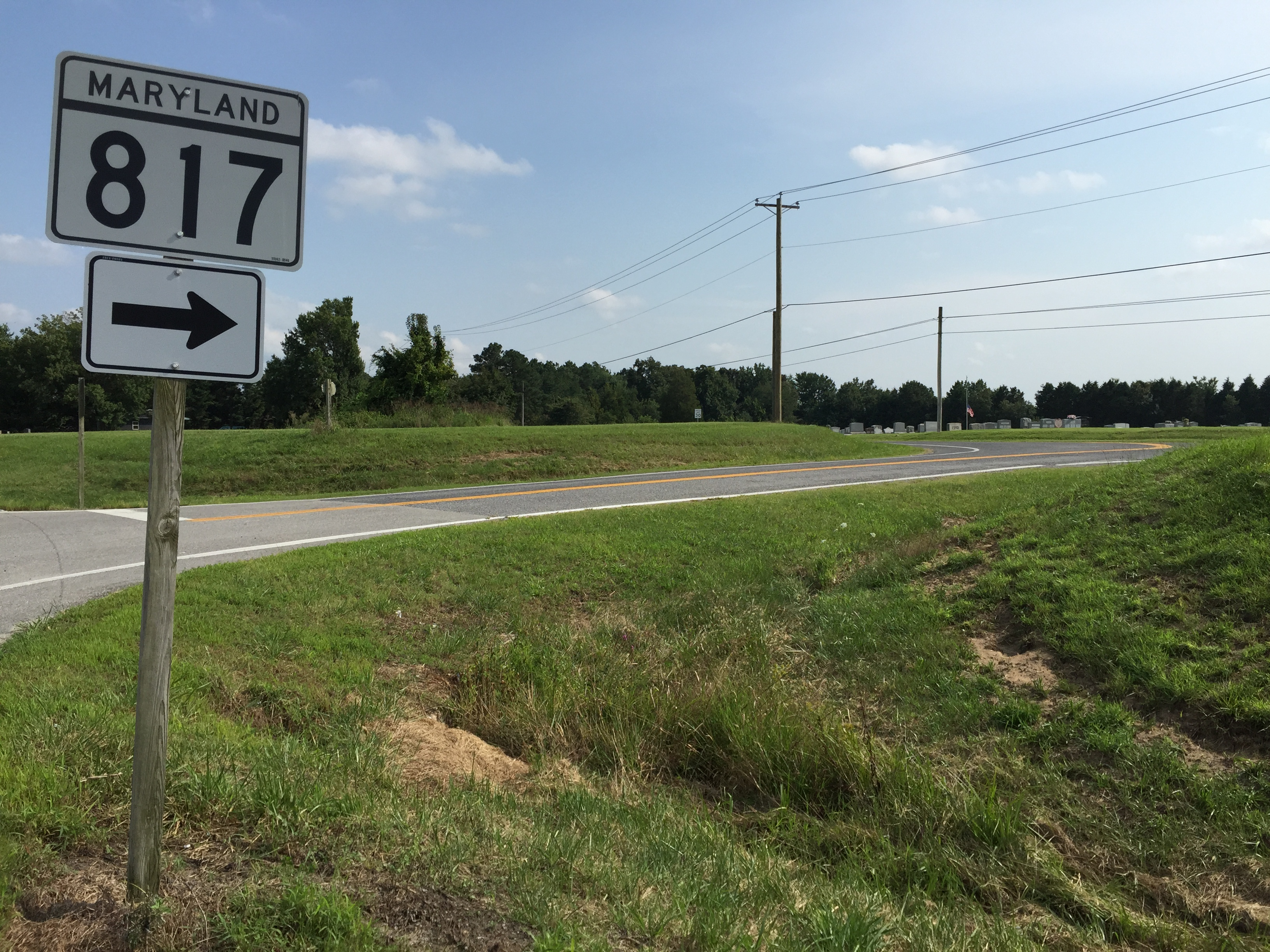
View south along MD 817A at MD 16/MD 331 in Preston

Maryland Route 817 is the designation for two sections of old alignment of MD 331 and MD 16 in the southwestern corner of Caroline County.

- MD 817A is the designation for Linchester Road, which runs 0.46 mi (0.74 km) from MD 331 / MD 16 (Preston Road) at Linchester north to MD 331 / MD 16 (Main Street) in the town of Preston. MD 817A passes by the Linchester Mill.
- MD 817B is the unsigned designation for Langrell Road, which runs 0.52 mi (0.84 km) from MD 318 (Preston Road) at the Dorchester County line north to a dead end adjacent to the southern terminus of MD 817A.

Browse numbered routes
← MD 815	→ MD 818

== MD 819 ==
Maryland Route 819
- Location: Reids Grove
- Length: 0.19 mi (310 m)

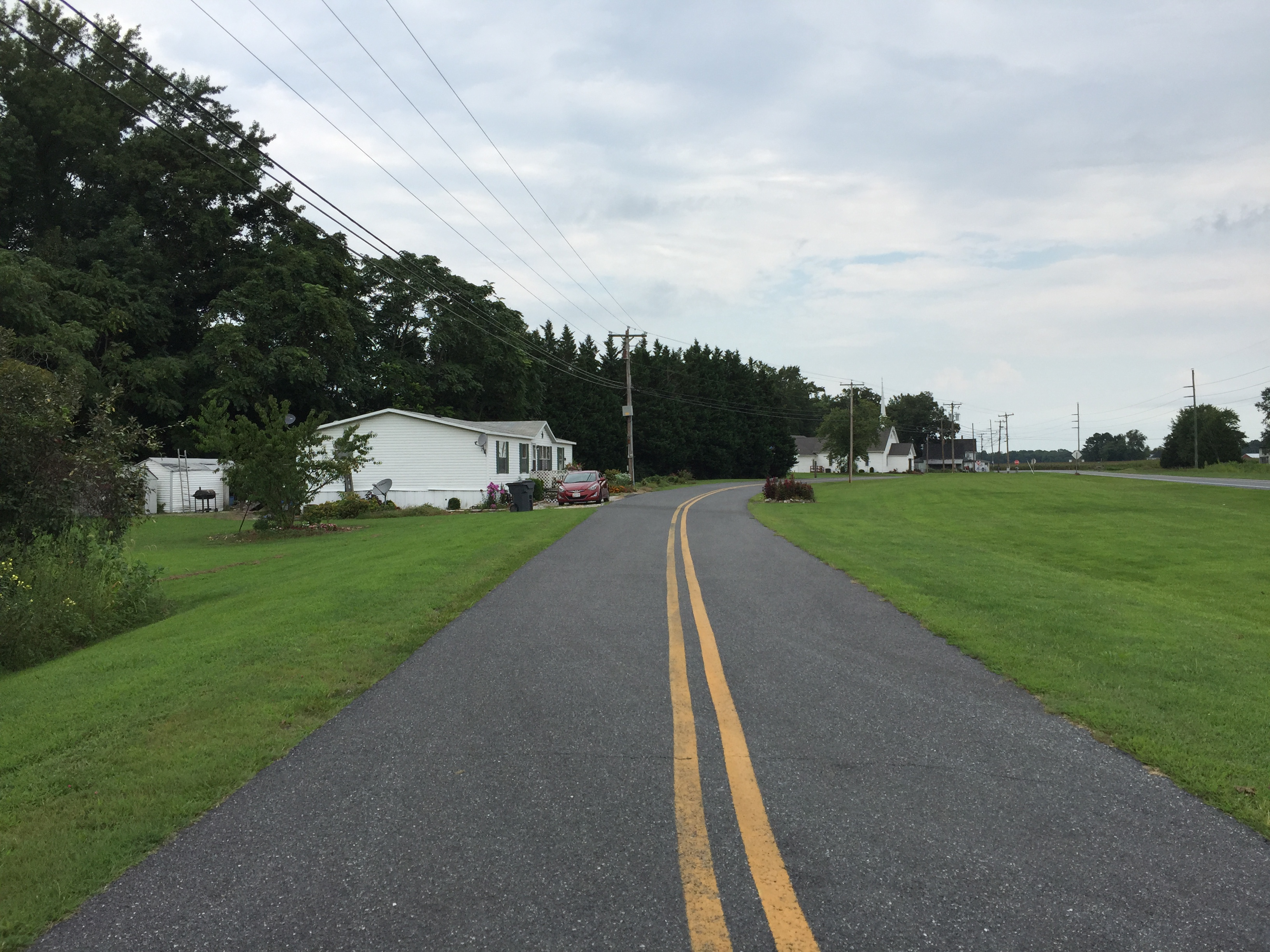
MD 819 at MD 331 in Reids Grove

Maryland Route 819 is the designation for Reids Grove Road, a loop off Maryland Route 331 in Reids Grove, Dorchester County. The route is 0.19 miles (0.31 km) long.

Browse numbered routes
← MD 818	→ MD 820

== MD 820 ==
Maryland Route 820
- Location: Caroline County
- Length: 0.13 mi (210 m)

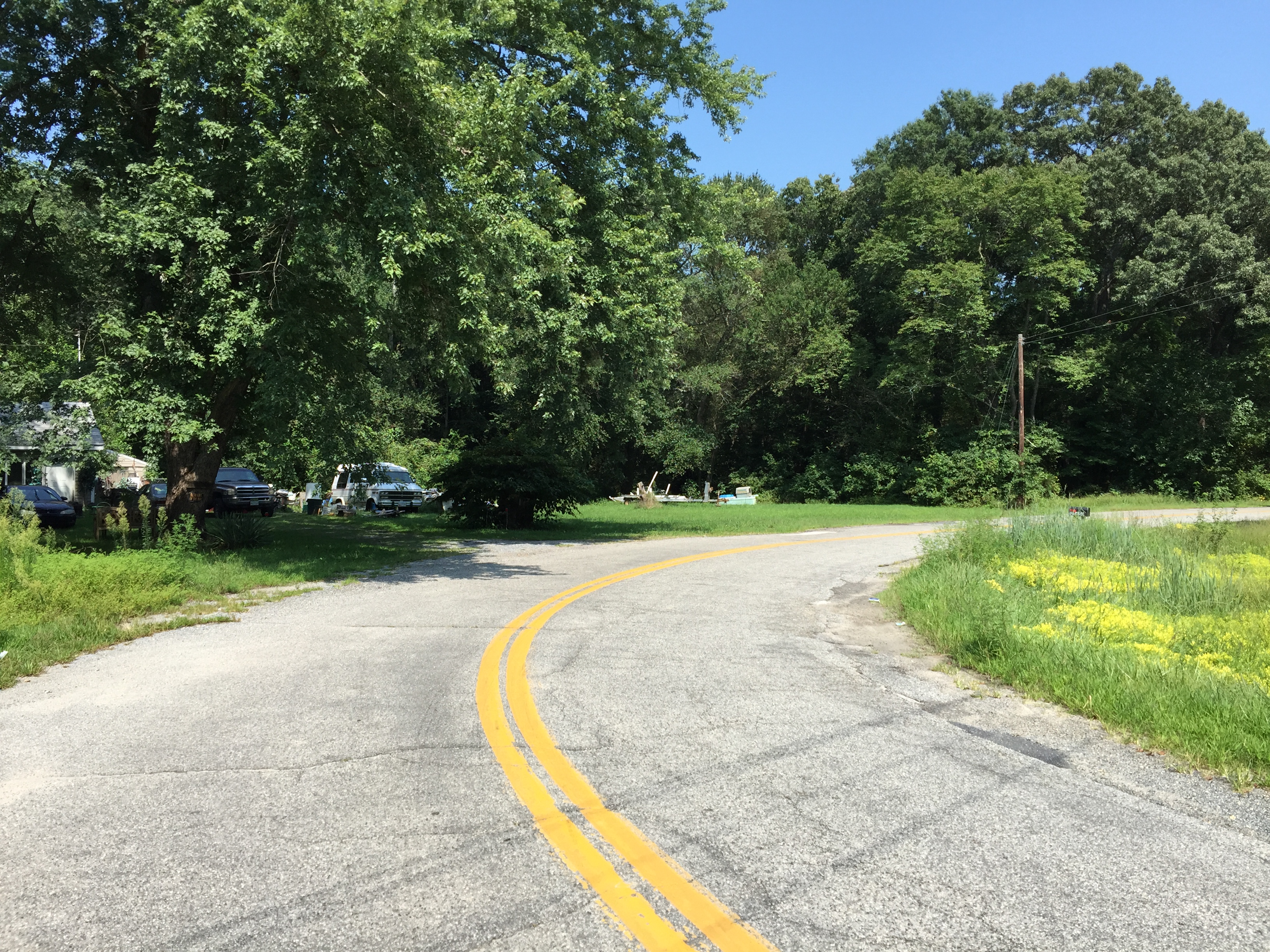
MD 820 at MD 313 in Caroline County

Maryland Route 820 is the unsigned designation for the westernmost end of Castle Hall Road. The state-maintained portion runs from Maryland Route 313 to a dead end in Caroline County. Near the middle, the county-maintained portion of Castle Hall Road intersects the route. The state-maintained portion is 0.13 miles (0.21 km) long.

Browse numbered routes
← MD 819	→ MD 821

== MD 821 ==
Maryland Route 821
- Location: Marydel
- Length: 0.40 mi (640 m)

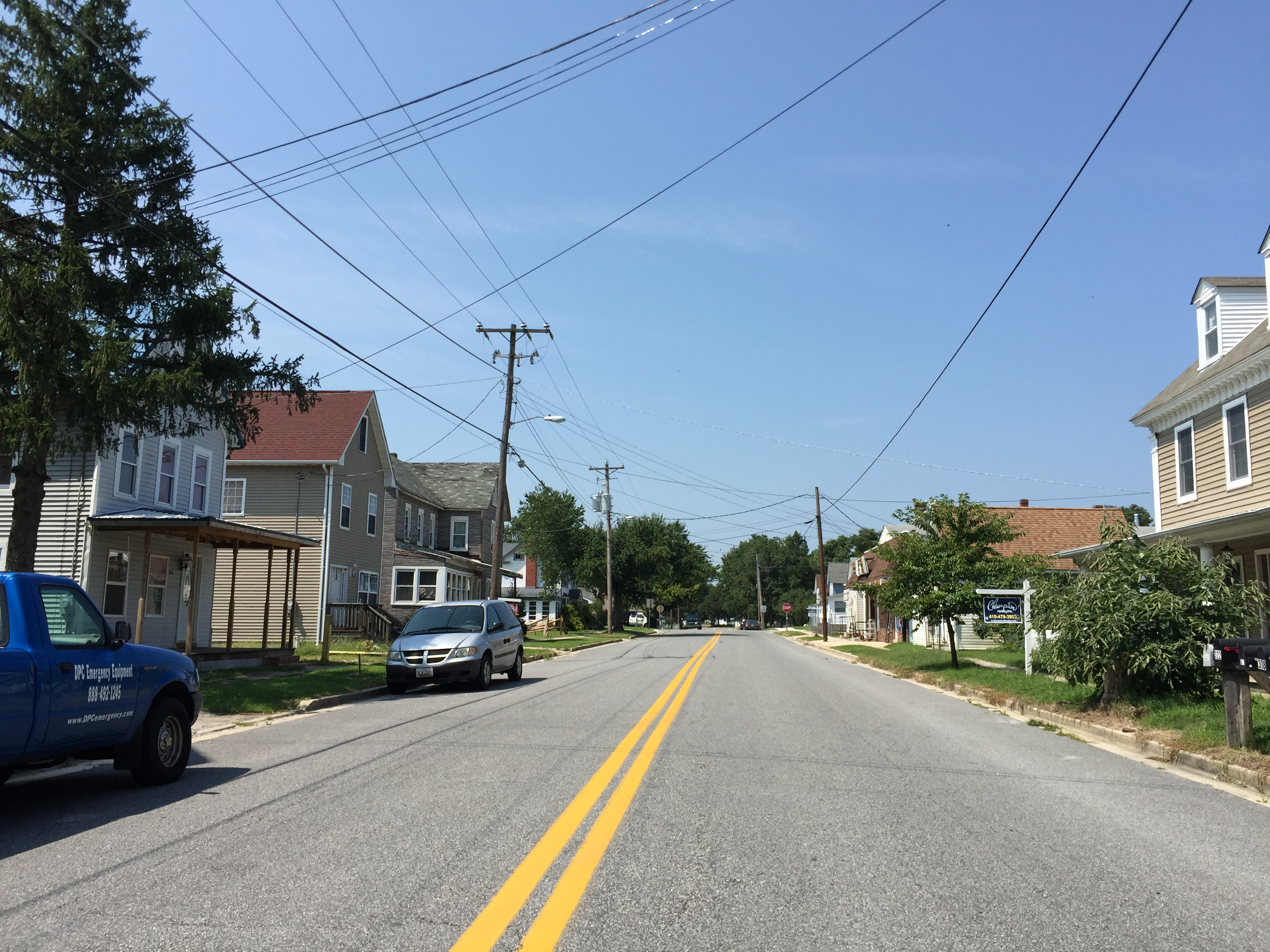
MD 821 along Main Street in Marydel

Maryland Route 821 is the unsigned designation for Main Street, a 0.40-mile (0.64 km) highway that passes through the town of Marydel, intersecting MD 311 (Halltown Road) and connecting with MD 454 (Crown Stone Road/Halltown Road) at both ends.

Browse numbered routes
← MD 820	→ MD 822

== MD 822 ==
Maryland Route 822
- Location: Princess Anne
- Length: 0.85 mi (1,370 m)
- Existed: 2001–

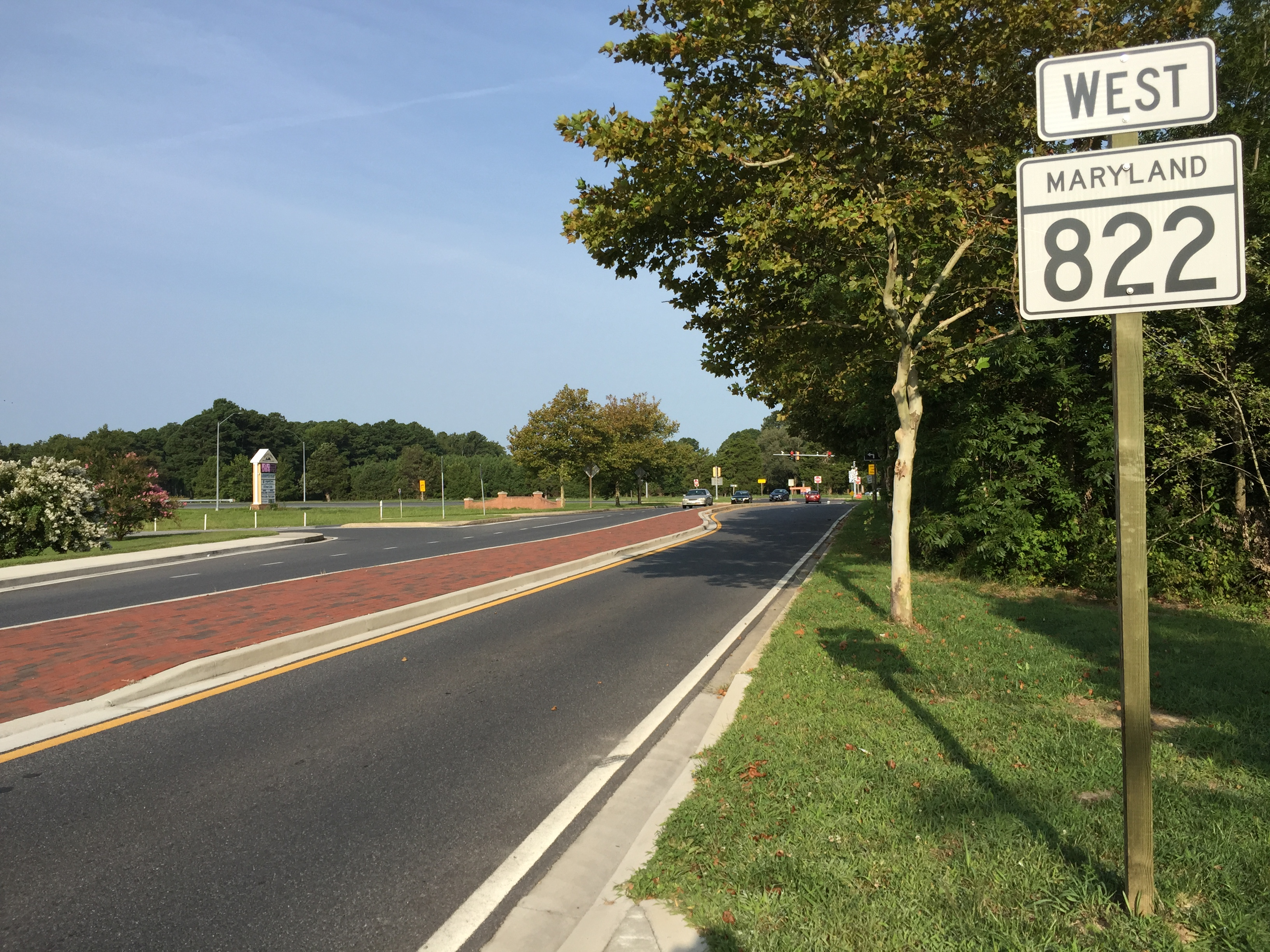
View west along MD 822 at MD 675 in Princess Anne

Maryland Route 822 is the designation for UMES Boulevard, a 0.85 mi (1.37 km) connector between US 13 and College Backbone Road on the campus of the University of Maryland Eastern Shore. MD 822 heads east from US 13 as a two-lane divided highway, reaching a roundabout with MD 675. Past this point, the route passes student apartment complexes and curves southeast, becoming undivided and crossing the Delmarva Central Railroad's Delmarva Subdivision railroad line at-grade. The road runs through a wooded area and crosses Loretta Branch prior to becoming a divided highway again and heading onto the university campus. Here, MD 822 passes to the west of athletic fields before coming to its terminus at College Backbone Road. MD 822 was constructed as a new access road to the University of Maryland Eastern Shore campus and opened to traffic in 2001. In 2010, plans were made to construct a roundabout at the intersection of MD 675 and MD 822 in Princess Anne. The roundabout was completed in 2015.

Browse numbered routes
← MD 821	→ MD 824

== MD 825 ==
Maryland Route 825
- Location: Mountain Lake Park, Backbone Mountain

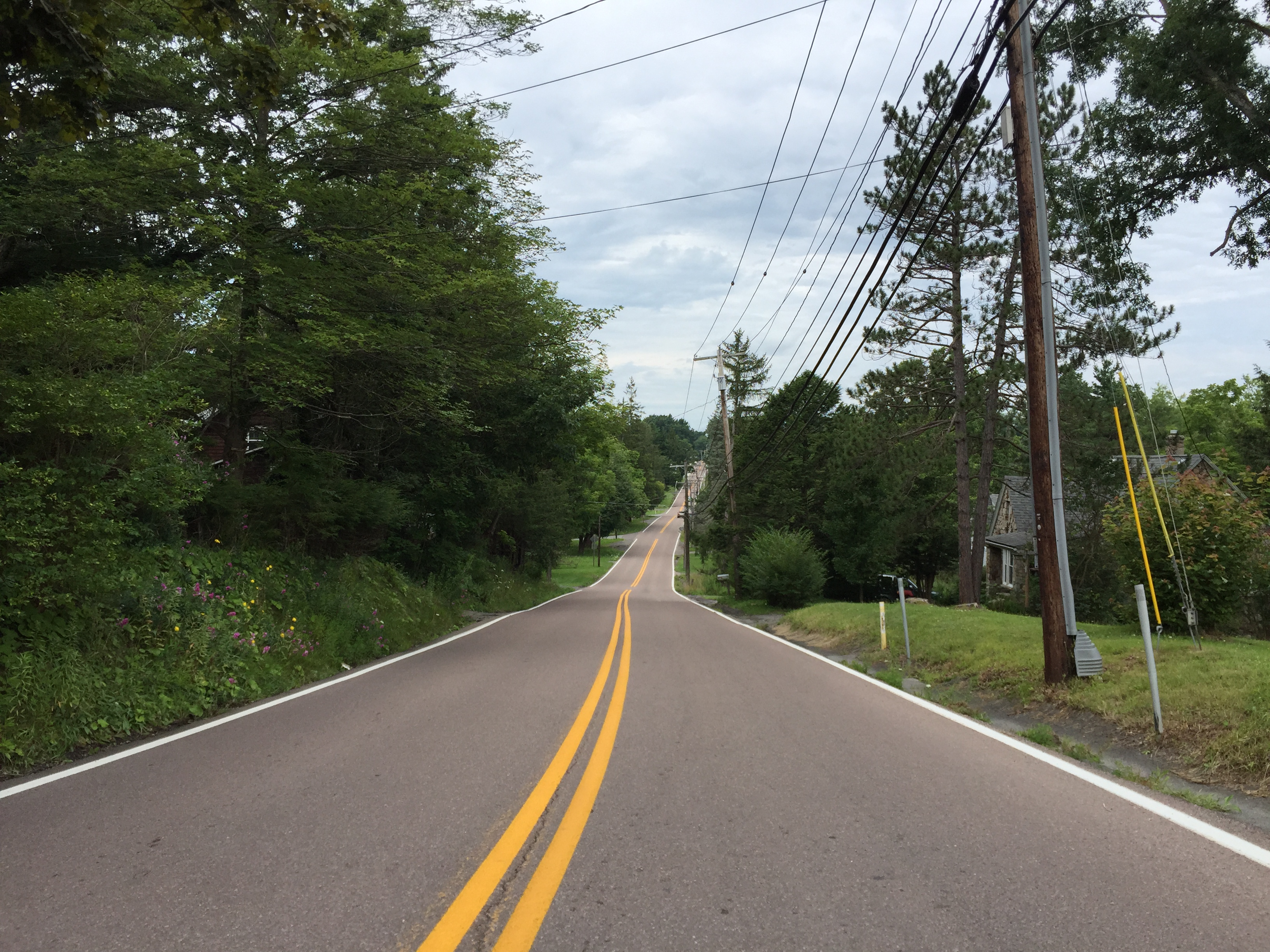
View west along MD 825B in Mountain Lake Park

Maryland Route 825 is the designation for a pair of unsigned highways in Garrett County.

- MD 825B is the designation for Oakland Drive and G Street, the 0.94-mile (1.51 km) old alignment of MD 135 through Mountain Lake Park.
- MD 825C is the designation for an unnamed 0.19-mile (0.31 km) road that parallels MD 135 between two dead ends on the other side of a salt dome a short distance east of MD 135's intersection with MD 38 on top of Backbone Mountain. The highway is connected to MD 135 by MD 135C.

Browse numbered routes
← MD 824	→ MD 826

== MD 826 ==
Maryland Route 826
- Location: Garrett County

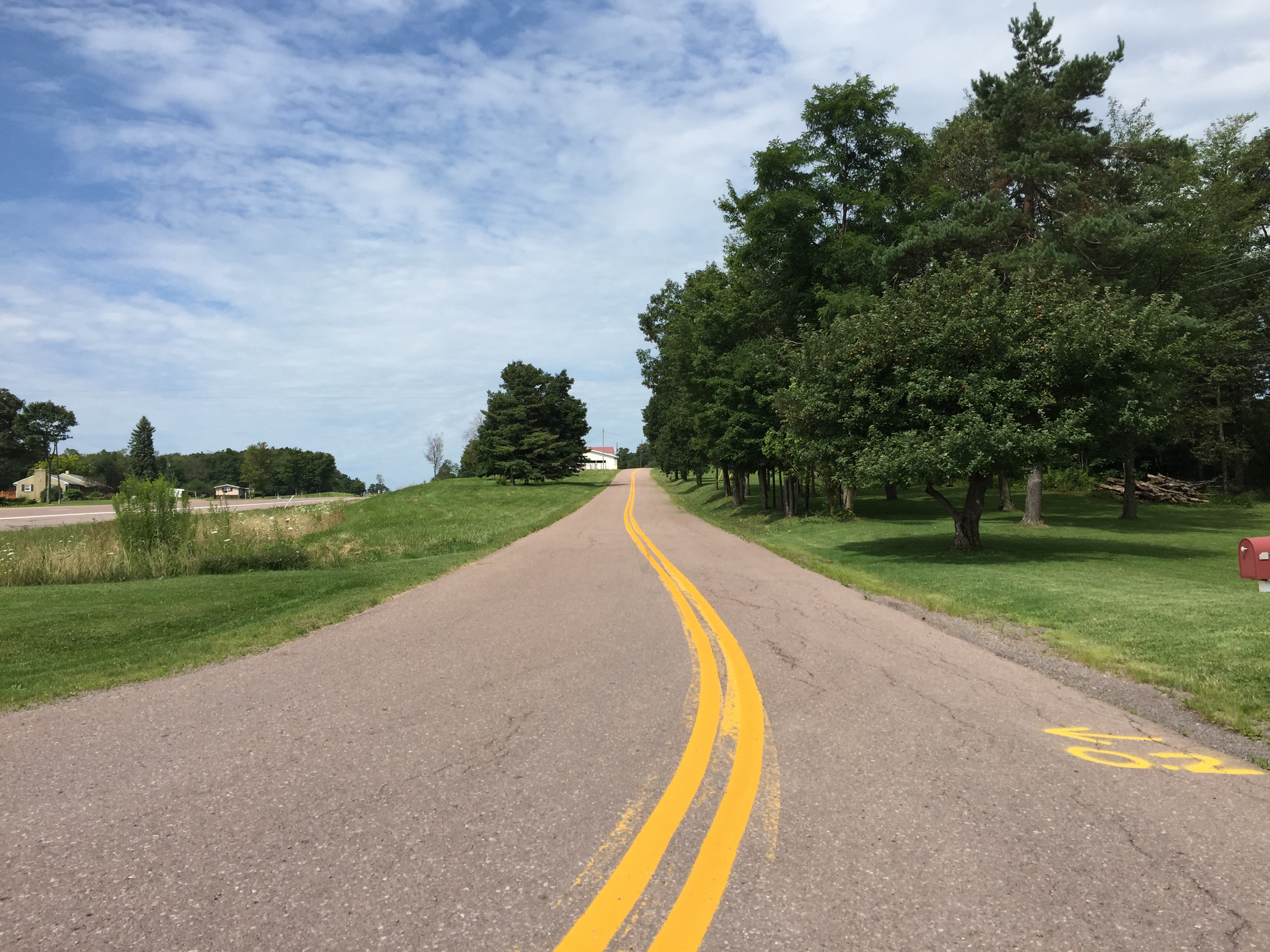
MD 826J at US 219 in Keysers Ridge

Maryland Route 826 is a collection of 14 unsigned highways that are or were service roads constructed or old alignments maintained to provide access to private property or county highways whose access was compromised by the reconstruction of US 219 in Garrett County in the 1950s. Several instances of MD 826 connect with auxiliary routes of US 219. MD 826A through MD 826D and MD 826R are found near Oakland. MD 826E, MD 826G, MD 826H, and MD 826J through MD 826N are located between Accident and Keyser's Ridge. MD 826P was established between Hoyes and Accident.

- MD 826A is the designation for SHA Drive and Weber Road, which together comprise 0.56 mi (0.90 km) of the old alignment of US 219 between CSX's Mountain Subdivision and an old alignment of MD 135, MD 825B (Oakland Drive). The state highway intersects both MD 135 (Maryland Highway) and US 219A (Weber Road), which connects MD 826A with US 219. MD 826A provides access to the Oakland Shop of the Maryland State Highway Administration at its southern end.
- MD 826B is the designation for Lumber City Road, a 0.15-mile (0.24 km) service road that provides access to industrial facilities west of US 219 just north of the CSX rail line in Oakland. MD 826B connects to US 219 at the same intersection as US 219A (Weber Road).
- MD 826C is the designation for an unnamed service road that comprises 0.16 mi (0.26 km) of the old alignment of US 219 between Gortner and Oakland, paralleling the southbound side of US 219 between two dead ends north of Monte Vista Road.
- MD 826D is the designation for an unnamed service road that comprises 0.05 mi (0.080 km) of the old alignment of US 219 between Gortner and Oakland, paralleling the southbound side of US 219 between two dead ends south of Monte Vista Road.
- MD 826E is the designation for Accident Garage Road, which comprises 0.35 mi (0.56 km) of the old alignment of US 219 between Accident and Keyser's Ridge, paralleling the northbound side of the federal highway heading west from US 219. MD 826E is located just south of Northern Garrett High School and serves the namesake business.
- MD 826G is the designation for an unnamed service road that comprises 0.08 mi (0.13 km) of the old alignment of US 219 between Accident and Bear Creek, paralleling the southbound side of US 219 between two dead ends. MD 826G is connected to US 219 by US 219C.
- MD 826H is the designation for an unnamed 0.19-mile (0.31 km) service road that runs from US 40 (National Pike) southeast to a dead end at Exit 14 of Interstate 68 in Keyser's Ridge. MD 826H provides access to the Keyser's Ridge Shop of the Maryland State Highway Administration.
- MD 826J is the designation for Stockyard Road, which comprises 0.60 mi (0.97 km) of the old alignment of US 219 at Keyser's Ridge paralleling the southbound side of the federal highway. The state highway runs between two dead ends; access to US 219 is provided at the south end and north end by US 219D and US 219E, respectively.
- MD 826K is the designation for an unnamed service road that comprises 0.05 mi (0.080 km) of the old alignment of US 219 south of Keyser's Ridge, paralleling the northbound side of the federal highway between two dead ends. MD 826K is connected to US 219 by US 219F.
- MD 826L is the designation for Ryland Court, which comprises 0.19 mi (0.31 km) of the old alignment of US 219 south of Keyser's Ridge, paralleling the southbound side of the federal highway between two dead ends. MD 826L is connected to US 219 by US 219G.
- MD 826M was the designation for Rabbit Hollow Road, which comprised 0.51 mi (0.82 km) of the old alignment of US 219 south of Keyser's Ridge, paralleling the northbound side of the federal highway heading east from US 219 to the county-maintained portion of Rabbit Hollow Road. MD 826M was removed from the state highway system in 2015 and transferred to county maintenance.
- MD 826N is the designation for an unnamed service road that comprises 0.25 mi (0.40 km) of the old alignment of US 219 south of Keyser's Ridge, paralleling the northbound side of the federal highway between two dead ends. MD 826N is connected to US 219 by county-maintained Collier Road just north of Northern Garrett High School.
- MD 826P is the designation for an unnamed service road that comprises 0.17 mi (0.27 km) of the old alignment of US 219 south of Accident, looping between two intersections with the federal highway on the northbound side.
- MD 826R is the designation for an unnamed road that runs 0.085 mi (0.137 km) from US 219 north to a gate at a SHA facility south of Oakland. The route was designated in 2014.

Browse numbered routes
← MD 825	→ MD 827

== MD 827 ==
Maryland Route 827
- Location: Hutton, Crellin

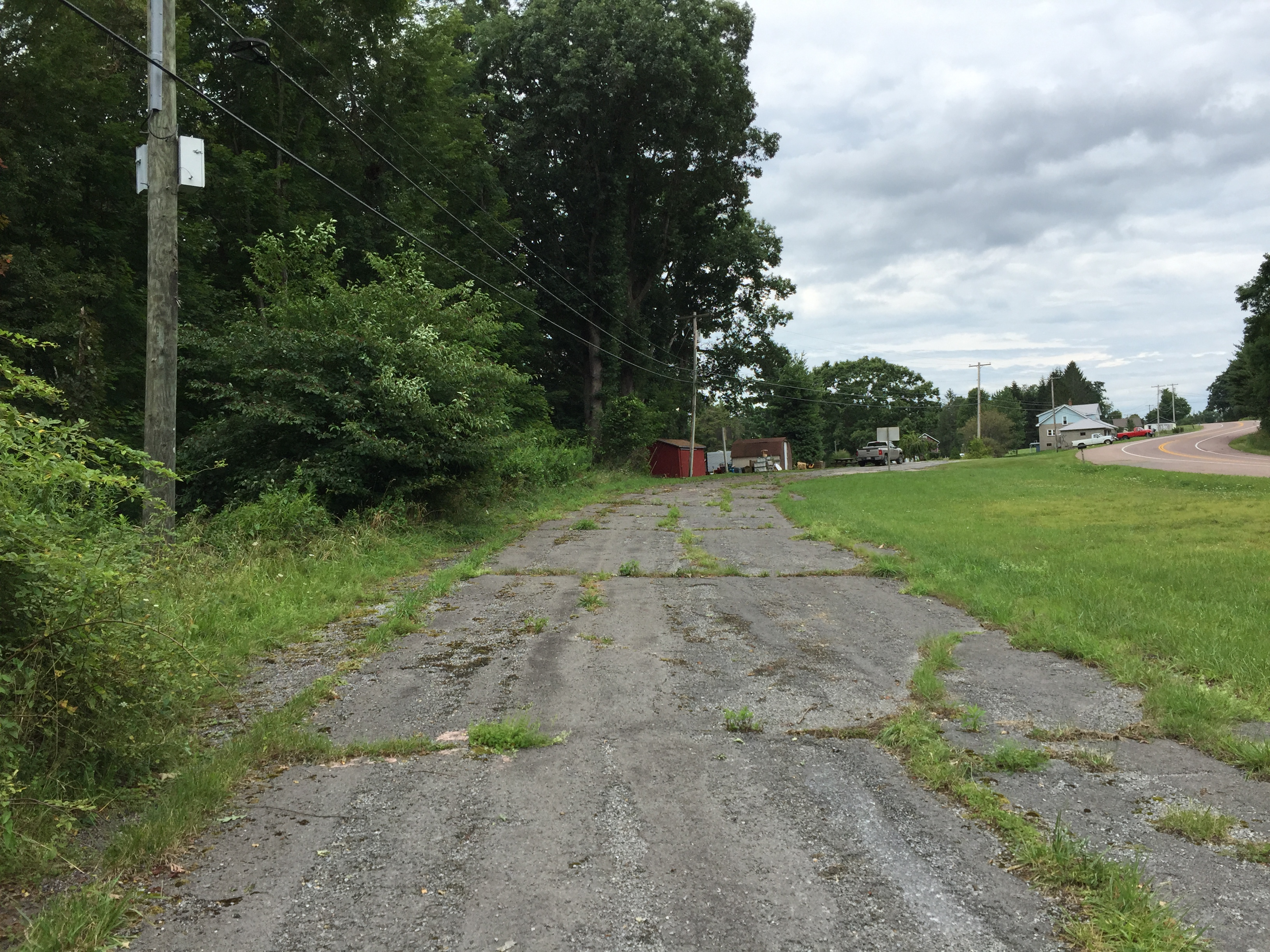
MD 827C at MD 39 in Crellin

Maryland Route 827 is the unsigned designation for two short sections of old alignment of MD 39 in western Garrett County.

- MD 827A has a length of 0.01 miles (0.016 km) and is located just east of Tannery Road in Hutton.
- MD 827C has a length of 0.05 miles (0.080 km) and is located just west of Stemple Road in Crellin. The road is connected to MD 39 by MD 39A.

Browse numbered routes
← MD 826	→ MD 828

== MD 828 ==
Maryland Route 828
- Location: Friendsville

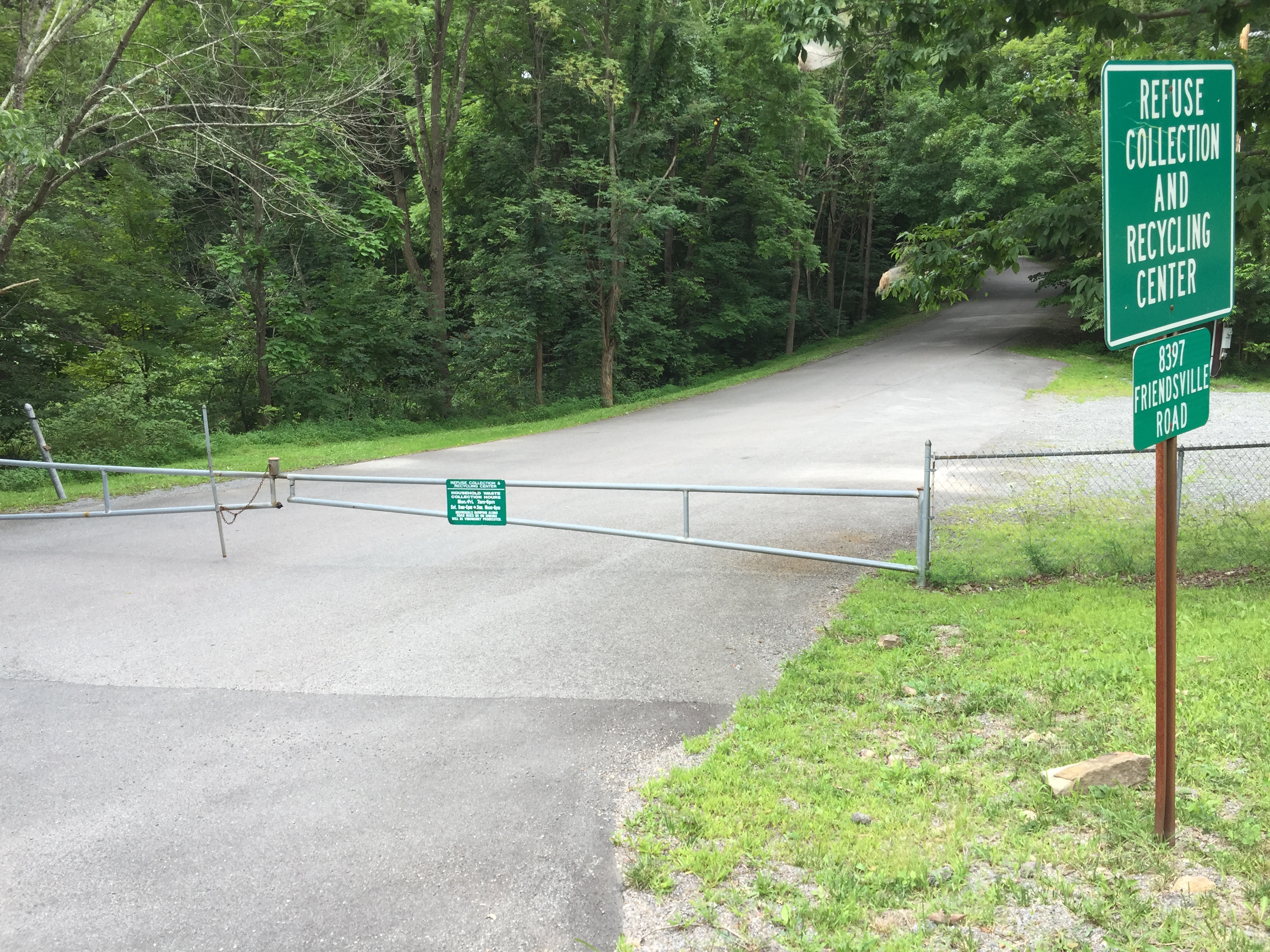
MD 828 at MD 42 in Friendsville

Maryland Route 828 is the unsigned designation for a 0.13-mile (0.21 km) spur of old alignment from MD 42 west of Friendsville. The road serves the local refuse and recycling center.

- MD 828A is the unsigned designation for 0.12-mile (0.19 km) section of old alignment between two dead ends parallel to MD 42 near Blooming Rose Road west of Friendsville. The state highway is connected to MD 42 by MD 42A.

Browse numbered routes
← MD 827	→ MD 830

== MD 830 ==
Maryland Route 830
- Location: Dawson, Rawlings

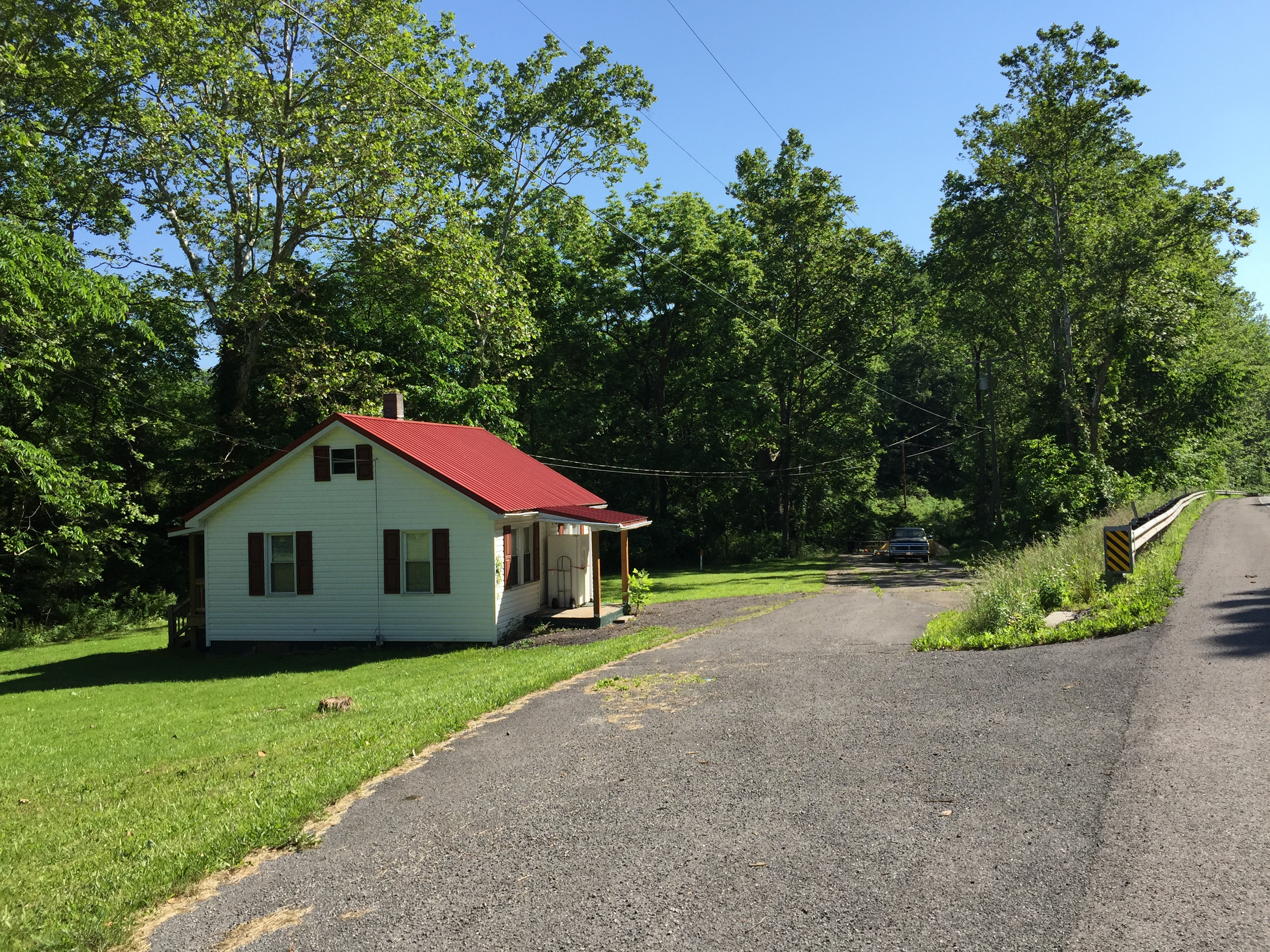
MD 830B at US 220 near Rawlings

Maryland Route 830 is the unsigned designation for two short spurs. These spurs are the remnants of curves removed when US 220 was rebuilt in the 1950s. MD 830A has a length of 0.02 mi (0.032 km) and is located in Dawson. MD 830B has a length of 0.04 mi (0.064 km) and is located in Rawlings.

Browse numbered routes
← MD 828	→ MD 831

== MD 831 ==
Maryland Route 831
- Location: Allegany County, New Windsor

Maryland Route 831 is a collection of nine unsigned state highways, eight of which are sections of the old alignment of MD 36 between Frostburg and Cumberland in northwestern Allegany County. The segments of MD 831 range from MD 831A at MD 36's northern terminus to MD 831G south of Frostburg. MD 831H and MD 831I are spurs from MD 831C and MD 831A, respectively. MD 831J is a section of the old alignment of MD 31 in New Windsor in Carroll County.

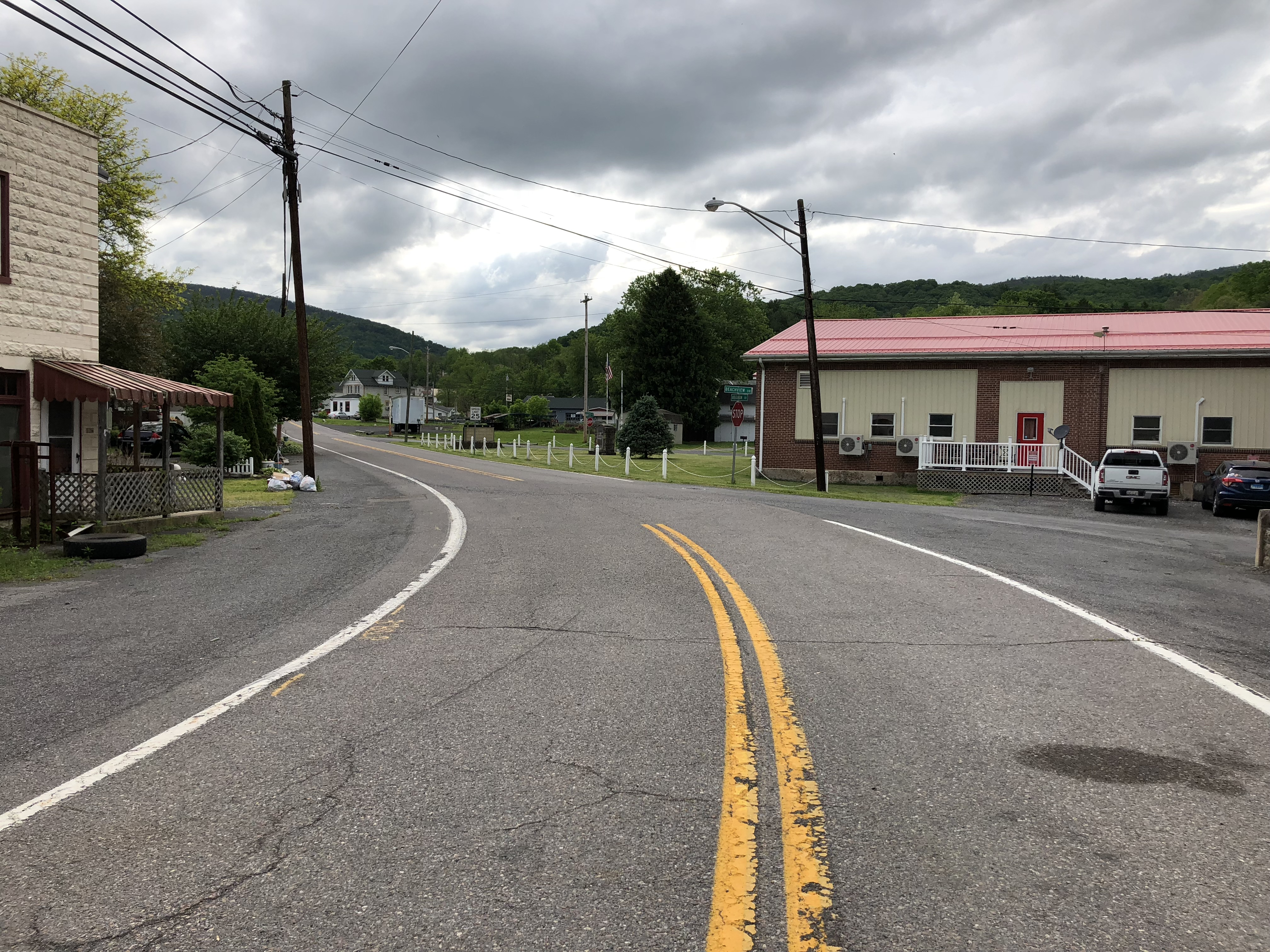
MD 831C at Beach View Drive in Corriganvile

- MD 831A is the designation for Old Mount Savage Road, an old alignment of MD 36 near MD 36's northern terminus between Corriganville and Cumberland. The state highway runs 0.48 miles (0.77 km) between US 40 Alternate and MD 36. At its northern end, it follows Dakota Road a very short distance to connect back with MD 36 while MD 831I (Dakota Avenue) continues north on the old alignment to a dead end.
- MD 831B is the designation for Old Mount Savage Road, an old alignment of MD 36 south of Corriganville. The state highway runs 0.11 miles (0.18 km) between two dead ends with an intersection with Homewood Street, which is unsigned MD 36C between MD 831B and MD 36.
- MD 831C is the designation for Kriegbaum Road, an old alignment of MD 36 through Corriganville. The state highway runs east–west 0.90 miles (1.45 km) between two intersections with MD 36. Near the highway's western end, the old alignment continues west as MD 831H to a dead end.
- MD 831D is the designation for Portertown Road, a 0.37-mile (0.60 km) section of old alignment of MD 36 between Corriganville and Barrelville.
- MD 831F is an unnamed 0.04-mile (0.064 km) spur west from MD 47 in Barrelville.
- MD 831G is the designation for Caboose Road, a 0.12-mile (0.19 km) spur from MD 936 south of Frostburg just north of I-68.
- MD 831H is an unnamed 0.07-mile (0.11 km) spur from MD 831C near its western terminus to a dead end.
- MD 831I is the designation for Dakota Avenue, a 0.04-mile (0.064 km) spur from MD 831A near its northern terminus to a dead end.
- MD 831J is the designation for a 0.08-mile (0.13 km) section of Main Street between two intersections with MD 31, which is High Street at the western intersection and Main Street and Green Valley Road at the eastern intersection, in New Windsor.

Browse numbered routes
← MD 830	→ MD 832

== MD 833 ==
Maryland Route 833
- Location: Hampstead
- Length: 0.84 mi (1,350 m)

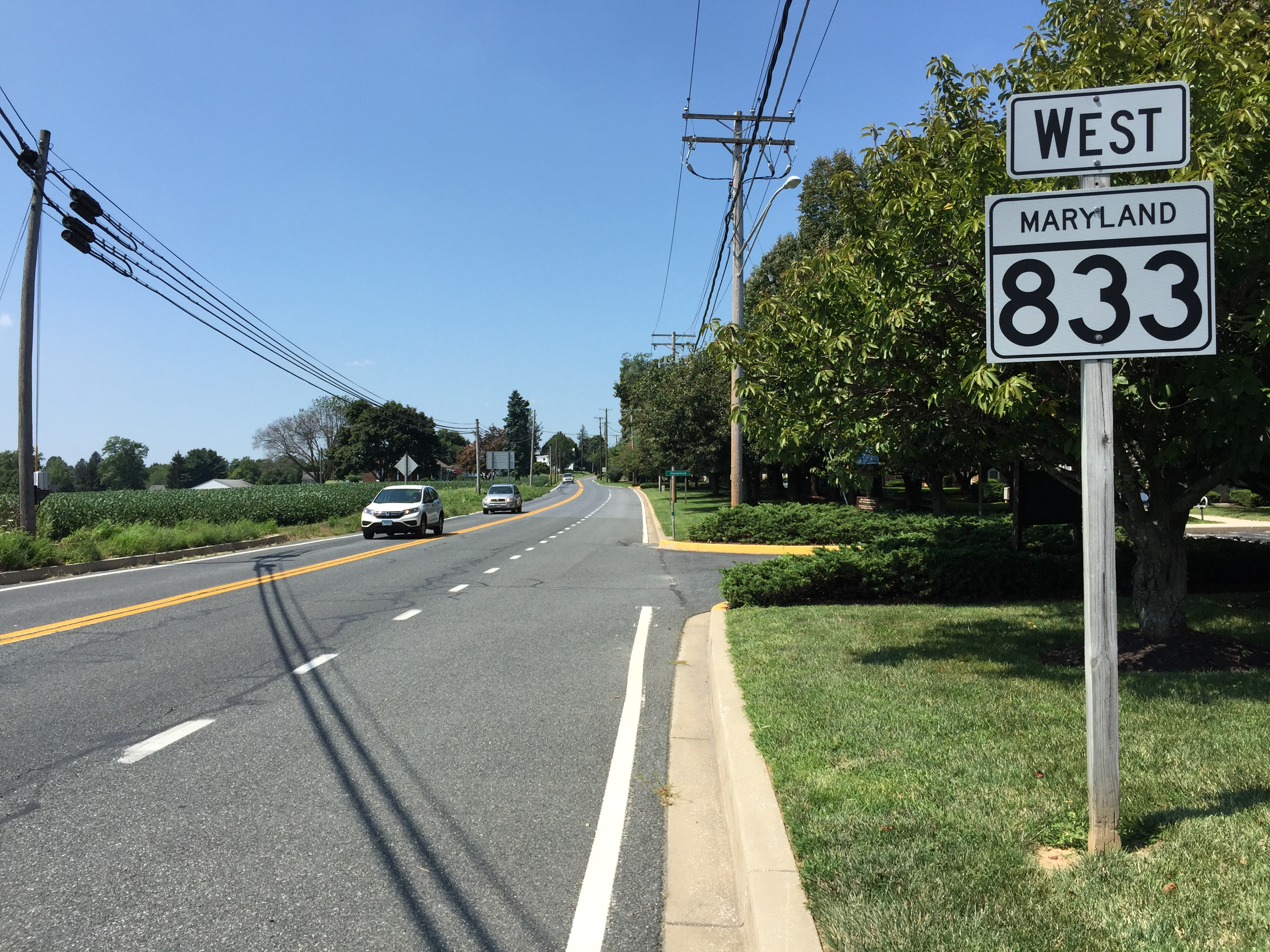
View west at the east end of MD 833 at MD 88 in Hampstead

Maryland Route 833 is the designation for Old Blackrock Road, which runs 0.84 miles (1.35 km) from MD 30 Business east to MD 88 in Hampstead. The western end of MD 833 is one-way westbound; traffic from MD 30 Business uses Gill Avenue to access eastbound MD 833. MD 833's eastern terminus is a roundabout that includes both directions of MD 88, which heads east as Black Rock Road and west as Lower Beckleysville Road, and county-maintained Lower Beckleysville Road as the northeast leg.

Browse numbered routes
← MD 832	→ MD 834

== MD 834 ==
Maryland Route 834
- Location: Price
- Length: 0.16 mi (260 m)

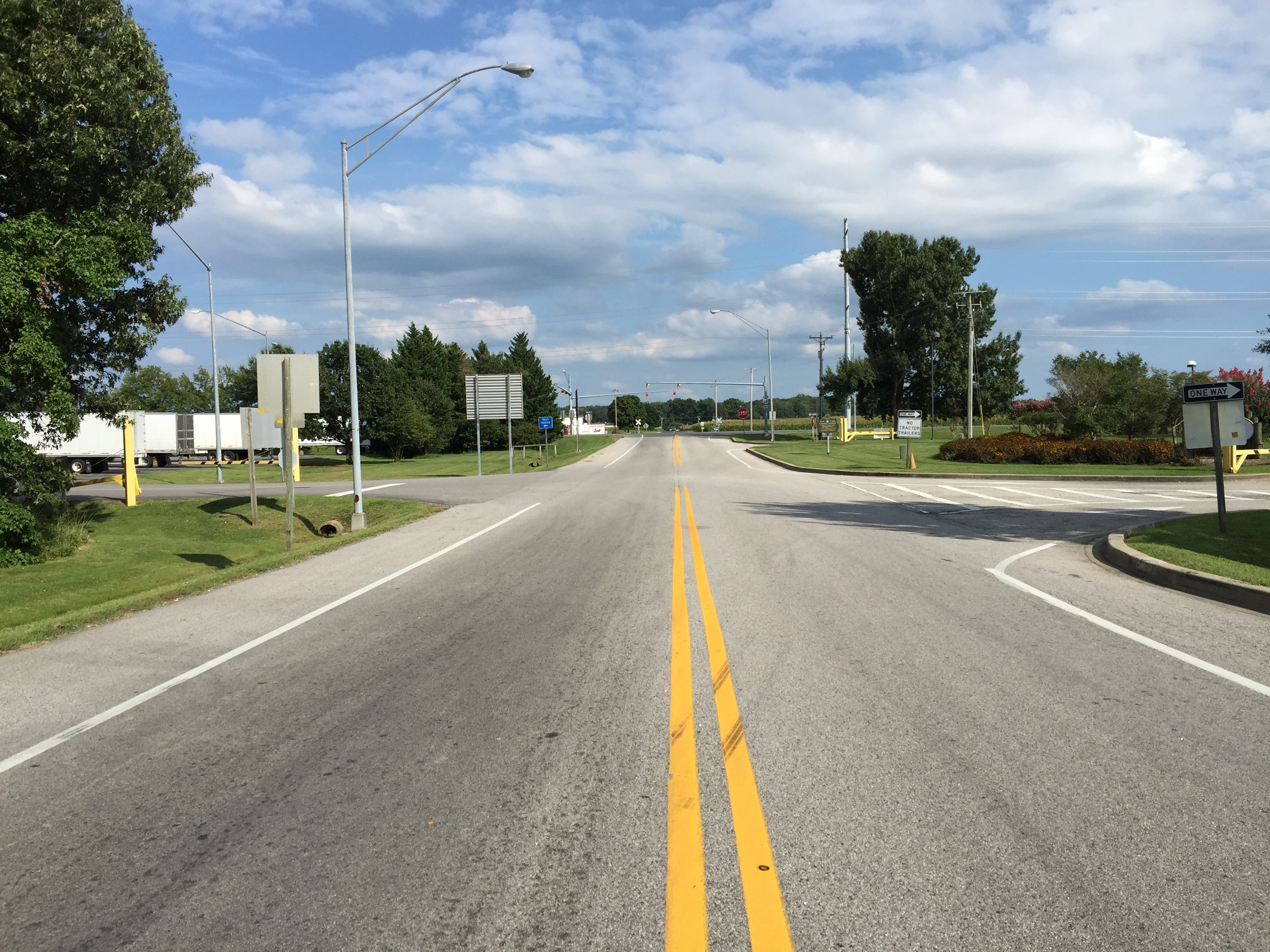
MD 834 at US 301 near Price

Maryland Route 834 is the unsigned designation for Hayden Clark Road, a 0.16 mi (0.26 km) highway near Price that runs between a T intersection with Granny Branch Road and White Marsh Road east to an at-grade crossing with the Centreville Branch of the Northern Line of the Maryland and Delaware Railroad, where the highway continues east as Hayden Road. MD 834 intersects both directions of US 301 and provides access to the Bay Country Welcome Center in the wide median of US 301.

Browse numbered routes
← MD 833	→ MD 835

== MD 835 ==
Maryland Route 835
- Location: Queen Anne's County

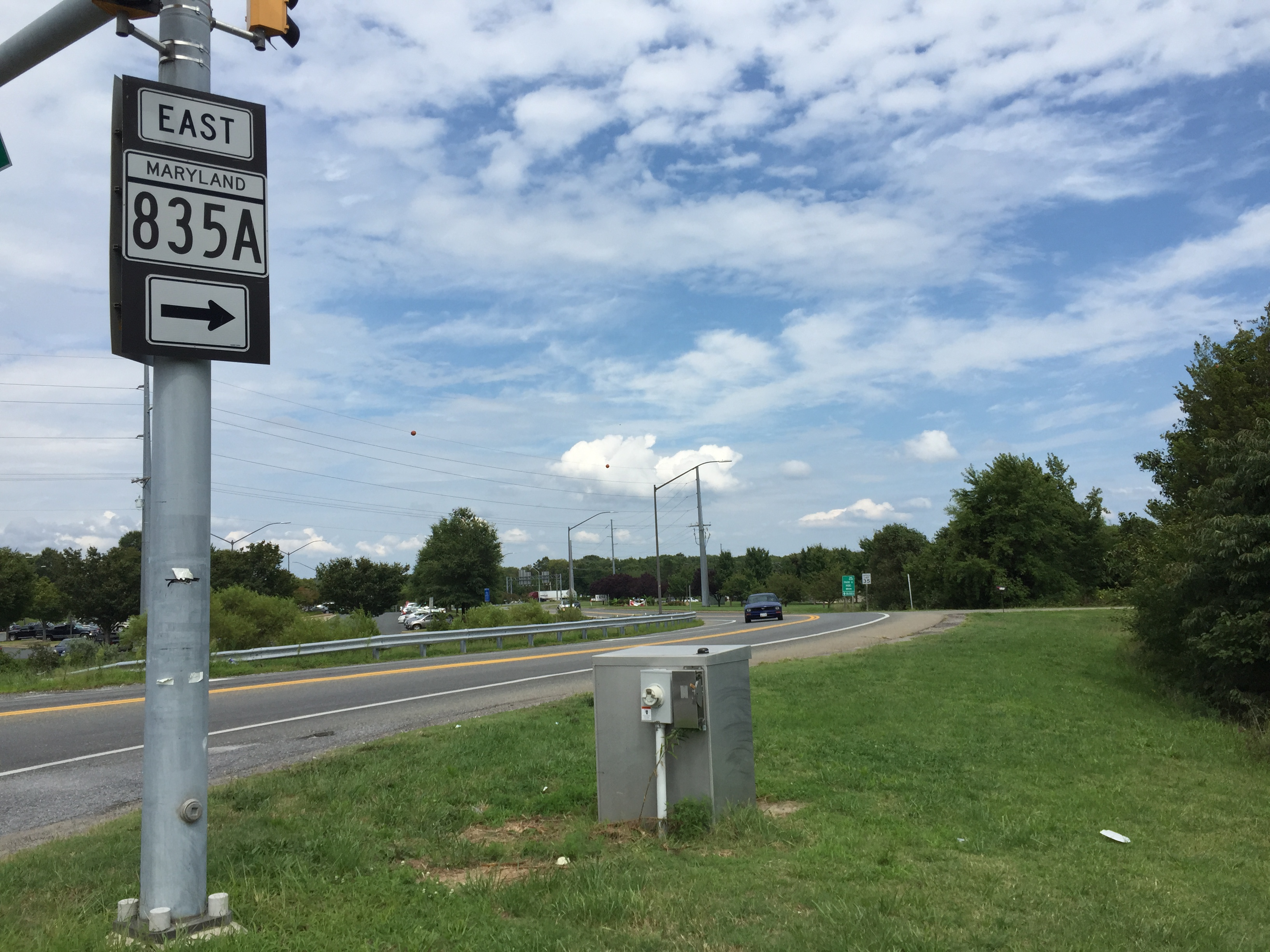
MD 835A at MD 8 in Stevensville

Maryland Route 835 is a collection of thirteen state highways that are service roads or old alignments in the vicinity of MD 18 and US 50 and US 301 in western Queen Anne's County. One of the highways, MD 835A, is signed; it is the only state highway in Maryland that is signed with its letter suffix. MD 835 and MD 835G are found in Kent Narrows. MD 835A, MD 835C, and MD 835F are located in Stevensville. MD 835B and MD 835H through MD 835K are in Grasonville. MD 835L and 835M are near Queenstown. MD 835N is near Centreville.

- MD 835 is the designation for Seward Marina Road, a 0.13-mile (0.21 km) connector between MD 18 and a right-in/right-out interchange (Exit 42) with eastbound US 50 and US 301 on the east side of Kent Narrows.
- MD 835A is the signed designation for the state-maintained portion of Pier One Road and Thompson Creek Service Road, which together run 0.77 miles (1.24 km) along the eastbound side of US 50 and US 301 in Stevensville. MD 835A is the only state highway in Maryland signed with its letter suffix. The state highway's western terminus is at the beginning of state maintenance just west of MD 8 (Romancoke Road), a short distance south of MD 8's interchange with US 50 and US 301, east of the Bay Bridge Marina, and north of Bay Bridge Airport. After the intersection with MD 8, MD 835A curves to the northeast and closely parallels the freeway, providing access to a park and ride facility serving MTA Maryland commuter buses and a pair of shopping centers. The state highway reaches its eastern terminus at a roundabout with Thompson Creek Road and the right-in/right-out ramps of Exit 38A of US 50 and US 301.
- MD 835B is the designation for Saddler Road, a 0.62-mile (1.00 km) highway that parallels the westbound side of US 50 and US 301 between Jackson Creek Road and Chester River Beach Road (unsigned MD 18V) in Grasonville.
- MD 835C is the designation for the old alignment of MD 18 through the Stevensville Historic District. The 0.77-mile (1.24 km) highway follows Old Love Point Road and East Main Street between intersections with MD 18 in Stevensville and passes by Christ Church. In 2014, a portion of MD 835C along east Main Street to the west of MD 18 became one-way westbound.
- MD 835F is the designation for a 0.05-mile (0.080 km) section of Schooner Parkway west from MD 18 in Stevensville. The state highway provides access to an office park.
- MD 835G is the designation for Kent Narrows Road, a 0.40-mile (0.64 km) connector between Kent Narrows Way North immediately east of Kent Narrows and a right-in/right-out interchange (Exit 42) with westbound US 50 and US 301.
- MD 835H is the designation for a 0.74-mile (1.19 km) stretch of Winchester Creek Road that parallels the westbound side of US 50 and US 301 between VFW Avenue (MD 18W) and Hissey Road (MD 835I) in Grasonville. MD 835H features a right-in/right-out interchange (Exit 44B) with the westbound freeway.
- MD 835I is the designation for a 0.20-mile (0.32 km) segment of Hissey Road from a right-in/right-out interchange (Exit 45A) with westbound US 50 and US 301 to just north of the highway's intersection with MD 835H in Grasonville.
- MD 835J is the designation for a 0.77-mile (1.24 km) stretch of Winchester Creek Road and Blackbeard Road that parallels the westbound side of US 50 and US 301 between Hissey Road (MD 835I) and the end of state maintenance east of Nesbit Road (MD 835K) and the westbound ramps for Exit 45B in Grasonville.
- MD 835K is the designation for a 0.42-mile (0.68 km) portion of Nesbit Road between MD 18 and a point just north of MD 835J in Grasonville.
- MD 835L is the designation for Greenspring Road, a 0.21-mile (0.34 km) road that runs from US 301 north to MD 18C east of Queenstown. The road was transferred from the county to the state on September 13, 2016.
- MD 835M is the designation for Main Street Spur, a 0.03-mile (0.048 km) road that runs from MD 18C east to MD 835L east of Queenstown. The route was designated in 2016.
- MD 835N is the designation for Tidewater Drive, a 0.09-mile (0.14 km) road that runs from MD 304 north to the end of state maintenance at a park and ride lot east of Centreville. The route was designated in 2018.

Browse numbered routes
← MD 834	→ MD 837

== MD 837 ==
Maryland Route 837
- Location: Sudlersville
- Length: 0.12 mi (190 m)
- Existed: 1962–

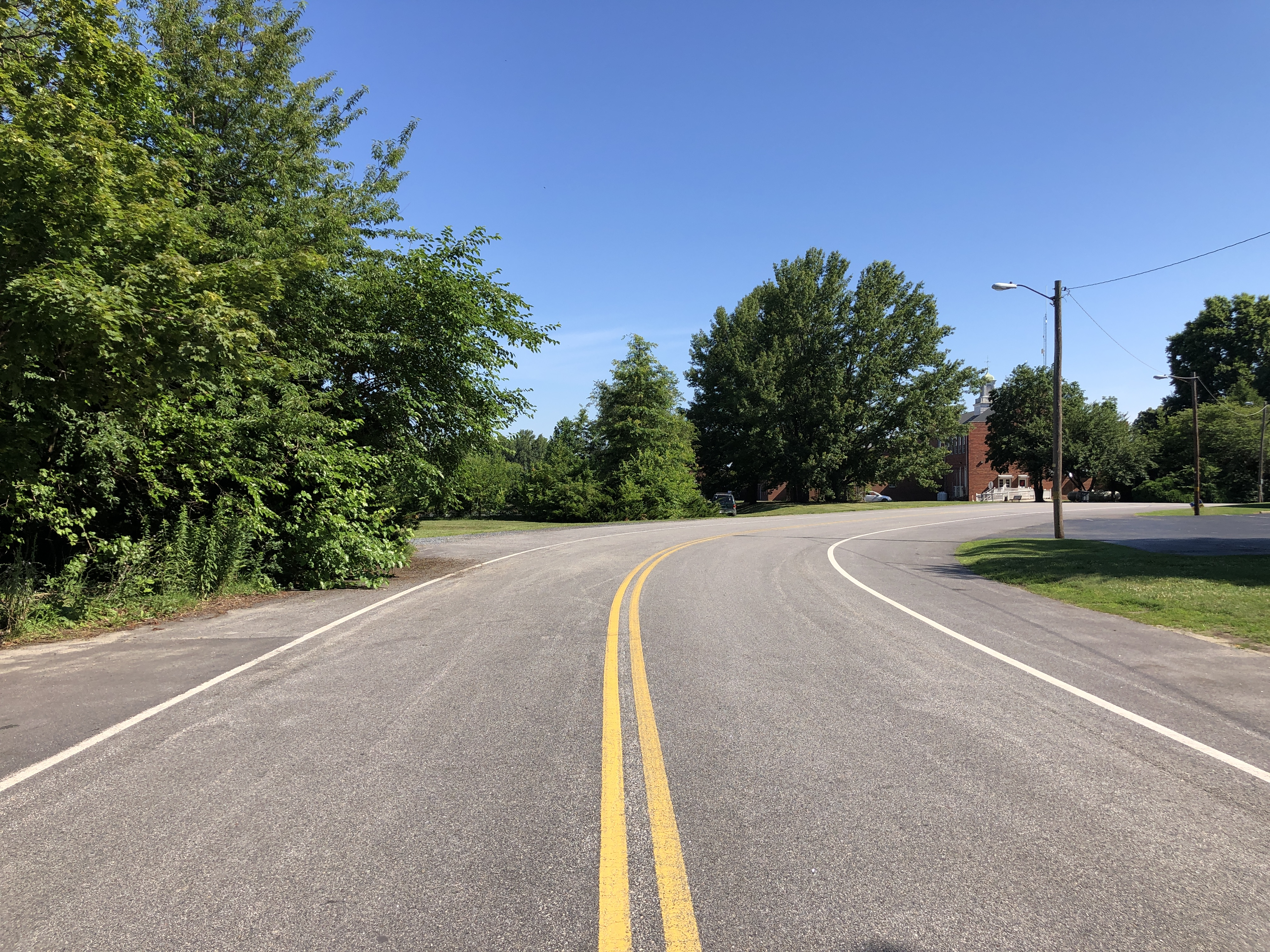
View north along MD 837 at MD 300 in Sudlersville

Maryland Route 837 is the unsigned designation for Church Circle, which runs 0.12 miles (0.19 km) from MD 300 (Main Street) north and east to MD 313 (Church Street) in the northwest quadrant of Sudlersville in northern Queen Anne's County. The road now known as Church Circle was improved as early as 1953, when the Maryland State Roads Commission accepted the 600-foot-long (180 m) road, then known as the High School Cut-Off Road, into the county roads system maintained by the state through a July 8, 1953, resolution. The town of Sudlersville agreed to the transfer of Church Circle from town to state maintenance in August 1962, and the Maryland State Roads Commission effected the change through an October 23, 1962, memorandum of action. The state agreed to take over the road because it was well paved with a wide right of way and provided a bypass of the MD 300–MD 313 intersection with unobstructed views at its termini, in contrast with the dangerous, blind intersection of Main Street and Church Street in the center of town.

=== References ===
Browse numbered routes
← MD 835	→ MD 843

== MD 843 ==
Maryland Route 843
- Location: Williamsport, Huyett

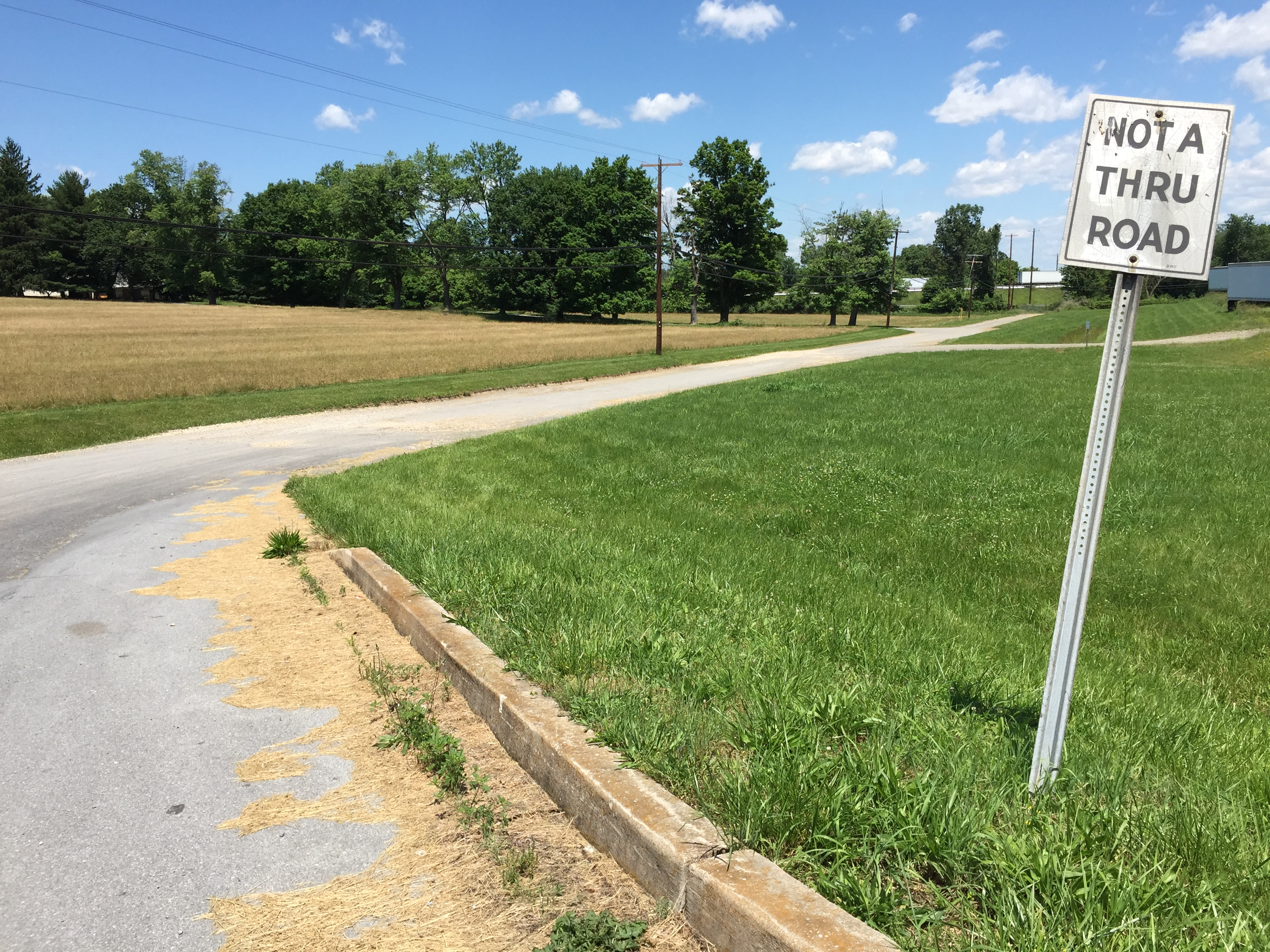
MD 843D at MD 63 near Williamsport

Maryland Route 843 is a collection of unsigned state highways that serve as connections between MD 63 and sections of old alignment of MD 63 between Williamsport and Huyett.

- MD 843B is the designation for Celeste Drive, a 0.12-mile (0.19 km) section of old alignment of MD 63 from a defunct grade crossing of CSX's Lurgan Subdivision north to near Kemps Mill Road on the southbound side of MD 63 north of Williamsport.
- MD 843D is the designation for an unnamed 0.16-mile (0.26 km) section of old alignment of MD 63 from MD 63's curve east to intersect MD 68 north to a dead end at the northbound lanes of I-81 south of Williamsport.
- MD 843F is the designation for an unnamed 0.06-mile (0.097 km) service road from the intersection of MD 63 and French Lane south to a group of homes and businesses adjacent to I-70 immediately northwest of I-70's interchange with MD 63.
- MD 843I is the designation for an unnamed 0.04-mile (0.064 km) connector between MD 63 and Huyett Lane on the northbound side of MD 63 north of MD 63's intersection with US 40 in Huyett.

Browse numbered routes
← MD 837	→ MD 844

== MD 844 ==
Maryland Route 844
- Location: Cavetown
- Length: 0.29 mi (470 m)

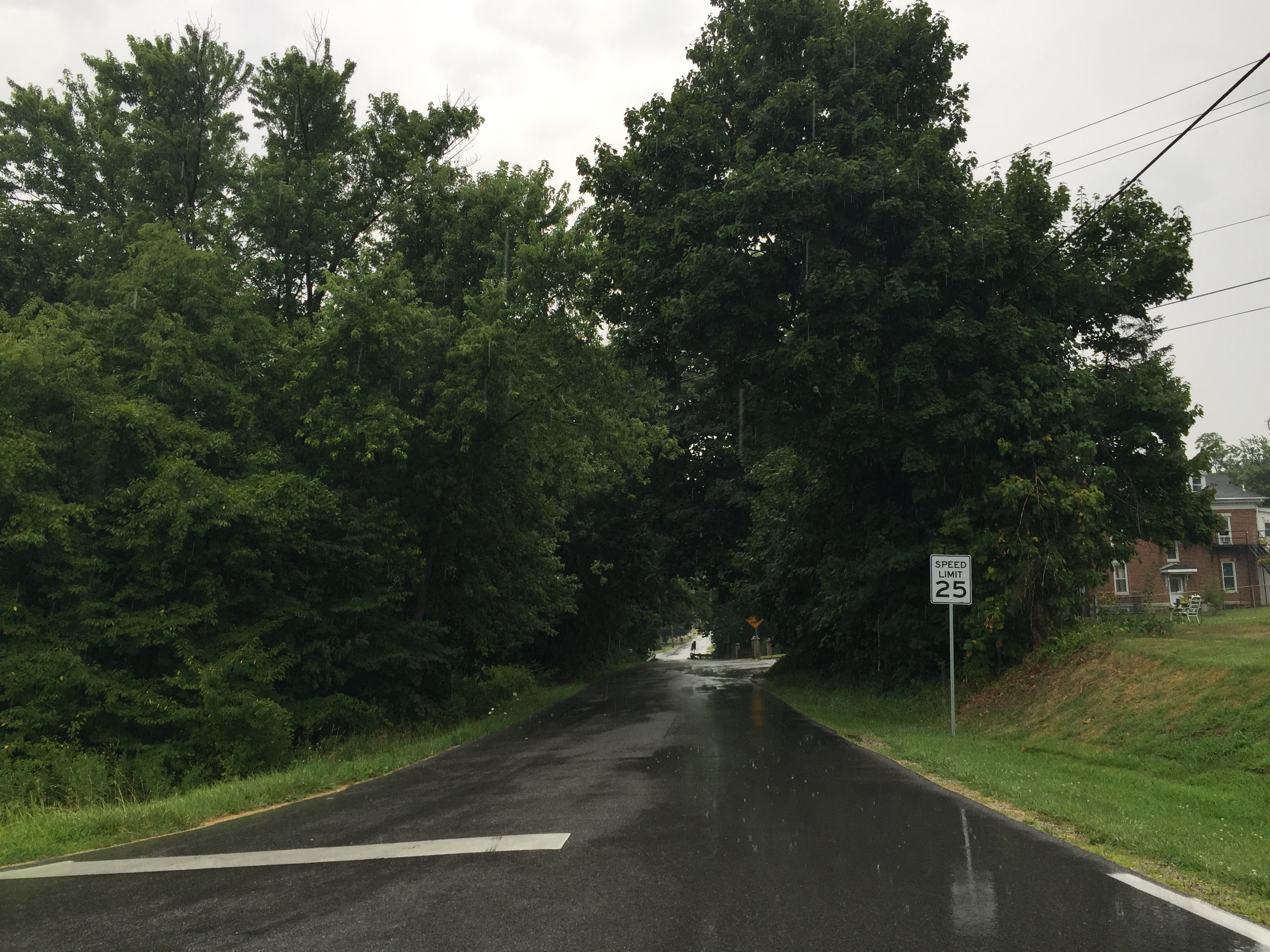
View east along MD 844 at MD 64 in Cavetown

Maryland Route 844 is the unsigned designation for Cavetown Church Road, a 0.29-mile (0.47 km) section of old alignment of MD 77 in Cavetown. The state highway runs from MD 64, where a county-maintained portion of Cavetown Church Road continues west, east past Wolfsville Road to a dead end adjacent to the current alignment of MD 77.

Browse numbered routes
← MD 843	→ MD 845

== MD 846 ==
Maryland Route 846
- Location: Ringgold

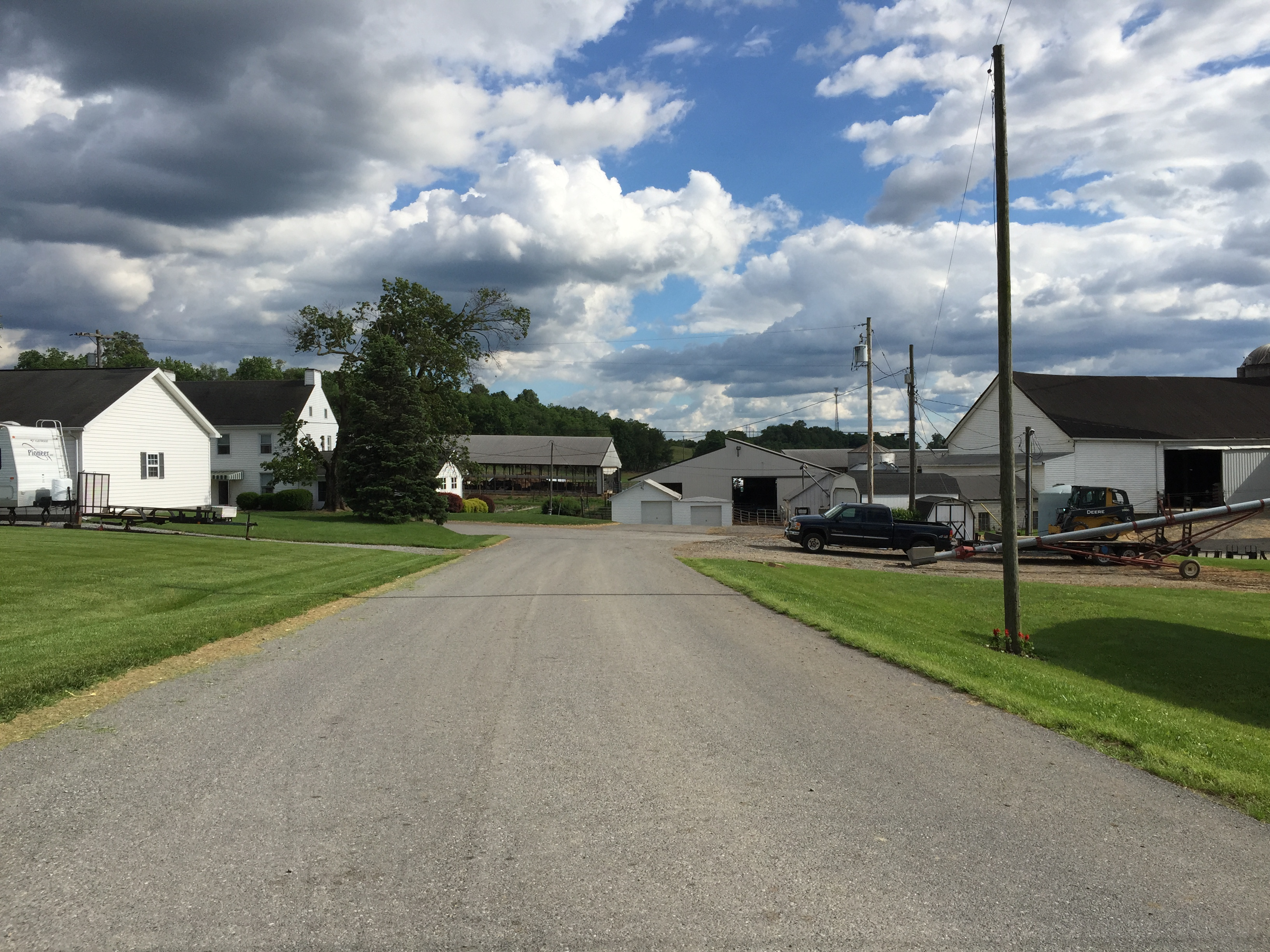
MD 846D at MD 418 in Ringgold

Maryland Route 846 is the unsigned designation for a pair of unnamed roads southeast of the MD 64–MD 418 junction in Ringgold.

- MD 846B is a 0.10-mile (0.16 km) section of old alignment of MD 418 on the eastbound side of that highway.
- MD 846D is a 0.04-mile (0.064 km) connector between MD 418 and MD 846B.

Browse numbered routes
← MD 845	→ MD 847

== MD 847 ==
Maryland Route 847
- Location: Smithsburg
- Length: 0.14 mi (230 m)

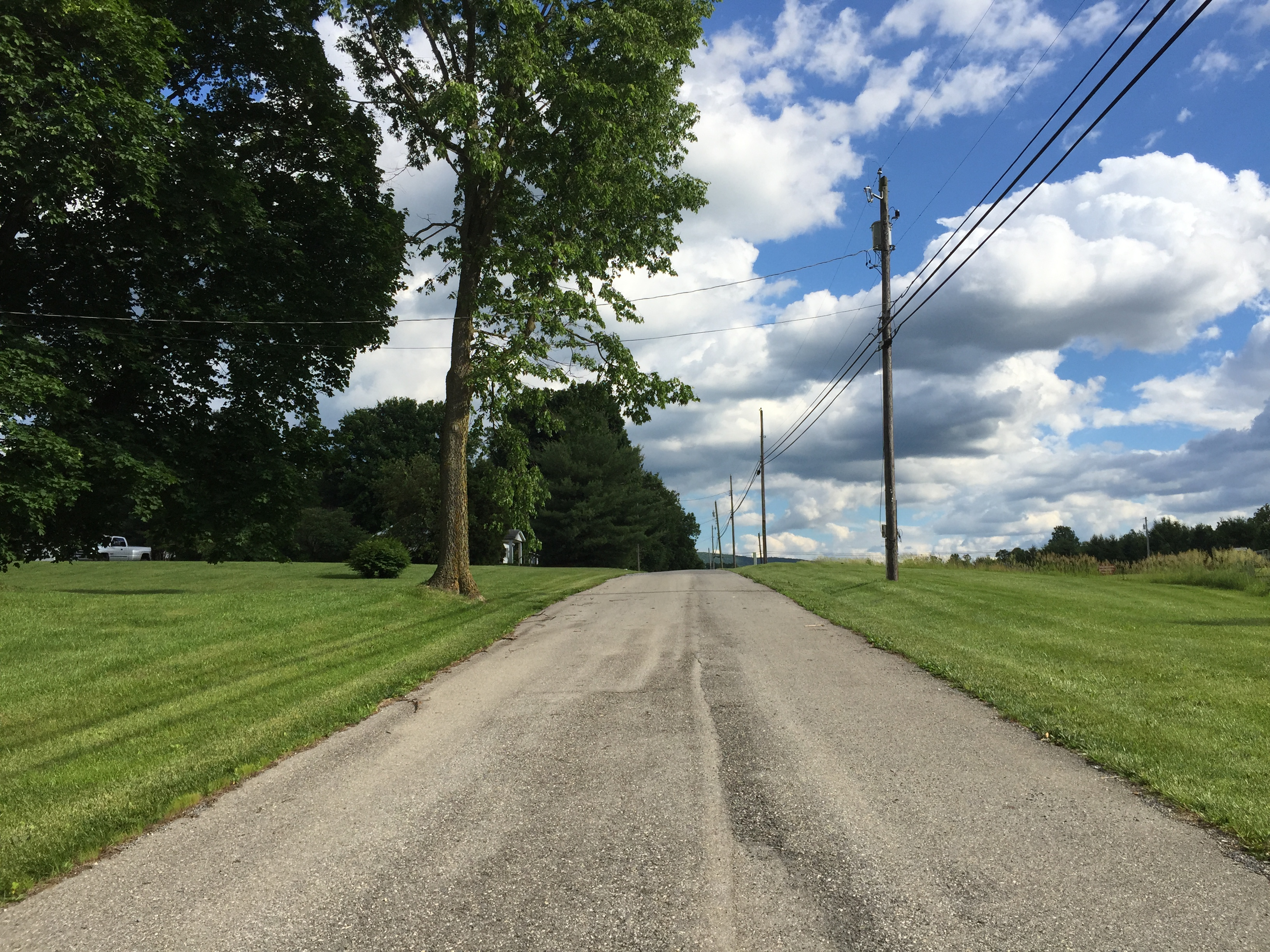
View south at the north end of MD 847 near Smithsburg

Maryland Route 847 (officially MD 847D) is the unsigned designation for Fritz Lane, a 0.14-mile (0.23 km) section of old alignment of MD 64 from Welty Church Road north to a dead end, paralleling the northbound side of MD 64 north of Smithsburg.

Browse numbered routes
← MD 846	→ MD 849

== MD 849 ==
Maryland Route 849
- Location: Mexico
- Length: 0.36 mi (580 m)

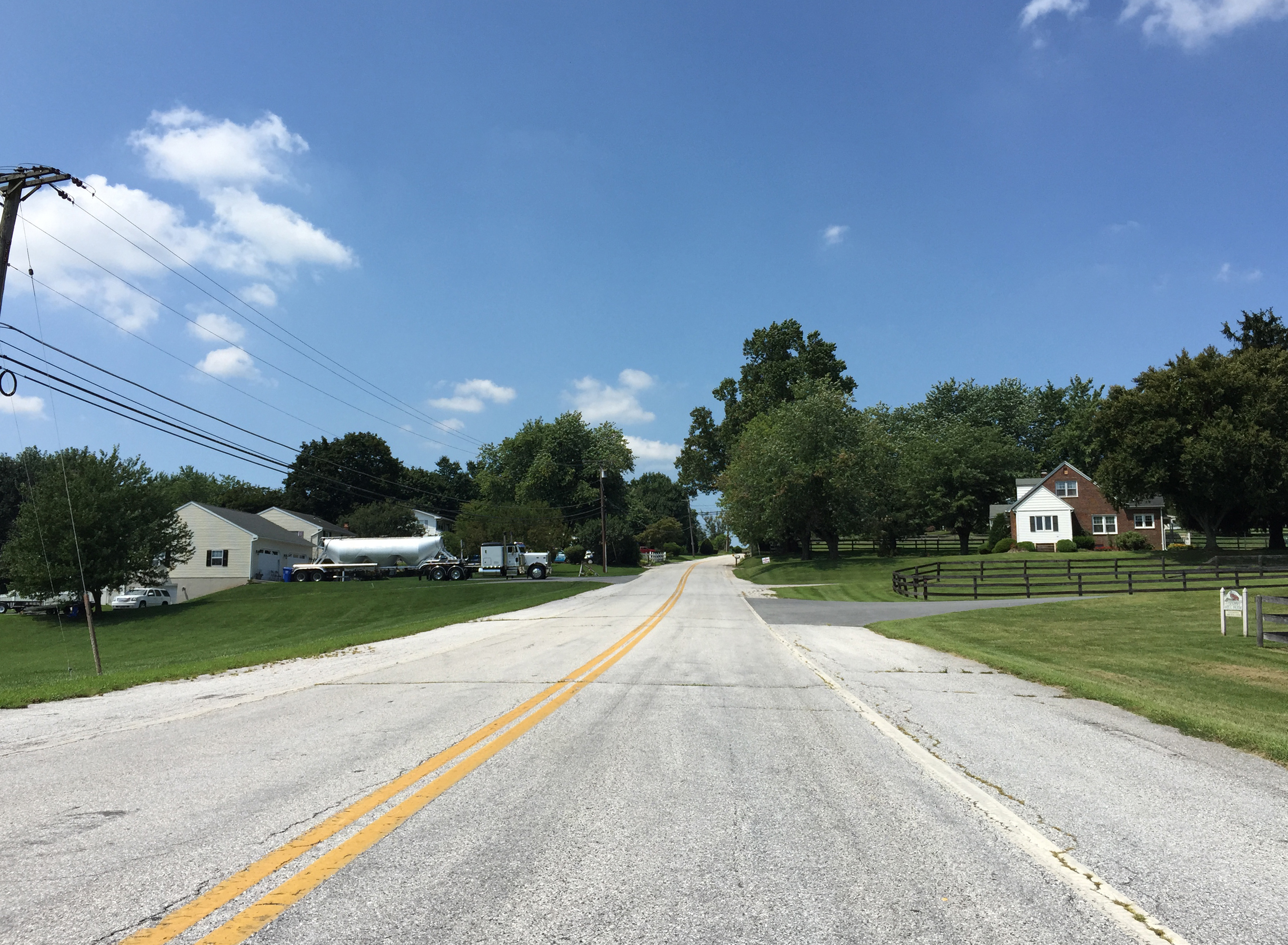
View west along MD 849 at MD 482 in Mexico

Maryland Route 849 is the unsigned designation for the 0.36-mile (0.58 km) section of Leisters Church Road between MD 852 and MD 482 in Mexico.

Browse numbered routes
← MD 847	→ MD 850

== MD 853 ==
Maryland Route 853
- Location: Taneytown

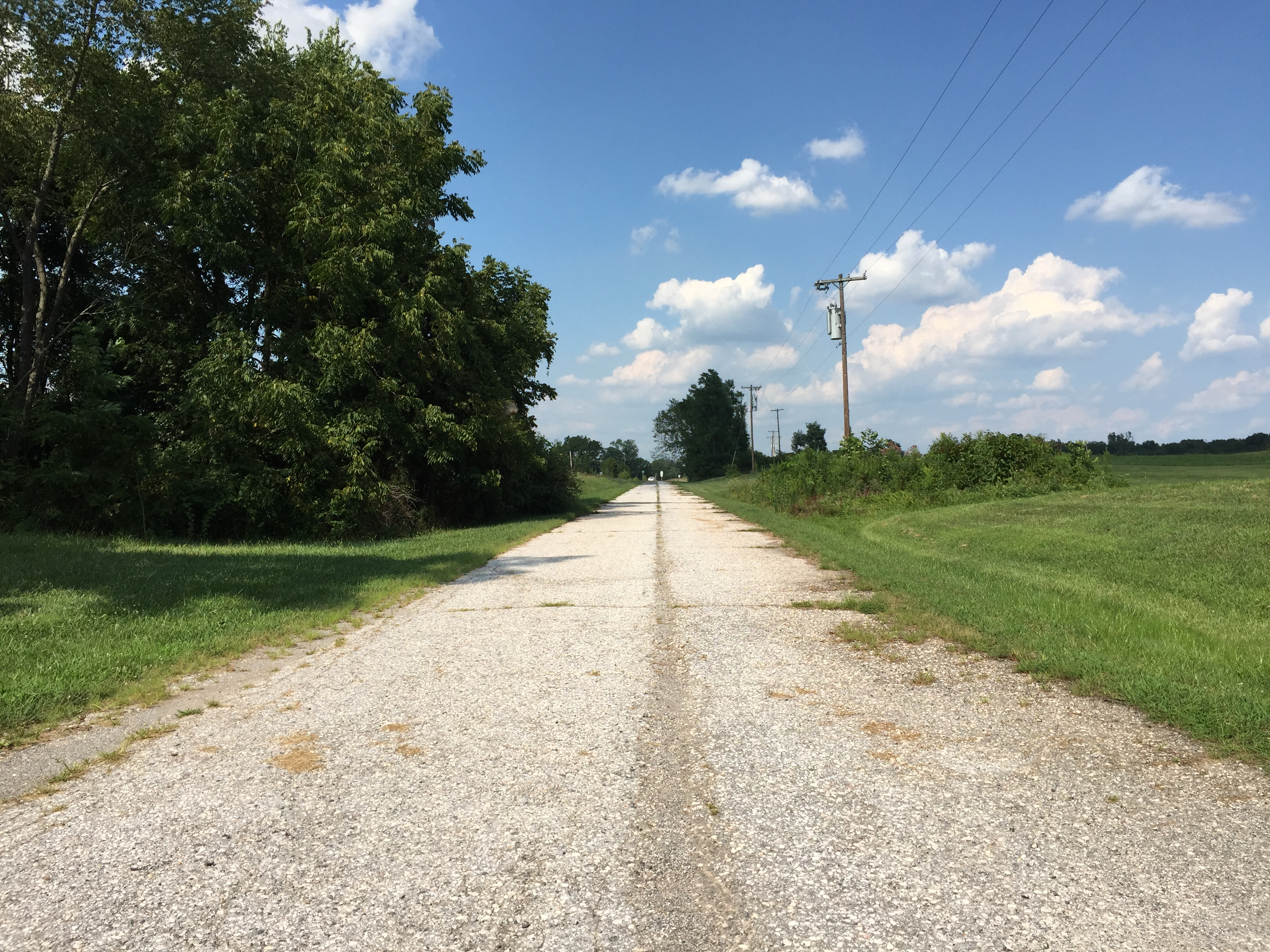
View north along MD 853F north of Taneytown

Maryland Route 853 is the unsigned designation for four sections of old alignment of MD 194 between Taneytown and the Pennsylvania state line in northwestern Carroll County.

- MD 853A is the designation for the unnamed 0.12-mile (0.19 km) section between two dead ends on the southbound side of MD 194 a short distance south of the state line. MD 853A is connected to MD 194 by MD 194E.
- MD 853C is the designation for the unnamed 0.08-mile (0.13 km) section from a dead end north to Stone Road on the northbound side of MD 194 south of Piney Creek.
- MD 853E is the designation for the unnamed 0.25-mile (0.40 km) section on the northbound side of MD 194 from MD 194D north to an intersection with Angell Road north of Taneytown. In 2015, the section of road from Angell Road north to a dead end was removed.
- MD 853F is the designation for the unnamed 0.17-mile (0.27 km) section on the northbound side of MD 194 from a dead end just north of MD 853E's northern terminus to Brown Road. In 2016, the route was shortened by 0.03 miles (0.048 km).

Browse numbered routes
← MD 852	→ MD 854

== MD 855 ==
Maryland Route 855
- Location: Harmony Corner, Hassengers Corner

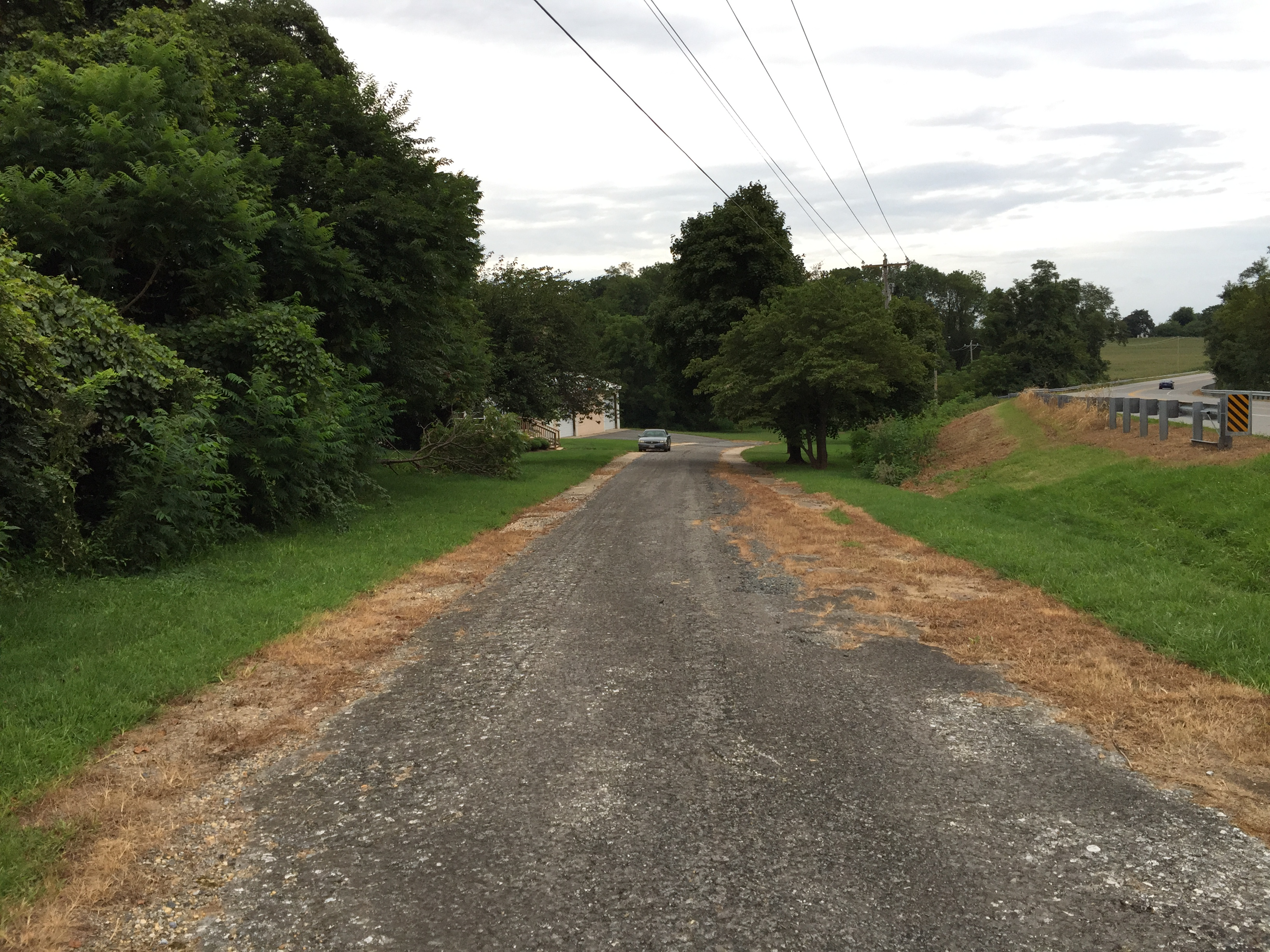
MD 855A at MD 213 in Hassengers Corner

Maryland Route 855 is the unsigned designation for a pair of unnamed highways that are pieces of old alignment of MD 213 (Augustine Herman Highway) in Kent County.

- MD 855 is the designation for the 0.06-mile-long (0.097 km) loop of old alignment on the southbound side of MD 213 west of that highway's intersection with MD 298 at Harmony Corner. The highway was assigned after US 213 was reconstructed and relocated between Kennedyville and Locust Grove in 1948 and 1949.
- MD 855A is the unsigned designation for the 0.07-mile-long (0.11 km) spur of old alignment on the southbound side of MD 213 southwest of that highway's intersection with MD 561 at Hassengers Corner. The highway was assigned after US 213 was reconstructed and relocated from north of Chestertown to Kennedyville in 1955 and 1956.

=== References ===
Browse numbered routes
← MD 854	→ MD 856

== MD 856 ==
Maryland Route 856
- Location: Lynch
- Length: 0.10 mi (160 m)
- Existed: 1959–

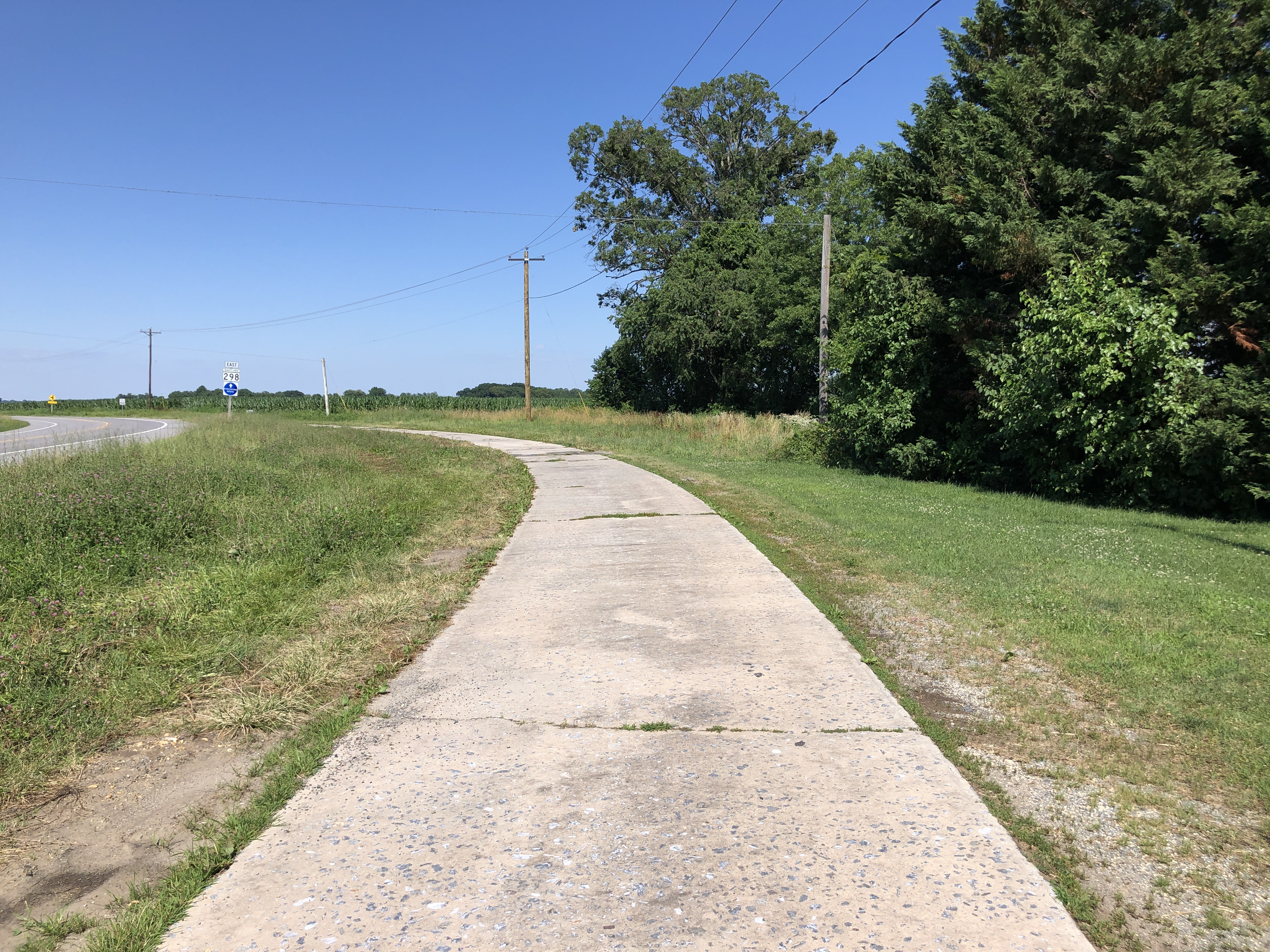
MD 856 at Lynch with MD 298 visible in the background

Maryland Route 856 is the unsigned designation for Old Lynch Road, which runs 0.10 miles (0.16 km) between a pair of intersections with MD 298 just east of that highway's intersection with MD 561 at Lynch in northern Kent County. The road was constructed as part of MD 298 as a concrete road in 1930. Old Lynch Road was bypassed when MD 298 was relocated to a smoother curve when the highway was widened in 1951 and 1952. The highway received the MD 856 designation in 1959.

=== References ===
Browse numbered routes
← MD 855	→ MD 858

== MD 863 ==
Maryland Route 863A
- Location: Charlotte Hall
- Length: 0.20 mi (320 m)

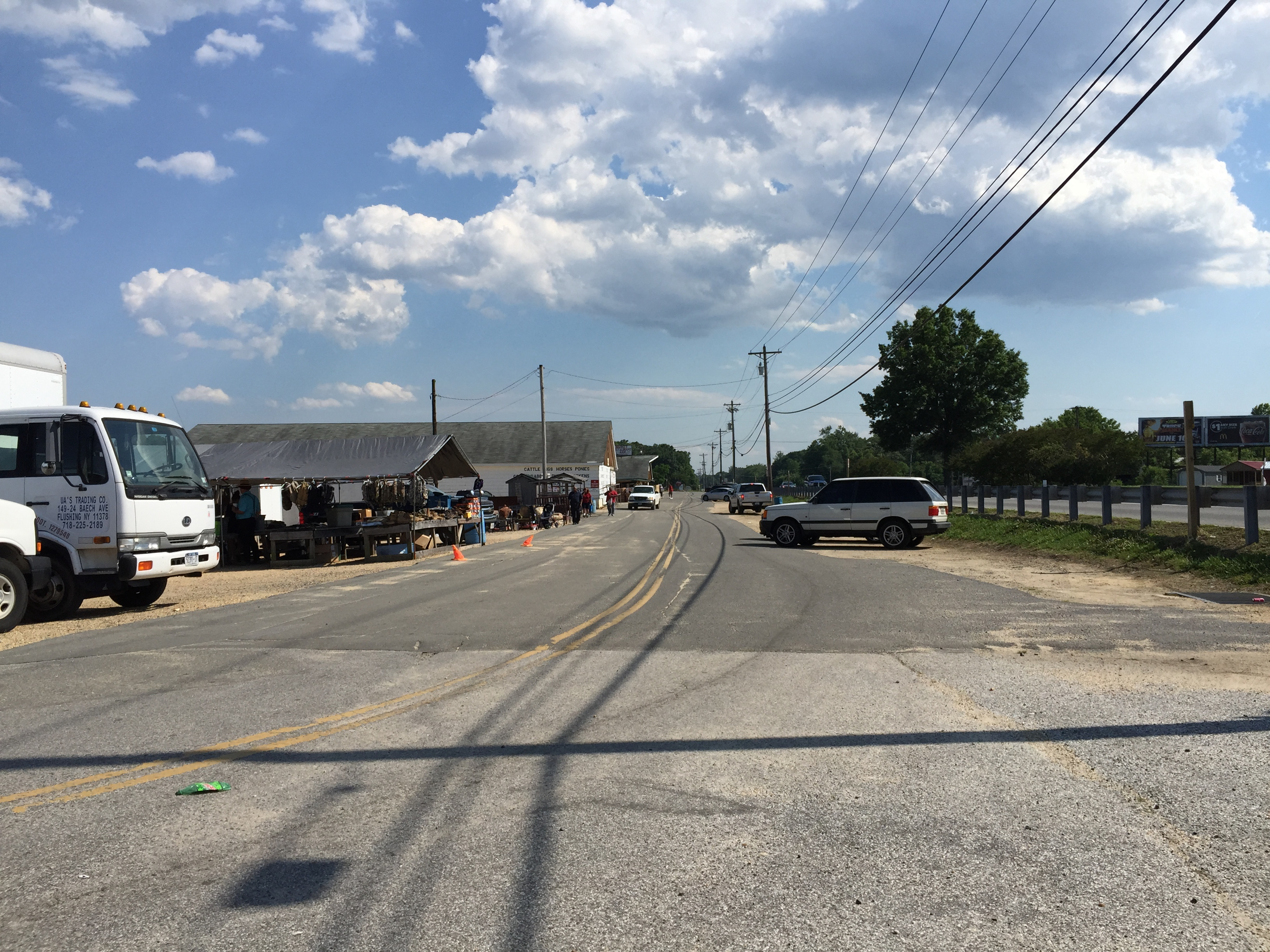
View south along MD 863A in Charlotte Hall

Maryland Route 863 (officially MD 863A) is the unsigned designation for the unnamed 0.20-mile (0.32 km) service road that closely parallels the northbound direction of MD 5 from north of MD 6 to south of Golden Beach Road in Charlotte Hall. The route provides access to a farmers market.

Browse numbered routes
← MD 858	→ MD 864

== MD 864 ==
Maryland Route 864
- Location: Still Pond
- Length: 0.11 mi (180 m)
- Existed: 1968–

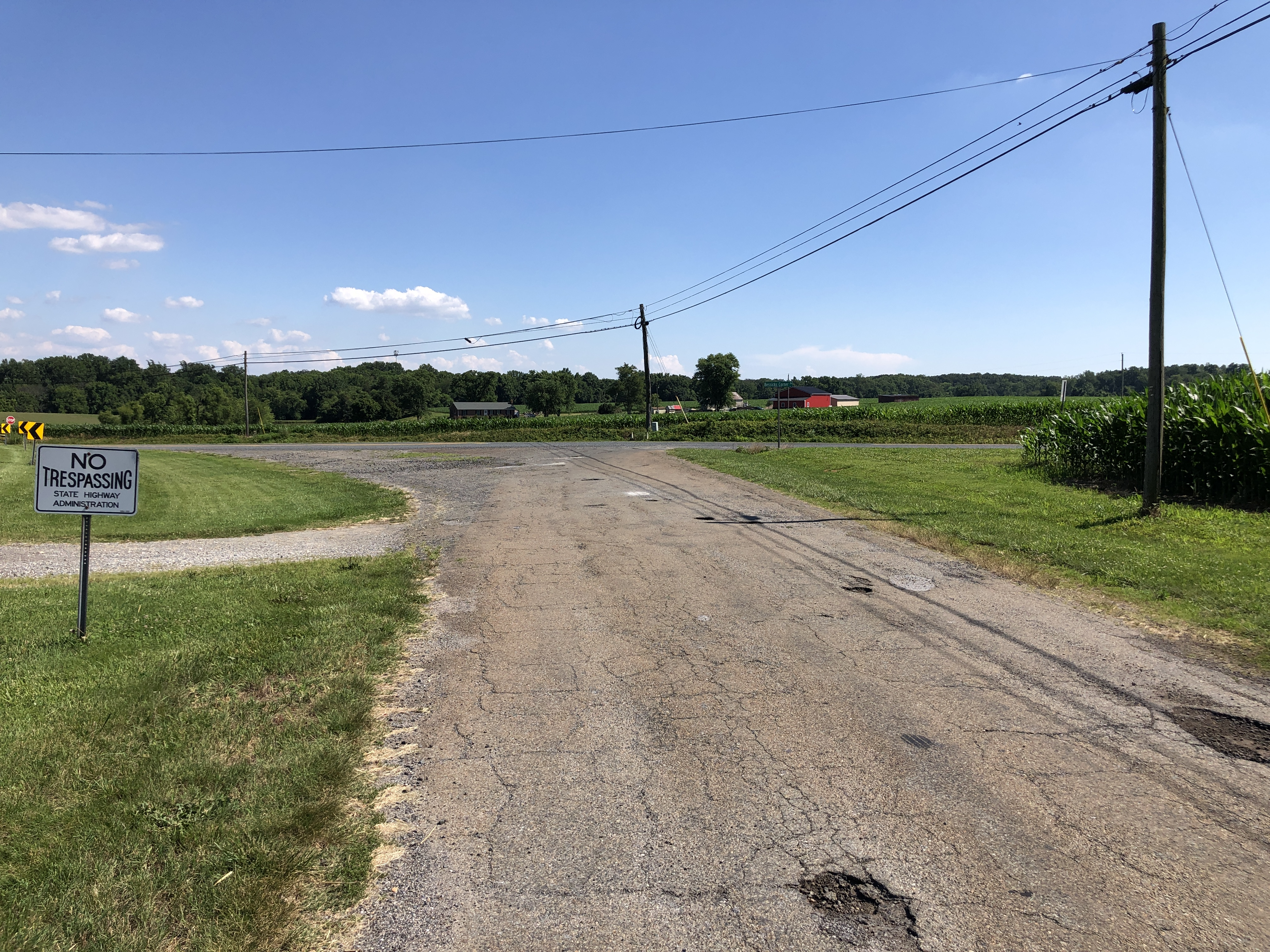
MD 864 at MD 292 in Still Pond

Maryland Route 864 is the unsigned designation for Bessicks Corner Road, which runs 0.11 miles (0.18 km) between a pair of intersections with MD 292 on either side of county-maintained Bessicks Corner Road west of Still Pond in northern Kent County. The road was originally constructed by Kent County with state aid as part of the 9-foot-wide (2.7 m) macadam road between Still Pond and Betterton by 1915, and MD 292 from Still Pond to Betterton was widened in 1948. MD 864 was assigned to its present course when MD 292 was moved to its smoother curve as part of a 1968 resurfacing project.

=== References ===
Browse numbered routes
← MD 863	→ MD 868

== MD 868 ==
Maryland Route 868G
- Location: Budds Creek
- Length: 0.07 mi (110 m)

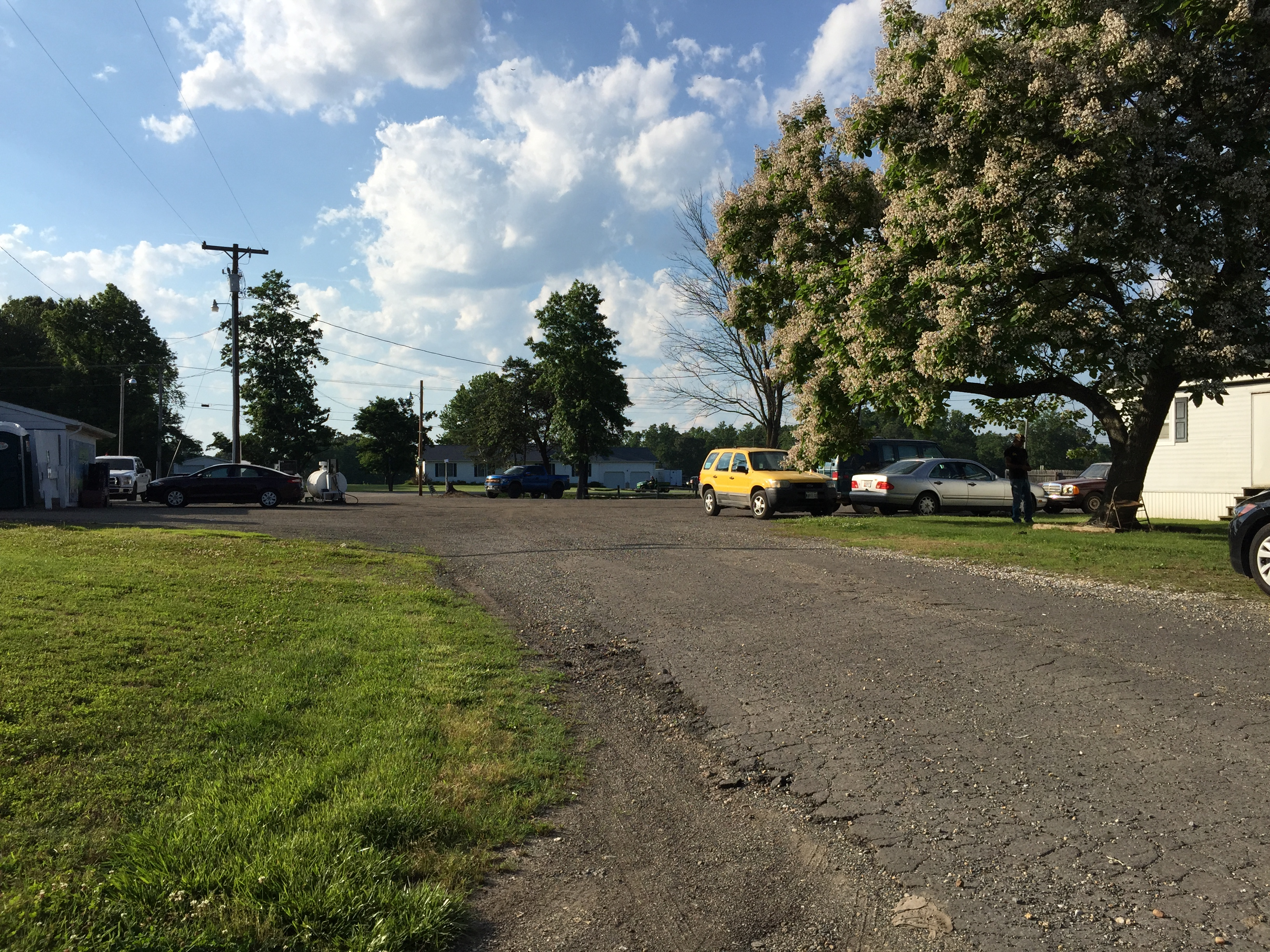
MD 868 in Budds Creek

Maryland Route 868 (officially MD 868G) is the designation for the 0.07-mile (0.11 km) section of Stone Corner Lane, a spur of old alignment of MD 234 that heads east from MD 236 in Budds Creek.

Browse numbered routes
← MD 864	→ MD 870

== MD 870 ==
Maryland Route 870G
- Location: Frederick
- Length: 0.20 mi (320 m)

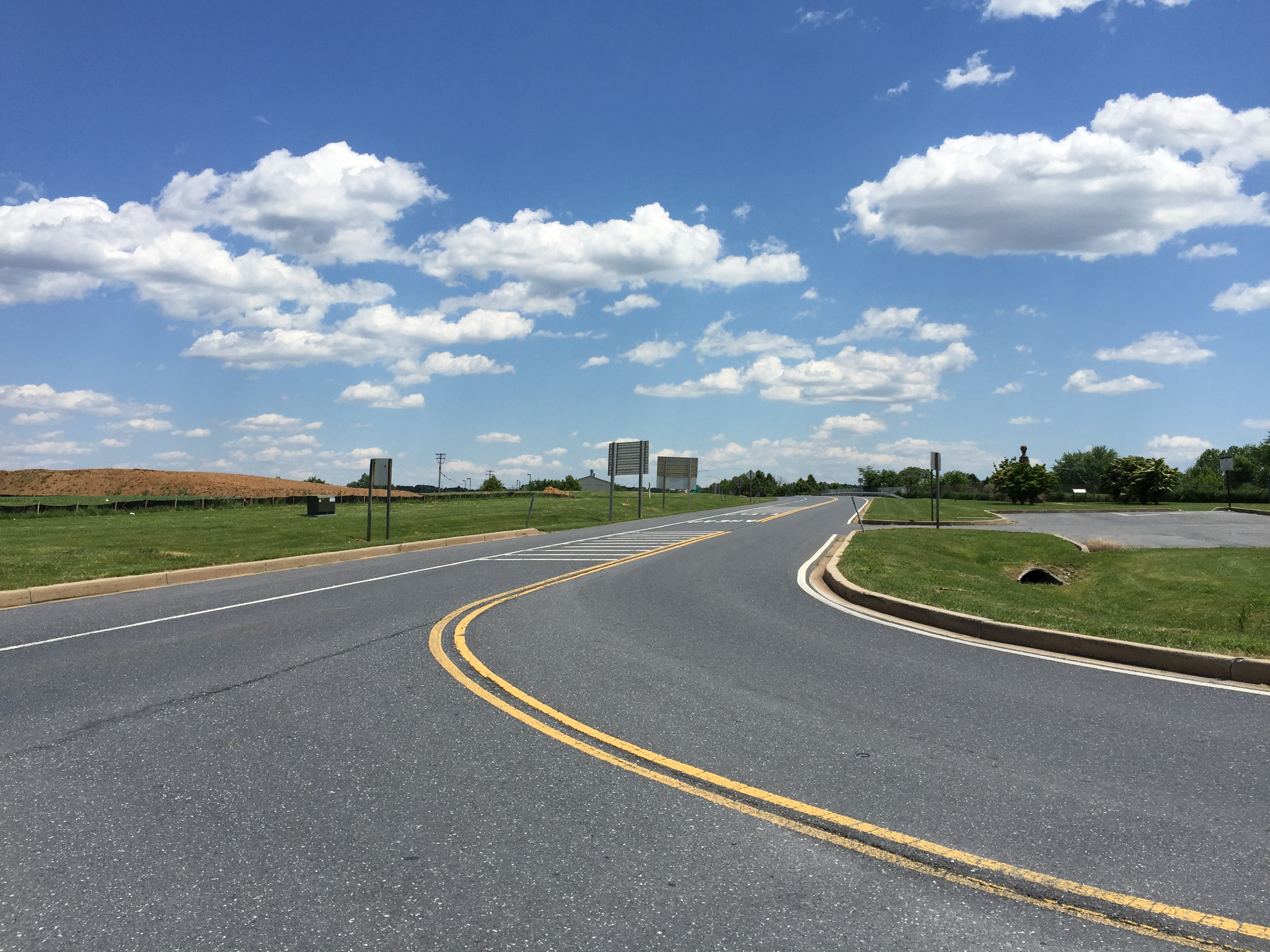
View east at the west end of MD 870 at MD 144 in Frederick

Maryland Route 870 (officially MD 870G) is the designation for the unnamed 0.20-mile (0.32 km) section of the old alignment of US 40 (now MD 144) adjacent to Exit 56 of I-70 in Frederick. The state highway connects MD 144 (officially MD 144FA) with the ramp from westbound I-70 to MD 144, an emergency ramp onto westbound I-70, and to Bowmans Farm Road, which serves a pair of farms, the Frederick County Sheriff's Office, and the Maryland Motor Vehicle Administration's Frederick center. MD 870G is one-way westbound between a two-way spur to MD 144 and its western end tangent to MD 144.

Browse numbered routes
← MD 868	→ MD 871

== MD 871 ==
Maryland Route 871
- Location: Rosemont

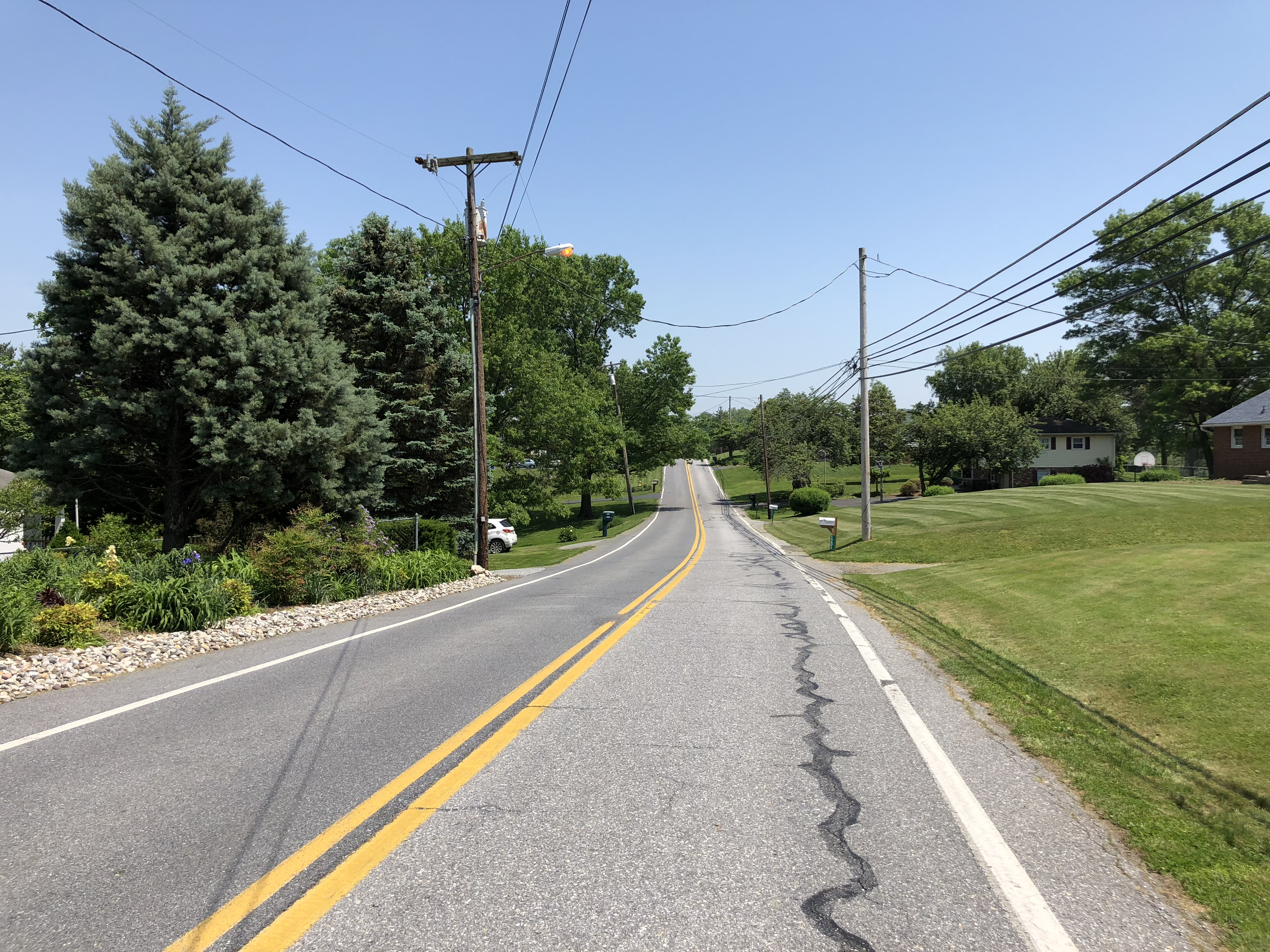
View east along MD 871G in Rosemont

Maryland Route 871 is the designation for a pair of sections of old alignment of MD 17 in Rosemont.

- MD 871F is the unnamed 0.11-mile (0.18 km) segment from MD 180 west to a dead end adjacent to US 340. This section is south of MD 180's intersection with MD 17.
- MD 871G is the designation for Rosemont Drive, which runs 0.94 miles (1.51 km) from MD 79 west to MD 17 east of the MD 17–MD 180 intersection. Rosemont Drive serves as the main street of the village of Rosemont.

Browse numbered routes
← MD 870	→ MD 872

== MD 872 ==
Maryland Route 872
- Location: Petersville
- Length: 0.33 mi (530 m)

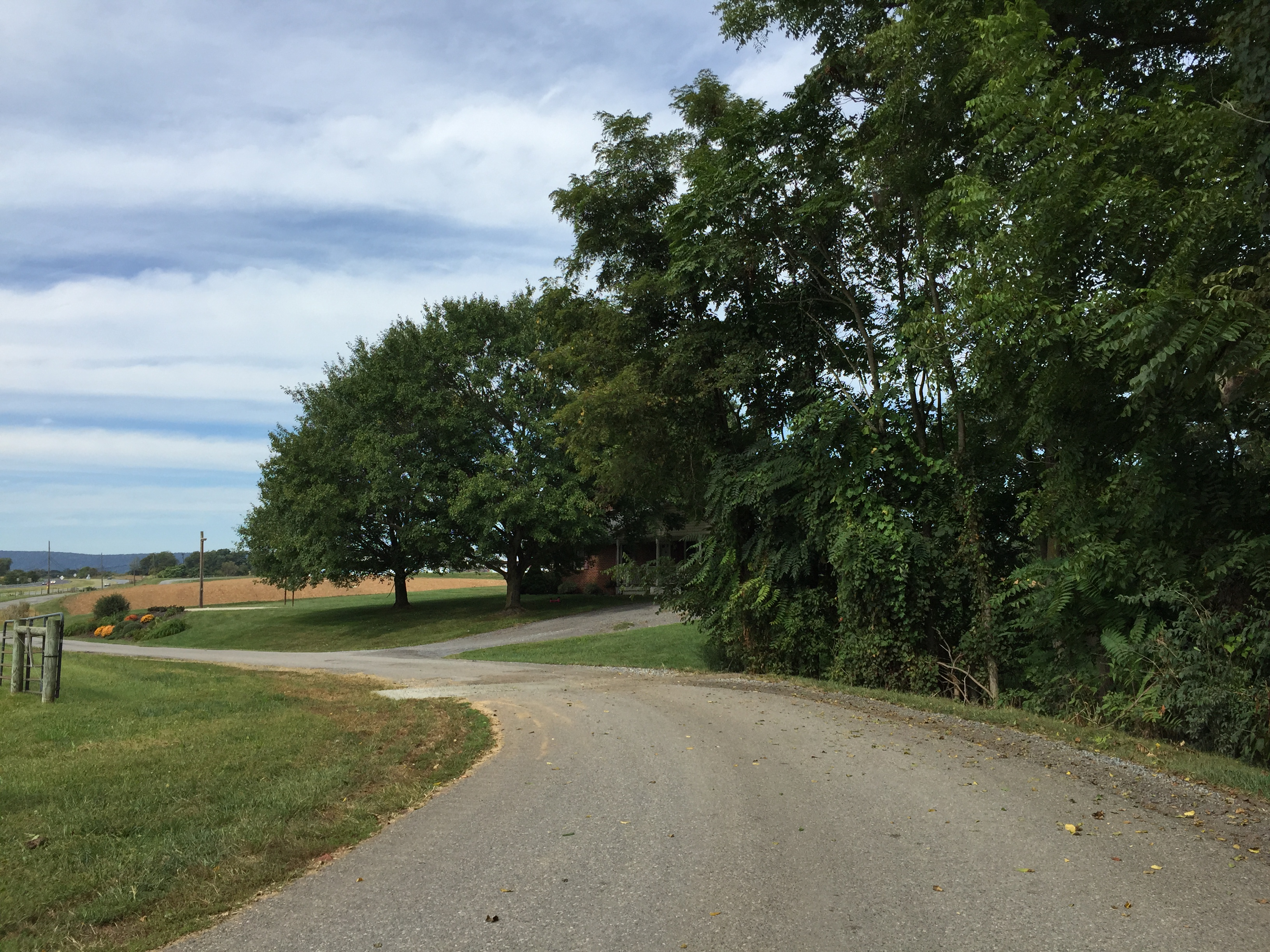
View west along MD 872 at MD 180 near Petersville

Maryland Route 872 is the designation for the unnamed 0.33-mile (0.53 km) service road that parallels the westbound direction of US 340 west from MD 180 near Petersville.

- MD 872G is the designation for a 0.08-mile (0.13 km) section of Jefferson Technology Parkway at its interchange with US 15/US 340 in Frederick. The route was designated on October 31, 2016.

Browse numbered routes
← MD 871	→ MD 874

== MD 874 ==
Maryland Route 874
- Location: New Market–New London

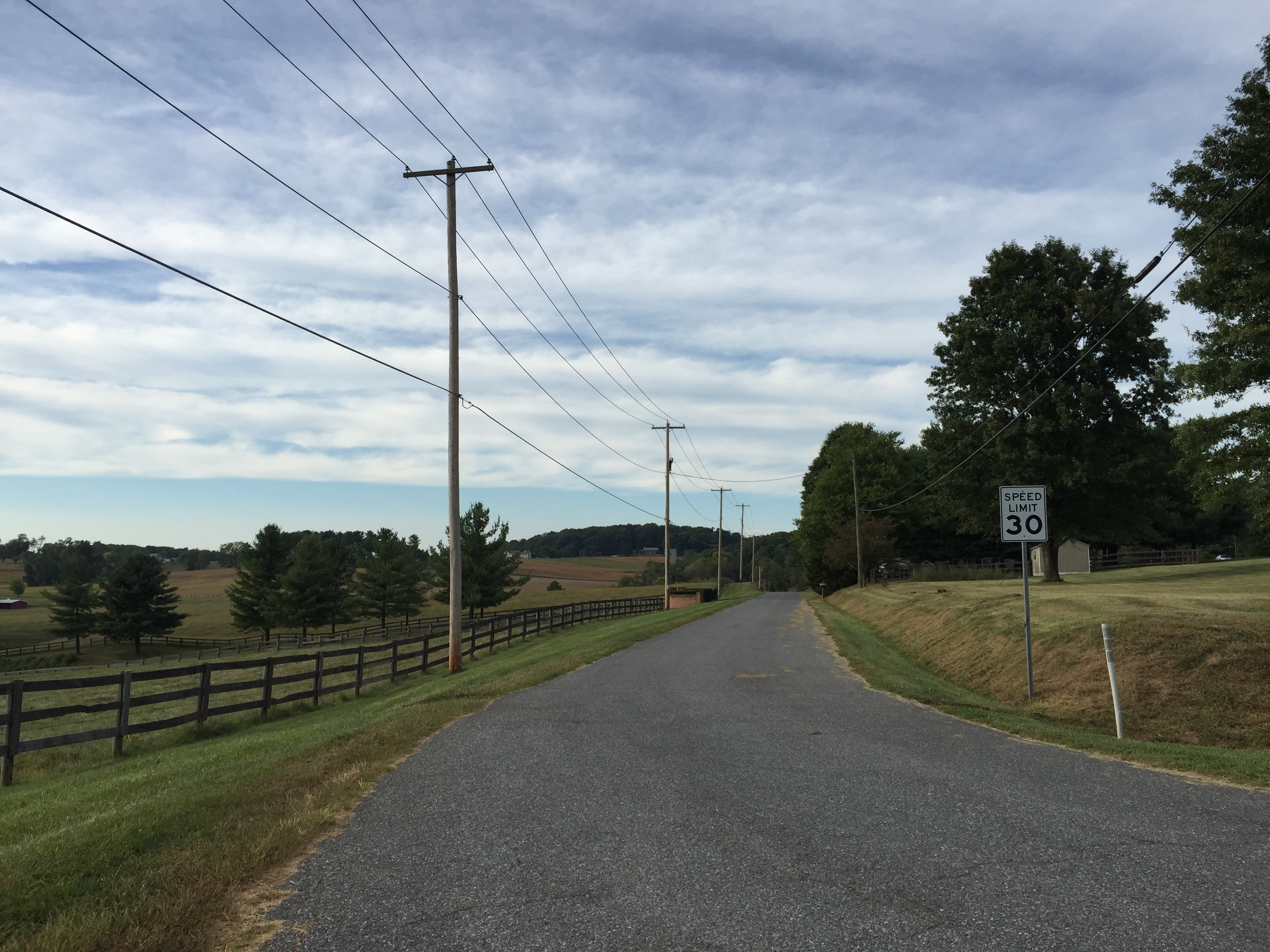
View north along former MD 874 north of MD 75, just before this section was transferred to county maintenance

Maryland Route 874 is the designation for two sections of old alignment of MD 75 between New Market and New London in eastern Frederick County.

- MD 874 was a 0.56-mile (0.90 km) loop of old alignment of MD 75 north of New London. The state highway ran north from MD 75 as Drummine Road on the southbound side of MD 75. At Central Church Road, MD 874 assumed that street name to its northern end at MD 75. The route was transferred to county maintenance on October 31, 2016.
- MD 874B is the unnamed designation for the 0.06-mile (0.097 km) section of old alignment of MD 75 parallel to the southbound side of the highway north of MD 75's intersection with Old New Market Road.
- MD 874D was the designation for Prospect Street, a 0.08-mile (0.13 km) section of old alignment of MD 75 between MD 144FB (Main Street) and the northern town limit of New Market, where the highway continues north as county-maintained Old New Market Road to MD 75. The road was transferred to the town of New Market in an agreement dated December 14, 2011.
- MD 874E is the unnamed designation for the 0.14-mile (0.23 km) section of old alignment of MD 75 from a dead end north to the intersection of Crickenberger Road and New London Road on the southbound side of MD 75 north of New Market. The old alignment continues north as county-maintained New London Road north toward New London.

Browse numbered routes
← MD 872	→ MD 877

== MD 877 ==
Maryland Route 877B
- Location: New Market
- Length: 0.60 mi (970 m)

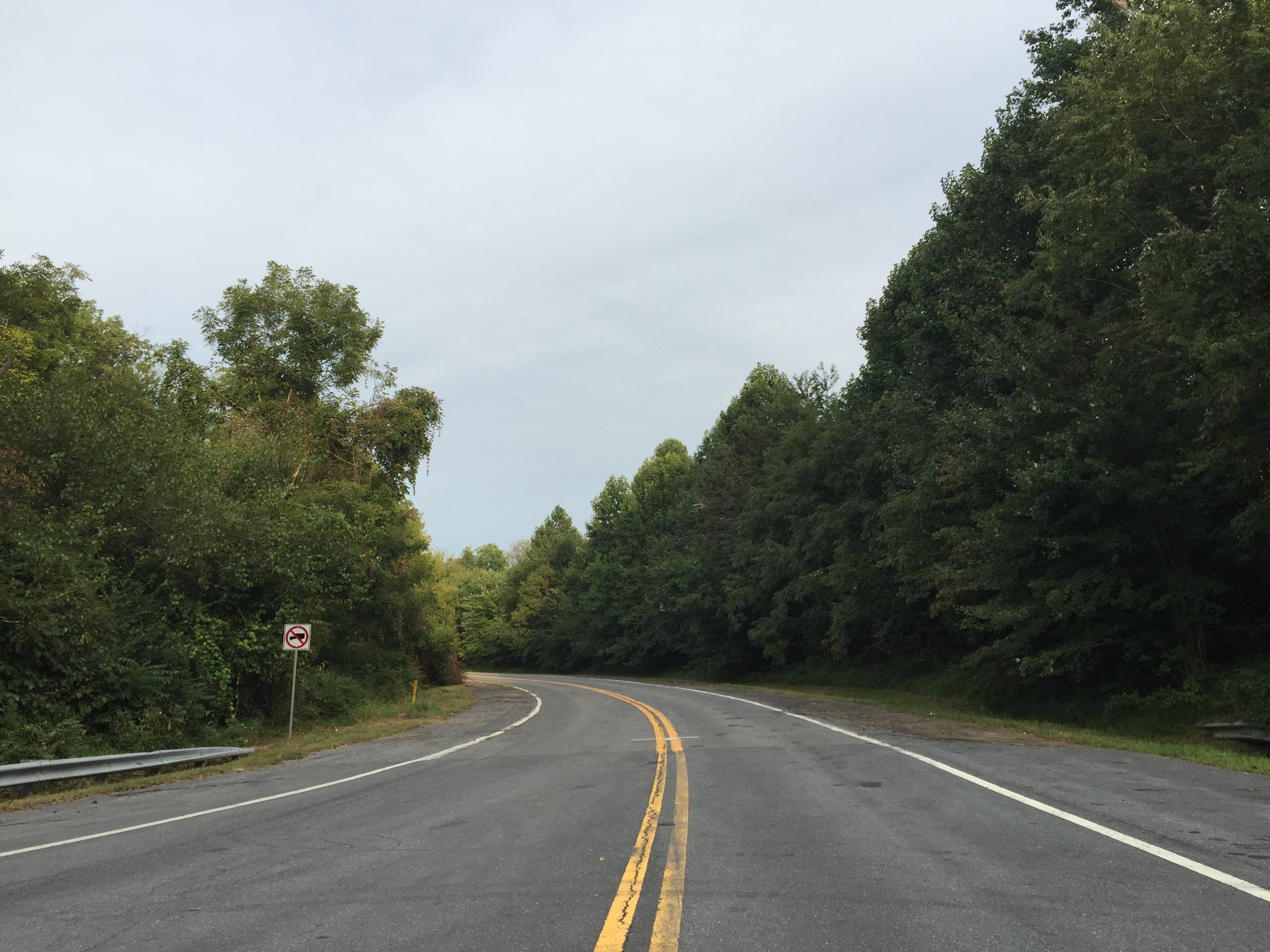
View east along MD 877 at MD 75 near New Market

Maryland Route 877 (officially MD 877B) is the designation for East Baldwin Road, a 0.60-mile (0.97 km) service road that heads east from a right-angle turn in MD 75 just south of that highway's interchange with I-70 in New Market. MD 877 curves northeast then parallels the eastbound direction of I-70 to its end at a farm.

Browse numbered routes
← MD 874	→ MD 879

== MD 879 ==
Maryland Route 879
- Location: Gamber–Finksburg

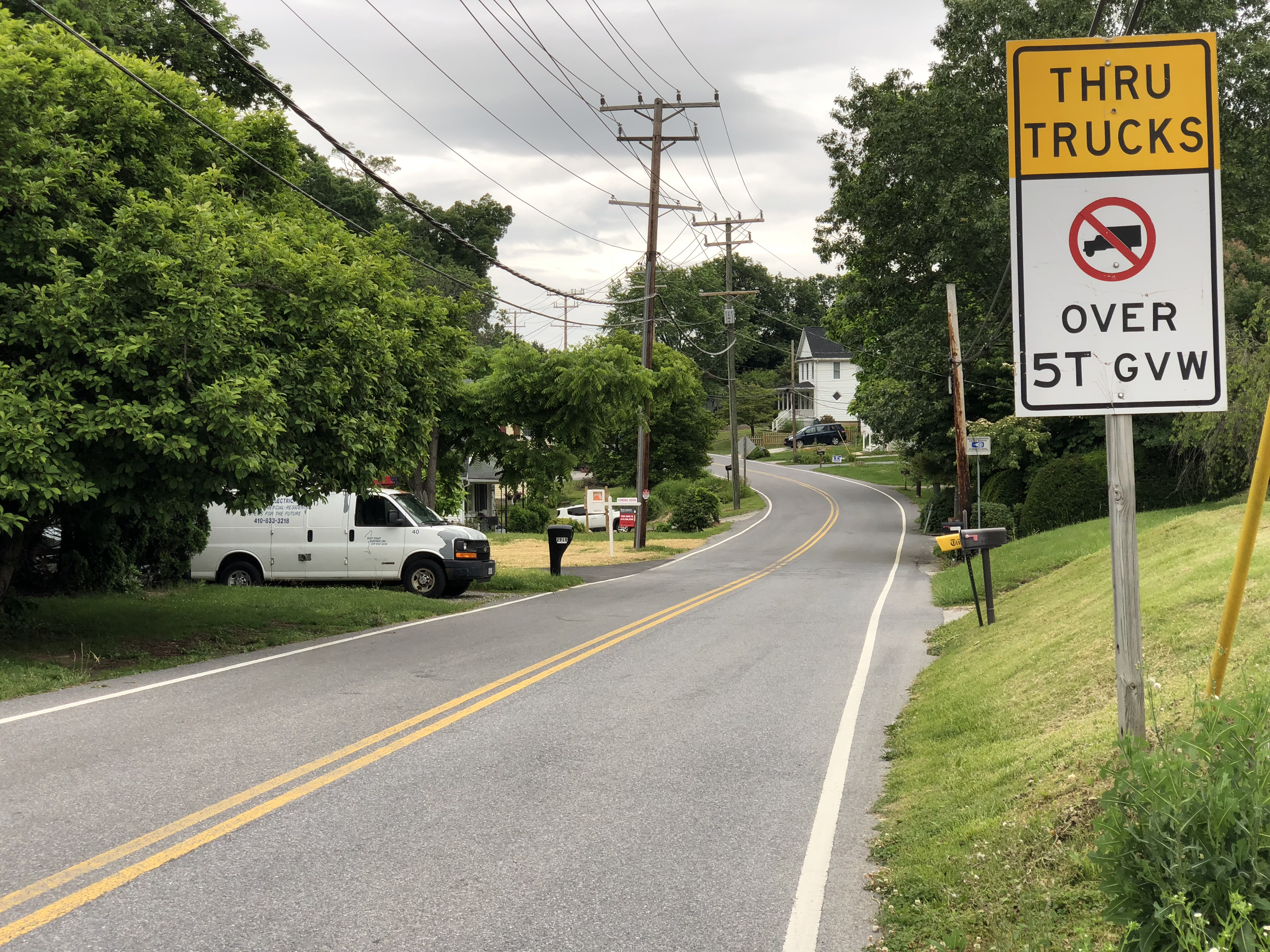
View north along MD 879D at MD 140 in Finksburg

Maryland Route 879 is the designation for five sections of old alignment of MD 91 between Gamber and Finksburg in eastern Carroll County.

- MD 879 is the designation for Old Gamber Road, which runs 0.20 miles (0.32 km) on the northbound side of MD 91 from a dead end north to MD 91 south of Middle Run near Gamber.
- MD 879A was the designation for the unnamed 0.09-mile (0.14 km) section of old alignment of MD 91 between a pair of dead ends on the southbound side of MD 91. MD 879A was connected to MD 91 by MD 91A. The road was removed in 2012.
- MD 879B is the designation for Old Gamber Road, a 0.58 miles (0.93 km) loop of old alignment of MD 91 on the southbound side of the main highway south of Beaver Run between Gamber and Finksburg.
- MD 879C is the designation for the unnamed 0.06-mile (0.097 km) spur of old alignment of MD 91 on the northbound side of the main highway just south of Beaver Run.
- MD 879D is the designation for the 0.91-mile (1.46 km) loop of old alignment of MD 91 on the northbound side of the main highway in Finksburg. MD 879D is named Old Gamber Road south of its intersection with MD 140 and Cedarhurst Road north of MD 140. The northern terminus of the state highway is just south of where MD 91 crosses the North Branch of the Patapsco River and the Maryland Midland Railway.
- MD 879E is the unnamed designation for the 0.15-mile (0.24 km) section of old alignment of MD 91 on the northbound side of the main highway from a dead end at the Maryland Midland Railway to MD 91.

Browse numbered routes
← MD 877	→ MD 889

== MD 889 ==
Maryland Route 889
- Location: Hereford
- Length: 0.10 mi (160 m)

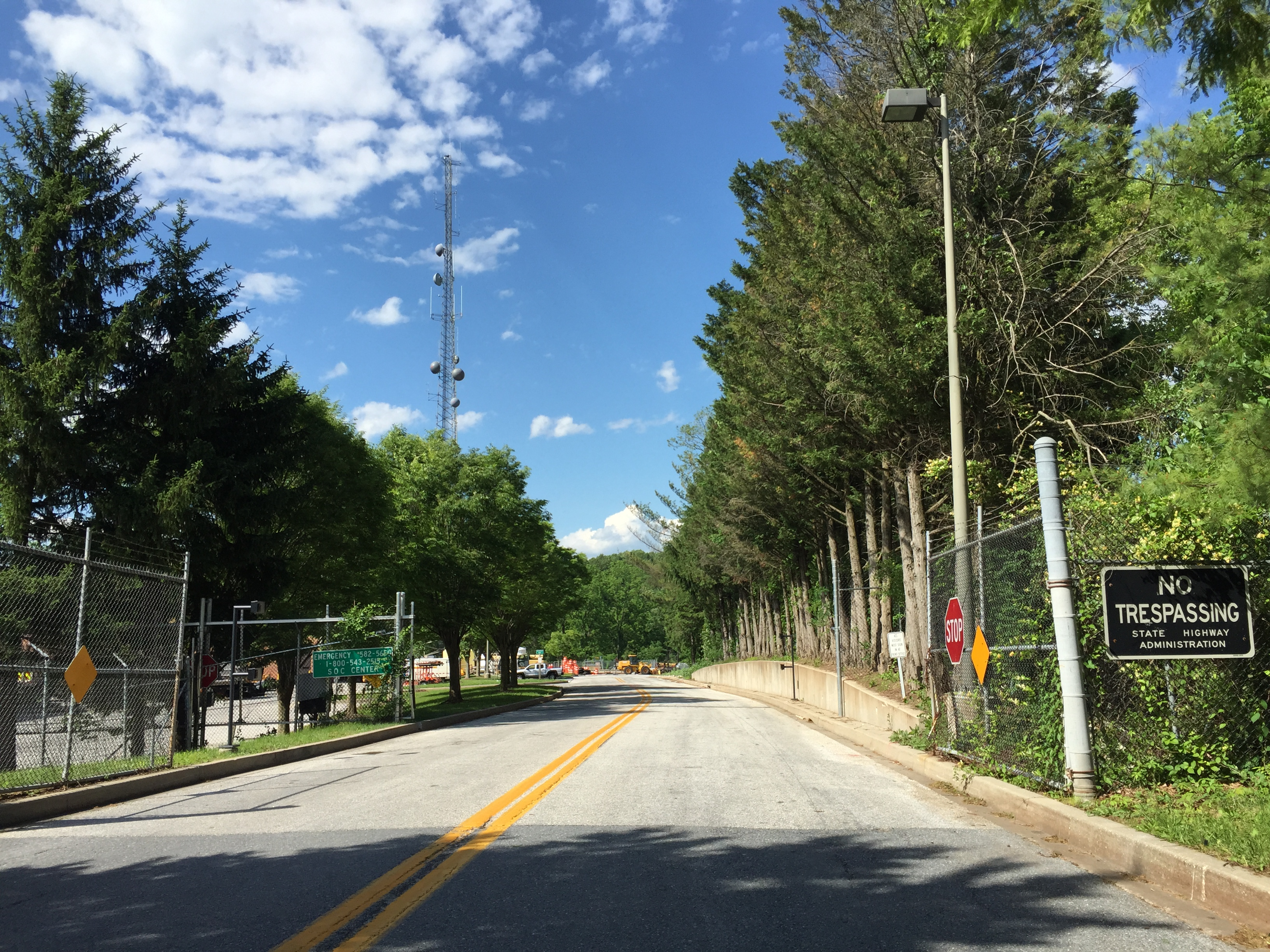
Entrance to the SHA garage at the north end of MD 889 in Hereford

Maryland Route 889 is the unsigned designation for an unnamed road running from a dead end near a SHA garage south to MD 137 in Hereford, Baltimore County. The route is 0.10 mi (0.16 km) long.

Browse numbered routes
← MD 879	→ MD 894

== MD 894 ==
Maryland Route 894
- Location: Hancock
- Length: 0.10 mi (160 m)

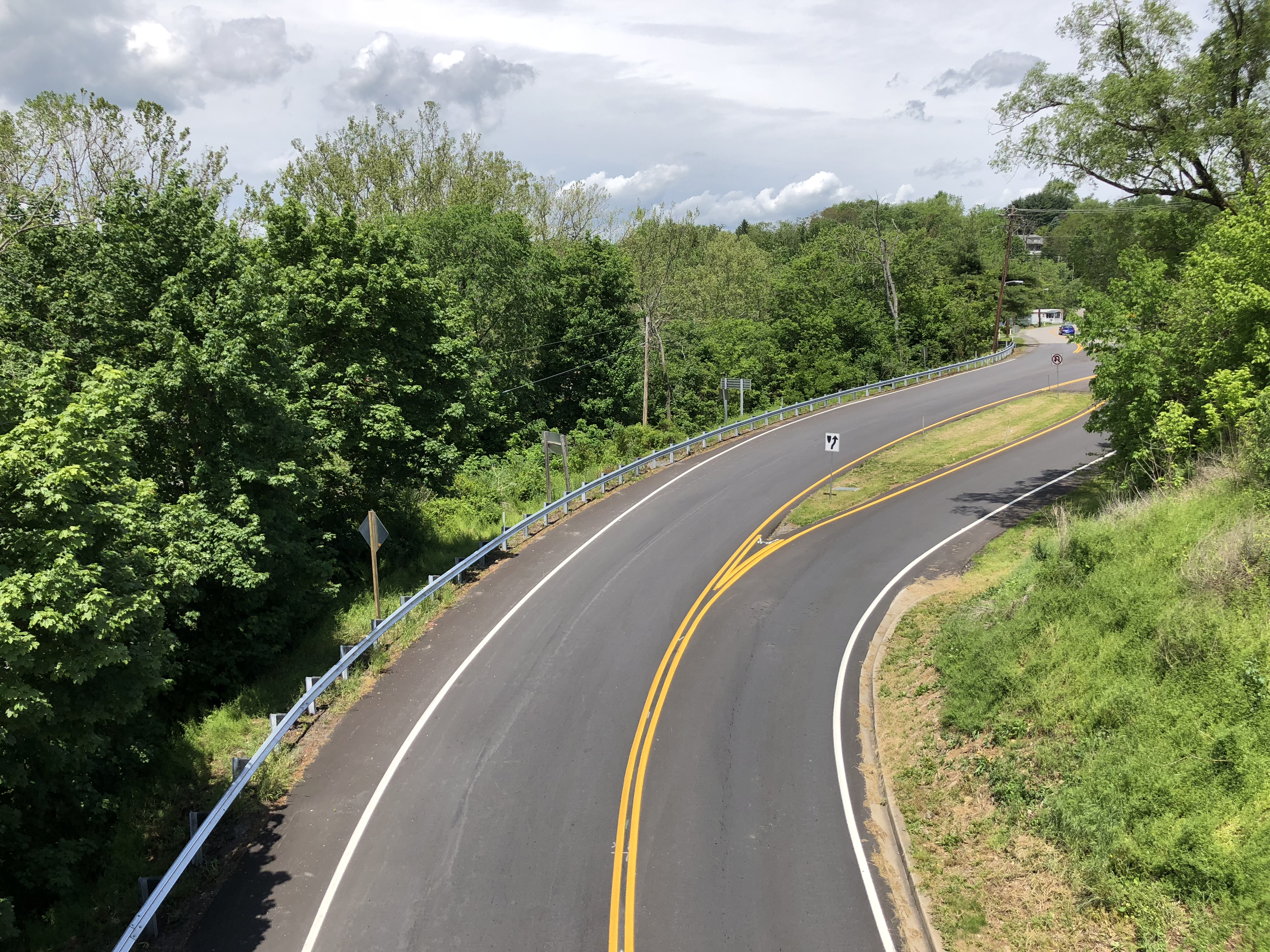
View north along MD 894 from US 522 in Hancock

Maryland Route 894 is the designation for Limestone Road, a 0.10-mile (0.16 km) section of old alignment of US 522 from MD 144 north to a ramp from southbound US 522 in Hancock.

Browse numbered routes
← MD 889	→ I-895

== MD 896 ==
Maryland Route 896
- Location: Northeastern Cecil County
- Length: 0.21 mi (340 m)
- Existed: c. 1946–

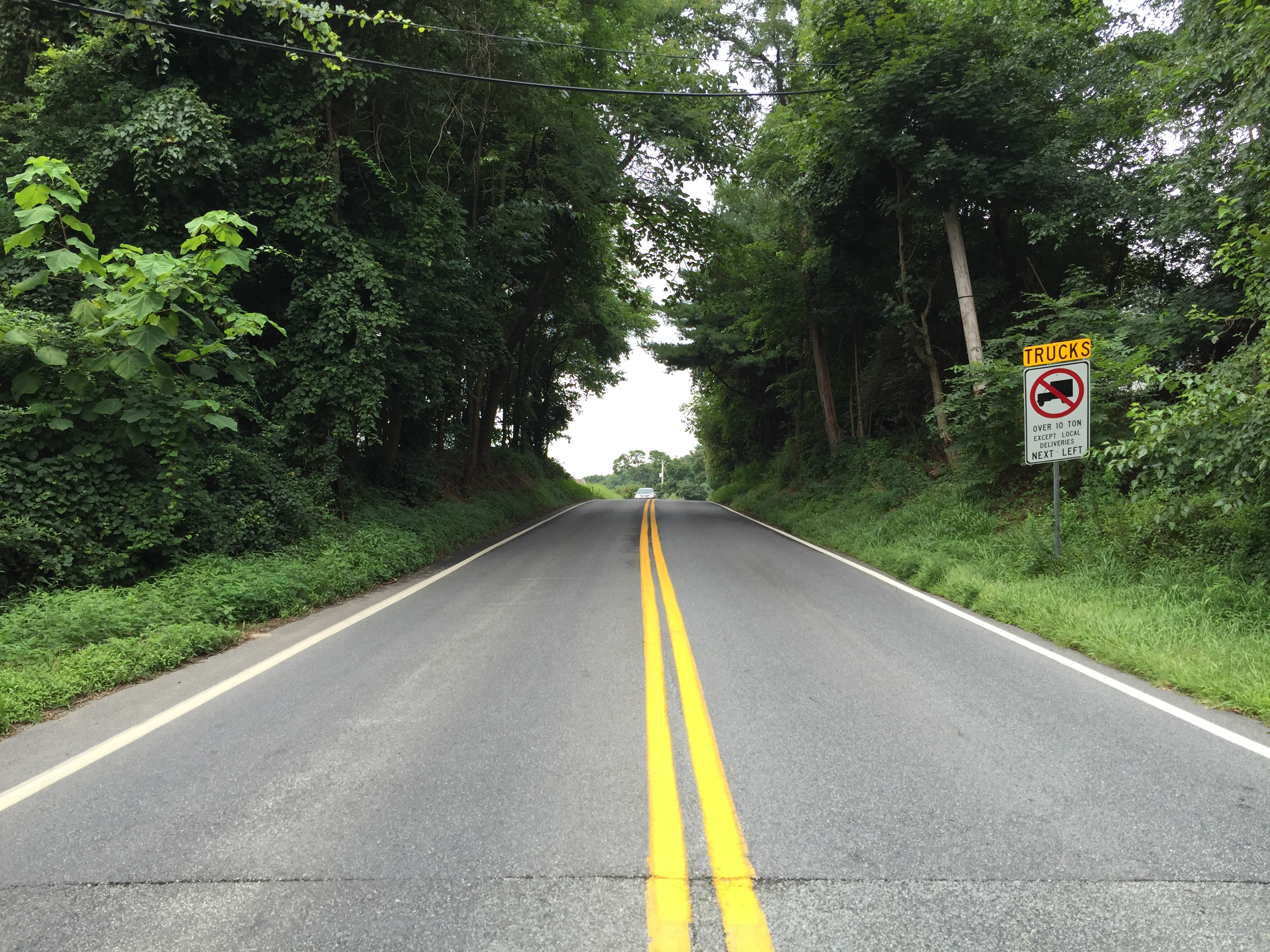
View north at the south end of MD 896 at DE 896 at the Delaware border in northeastern Cecil County

Maryland Route 896, which is known as Mechanicsville Road, runs 0.21 miles (0.34 km) from the Delaware state line west and north to the Pennsylvania state line in far northeastern Cecil County. The two-lane highway, whose only intersection is with Little Egypt Road, connects Delaware Route 896, which heads southeast into Newark, with Pennsylvania Route 896, which heads northwest toward Strickersville. The highway was constructed as a 15-foot-wide (4.6 m) concrete road in 1925 as Maryland's very short portion of the highway between Newark and the Lincoln Highway near Lancaster. The state highway was originally designated Maryland Route 278. The Delaware and Pennsylvania routes were numbered 896 by 1938. MD 278's designation was changed to MD 896 between 1940 and 1946.

=== References ===
Browse numbered routes
← I-895	→ MD 899

== MD 899 ==
Maryland Route 899
- Location: Quince Orchard
- Length: 0.17 mi (270 m)

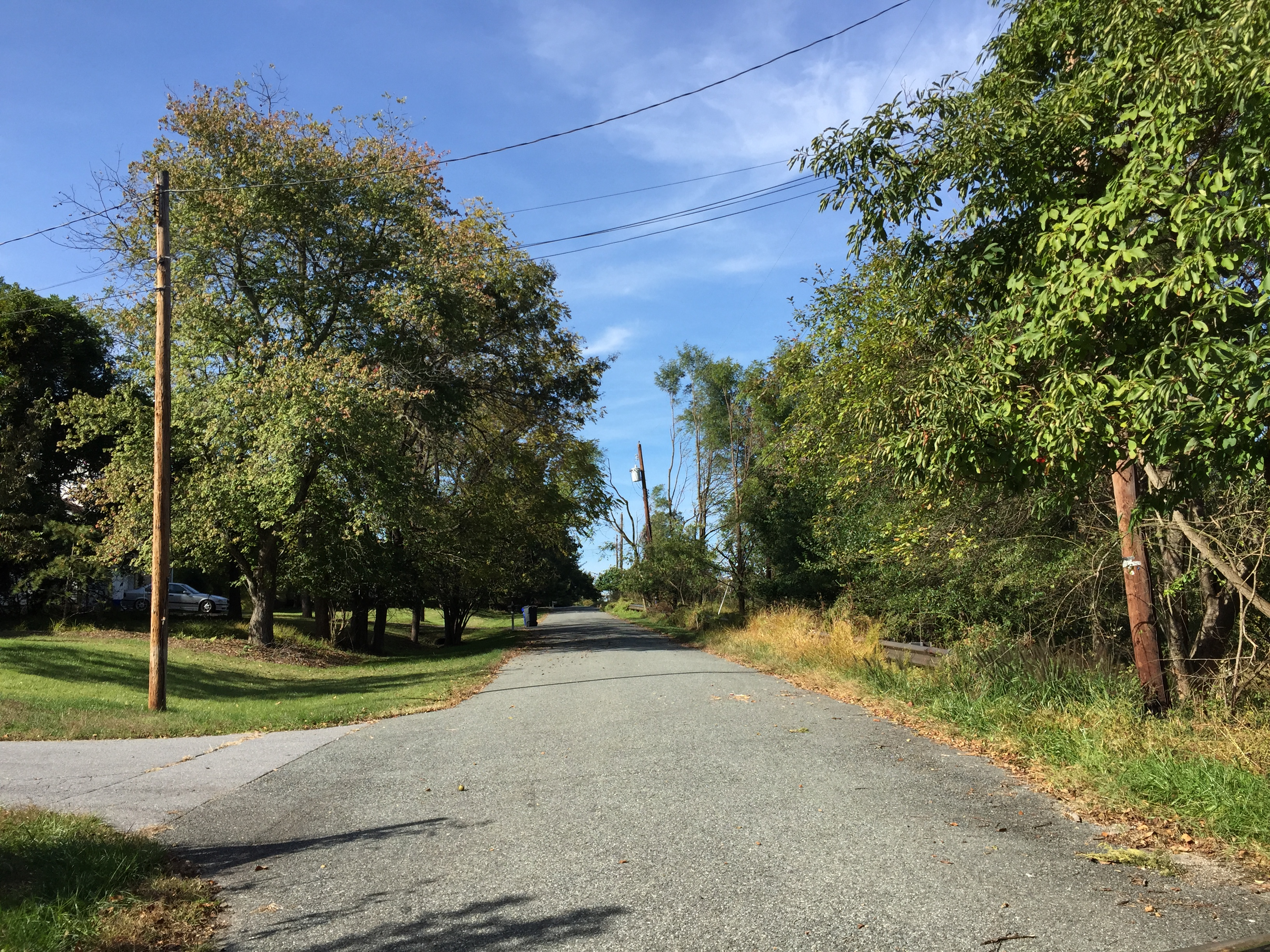
View west along MD 899 in Quince Orchard

Maryland Route 899 is the designation for American Way, a road in Quince Orchard, Montgomery County that runs from its end to Cherry Grove Drive, with ramps to Maryland Route 28 along the way. The route is 0.17 miles (0.27 km) long.

Maryland Route 899A is another section of the American Way, 0.09 miles (0.14 km) long, branching from MD 28 to its end.

Browse numbered routes
← MD 896	→ MD 903
