= National Register of Historic Places listings in Kent County, Maryland =

Location of Kent County in Maryland

This is a list of the National Register of Historic Places listings in Kent County, Maryland.

This is intended to be a complete list of the properties and districts on the National Register of Historic Places in Kent County, Maryland, United States. Latitude and longitude coordinates are provided for many National Register properties and districts; these locations may be seen together in a map.

There are 44 properties and districts listed on the National Register in the county, including 2 National Historic Landmarks.

Contents: Counties in Maryland
Allegany - Anne Arundel - Baltimore (city) - Baltimore County - Calvert - Caroline - Carroll - Cecil - Charles - Dorchester - Frederick - Garrett - Harford - Howard - Kent - Montgomery - Prince George's - Queen Anne's - Somerset - St. Mary's - Talbot - Washington - Wicomico - Worcester

This National Park Service list is complete through NPS recent listings posted July 10, 2026.

== Current listings ==
	Name on the Register	Image	Date listed	Location	City or town	Description
1	Airy Hill	Airy Hill	December 30, 1996 (#96001478)	7909 Airy Hill Rd. 39°11′34″N 76°05′36″W	Chestertown vicinity	
2	BERNICE J. (skipjack)		September 5, 1985 (#85001946)	Town Dock; 39°12′24″N 76°03′48″W	Chestertown	
3	Betterton Historic District	Betterton Historic District	June 7, 1984 (#84001805)	Roughly bounded by the Sassafras River, Gut Marsh, 6th, and Ericsson Aves. 39°22′02″N 76°03′47″W	Betterton	
4	Brampton	Brampton	August 4, 1983 (#83002954)	Maryland Route 20; 39°12′43″N 76°05′44″W	Chestertown vicinity	
5	Carvill Hall	Carvill Hall	March 14, 1973 (#73000930)	Great Oak Estates, 10 miles west of Chestertown; 39°15′34″N 76°12′06″W	Chestertown vicinity	
6	Chestertown Armory	Chestertown Armory	September 25, 1985 (#85002668)	Quaker Neck Rd. 39°12′10″N 76°04′06″W	Chestertown	
7	Chestertown Historic District	Chestertown Historic District	April 15, 1970 (#70000263)	Roughly bounded by Maple Avenue, the Chester River, and Cannon and Cross Streets; also High Street, Water Street, Cannon Street, Calvery Street, Mill Street, Kent Street, Spring Avenue, Washington Avenue, Prospect Street, N. College Avenue, Court Street, Philosophers Terrace; 39°12′29″N 76°03′52″W	Chestertown	Second set of addresses represent a boundary increase approved July 13, 2026.
8	Chestertown Railroad Station	Chestertown Railroad Station	December 8, 1982 (#82001597)	Cross St. 39°12′28″N 76°04′08″W	Chestertown	
9	Chesterville Brick House	Chesterville Brick House	July 17, 1979 (#79001139)	Junction of Maryland Routes 290 and 444; 39°16′36″N 75°54′57″W	Chesterville	
10	Christ Church, Graveyard and Sexton's House	Christ Church, Graveyard and Sexton's House	April 2, 1980 (#80001822)	North of Worton on Maryland Route 298; 39°17′26″N 76°05′32″W	Worton	
11	Clark's Conveniency	Clark's Conveniency	September 9, 1975 (#75000906)	2 miles south of Pomona on Quaker Neck Rd. 39°08′27″N 76°07′18″W	Pomona	
12	Delaware Boundary Markers		February 18, 1975 (#75002101)	Boundary line dividing Delaware from Maryland and Pennsylvania	Multiple	Extends into Delaware and southeastern Pennsylvania.
13	Denton House	Denton House	March 11, 1971 (#71000377)	107 Water St. 39°12′29″N 76°03′47″W	Chestertown	
14	ELSWORTH	ELSWORTH	May 16, 1985 (#85001088)	Gibsontown Rd. 38°42′46″N 76°19′53″W	Tilghman	
15	Fairlee Manor Camp House	Fairlee Manor Camp House	April 11, 1973 (#73000931)	1.5 miles west of Fairlee off Maryland Route 445; 39°14′33″N 76°12′12″W	Fairlee	
16	Gobbler Hill	Gobbler Hill	December 23, 2009 (#09001149)	10121 Fairlee Rd. 39°14′33″N 76°12′12″W	Chestertown vicinity	
17	Godlington Manor	Godlington Manor	February 11, 1972 (#72000583)	Wilkins Lane; 39°10′42″N 76°03′27″W	Chestertown vicinity	
18	George Harper Store	George Harper Store	July 9, 1982 (#82002816)	Maryland Route 292 and Main St. 39°19′38″N 76°02′41″W	Still Pond	
19	Hebron	Hebron	September 18, 1978 (#78001471)	Southeast of Still Pond off Maryland Route 292; 39°19′23″N 76°02′24″W	Still Pond	
20	Hinchingham	Hinchingham	September 5, 1975 (#75000907)	North of Rock Hall off Maryland Route 445; 39°11′40″N 76°14′56″W	Rock Hall vicinity	
21	Hopeful Unity	Hopeful Unity	August 18, 2015 (#15000526)	25789 Lambs Meadow Rd. 39°17′38″N 76°04′29″W	Worton	
22	ISLAND IMAGE (log canoe)		September 18, 1985 (#85002248)	Walnut Point Rd. 39°10′11″N 76°03′46″W	Chestertown vicinity	
23	Knocks Folly	Knocks Folly	June 17, 1976 (#76001006)	North of Kennedyville on Maryland Route 298; 39°21′06″N 75°59′04″W	Kennedyville	
24	Lauretum	Lauretum	September 4, 1997 (#97000926)	954 High St. 39°13′10″N 76°05′08″W	Chestertown	
25	NELLIE CROCKETT	NELLIE CROCKETT	April 19, 1994 (#94001185)	Sassafras River; 39°21′47″N 75°52′55″W	Georgetown	
26	Piney Grove	Piney Grove	December 8, 2020 (#100005962)	7281 Wilkins Ln. 39°10′39″N 76°04′26″W	Chestertown vicinity	
27	Radcliffe Mill	Radcliffe Mill	December 27, 2006 (#06001165)	860 High St. 39°13′09″N 76°04′49″W	Chestertown	
28	Reward-Tilden's Farm	Reward-Tilden's Farm	May 6, 1976 (#76001004)	South of Chestertown, off Maryland Route 289 on Walnut Point Rd. 39°09′08″N 76°08′39″W	Chestertown vicinity	
29	Rich Hill	Rich Hill	December 15, 1972 (#72000585)	Maryland Route 299; 39°22′07″N 75°48′27″W	Sassafras	
30	Rose Hill	Rose Hill	December 12, 1976 (#76001005)	2 miles north of Chestertown on Maryland Route 213; 39°14′54″N 76°03′48″W	Chestertown vicinity	
31	St. Dennis Roman Catholic Church Complex	St. Dennis Roman Catholic Church Complex	November 13, 2023 (#100009525)	153 North Main Street (SR 213); Jct. of SR 290, Duck Puddle Rd, and Lambson Forest Rd; 39°20′46″N 75°52′44″W	Galena	
32	St. Paul's Church	St. Paul's Church	June 6, 1980 (#80001820)	Sandy Bottom Rd. and Ricaud's Branch-Lankford Rd. 39°11′11″N 76°10′47″W	Fairlee	
33	Shepherd's Delight	Shepherd's Delight	June 17, 1976 (#76001007)	South of Still Pond on Maryland Route 292; 39°17′58″N 76°02′22″W	Still Pond	
34	Shrewsbury Church	Shrewsbury Church	June 4, 1986 (#86001245)	Shrewsbury Ln. 39°19′44″N 75°58′03″W	Kennedyville	
35	SILVER HEEL (log canoe)	SILVER HEEL (log canoe)	September 18, 1985 (#85002249)	Quaker Neck Landing; 39°07′45″N 76°05′50″W	Chestertown vicinity	
36	Still Pond Historic District	Still Pond Historic District	August 26, 2009 (#09000645)	Still Pond Road, Old Still Pond Road, Main Street, Medders Road, Maple Avenue, Trustee Street; 39°19′42″N 76°03′55″W	Still Pond	
37	Charles Sumner Post No. 25, Grand Army of the Republic	Charles Sumner Post No. 25, Grand Army of the Republic	July 6, 2005 (#05000655)	206 S. Queen St. 39°12′24″N 76°04′00″W	Chestertown	
38	Thornton	Thornton	December 23, 2005 (#05001428)	10618 Perkins Hill Rd. 39°16′20″N 76°01′11″W	Chestertown vicinity	
39	Trumpington	Trumpington	November 10, 1980 (#80001821)	South of Rock Hall on Maryland Route 445; 39°03′47″N 76°13′39″W	Rock Hall vicinity	
40	Valley Cottage	Valley Cottage	January 11, 1983 (#83002955)	Princess Stop St. 39°21′37″N 75°52′51″W	Georgetown	
41	Washington College: Middle, East and West Halls	Washington College: Middle, East and West Halls	September 6, 1979 (#79001138)	Washington Ave., Washington College campus 39°13′02″N 76°04′05″W	Chestertown	
42	White House Farm	White House Farm	March 12, 1992 (#92000080)	Maryland Route 213 southwest of its junction with Maryland Route 292; 39°17′00″N 76°01′11″W	Chestertown vicinity	
43	Widehall	Widehall	October 31, 1972 (#72000584)	101 Water St. 39°12′27″N 76°03′50″W	Chestertown	
44	Woodland Hall	Woodland Hall	December 10, 2008 (#07001287)	13111 Shallcross Wharf Road; 39°20′02″N 75°56′19″W	Kennedyville	

== See also ==
- List of National Historic Landmarks in Maryland
- National Register of Historic Places listings in Maryland
