= Maryland Route 289 =

State highway in Maryland, United States

Maryland Route 289
- Maryland Route 289 highlighted in red

Route information
- Maintained by MDSHA
- Length: 8.83 mi (14.21 km)
- Existed: 1927–present
- Tourist routes: Chesapeake Country Scenic Byway

Major junctions
- South end: Lands End Road/Cliffs City Road near Cliffs City
- North end: MD 213 in Chestertown

Location
- Country: United States
- State: Maryland
- Counties: Kent

Highway system
- Maryland highway system; Interstate; US; State; Scenic Byways
← MD 288	→ MD 290

Maryland Route 289 (MD 289) is a state highway in the U.S. state of Maryland. Known for most of its length as Quaker Neck Road, the highway runs 8.83 miles (14.21 km) from the junction of Lands End Road and Cliffs City Road near Cliffs City north to MD 213 in Chestertown. MD 289 serves Quaker Neck, a peninsula between Langford Creek and the Chester River southwest of Chestertown in Kent County. The highway was constructed from Chestertown beginning in the early 1920s, reaching Pomona in the mid-1920s and Cliffs City around 1930. MD 289 was widened between Chestertown and Pomona in the early 1950s. The highway's present termini were established, including a change of streets in Chestertown, in the mid-1980s.

== Route description ==
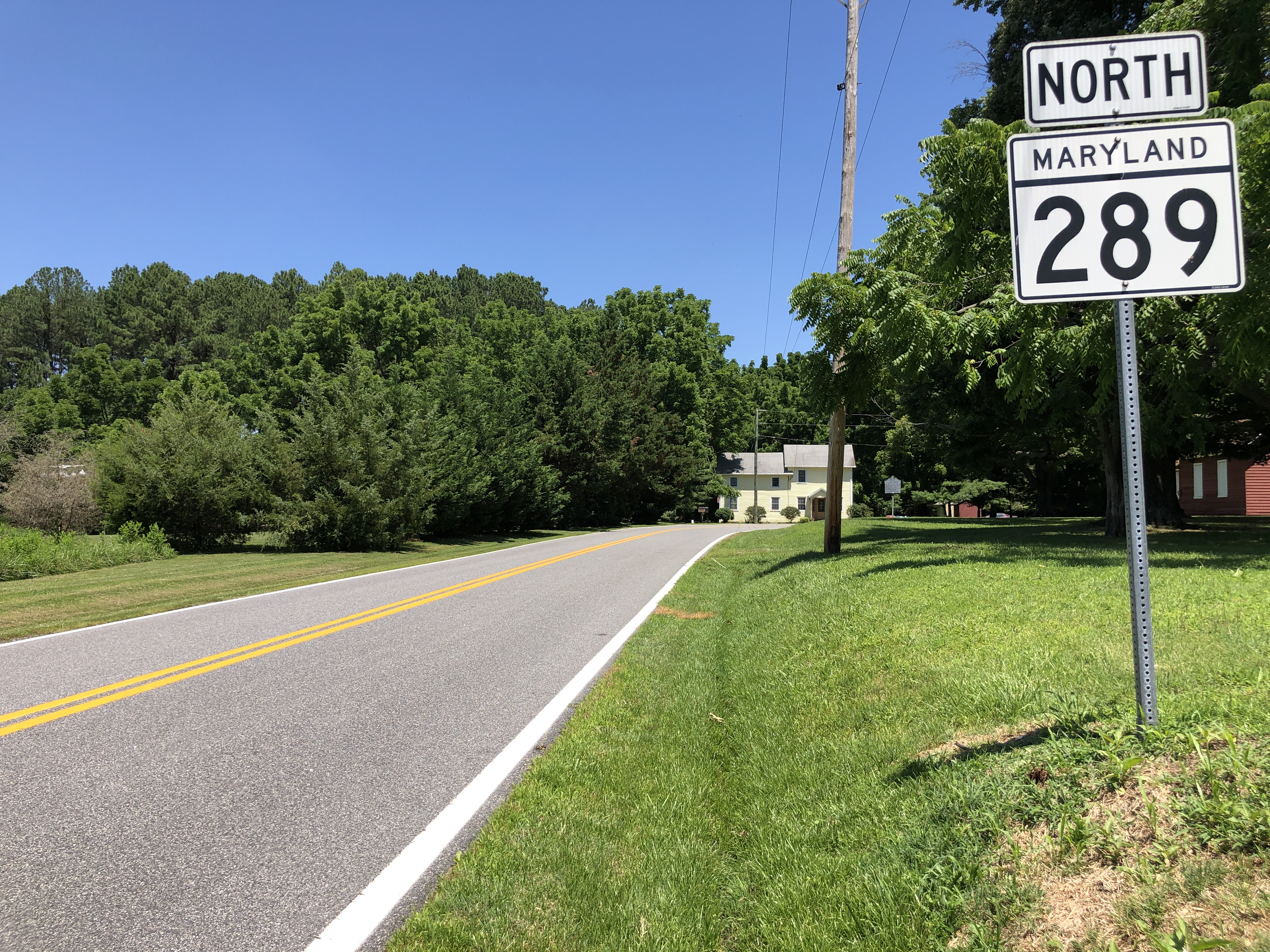
View north along MD 289 in Cliffs City

MD 289 begins at a wye between Lands End Road and Cliffs City Road near Cliffs City, which lies near the southwestern end of Quaker Neck between the Chester River to the south and east and the East Fork Branch of Langford Creek to the north and west. The state highway heads north as two-lane undivided Quaker Neck Road, which immediately has a sharp curve to the east and a more gentle curve to the northeast. MD 289 passes the historic estate Clark's Conveniency before a sharp curve north. The highway passes to the east of Reward-Tilden's Farm and intersects Quaker Neck Landing Road before reaching the village of Pomona, where the highway curves to the east at Pomona Road. MD 289 passes Wilkins Lane, which leads toward Godlington Manor, before curving to the north and passing to the east of Airy Hill.

MD 289 crosses Muddy Creek on the east side of the Chester River Yacht and Country Club before closely paralleling the Chester River. The highway enters the town of Chestertown at Radcliffe Creek. MD 289 passes west of Philip G. Wilmer Park and the Chestertown Armory before the highway makes an S-curve, within which its name changes to Cross Street and it passes east of the southern terminus of the Gilchrest Rail Trail and the Chestertown Railroad Station. The highway continues through the Chestertown Historic District, in the center of which the highway intersects High Street. MD 289 passes the Kent County Courthouse and Chestertown town hall before reaching its northern terminus at MD 213 (Maple Avenue).

== History ==
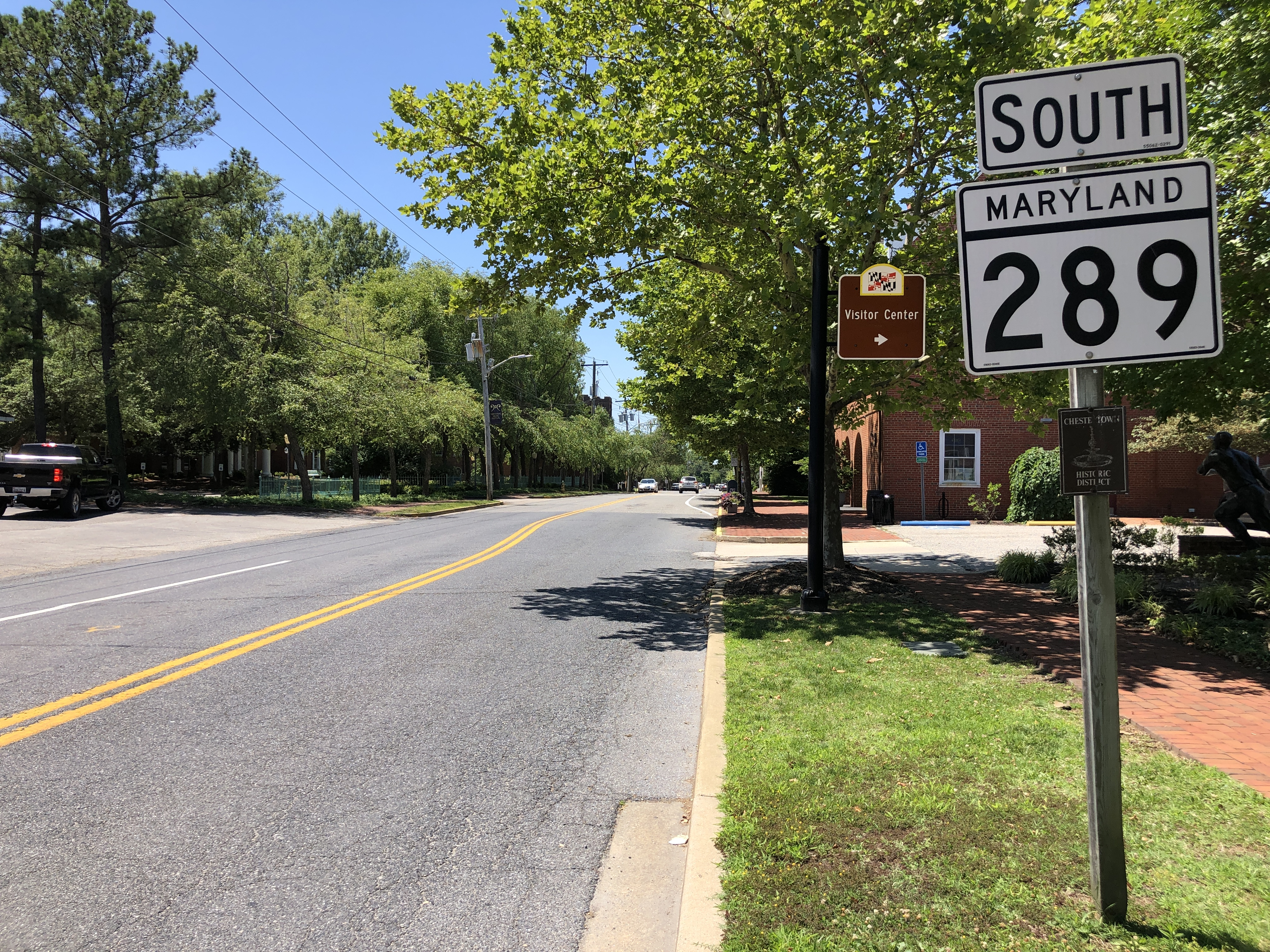
MD 289 southbound past MD 213 in Chestertown

MD 289 was constructed as a concrete road beginning in 1923, when the highway was completed to Wilkins Lane. The highway was extended to Pomona in two sections in 1924 and 1925. In addition, Queen Street in Chestertown was paved from the town limit to High Street. MD 289's concrete was extended from Pomona to near Cliffs City in 1929 and 1930. The highway's steel I-beam bridge across Radcliffe Creek was built in 1948 and 1949. MD 289 was widened to 22 feet (6.7 m) from Quaker Neck Landing Road (then MD 661) to Wilkins Lane (then MD 664) in 1950. The highway was widened to 20 feet (6.1 m) and resurfaced with bituminous concrete from Wilkins Lane to High Street in Chestertown in 1953. All of MD 289 and a 0.60-mile-long (0.97 km) section of Cliffs City Road at MD 289's southern terminus was resurfaced with bituminous concrete in 1968. That resurfaced county-maintained segment was transferred from county to state maintenance through a December 1, 1987, road transfer agreement. In Chestertown, an August 27, 1985, road transfer agreement resulted in the two blocks of Queen Street from the railroad (now the Gilchrest Rail Trail) to High Street being transferred to municipal maintenance and Cross Street from near the railroad to MD 213 being brought into the state highway system. Cross Street from High Street to MD 213 had previously been MD 530 before 1960. The S-curve that connects Quaker Neck Road with Cross Street was constructed in 1986.

== Junction list ==
The entire route is in Kent County.

Location	mi	km	Destinations	Notes
Cliffs City	0.00	0.00	Lands End Road west / Cliffs City Road south	Southern terminus
Chestertown	8.83	14.21	MD 213 (Maple Avenue) – Galena, Church Hill	Northern terminus
1.000 mi = 1.609 km; 1.000 km = 0.621 mi
