= Pomona, Maryland =

Unincorporated community in Maryland, U.S.

Coordinates: 39°9′44″N 76°6′35″W

Pomona is an unincorporated community in Kent County, Maryland, United States. It is located at the intersection of MD-289 (Quaker Neck Road) and Pomona Road, 4.5 miles southwest of Chestertown.

Clark's Conveniency was listed on the National Register of Historic Places in 1975.
