= Denton House (Maryland) =

Historic house in Maryland, United States

- U.S. National Register of Historic Places
- U.S. National Historic Landmark District – Contributing property
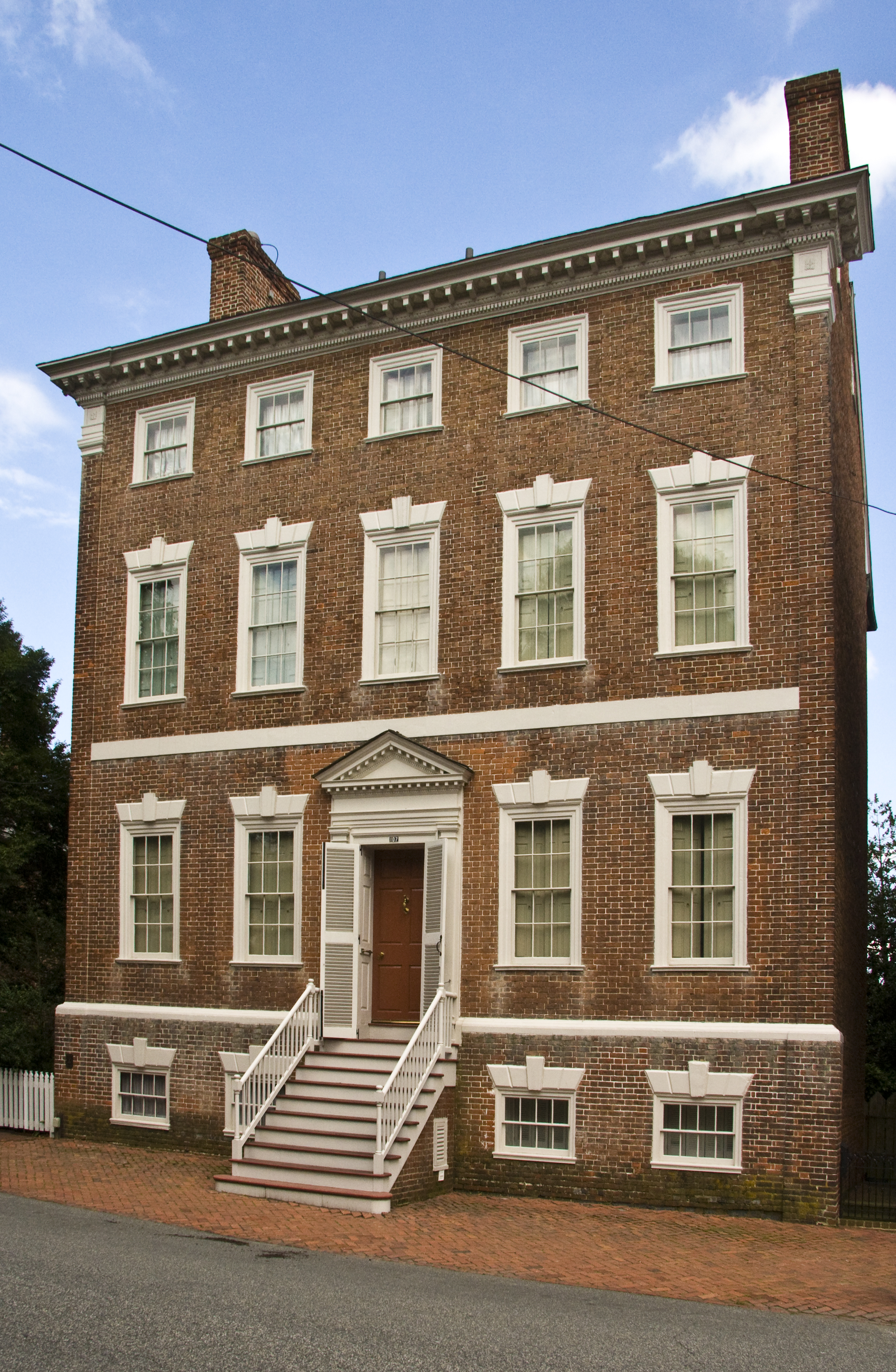

- Location within Maryland Location within the United States
- Location: 107 Water St., Chestertown, Maryland
- Coordinates: 39°12′29″N 76°3′47″W
- Built: 1784
- Part of: Chestertown Historic District (ID70000263)
- NRHP reference No.: 71000377
- Added to NRHP: March 11, 1971

The Denton House, also known as the Denton-Weeks House, the River House, and the Smyth-Letherbury House, is a historic residence at 107 Water Street in Chestertown, Maryland. It is a three-story brick building, with a five-bay front facade framed by corner pilasters with stone capitals. The building has a raised basement, with a stone stringcourse between it and the first floor. The front entrance is centered, with an elaborate surround consisting of pilasters, entablature and dentillated gable. The house was built about 1784 by Richard Smyth, the son of one of the area's wealthiest merchants. In 1791 it was bought by Peregrine Letherbury, the first law professor at Washington College.

The house was listed on the National Register of Historic Places in 1971, and it is a contributing property in the Chestertown Historic District.

== See also ==
- National Register of Historic Places listings in Kent County, Maryland
