= Chester Hall =

Historic house in Maryland, US

- U.S. National Register of Historic Places
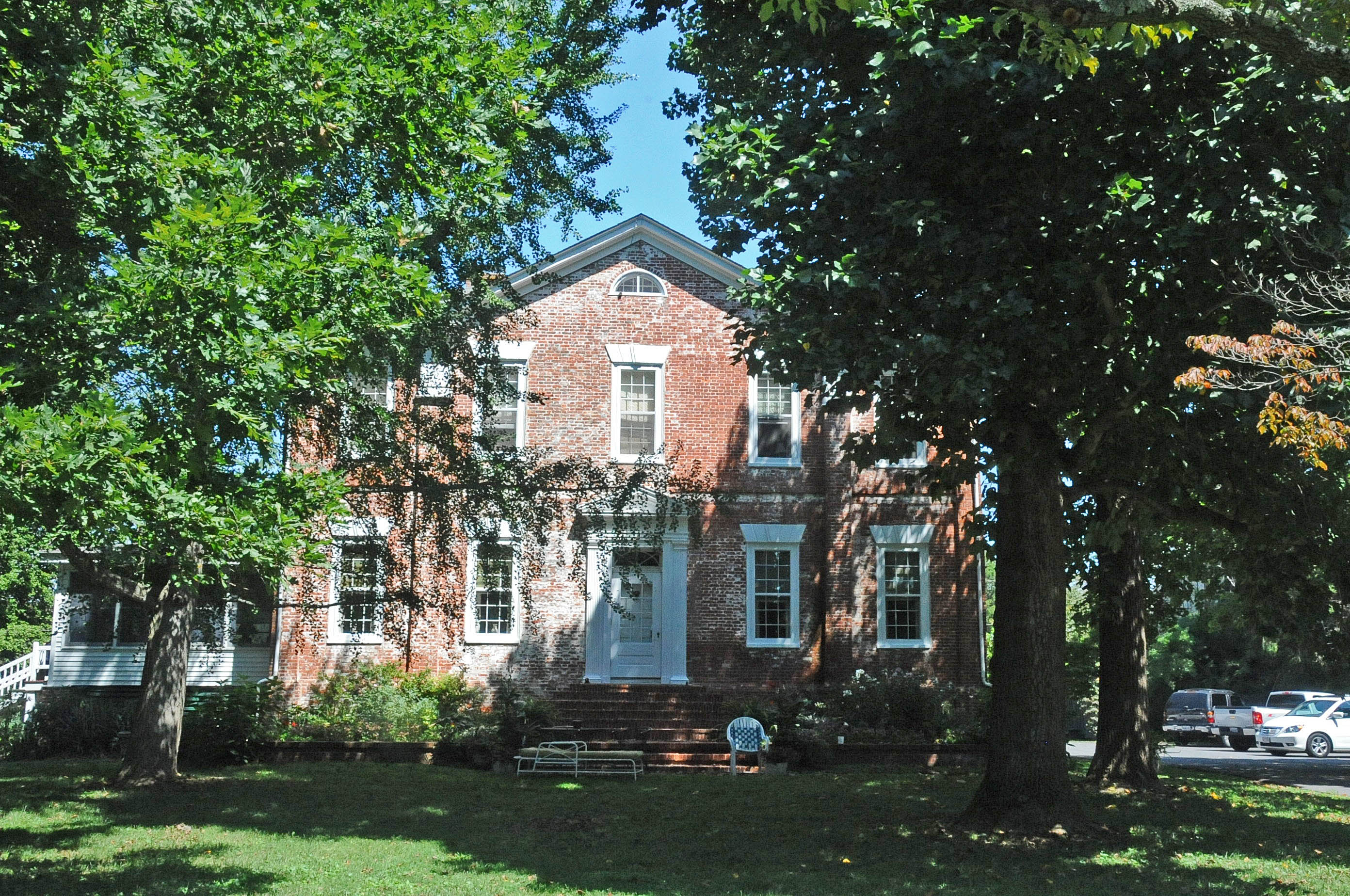

- Location within Maryland Location within the United States
- Location: Round Top Road & Church Hill Road (MD 213), Chestertown, Maryland
- Coordinates: 39°12′17″N 76°2′43″W
- Area: 64.3 acres (26.0 ha)
- Built: 1790
- Built by: Forman, Joseph; Whittington, Thomas
- Architectural style: Georgian, Federal
- NRHP reference No.: 80001831
- Added to NRHP: January 18, 1980

Chester Hall, also known as Rye Hall, is a historic home located at Chestertown, Queen Anne's County, Maryland, United States. It is a large brick Georgian / Federal style Flemish bond brick dwelling constructed in the 1790s. The house measures approximately 48 feet by 36 feet and is two stories tall above a high basement.

Chester Hall was listed on the National Register of Historic Places in 1980.
