= Radcliffe Mill =

- U.S. National Register of Historic Places
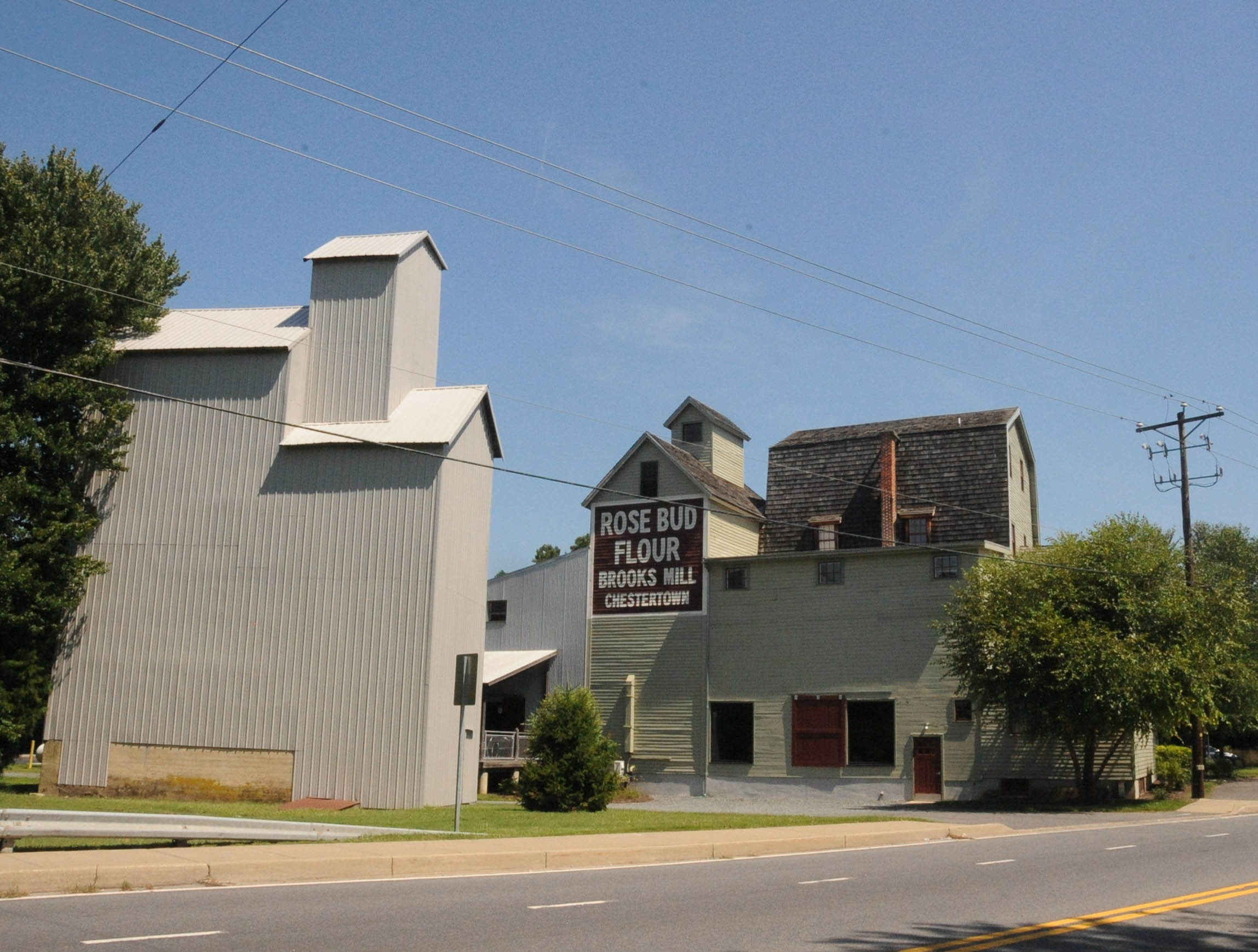

- Location within Maryland Location within the United States
- Location: 860 High St., Chestertown, Maryland
- Coordinates: 39°13′9″N 76°4′49″W
- Built: 1891
- NRHP reference No.: 06001165
- Added to NRHP: December 27, 2006

The Radcliffe Mill is a historic grist mill and related structures located in Chestertown, Kent County, Maryland, United States. It consists of a Mill Building, built in 1891; Grain Elevator, probably constructed around 1924; and Annex / Seed House. The complex is historically significant for its association with the development of agriculture and the associated grist milling industry in Kent County. The present complex occupies land along Radcliffe Creek that has been associated with milling for about 300 years. A mill operated in this approximate location from 1694 until 1997.

The Radcliffe Mill was listed on the National Register of Historic Places in 2006.
