= Bernice J. =

Chesapeake Bay skipjack

History
- Builder: W. Thomas Young
- Launched: 1904

General characteristics
- Tonnage: 8 gross register tons (GRT)
- Length: 58 ft (18 m) LOA
- Beam: 15 ft (4.6 m)
- Depth: 3.3 ft (1.0 m)
- Bernice J. (skipjack)
- U.S. National Register of Historic Places
- Location within Maryland
- Location: Town Dock, Chestertown, Maryland
- Coordinates: 39°12′24″N 76°3′48″W
- Built: 1904
- Architect: Young, W. Thomas
- Architectural style: Skipjack
- MPS: Chesapeake Bay Skipjack Fleet TR
- NRHP reference No.: 85001946
- Added to NRHP: 5 September 1985

Bernice J. is a Chesapeake Bay skipjack, built in 1904 in Young's Creek, Virginia, by W. Thomas Young of Parksley, who also built Claude W. Somers. She is a 42-foot-long (13 m) two-sail bateau, or "V"-bottomed deadrise type of centerboard sloop, commonly referred to as a skipjack. She worked dredging oysters through the 1970s. She is located at Chestertown, Kent County, Maryland.

She was listed on the National Register of Historic Places in 1985.
