= Frank B. Hines =

Frank Brown Hines (June 24, 1881 - March 26, 1950) was an American physician and military officer. Hines graduated from the College of Physicians and Surgeons, Baltimore in either 1906 or 1904. In 1917, Hines joined the Maryland National Guard as a first lieutenant. He served in France as part of the 29th Infantry Division during World War I and was promoted to Captain. In 1922, he became as the regimental surgeon and was further promoted to Major and then Lieutenant colonel.
