= Brampton (Chestertown, Maryland) =

Historic house in Maryland

- U.S. National Register of Historic Places
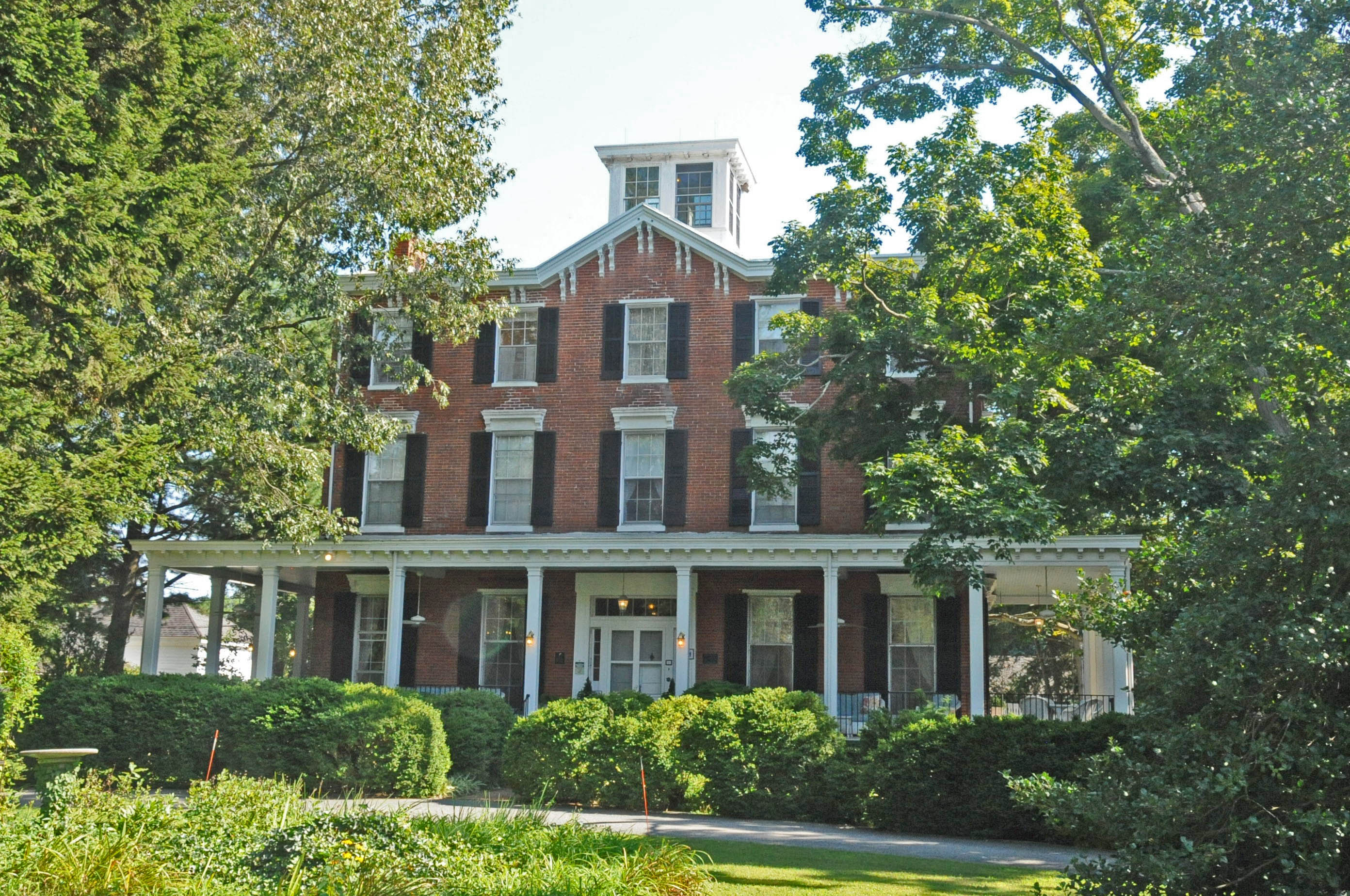

- Location within Maryland Location within the United States
- Nearest city: Chestertown, Maryland
- Coordinates: 39°12′43″N 76°5′44″W
- Built: 1860
- Architectural style: Greek Revival, Italianate
- NRHP reference No.: 83002954
- Added to NRHP: August 04, 1983

Brampton is a historic home located near Chestertown, Kent County, Maryland. It is a transitional Greek Revival / Italianate-influenced dwelling built about 1860. The main section of the house is a three-story structure, constructed of brick with a symmetrical five-bay-wide facade and a depth of two bays. A two-story frame wing extends from the rear.

It was listed on the National Register of Historic Places in 1983.
