= St. Dennis Roman Catholic Church Complex =

- U.S. National Register of Historic Places
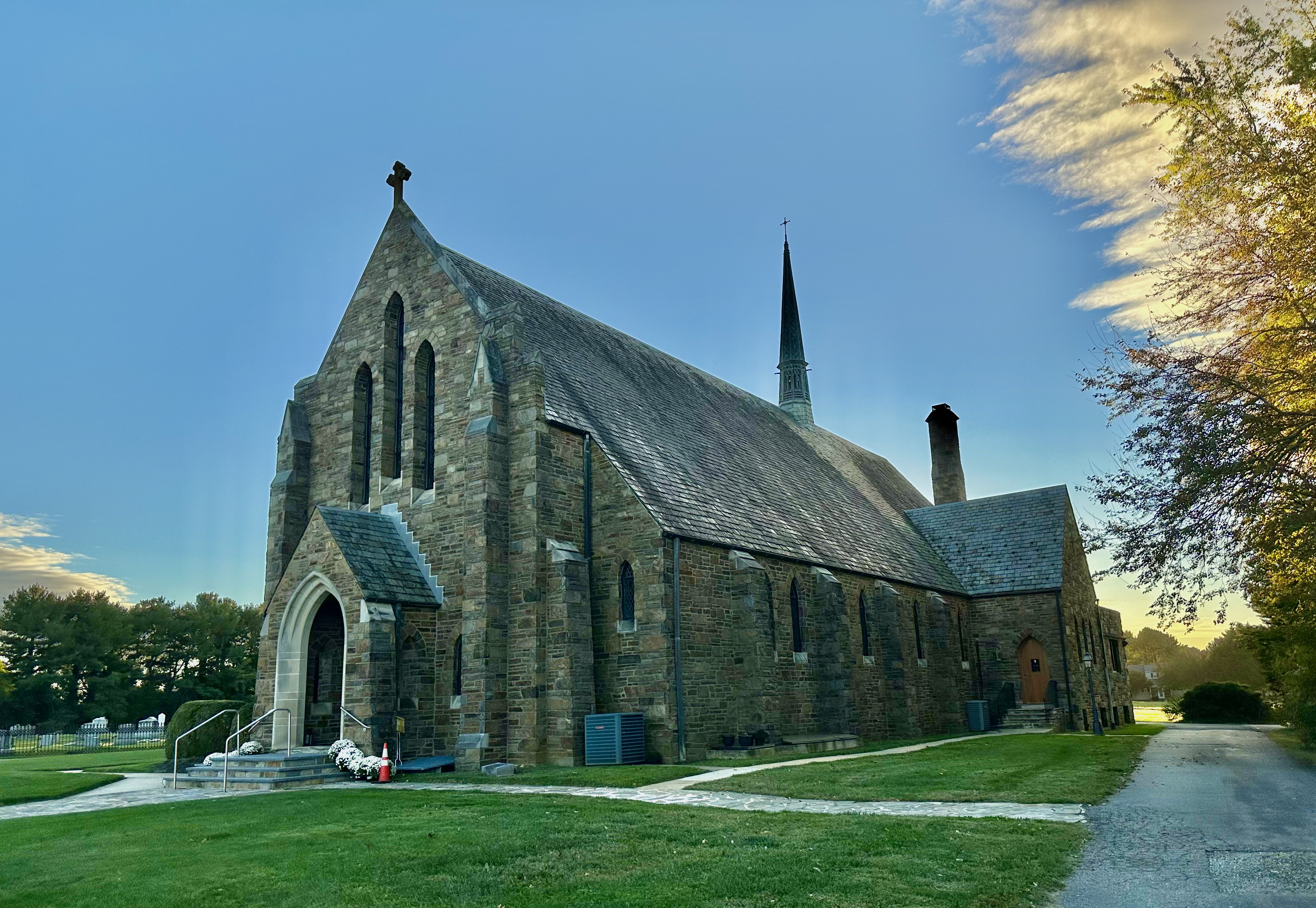
- St. Dennis Roman Catholic Church, October 2025

- Location within Maryland Location within the United States
- Location: 153 North Main Street (SR 213); Jct. of SR 290, Duck Puddle Rd, and Lambson Forest Rd, Galena, Maryland
- Coordinates: 39°20′46″N 75°52′44″W
- Built: 1855-1934
- Built by: Thomas H. Solloway
- Architect: Gleeson and Mulroney
- Architectural style: Gothic Revival
- NRHP reference No.: 100009525
- Added to NRHP: November 13, 2023

St. Dennis Roman Catholic Church Complex is a historic Roman Catholic church complex located at Galena, Kent County, Maryland. The complex includes the church (1934), rectory (1884), and cemetery (ca. 1855). The church is a Gothic Revival-style stone building. The Victorian-style brick rectory is connected to the church by a hyphen.

It was listed on the National Register of Historic Places in 2023.
