= Silver Heel (log canoe) =

- SILVER HEEL (log canoe)
- U.S. National Register of Historic Places
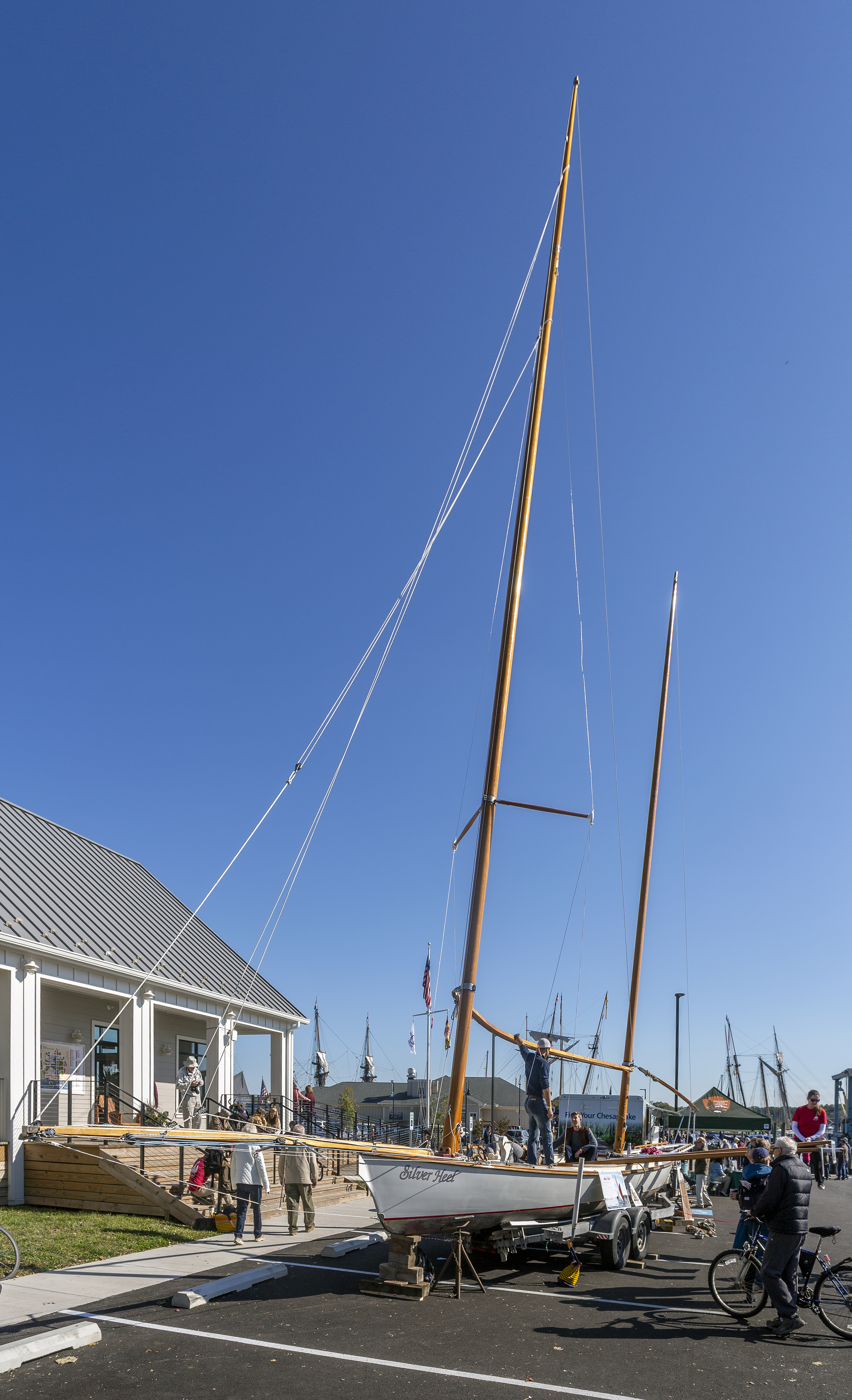
- Silver Heel at Chestertown in 2019

- Location within Maryland Location within the United States
- Nearest city: Chestertown, Maryland
- Coordinates: 39°7′45″N 76°5′50″W
- Built: 1902
- Architect: Thompson, Eugene
- Architectural style: Tilghman
- MPS: Chesapeake Bay Sailing Log Canoe Fleet TR
- NRHP reference No.: 85002249
- Added to NRHP: September 18, 1985

The Silver Heel is a Chesapeake Bay log canoe, built in 1902, in Kent County, Maryland by Eugene Thompson for John Wesley Dickinson. She is a 33'-11 3/4" sailing log canoe in the racing fleet. She has a beam of 7'-3/4". She has a clipper bow, with the longhead braced to serve as a bowsprit, and a straight, raking stern. The canoe is privately owned and races under No. 2. She one of the last 22 surviving traditional Chesapeake Bay racing log canoes that carry on a tradition of racing on the Eastern Shore of Maryland that has existed since the 1840s. She is located near Chestertown, Kent County, Maryland.

She was listed on the National Register of Historic Places in 1985.
