= Lauretum =

Historic house in Maryland, United States

- U.S. National Register of Historic Places
- U.S. Historic district
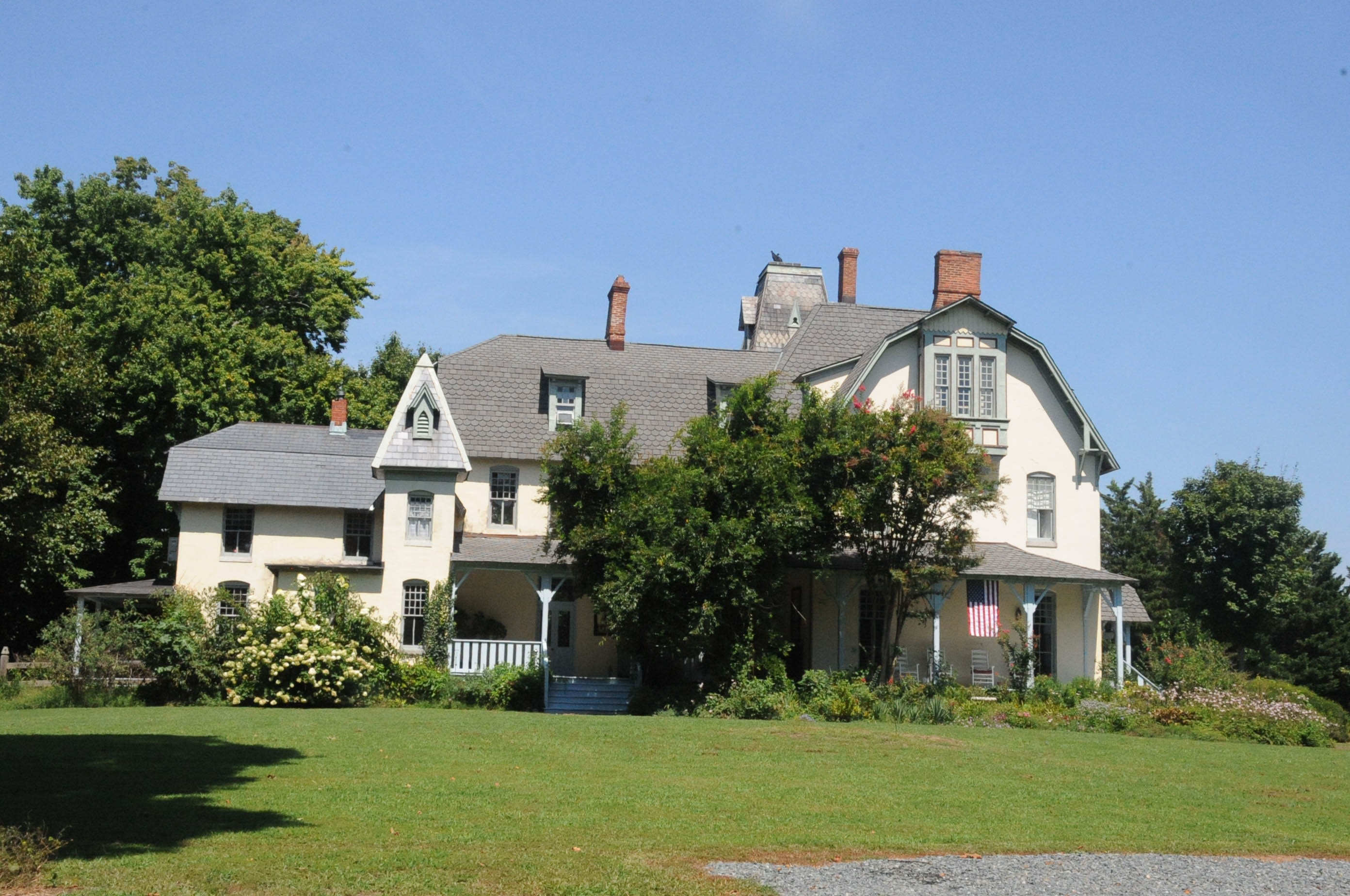

- Location within Maryland Location within the United States
- Nearest city: Chestertown, Maryland
- Coordinates: 39°13′10″N 76°5′8″W
- Built: 1881
- Architect: Lind, Edmund George; Pippin, R.K. & Sons
- Architectural style: Late Victorian
- NRHP reference No.: 97000926
- Added to NRHP: September 04, 1997

Lauretum is a historic home located at Chestertown, Kent County, Maryland, United States. It is a large, three story late Victorian stuccoed frame house built in 1881 for Chestertown lawyer Harrison W. Vickers (1845-1911). Restored by Jennifer Corcoran and Family. It features irregular massing, multiple roof forms, clipped gables, an oriel window, and exposed rafter ends. It was designed by Baltimore architect Edmund G. Lind (1829-1909).

Lauretum was listed on the National Register of Historic Places in 1997.
