= Rose Hill (Chestertown, Maryland) =

Historic house in Maryland, United States

- U.S. National Register of Historic Places
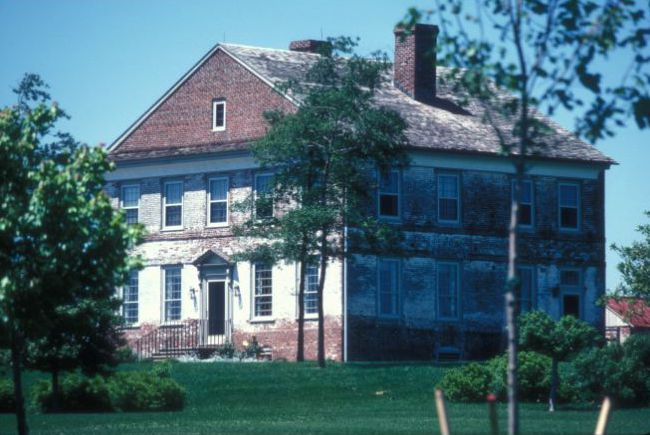

- Location within Maryland Location within the United States
- Nearest city: Chestertown, Maryland
- Coordinates: 39°14′54″N 76°3′48″W
- NRHP reference No.: 76001005
- Added to NRHP: December 12, 1976

Rose Hill is a historic home located near Chestertown, Kent County, Maryland. It is a 40-foot square, two-story brick structure built during the latter half of the 18th century.

It was listed on the National Register of Historic Places in 1976.
