= Island Image =

- ISLAND IMAGE (log canoe)
- U.S. National Register of Historic Places
- Location within Maryland Location within the United States
- Nearest city: Chestertown, Maryland
- Coordinates: 39°10′11″N 76°3′46″W
- Built: 1885
- Architect: Jones, Herman; Moore, Isaac
- Architectural style: Tilghman
- MPS: Chesapeake Bay Sailing Log Canoe Fleet TR
- NRHP reference No.: 85002248
- Added to NRHP: September 18, 1985

The Island Image is a Chesapeake Bay log canoe, built in 1885 at Elliot's Island, Maryland, by Herman Jones and Isaac Moore. It is 29'-8½" long with a beam of 5-10¼", and has a straight, raking stem and a sharp stern. It is privately owned, and races under No. 17. It is one of the last 22 surviving traditional Chesapeake Bay racing log canoes that carry on a tradition of racing on the Eastern Shore of Maryland that has existed since the 1840s. She is located at Chestertown, Kent County, Maryland.

The Island Image was listed on the National Register of Historic Places in 1985.
