= Chestertown Armory =

- U.S. National Register of Historic Places
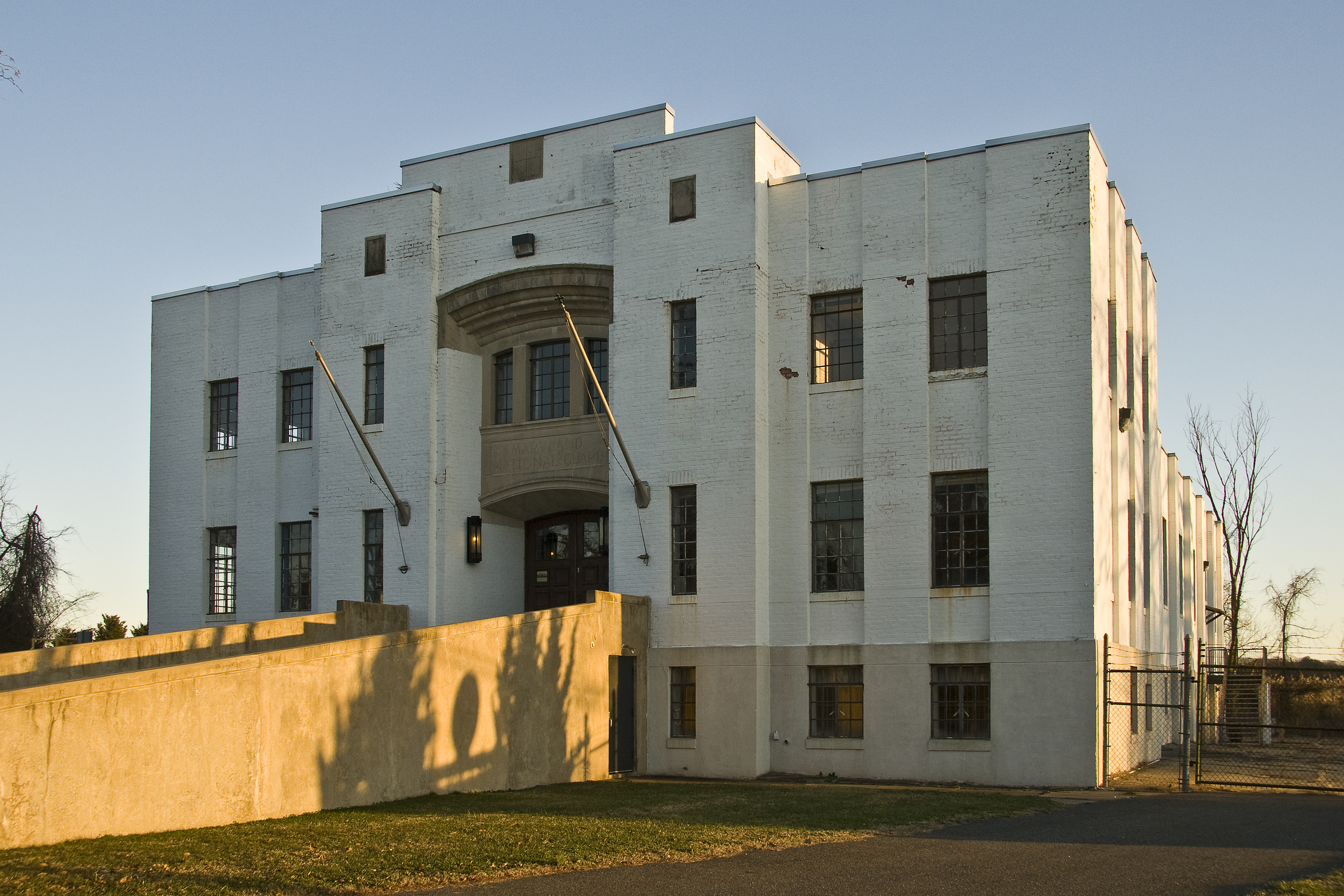
- Chestertown Armory, December 2009

- Location within Maryland Location within the United States
- Coordinates: 39°12′10″N 76°04′06″W
- Built: 1931
- Architectural style: Medieval
- MPS: Maryland National Guard Armories TR
- NRHP reference No.: 85002668
- Added to NRHP: September 25, 1985

The Sergeant First Class John H. Newnam Armory, also known as the Chestertown Armory, is a former National Guard armory built in 1931 and located in Chestertown, Kent County, Maryland, United States. From 1932 until 2005 it housed various formations from the Maryland Army National Guard. It also was the home of sporting and community events.

After the 115th Infantry Regiment was merged into the 175th Infantry Regiment in 2005, the armory was declared to be surplus by the state of Maryland. The building was transferred to Washington College in 2013. In 2024, the Chestertown Historic District Commission approved the college's plan to partly demolish the armory. Chestertown Armory is to be replaced by a hotel and conference center.

== Architecture ==
It is a two-story brick structure with a full basement that emulates a medieval fortification. The front facade features an entryway flanked by simple two-story towers, which are topped by small square stone panels.

== Planning and construction ==
On June 19, 1920, a 22-member "sanitary unit" was recruited in Chestertown, Maryland by Henry A. Mitchel with Frank B. Hines as the commanding officer. A group of local businessmen lobbied Maryland to build an armory to house the unit starting in 1927. Their efforts were fruitful; the Maryland General Assembly appropriated $50,000 (equivalent to $964,000 in 2025) of bond money for the construction of the armory in 1929, and the Maryland Military Department purchased a 3.5 acres (1 ha) lot along the Chester River in 1930.

Construction of the armory did not start in 1930 due to a "delay in securing plans". On August 16, 1931, Maryland announced that Carl Schmidt won the contract to erect the structure with a bid of $47,000 (equivalent to $995,000 in 2025). The contract specified that the building needed to be built of brick and finished in 90 working days. Construction finished in April 1932 with the dedication in May. The ceremony featured speeches from Milton Reckord, Adjutant General of Maryland, D. John Markey, commander of the First Maryland Infantry, and Hines. Afterwards, the unit held an "exhibition drill", a concert and a community dance in their new armory.

== National Guard use ==
From 1932 until 2005, The Chestertown Armory was home to various formations from the Maryland Army National Guard. In addition to its military uses, the armory became a hub for Chestertown and Washington College. From 1934 until the 1950s, it was the home court for the Washington College Men's Basketball team. It also hosted concerts and community events.

The armory was accepted in February 1932, and it became the home of the Chestertown Medical Detachment of the First Maryland Infantry Regiment. They remained stationed at the armory until 1941 when the First Maryland Infantry Regiment and Fifth Maryland Infantry Regiment were merged to create the 115th Infantry Regiment. In 1947, Company G of the 115th Infantry Regiment was raised at armory. It would remain the unit stationed at the armory until 1968 when the 29th Infantry Division was deactivated and the armory was transferred to the 175th Infantry Regiment.

When the 29th Infantry Division was resurrected in 1984, the armory was slated to receive a $500,000 (equivalent to $1,500,000 in 2025) renovation to become the headquarters of the 2nd Battalion of the 115th Infantry Regiment. Instead, it received a 3,700 sq ft (340 m^{2}) addition costing $1 million (equivalent to $3,000,000 in 2025). The next year, The Chestertown Armory was listed on the National Register of Historic Places On August 11, 1999, the building was renamed in honor of John H. Newnam, a Chestertown resident who landed on Omaha Beach on D-Day. Due to consolidation, the armory was closed and declared surplus in 2005 when the 115th Infantry Regiment was merged into the 175th Infantry Regiment.

== Transfer and Washington College ownership ==
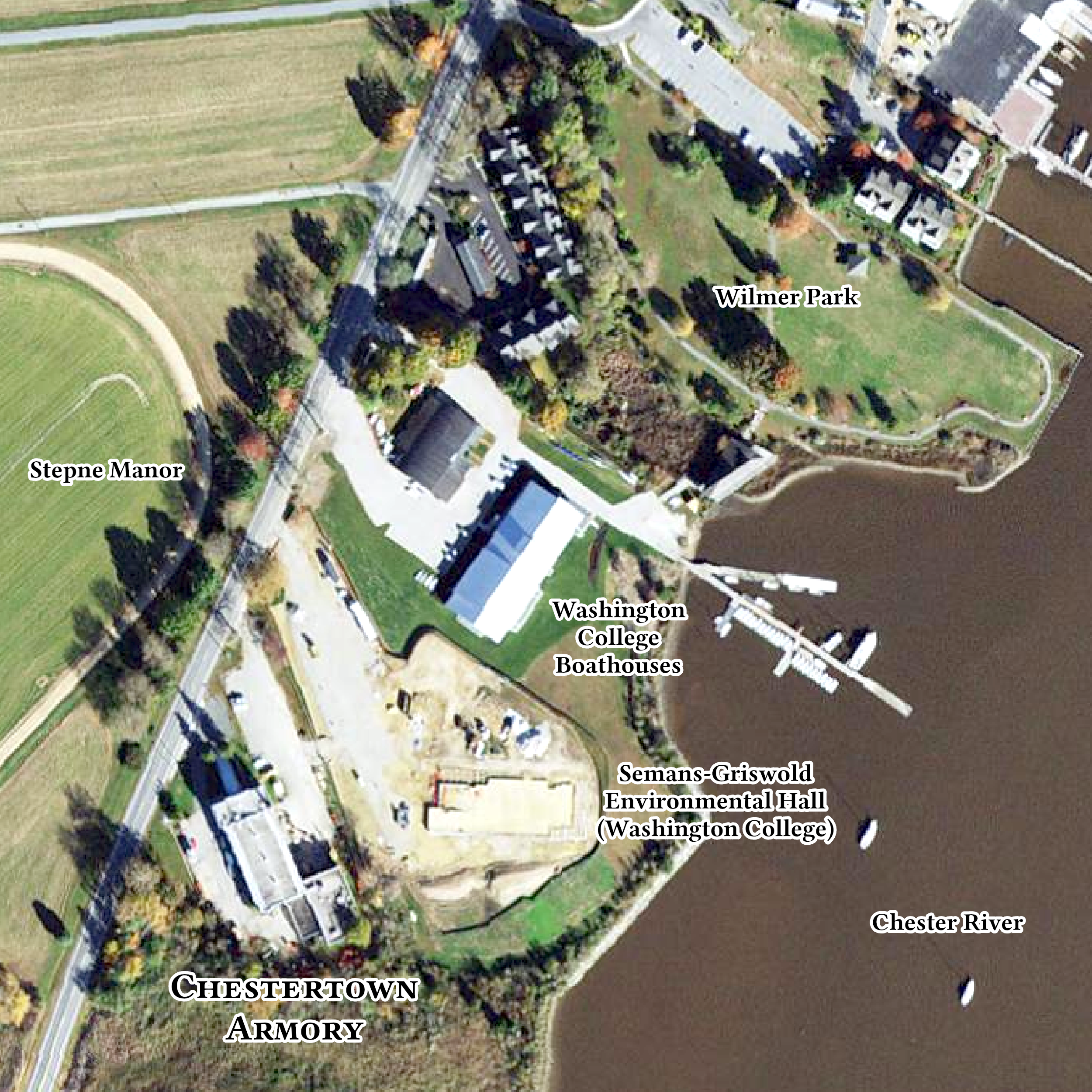
Armory site in 2020

After the departure of the Maryland National Guard from the armory, there was much discussion over what should be done with the building. In 2007, two proposals emerged: one by Washington College and the other by the local homeless shelter. By the end of the year, a consortium of local businesses and the college put forth a proposal to pay the costs of Kent County buying the site.

In 2013, the Chestertown Armory was transferred to Washington College. The structure continues to sit vacant. In 2019, What's Up? Magazine reported that the college was investigating the possibility of turning it into a bed and breakfast.

In 2022, two firms conducted environmental studies of the building showing extensive mold in the building that would make remediation unfeasible. Based on the studies, the college petitioned to demolish the armory and build a hotel and conference center in its place. The Chestertown Council and the Historic District Commission approved the application in October. A month later, permission was revoked because the 25 day public review period was skipped.

Washington College resubmitted their application to partially raise the armory, and it was approved by the Historic District Commission on May 1, 2024. A lawsuit by 3 historic district residents to block the demolition was dismissed on September 5 due to lack of standing. Preservation listed the Chestertown Armory as a "Threatened" in its Winter 2024 issue.
