= Piney Grove (Kent County, Maryland) =

- U.S. National Register of Historic Places
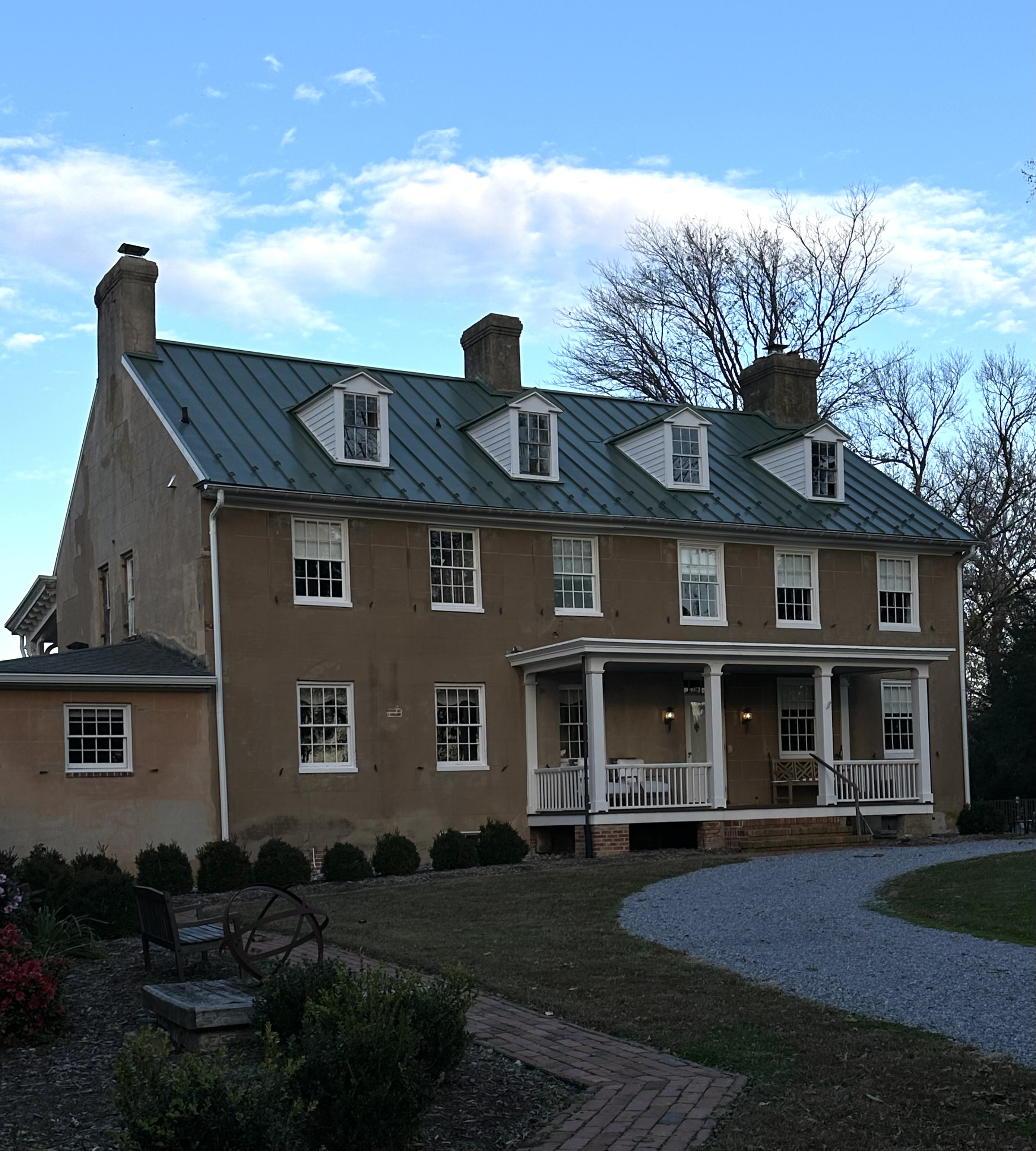
- Piney GroveWest, November 2025

- Location within Maryland Location within the United States
- Location: 7281 Wilkins Ln., Chestertown, Maryland
- Coordinates: 39°10′39″N 76°04′26″W
- Built: ca.1773-1955
- Architectural style: Italianate
- NRHP reference No.: 100005962
- Added to NRHP: December 8, 2020

Piney Grove is a historic home located near Chestertown, Kent County, Maryland. It is a 2 1/2-story, six-bay by two bay, gable-roofed, stuccoed brick dwelling with gabled dormers. The original four-room plan portion was built about 1773, with an equal size Italianate-style addition added in 1864. The house features a full-width giant order portico.

It was listed on the National Register of Historic Places in 2020.
