= Thornton (Chestertown, Maryland) =

Historic house in Maryland, United States

- U.S. National Register of Historic Places
- U.S. Historic district
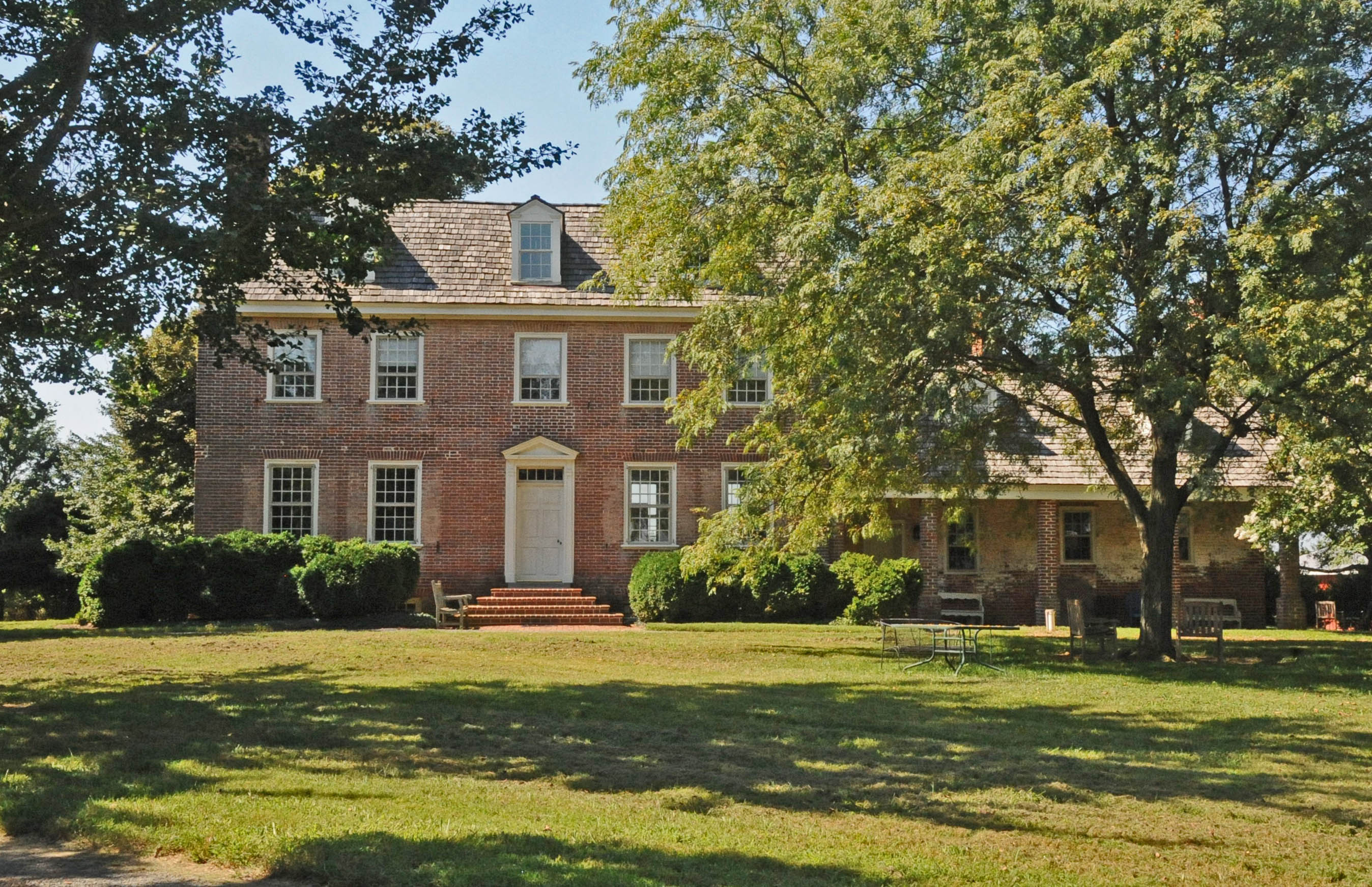

- Location within Maryland Location within the United States
- Nearest city: Chestertown, Maryland
- Coordinates: 39°16′20″N 76°1′11″W
- Built: 1788
- Architectural style: Georgian
- NRHP reference No.: 05001428
- Added to NRHP: December 23, 2005

Thornton is a historic family farm located near Chestertown, Kent County, Maryland, United States. The farm is located on a 352-acre (142 ha) plot on Morgan's Creek, a tributary of the Chester River. The main house is a 2 1/2-story, five-bay brick house, constructed about 1788, and principally Georgian in style. A 1 1/2-story kitchen wing is attached to the west gable end. Also on the property are an early-20th-century dairy barn, a late-19th-century animal barn, a second-half-19th-century granary, a smokehouse, and two sheds. The farm has been owned and operated by the same family for nearly 300 years.

Thornton was listed on the National Register of Historic Places in 2005.
