= Charles Sumner Post No. 25, Grand Army of the Republic =

- U.S. National Register of Historic Places
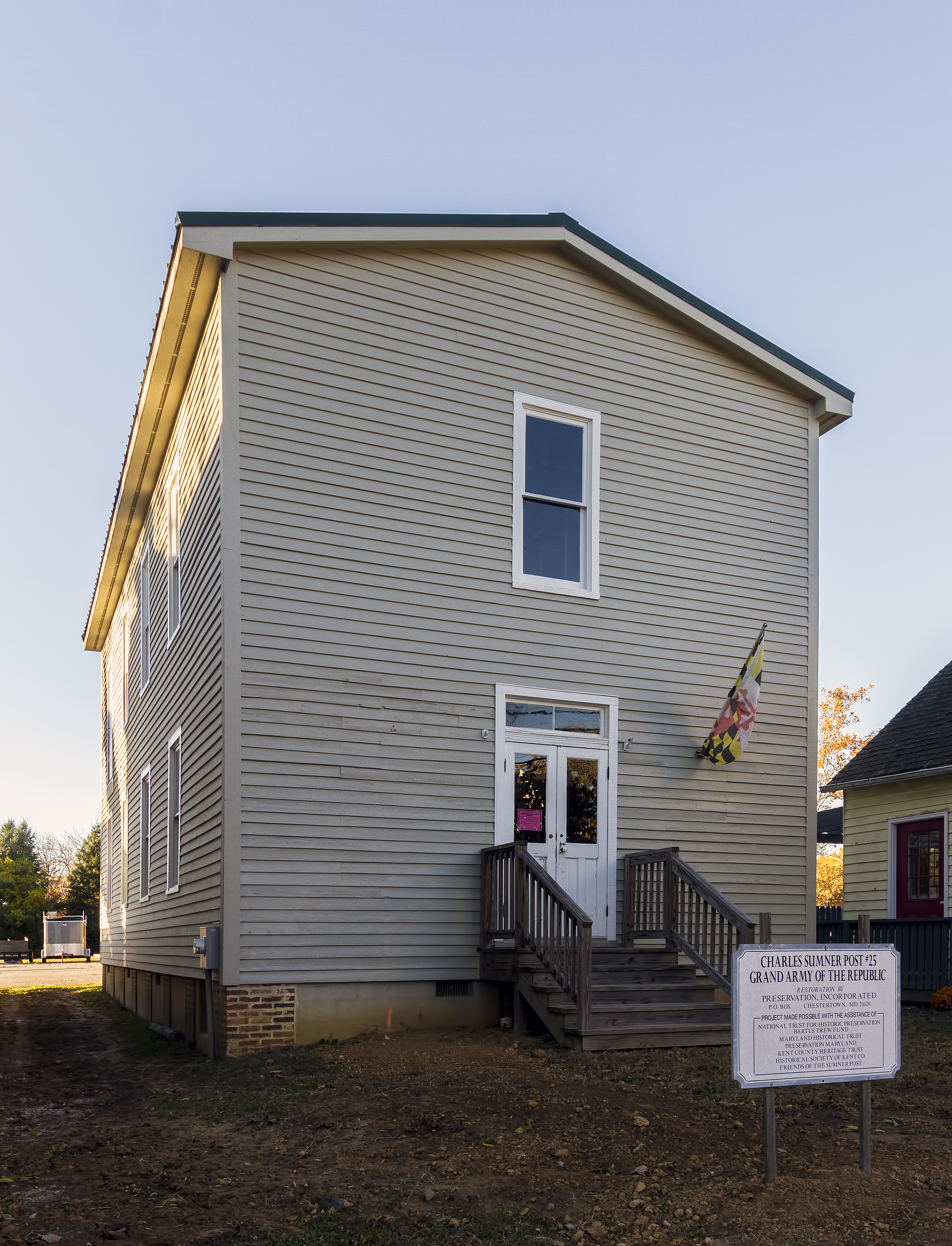
- Restored Charles Sumner Post 25 in 2013

- Location within Maryland Location within the United States
- Location: 206 S. Queen St., Chestertown, Maryland
- Coordinates: 39°12′24.75″N 76°3′54.75″W
- Area: 0.5 acres (0.20 ha)
- Built: 1908
- Architectural style: Front-gabled Wood Frame
- NRHP reference No.: 05000655
- Added to NRHP: July 6, 2005

Charles Sumner Post #25, Grand Army of the Republic is a historic fraternal lodge building located in Chestertown, Kent County, Maryland. Named after Charles Sumner, it was constructed as a meeting hall about 1908 and is a two-story gable-front frame building, built on brick piers, with a rectangular floor plan. It is located in the Scotts Point area, a historically black area within the Chestertown Historic District, and was abandoned between 1985 and 2002. It is one of only two Grand Army of the Republic halls for African-American veterans known to survive in the Nation.

It was listed on the National Register of Historic Places in 2005. In 2012, Preservation Maryland placed the Charles Sumner Post #25 on its list of threatened historic properties.

The building has been restored by the Kent County Arts Council and opened to the public in 2014 as a museum of American Civil War history and the role of African-Americans in the war.
