= Carvill Hall =

Historic house in Maryland, United States

- U.S. National Register of Historic Places
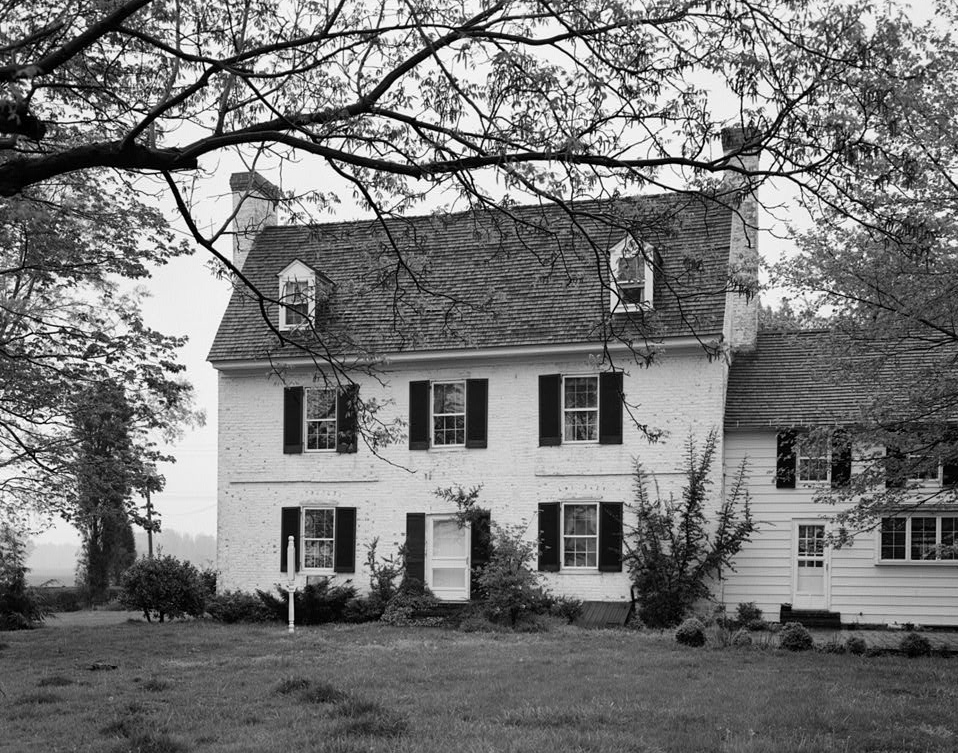
- Carvill Hall in 1973

- Location within Maryland Location within the United States
- Nearest city: Chestertown, Maryland
- Coordinates: 39°15′34″N 76°12′6″W
- Built: 1694–1709
- NRHP reference No.: 73000930
- Added to NRHP: March 14, 1973

Carvill Hall, also known as Carvill's Prevention, Salter's Load. or Packerton, is a historic home located near Chestertown, Kent County, Maryland. It is a 2 1/2-story Flemish bond brick house, with exterior corbeled brick chimneys at each gable end. The main block was built between 1694 and 1709. Additions to the main block date to the 19th century.

It was listed on the National Register of Historic Places in 1973.
