= Gobbler Hill =

Historic house in Maryland, United States

- U.S. National Register of Historic Places
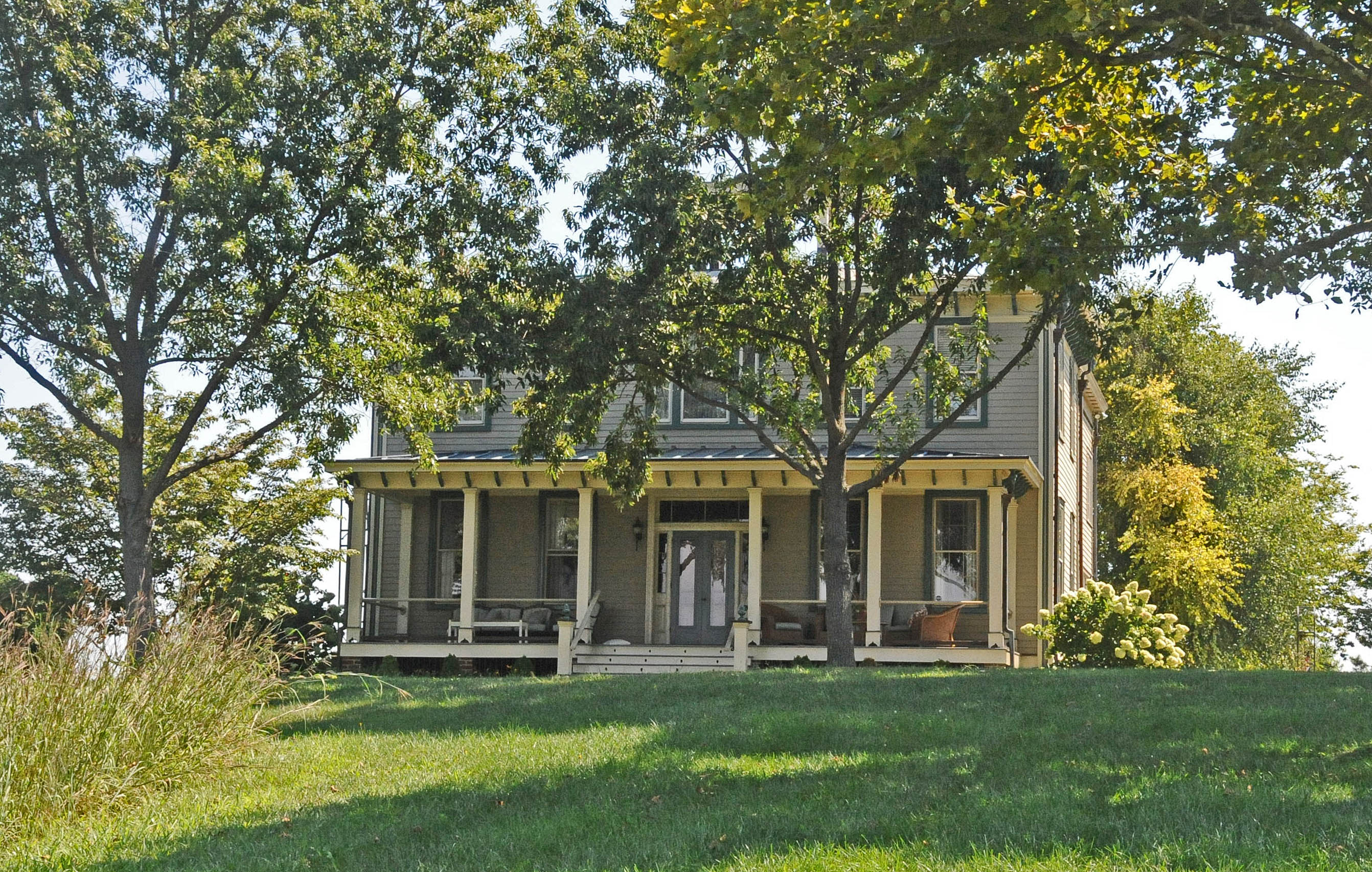

- Location within Maryland Location within the United States
- Nearest city: 10121 Fairlee Rd., Chestertown, Maryland
- Coordinates: 39°14′33″N 76°12′12″W
- Built: 1858
- Architectural style: Greek Revival / Italianate
- NRHP reference No.: 09001149
- Added to NRHP: December 23, 2009

Gobbler Hill is a historic home located near Chestertown in Kent County, Maryland, United States. It was built in 1858 and is a center-hall plan frame house on a foundation of local fieldstone and brick. It is five bays wide, two bays deep, and two stories tall with late Greek Revival / early Italianate style details. It features a shallow hip roof surmounted by a tall belvedere and a full-width porch.

It was listed on the National Register of Historic Places in 2009.
