= White House Farm (Chestertown, Maryland) =

Historic house in Maryland, United States

- U.S. National Register of Historic Places
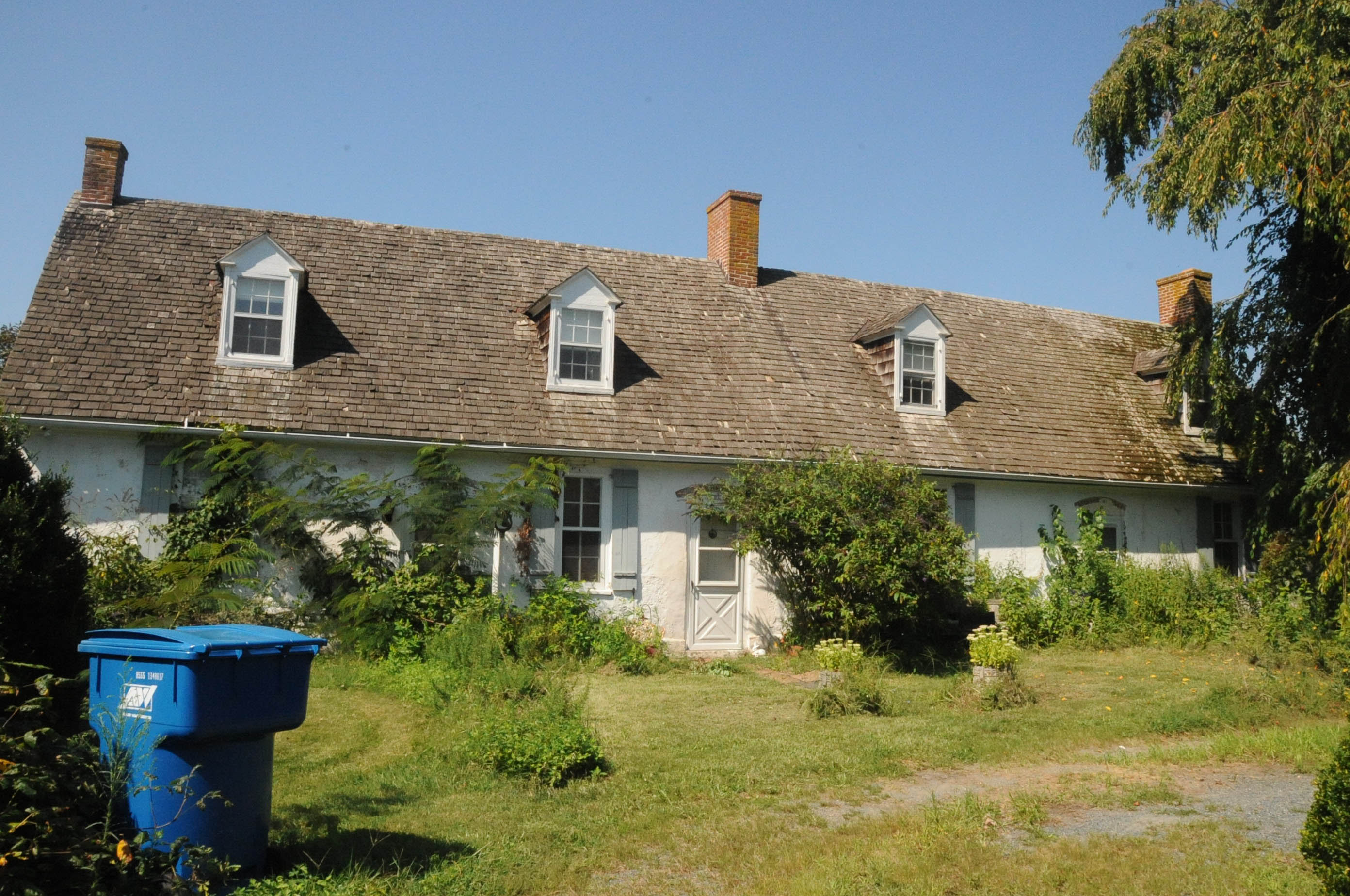

- Location within Maryland Location within the United States
- Nearest city: Chestertown, Maryland
- Coordinates: 39°17′0″N 76°1′11″W
- Built: 1721
- Architectural style: Colonial, Federal
- NRHP reference No.: 92000080
- Added to NRHP: March 12, 1992

White House Farm is a historic home located at Kennedyville, Kent County, Maryland, United States. The oldest section of the 1 1/2-story stuccoed brick house was built in 1721. The house is located on an elevated site, within an informally landscaped yard which retains evidence of historic terracing. Also on the property is a late-19th-century brick dairy.

White House Farm was built in 1721 by Daniel Perkins who was a miller and stone cutter, newly arrived from New Hampshire. He arrived in Kent County in 1710 and obtained the milling rights to dam the West branch of Morgan Creek. Remnants of this dam are still visible from Rt 213. He not only built a small house there with the flour mill but also a sawmill and a fulling mill. After acquiring more property in 1720, he began building the larger brick home up on the hill for his family, overlooking his mills.

The White House Farm was listed on the National Register of Historic Places in 1992.
