= Reward-Tilden's Farm =

Historic house in Maryland, United States

- U.S. National Register of Historic Places
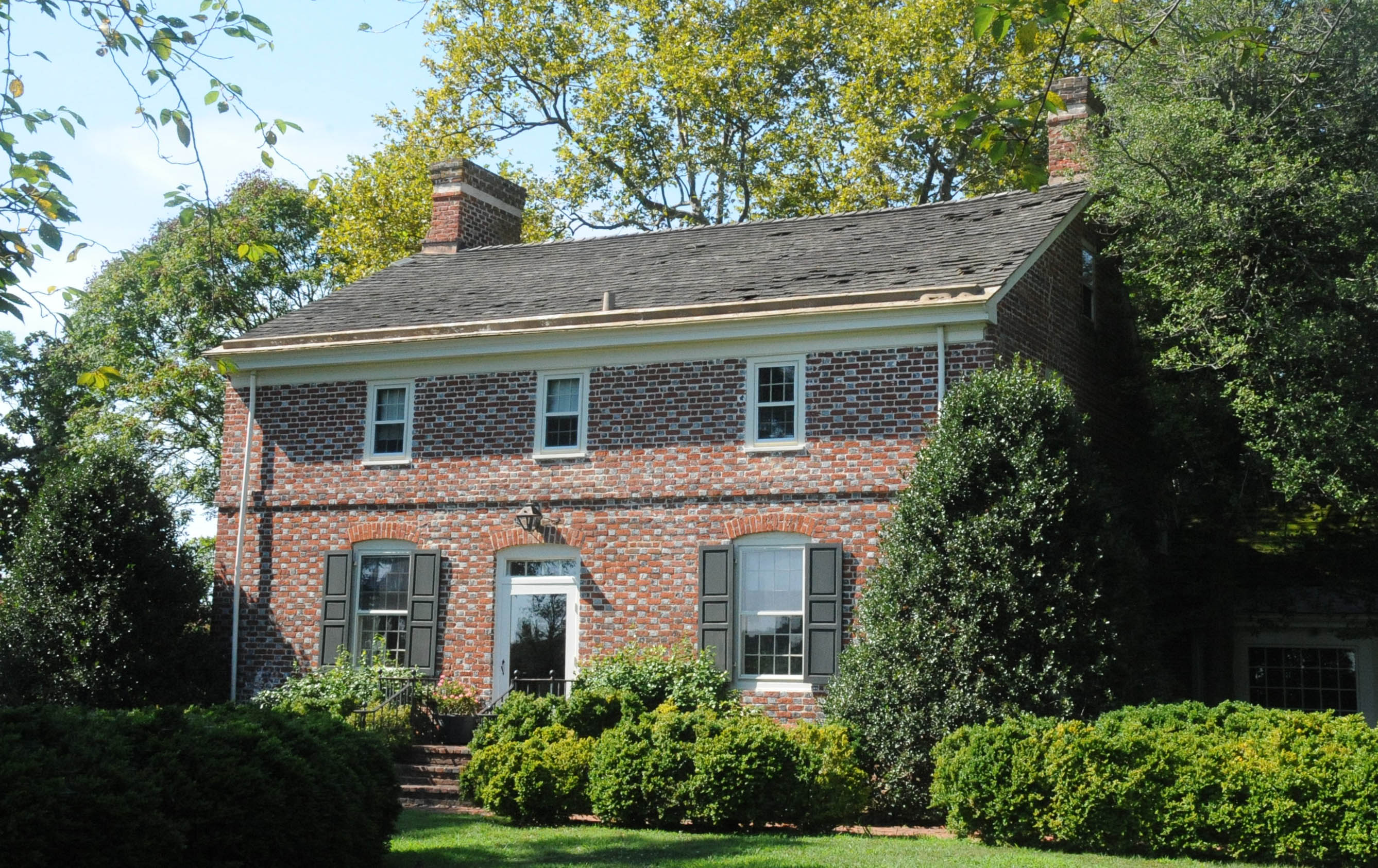

- Location within Maryland Location within the United States
- Nearest city: Chestertown, Maryland
- Coordinates: 39°9′8″N 76°8′39″W
- Built: 1745
- Architect: Tilden, Charles
- NRHP reference No.: 76001004
- Added to NRHP: May 06, 1976

Reward-Tilden's Farm, or The Reward, is a historic home located near Chestertown, Kent County, Maryland. It is a three-bay long, two-bay deep, two-story, brick dwelling which appears to have been constructed in the 1740s.

It was listed on the National Register of Historic Places in 1977.
