= Airy Hill =

Historic house in Maryland

- U.S. National Register of Historic Places
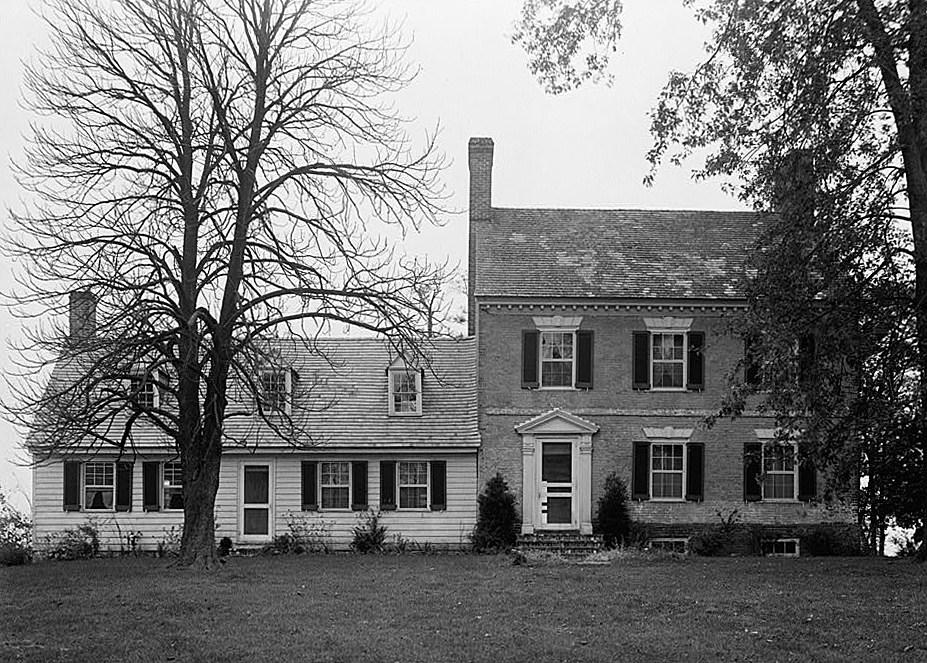
- Airy Hill in 1936

- Location within Maryland Location within the United States
- Nearest city: Chestertown, Maryland
- Coordinates: 39°11′34″N 76°5′36″W
- Architectural style: Federal
- NRHP reference No.: 96001478
- Added to NRHP: December 30, 1996

Airy Hill is a historic home located near Chestertown, Kent County, Maryland, United States. It is a two-section dwelling consisting of a 1 1/2-story frame wing and a two-story Federal-style brick house. The brick section was added in the early 1790s, together with a middle section that now connects the two. Also on the property is a brick smokehouse and an early-19th-century cemetery.

Airy Hill was listed on the National Register of Historic Places in 1996.
