= Chestertown station =

- Chestertown Railroad Station
- U.S. National Register of Historic Places
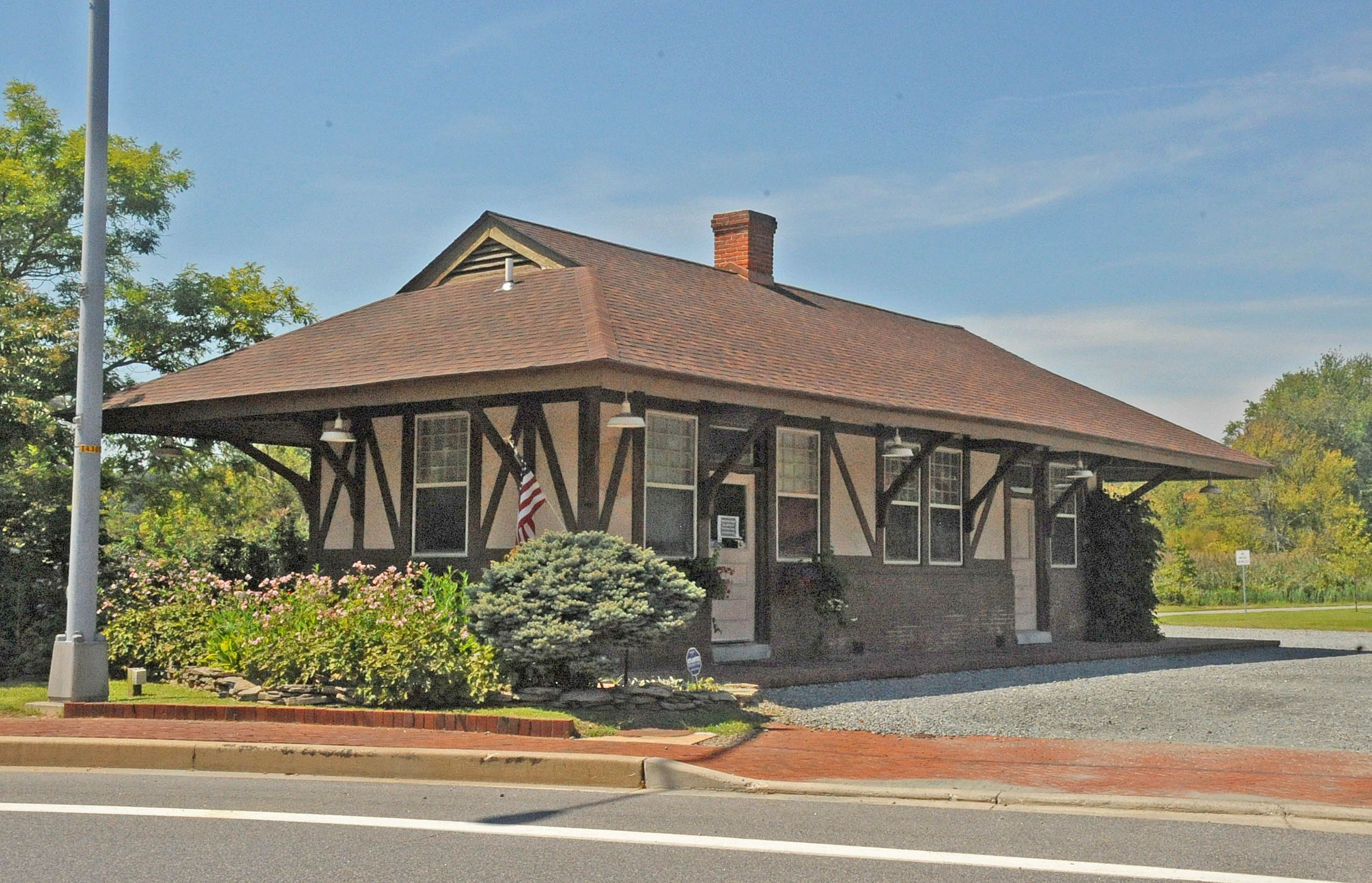

- Location within Maryland Location within the United States
- Location: Cross St., Chestertown, Maryland
- Coordinates: 39°12′28″N 76°4′8″W
- Built: 1902
- Architect: Culp, W. S. & Culp, A. M.
- Architectural style: Queen Anne
- NRHP reference No.: 82001597
- Added to NRHP: December 08, 1982

Chestertown is a historic railway station built in 1902–03 for the Pennsylvania Railroad and located in Chestertown, Kent County, Maryland. It is a 1 1/2-story, 17-by-47-foot (5.2 by 14.3 m) Queen Anne–style building. It features a hip roof with a wide bracketed overhang that provided shelter for train passengers on all four sides.

It was listed on the National Register of Historic Places in 1982 as the Chestertown Railroad Station.

Preceding station	Pennsylvania Railroad	Following station
Terminus	Chestertown Branch	Worton toward Townsend
