= Chestertown, Maryland =

- Town
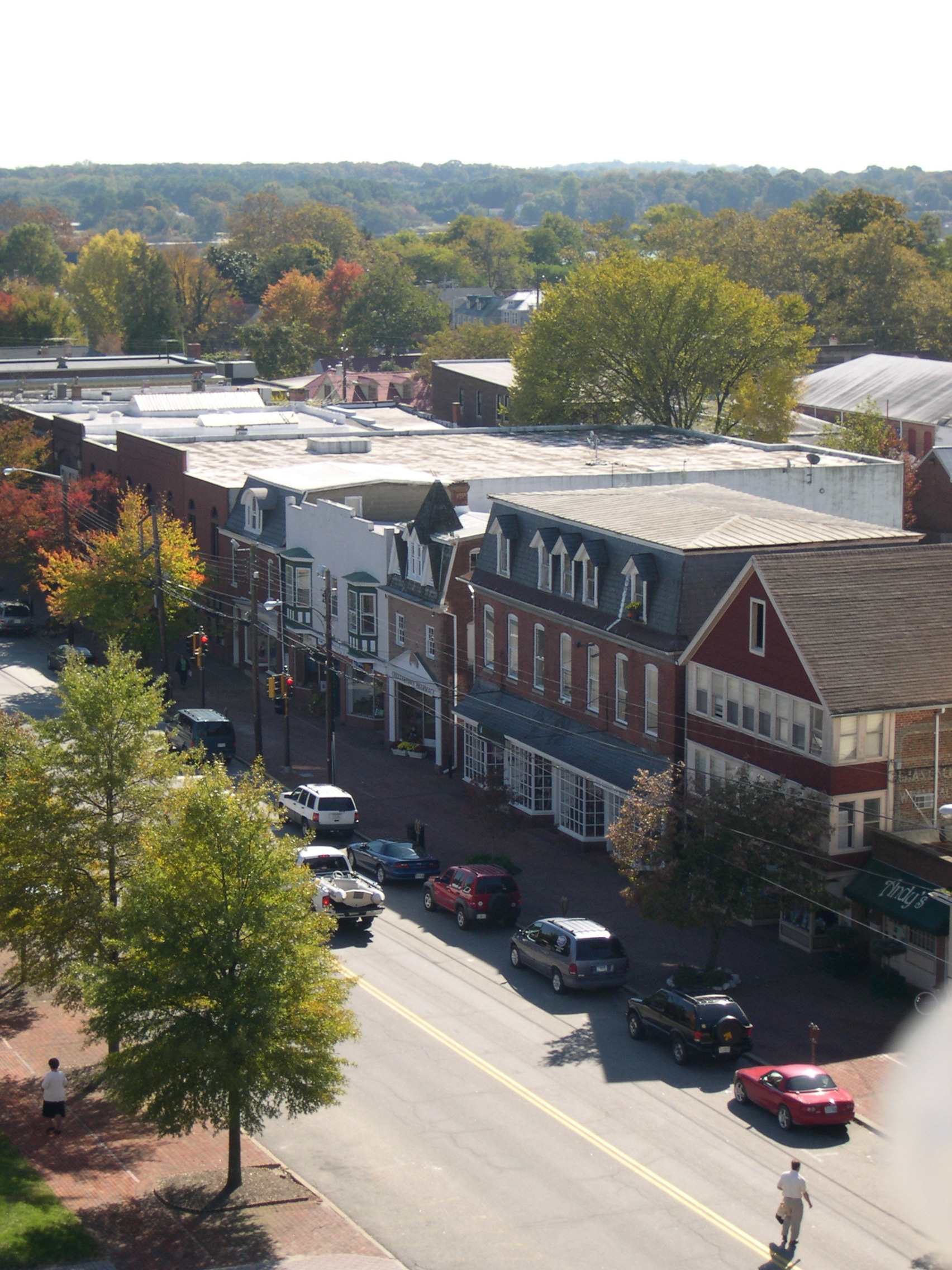
- High Street in Chestertown

- Flag Seal
- Motto: "Historic colonial town on the Chester River"
- Location in Kent County and Maryland

- Location within the U.S. state of Maryland Chestertown (the United States)
- Coordinates: 39°12′33″N 76°4′0″W
- Country: United States
- State: Maryland
- County: Kent
- Incorporated: 1805

Government
  - Type: Mayor-Council-Manager
  - Mayor: Hon. Meghan Efland

Area
  - Total: 3.29 sq mi (8.51 km^{2})
  - Land: 2.92 sq mi (7.56 km^{2})
  - Water: 0.37 sq mi (0.95 km^{2})
- Elevation: 20 ft (6 m)

Population (2020)
  - Total: 5,532
  - Density: 1,895.8/sq mi (731.98/km^{2})
- Time zone: UTC-5 (Eastern (EST))
  - Summer (DST): UTC-4 (EDT)
- ZIP codes: 21620, 21690
- Area codes: 410 and 443
- FIPS code: 24-16225
- Website: Chestertown, Maryland

Chestertown is a town in Kent County, Maryland, United States. The population was 5,532 as of the 2020 census. It is the county seat of Kent County, the oldest county in Maryland.

== History ==
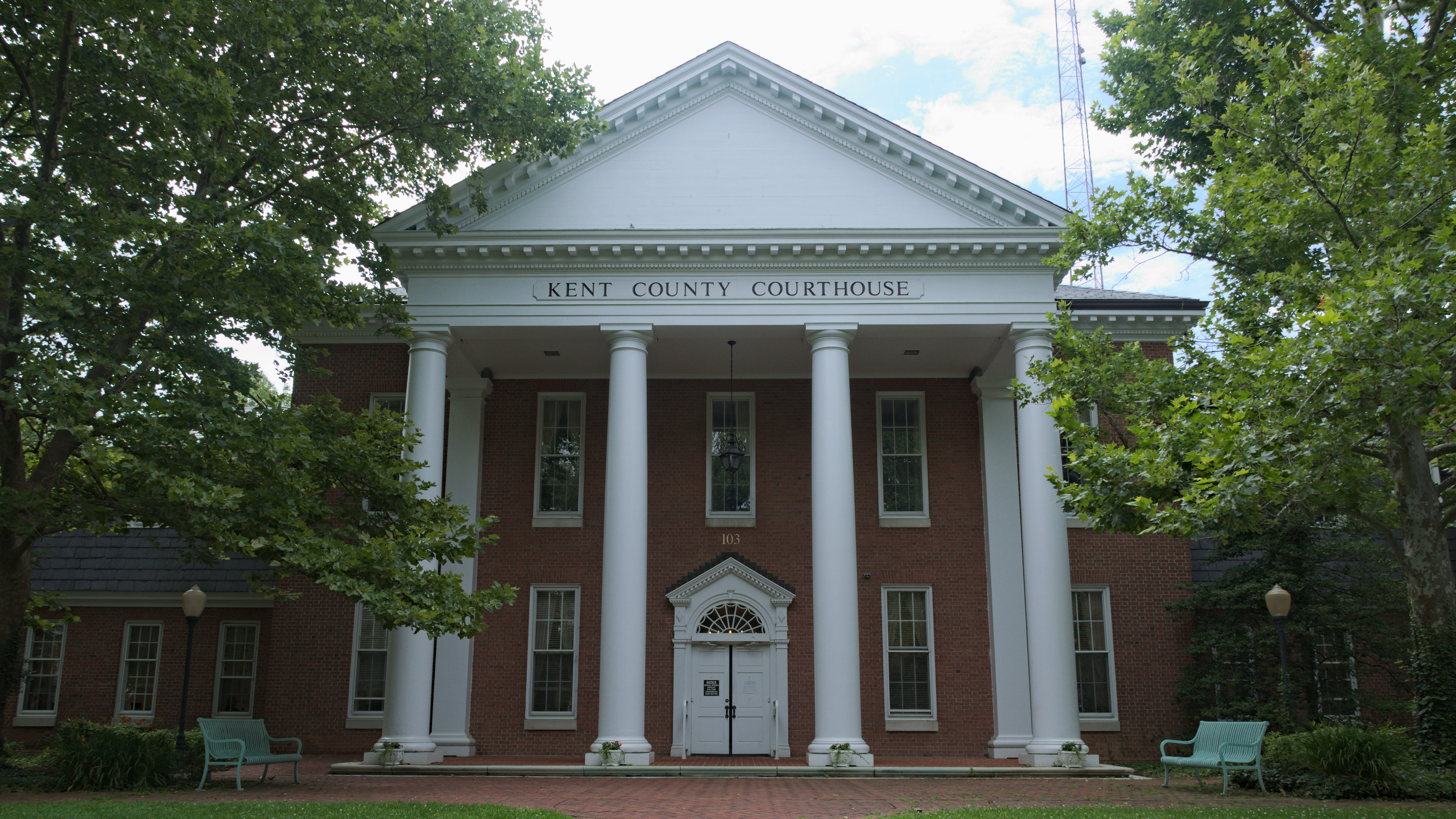
Kent County Courthouse in Chestertown

Indigenous peoples have lived in what is now Chestertown for thousands of years. At the time of European colonization, the primary tribe on the Eastern Shore was the Nanticoke. In Nanticoke oral tradition, their ancestors migrated south from "the land of snow and ice" through the Ohio Valley and the Allegheny Mountains until they reached the Eastern Shore. The Nanticokes spoke an Algonquian language.

Founded in 1706, Chestertown rose in stature when it was named one of the English colony of Maryland's six Royal Ports of Entry. The shipping boom that followed this designation made the town at the navigable head of the Chester River wealthy. In the mid-eighteenth century, Chestertown trailed only Annapolis and was considered Maryland's second leading port.

A burgeoning merchant class infused riches into the town, reflected in the many brick mansions and townhouses that sprang up along the waterfront. Another area in which Chestertown is second only to Annapolis is in its number of existing eighteenth century homes.

As of the 1790 census, Chestertown was the geographical center of population of the United States.

Chestertown was incorporated in 1805, and was named for the Chester River.

The town has several historic properties, including Airy Hill, Bernice J., Brampton, Carvill Hall, Chester Hall, the Chestertown Armory, the Chestertown Historic District, Chestertown Railroad Station, Denton House, Gobbler Hill, Godlington Manor, the Island Image, Lauretum, Piney Grove, Radcliffe Mill, Reward-Tilden's Farm, Rose Hill, the Silver Heel, Charles Sumner Post No. 25, Grand Army of the Republic, Thornton, Washington College: Middle, East and West Halls, and White House Farm (Chestertown, Maryland), each of which are listed on the National Register of Historic Places.

== Geography ==
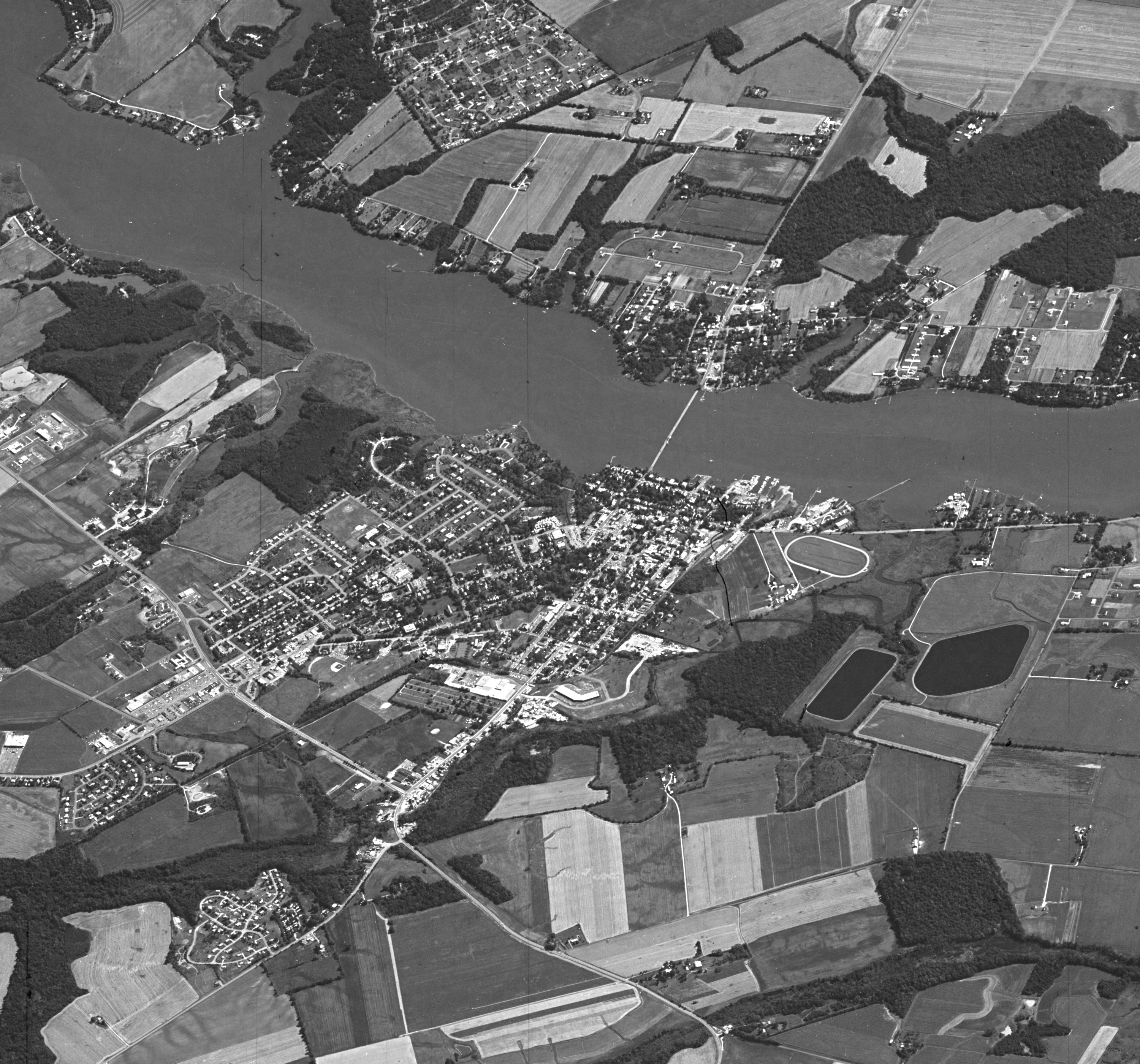
Chestertown in 1984

Chestertown is at 39°13′10″N 76°4′6″W (39.219328, -76.068424).

According to the U.S. Census Bureau, the town has a total area of 2.91 square miles (7.54 km^{2}), of which 2.60 square miles (6.73 km^{2}) is land and 0.31 square miles (0.80 km^{2}) is water. As of the first US Census in 1790, Chestertown was the geographical center of the nation's population.

=== Climate ===
The climate in this area is characterized by hot, humid summers and cool, wet winters. According to the Köppen Climate Classification system, Chestertown has a humid subtropical climate, abbreviated "Cfa" on climate maps.

Climate data for Chestertown, Maryland (1991–2020)
Month	Jan	Feb	Mar	Apr	May	Jun	Jul	Aug	Sep	Oct	Nov	Dec	Year
Mean daily maximum °F (°C)	40.8 (4.9)	44.2 (6.8)	52.5 (11.4)	64.4 (18.0)	73.6 (23.1)	82.2 (27.9)	86.6 (30.3)	85.0 (29.4)	78.3 (25.7)	66.8 (19.3)	55.5 (13.1)	45.4 (7.4)	64.6 (18.1)
Daily mean °F (°C)	34.0 (1.1)	36.2 (2.3)	43.8 (6.6)	54.7 (12.6)	64.2 (17.9)	73.1 (22.8)	77.7 (25.4)	76.1 (24.5)	69.2 (20.7)	57.4 (14.1)	46.8 (8.2)	38.3 (3.5)	56.0 (13.3)
Mean daily minimum °F (°C)	27.1 (−2.7)	28.1 (−2.2)	35.1 (1.7)	45.0 (7.2)	54.9 (12.7)	64.0 (17.8)	68.7 (20.4)	67.2 (19.6)	60.2 (15.7)	48.1 (8.9)	38.1 (3.4)	31.1 (−0.5)	47.3 (8.5)
Average precipitation inches (mm)	3.34 (85)	2.89 (73)	4.25 (108)	3.72 (94)	3.88 (99)	4.41 (112)	4.35 (110)	3.56 (90)	4.90 (124)	3.67 (93)	3.18 (81)	3.81 (97)	45.96 (1,166)
Average snowfall inches (cm)	5.2 (13)	7.9 (20)	1.7 (4.3)	0.2 (0.51)	0.0 (0.0)	0.0 (0.0)	0.0 (0.0)	0.0 (0.0)	0.0 (0.0)	0.0 (0.0)	0.0 (0.0)	1.7 (4.3)	16.7 (42.11)
Source: NOAA

== Demographics ==
Historical population
Census	Pop.	Note	%±
1860	1,539		—
1870	1,871		21.6%
1880	2,359		26.1%
1890	2,632		11.6%
1900	3,008		14.3%
1910	2,735		−9.1%
1920	2,537		−7.2%
1930	2,809		10.7%
1940	2,760		−1.7%
1950	3,143		13.9%
1960	3,602		14.6%
1970	3,476		−3.5%
1980	3,300		−5.1%
1990	4,005		21.4%
2000	4,746		18.5%
2010	5,252		10.7%
2020	5,532		5.3%
U.S. Decennial Census

=== 2020 census ===
As of the 2020 census, Chestertown had a population of 5,532. The median age was 37.9 years. 12.9% of residents were under the age of 18 and 27.3% of residents were 65 years of age or older. For every 100 females there were 79.6 males, and for every 100 females age 18 and over there were 75.1 males age 18 and over.

99.3% of residents lived in urban areas, while 0.7% lived in rural areas.

There were 2,137 households in Chestertown, of which 21.2% had children under the age of 18 living in them. Of all households, 33.1% were married-couple households, 18.5% were households with a male householder and no spouse or partner present, and 42.0% were households with a female householder and no spouse or partner present. About 42.0% of all households were made up of individuals and 25.5% had someone living alone who was 65 years of age or older.

There were 2,454 housing units, of which 12.9% were vacant. The homeowner vacancy rate was 3.0% and the rental vacancy rate was 7.9%.

Racial composition as of the 2020 census
Race	Number	Percent
White	3,744	67.7%
Black or African American	1,170	21.1%
American Indian and Alaska Native	17	0.3%
Asian	175	3.2%
Native Hawaiian and Other Pacific Islander	0	0.0%
Some other race	128	2.3%
Two or more races	298	5.4%
Hispanic or Latino (of any race)	340	6.1%

=== 2010 census ===
As of the census of 2010, there were 5,252 people, 1,971 households, and 984 families living in the town. The population density was 2,020.0 inhabitants per square mile (779.9/km^{2}). There were 2,361 housing units at an average density of 908.1 per square mile (350.6/km^{2}). The racial makeup of the town was 74.2% White, 20.4% African American, 0.3% Native American, 1.8% Asian, 1.0% from other races, and 2.2% from two or more races. Hispanic or Latino of any race were 4.2% of the population.

There were 1,971 households, of which 18.6% had children under the age of 18 living with them, 32.7% were married couples living together, 13.8% had a female householder with no husband present, 3.5% had a male householder with no wife present, and 50.1% were non-families. 42.2% of all households were made up of individuals, and 22.3% had someone living alone who was 65 years of age or older. The average household size was 2.00 and the average family size was 2.65.

The median age in the town was 34.9 years. 12.4% of residents were under the age of 18; 28.7% were between the ages of 18 and 24; 16.4% were from 25 to 44; 19.1% were from 45 to 64; and 23.6% were 65 years of age or older. The gender makeup of the town was 43.1% male and 56.9% female.

== Arts and culture ==
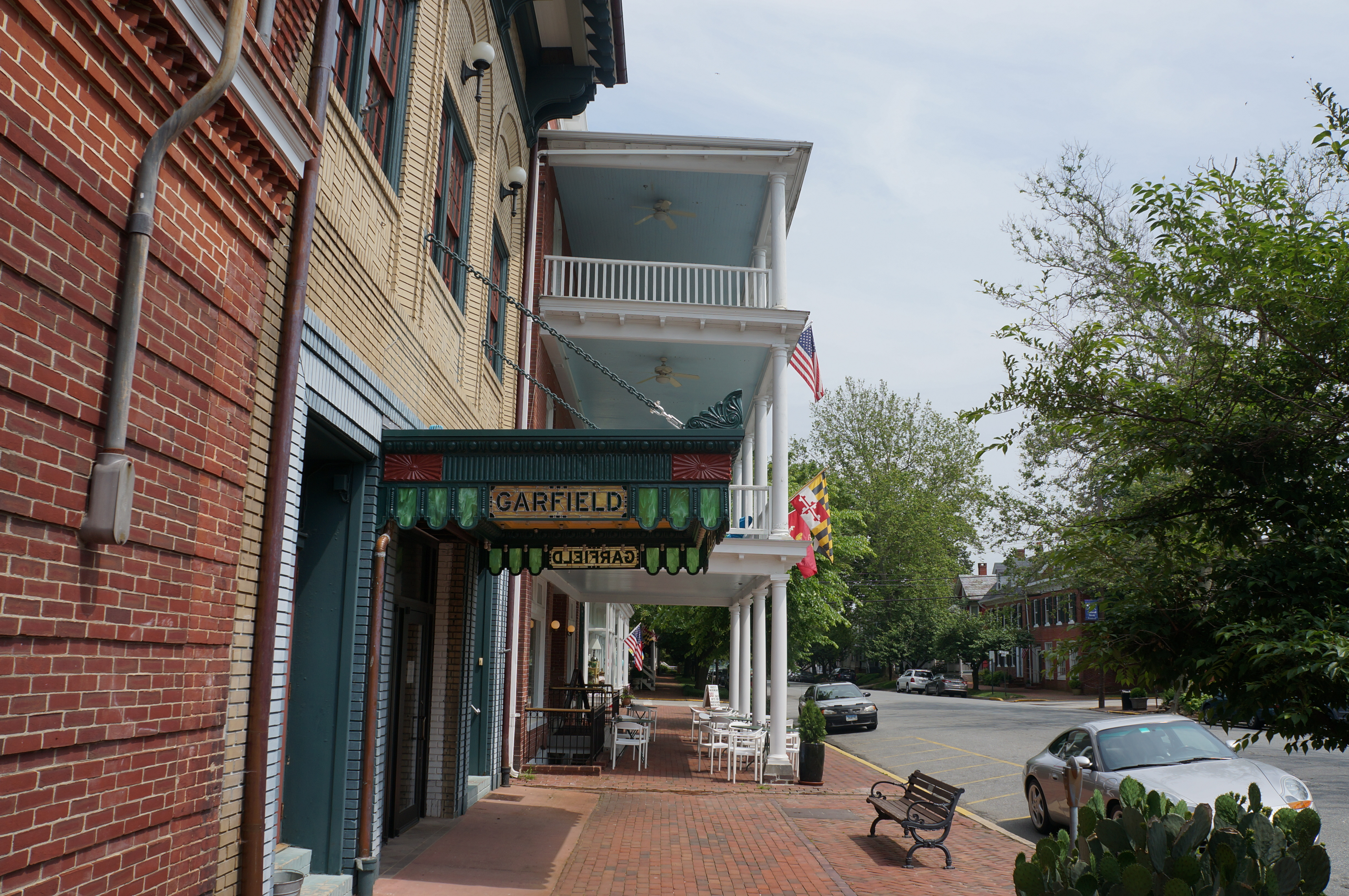
Garfield Theater on High Street in Chestertown

=== Chestertown Tea Party Festival ===
In May 1774, five months after the British closed the port at Boston Harbor following the Boston Tea Party, the citizens of Chestertown wrote a set of resolves that prohibited the buying, selling, or drinking of tea. Based on these resolutions, a popular legend has it that the citizens held their own tea party on the Chester River in an act of colonial defiance.

The Chestertown Tea Party Festival celebrates Chestertown's colonial heritage with a weekend of events on Memorial Day weekend, including a re-enactment of the legendary "tea party." A parade begins the festival, marching down High Street to the Chester River, and then follows with colonial music and dance, fife and drum performances, puppet shows, colonial crafts demonstrations and sales, military drills, and a walking tour of the historic district. In the afternoon, re-enactors, playing the part of angry citizens and Continental Soldiers, march to the docks where redcoats (played by members of the Maryland Loyalist Battalion) defend the ship for a short skirmish, then retire. The ship, the schooner Sultana, is then boarded by the angry citizens, and the tea is thrown into the Chester River.

=== Schooner Sultana ===
In 1997, John Swain came up with blueprints for a reproduction of the American-built yacht, later Royal Navy schooner HMS Sultana, planning the construction and home of the ship to be centered in Chestertown. In the same year the non-profit group Sultana Projects, Inc. was formed by Swain and supporters to fund construction of the ship. A shipyard was constructed and the keel for the Sultana was laid in October 1998. Over 3,000 students participated in the community and educationally led effort, with a core group of volunteers logging over 150,000 hours of time building the ship. Over 10,000 people were at the launching of the ship in March 2001, and since then more than 8,000 students a year have boarded the Sultana for educational trips. The Sultana also plays a key role in the Chestertown Tea Party, as it is now the official boat of the staged re-enactment. The Schooner Sultana website offers more detailed information on the ship.

=== Honors and accolades ===
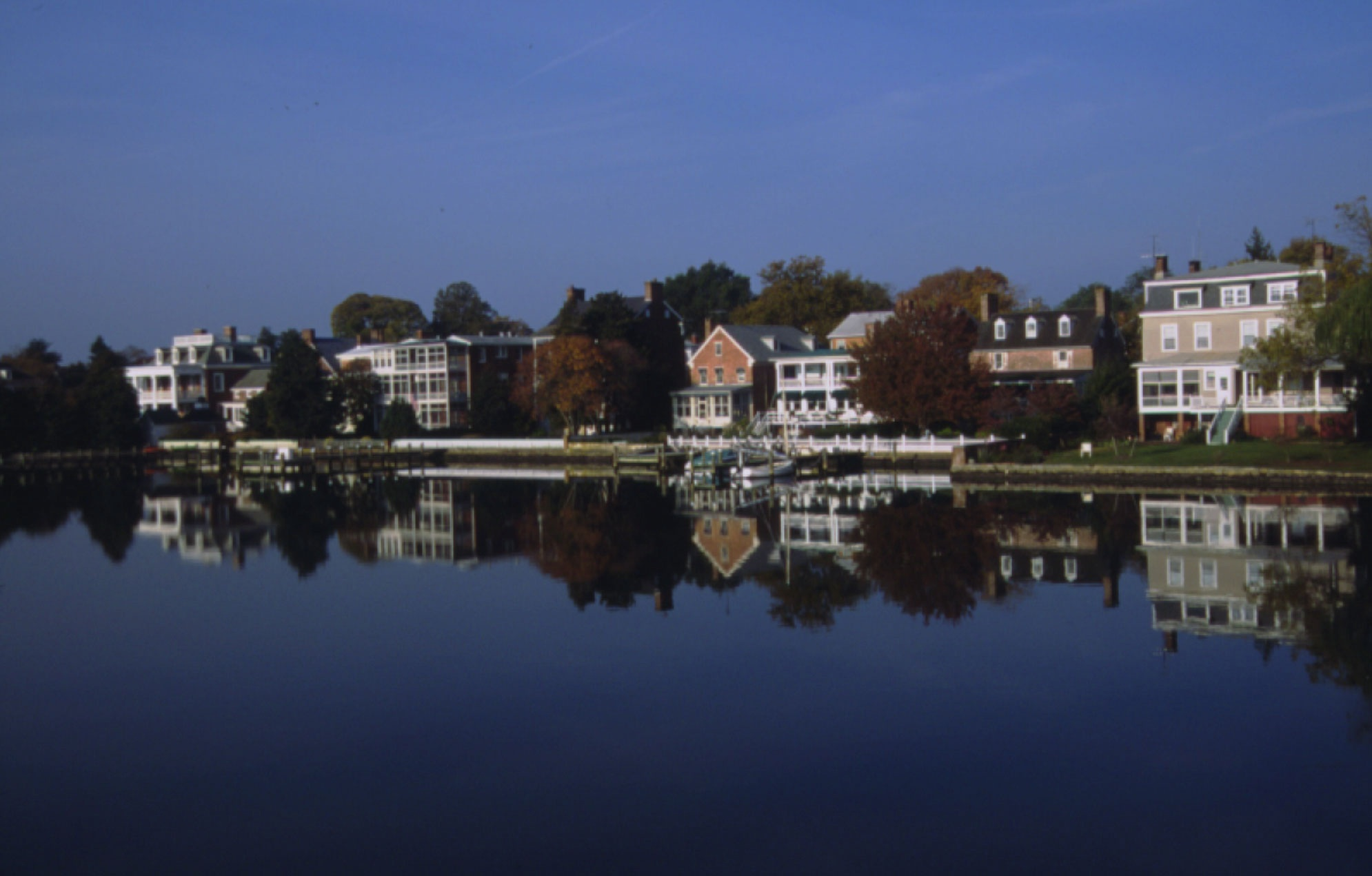
Chestertown's historic waterfront

The National Trust for Historic Preservation, the country's largest private, nonprofit preservation organization, named Chestertown, Maryland, to its 2007 list of America's Dozen Distinctive Destinations, an annual list of unique and lovingly preserved communities in the United States. Chestertown was selected from 63 destinations in 27 states that were nominated by individuals, preservation organizations, and local communities.

In 2008, Progressive Farmer magazine honored Kent County and Chestertown by naming it #1 in "Best Rural Places to Live in America". "For a county to be in Progressive Farmer's Best Places list, they hold them to the usual standards — good schools, health care, safety and other desirable qualities. But what makes Kent stand out is its residents' resolve to maintain a solid rural heritage."

=== First Friday ===
On the first Friday of each month, Chestertown residents, as well as neighboring towns' residents make their way down to Chestertown's main street. Many shops open their doors to visitors and put their merchandise on display. This event draws many people from the surrounding town area, as well as many students from Washington College.

== Education ==
Seal Of Washington College

Chestertown is in the Kent County Public Schools. Henry Highland Garnett Elementary School (named after Henry Highland Garnet), which had about 264 students as of 2021, and Kent County Middle School are in Chestertown, while Kent County High School is in an unincorporated area with a Worton postal address. The former Chestertown High School moved from its original 1915 building in 1953. In 1971 Kent County High opened and the former Chestertown High became Chestertown Middle School. The middle school became the consolidated Kent County Middle in 2010.

The town is home to Washington College, a private liberal arts college founded in 1782. Washington College is the tenth oldest college in the United States. George Washington was a founding patron.

The college is known nationally as the home of the Sophie Kerr Prize, which is awarded to the graduating senior with the most literary potential. The award is near $50,000 annually. For example, the 2014 prize, worth $61,382 was awarded at a ceremony in Baltimore to Alex Stinton, an Eastern Shore native.

The town is also home to Radcliffe Creek School, founded in 1996. The school is open to students with, and without, diagnosed learning disabilities. Radcliffe Creek was created for students ages 4 through 14, but a preschool program called 'little creek' was recently added as well. Students from several counties throughout Maryland attend the school.

Kent County Public Library maintains the Chestertown branch.

== Media ==
The Chestertown Spy is an online news source for Chestertown and the Chester River community.

The Kent County News, a weekly newspaper, covers news of the town and county.

WCTR Radio has been a local community resource since 1963. Originally an AM daytime station, it now has two FM frequencies: FM 106.9 in Chestertown serving Kent County, and FM 100.1 in Church Hill, serving Queen Anne's, Caroline, and Talbot Counties.

== Transportation ==
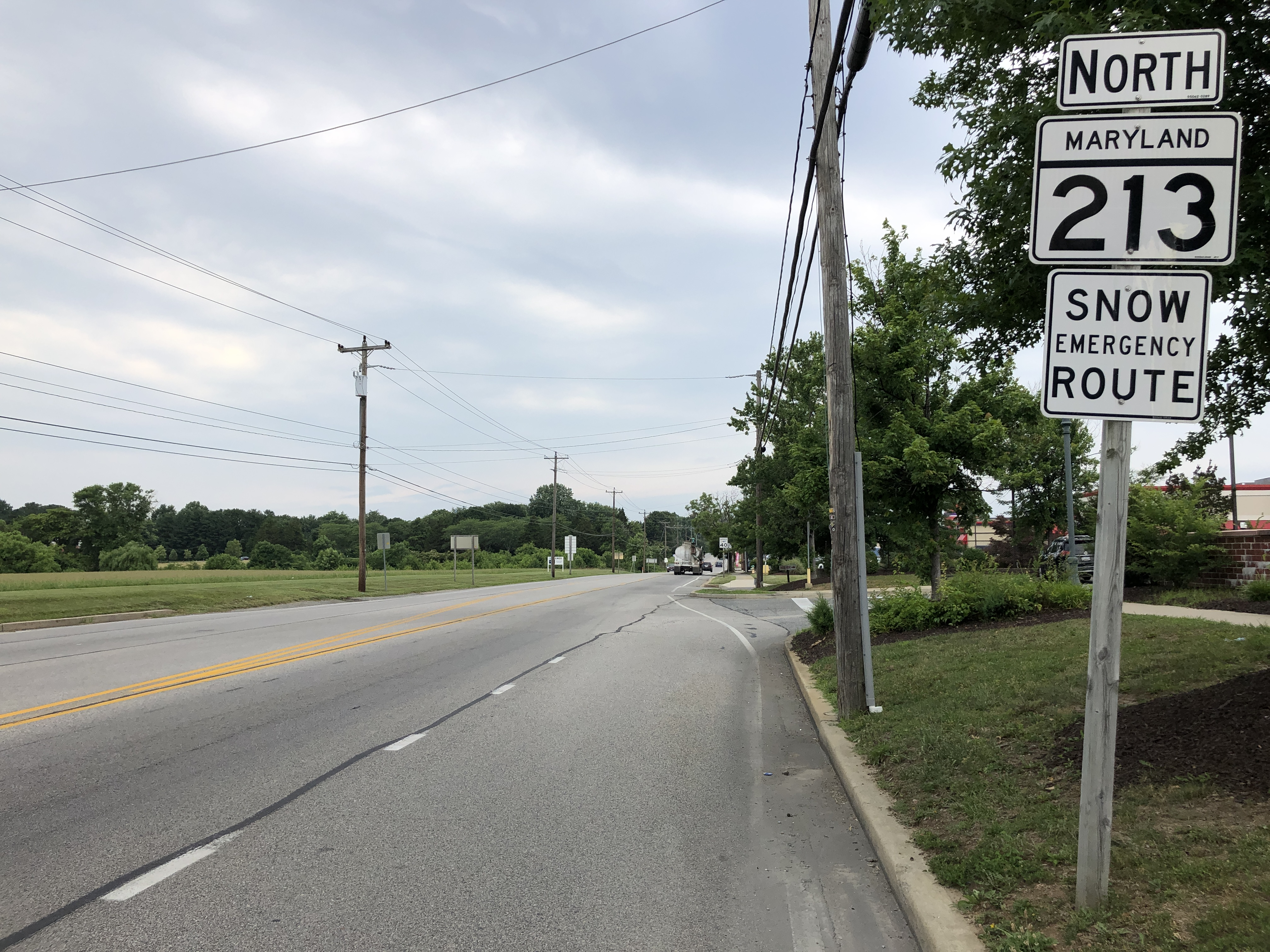
MD Route 213 North in Chestertown

The primary means of travel to and from Chestertown is by road. Maryland Route 213 is the most significant highway serving the town, and is the main north–south road along the eastern shore of the Chesapeake Bay. Other state highways serving the town include Maryland Route 20, Maryland Route 289, Maryland Route 291 and Maryland Route 514.

== Notable people ==
- Maria Louise Baldwin, educator and civic leader
- Tallulah Bankhead, actress (buried at St. Paul's Church in Fairlee)
- Seiko Kato Behr (1941–2010), Japanese-born American artist, potter, floral designer
- Gilbert Byron, author, born in Chestertown
- James M. Cain, author of Mildred Pierce and The Postman Always Rings Twice, lived in Chestertown in his youth
- Ezekiel Chambers, U.S. senator for Maryland, 1826–1834, and judge
- Miriam Cooper, silent film actress, best known for The Birth of a Nation
- Richard Ben Cramer, Pulitzer Prize-winning journalist and author
- Samuel Eccleston, Roman Catholic bishop, fifth Archbishop of Baltimore, from 1834 to 1851
- Henry Highland Garnet, abolitionist
- R. Clayton Mitchell Jr., member of Maryland House of Delegates, 1971–1993, and its Speaker from 1987 to 1993
- Bill "Swish" Nicholson, two-time MLB National League home run and RBI leader
- James Nicholson, officer in the Continental Navy during American Revolutionary War
- Joseph Hopper Nicholson, U.S. congressman for Maryland's 7th congressional district, 1799-1806 and judge of the Maryland Court of Appeals, 1806-1817
- Constance Stuart Larrabee, photographer/photo-journalist, best known for her South African portraiture and World War II European photo-journalism as South Africa's first female war correspondent
- James Peale, painter
- James Pearce, U.S. senator for Maryland, 1843–1862, and congressman; buried in New Chester Cemetery in Chestertown
- Ira Smith, college baseball player
- William Smith, founder of the Protestant Episcopal Church and first president of Washington College
- Ryan Thompson, Major League Baseball player
- George Vickers, U.S. senator for Maryland, 1867-1873
- William Holland Wilmer, president of the College of William and Mary, president of the House of Clerical and Lay Deputies of the Protestant Episcopal Church
- Robert Wright, U.S. senator, 1801–1806, Governor of Maryland, 1806–1809, and U.S. congressman for Maryland's 7th congressional district, 1810-1817 and 1821-1823
