= Godlington Manor =

Historic house in Maryland, United States

- U.S. National Register of Historic Places
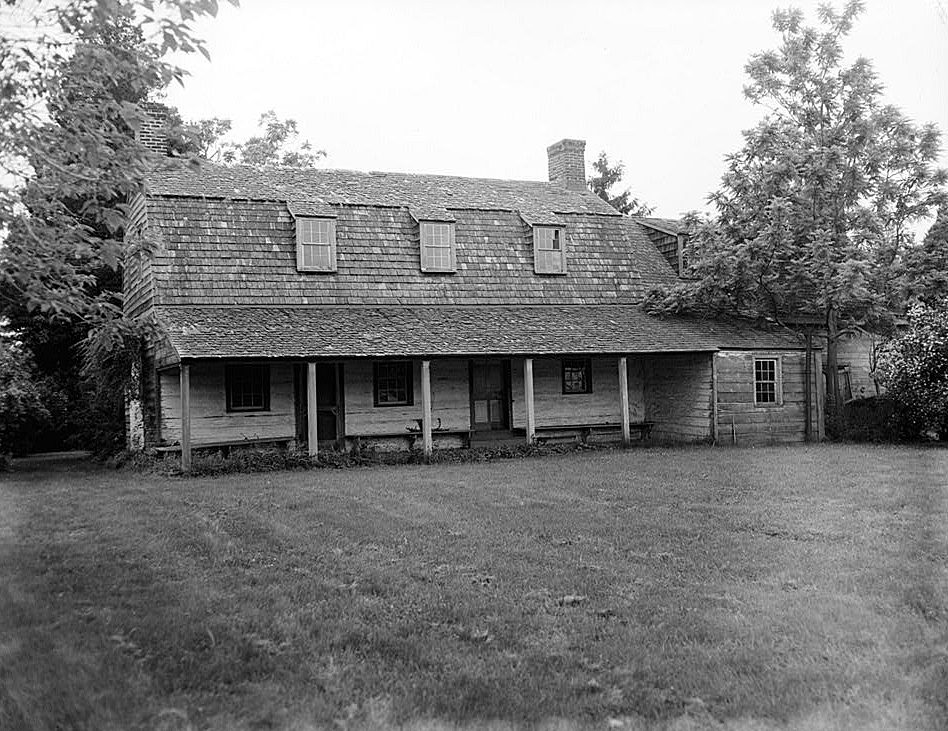
- Godlington Manor in 1972

- Location within Maryland Location within the United States
- Location: Wilkins Lane, Chestertown, Maryland
- Coordinates: 39°10′42″N 76°3′27″W
- Built: 1800
- NRHP reference No.: 72000583
- Added to NRHP: February 11, 1972

Godlington Manor is a historic home located near Chestertown, Kent County, Maryland, United States. It is a frame gambrel-roof structure with a long frame 1 1/2-story kitchen wing. The house features much of the original beaded clapboard. Also on the property is a frame milkhouse, a brick smokehouse, and a boxwood garden.

Godlington Manor was listed on the National Register of Historic Places in 1972.
