= Clark's Conveniency =

Historic house in Maryland, United States

- U.S. National Register of Historic Places
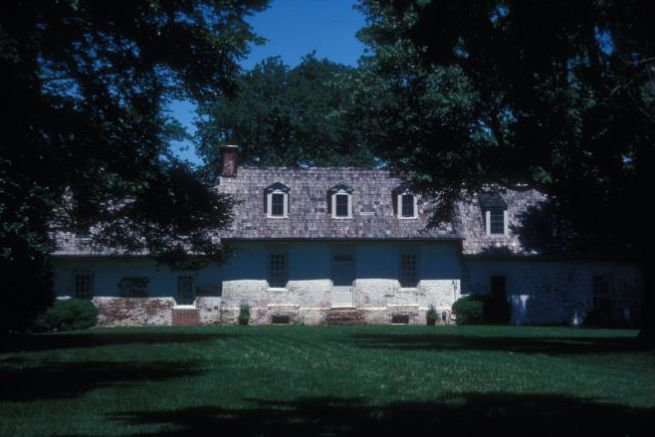

- Location within Maryland Location within the United States
- Nearest city: Pomona, Maryland
- Coordinates: 39°8′27″N 76°7′18″W
- Built: 1735
- NRHP reference No.: 75000906
- Added to NRHP: September 09, 1975

Clark's Conveniency is a historic home located near Pomona, Kent County, Maryland, United States. It is a 1 1/2-story, early-18th-century brick house built in three sections: the main block and a wing on the east and west ends. It is representative of the houses built by the smaller but still prosperous planters of 18th-century tidewater Maryland.

Clark's Conveniency was listed on the National Register of Historic Places in 1975.
