= Maryland Route 298 =

Highway in Maryland

Maryland Route 298
- Maryland Route 298 highlighted in red

Route information
- Maintained by MDSHA
- Length: 20.14 mi (32.41 km)
- Existed: 1930–present
- Tourist routes: Chesapeake Country Scenic Byway

Major junctions
- West end: MD 20 near Fairlee
- MD 514 at Melitota; MD 297 in Butlertown; MD 561 at Lynch; MD 292 near Still Pond; MD 566 near Still Pond; MD 213 near Kennedyville
- East end: MD 291 near Chesterville

Location
- Country: United States
- State: Maryland
- Counties: Kent

Highway system
- Maryland highway system; Interstate; US; State; Scenic Byways
← MD 297	→ MD 299

Maryland Route 298 (MD 298) is a state highway in the U.S. state of Maryland. The highway runs 20.14 miles (32.41 km) from MD 20 near Fairlee east to MD 291 near Chesterville. MD 298 is a C-shaped highway that connects Fairlee, MD 213, and Millington with several villages in northern Kent County, including Butlertown, Lynch, and Still Pond. The highway also provides a bypass of Chestertown between the western and eastern parts of the county. MD 298 was built from Fairlee to MD 292 near Still Pond around 1930 and reconstructed in the early 1950s. The highway was extended eastward to MD 566 east of Still Pond in the mid-1950s, to MD 213 in the early 1960s, and to MD 291 in the late 1980s.

== Route description ==
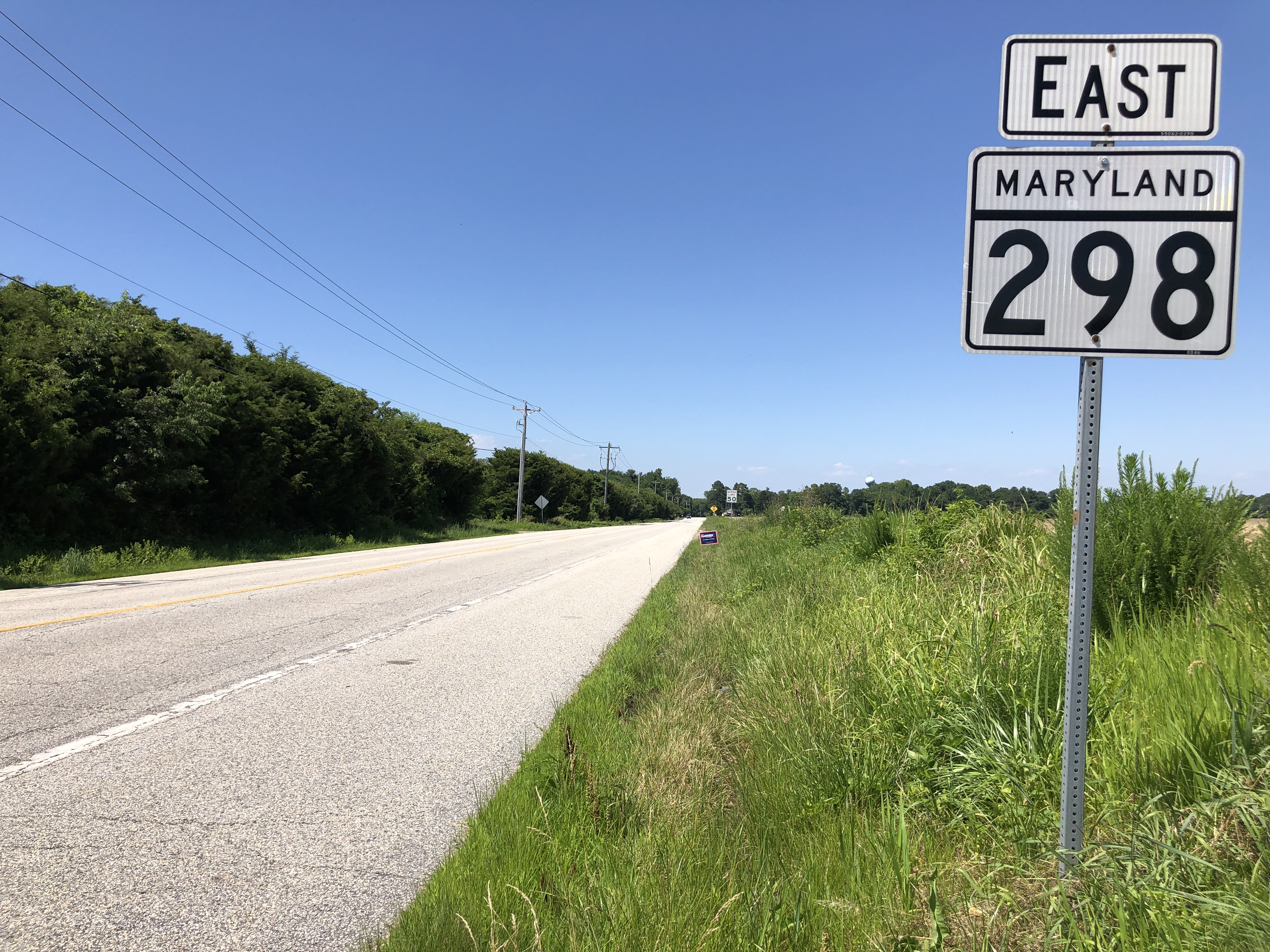
View east along MD 298 at MD 20 near Fairlee

MD 298 begins at an intersection with MD 20 (Rock Hall Road) south of the village of Fairlee. The highway heads north as two-lane undivided Fairlee Road through the village, where the highway intersects Old Fairlee Road. MD 298 heads northeast through the hamlet of Melitota, where the highway meets the northern end of MD 514 (Melitota Road), and Hanesville, where the highway crosses Mills Branch its name changes to Lambs Meadow Road at Hanesville Road. MD 298 curves to the east and passes through the community of Butlertown, where the highway intersects the northern terminus of MD 297 (Worton Road) and passes north of Kent County High School. East of Butlertown, the highway passes the Christ Church, Graveyard and Sexton's House complex and the historic home Hopeful Unity.

MD 298 continues to Lynch, where the highway meets the northern end of MD 561 (Hassengers Corner Road) and curves northeast parallel to the loop of MD 856 (Old Lynch Road). The highway passes to the south and east of the village of Still Pond, intersecting the southern terminus of MD 292 (Still Pond Road) to the south and the eastern terminus of MD 566 (Stillpond Harmony Road) to the east. MD 298 continues east to an intersection with MD 213 (Augustine Herman Highway) at Harmony Corner northeast of Kennedyville. The highway continues southeast as Browntown Road, which intersects the Chestertown Branch of the Northern Line of the Maryland and Delaware Railroad at-grade and crosses Morgan Creek. At Morgnec Road west of Chesterville, MD 298 turns east onto Old Morgnec Road and then south onto Cherry Lane. The state highway reaches its eastern terminus at MD 291 (River Road) southwest of Chesterville.

== History ==
The first portion of modern MD 298 to be constructed was the portion south of Fairlee, which was constructed as a concrete road as part of the Chestertown–Rock Hall road (now MD 20) in 1918. The highway proper was constructed as a concrete road from MD 20 in Fairlee to MD 292 south of Still Pond in 1929 and 1930. MD 298 from Fairlee to Butlertown was widened to 20 feet (6.1 m) and resurfaced with bituminous concrete in 1950. The widening and resurfacing continued along stretch from Butlertown to Lynch in 1951 and 1952. The construction at Lynch included smoothing the curve just east of MD 561; the old curve later became MD 856. MD 298 was extended to its present southern terminus when MD 20 bypassed Fairlee in 1953.

The first eastward extension of MD 298 was when the highway from MD 292 to MD 566 was constructed as a gravel road in 1951 and 1952. The portion from MD 566 to US 213 was constructed around 1946 as part of MD 566, which was widened to 20 feet (6.1 m) starting in 1953. MD 298 was extended east to US 213 along part of MD 566 in 1963 to form a continuous route between MD 20 at Fairlee and US 213 at Harmony Corner. That extension was resurfaced with bituminous concrete in 1970. MD 298 was extension south from MD 213 over Browntown Road, Old Morgnec Road, and Cherry Lane to MD 291 in 1988 after those highways were transferred from county to state maintenance in a December 1, 1987, road transfer agreement.

== Junction list ==
The entire route is in Kent County.

Location	mi	km	Destinations	Notes
Fairlee	0.00	0.00	MD 20 (Rock Hall Road) – Rock Hall, Chestertown	Western terminus
Melitota	3.66	5.89	MD 514 south (Melitota Road) – Chestertown	Northern terminus of MD 514
Butlertown	7.39	11.89	MD 297 south (Worton Road) – Worton, Chestertown	Northern terminus of MD 297
Lynch	9.43	15.18	MD 561 south (Hassengers Corner Road)	Northern terminus of MD 561
Still Pond	10.99	17.69	MD 292 north (Still Pond Road) – Betterton	Southern terminus of MD 292
Still Pond	12.31	19.81	MD 566 west (Stillpond Harmony Road) – Betterton	Eastern terminus of MD 566
	14.91	24.00	MD 213 (Augustine Herman Highway) – Galena, Kennedyville, Chestertown	
	20.14	32.41	MD 291 (River Road) – Chestertown, Millington	Eastern terminus
1.000 mi = 1.609 km; 1.000 km = 0.621 mi

== Auxiliary routes ==
MD 298 has one former auxiliary route and one existing auxiliary route. Both routes were created after MD 20 bypassed Fairlee in 1953.

- MD 298A was the designation for Old Fairlee Road, which ran 0.50 miles (0.80 km) from MD 298 in Fairlee to MD 20 east of Fairlee. The highway was part of the Chestertown–Rock Hall road paved in concrete in 1917. This part of MD 20 became MD 298A after MD 20 bypassed Fairlee in 1953. MD 298A was transferred to county maintenance through a December 1, 1987, road transfer agreement.
- MD 298B is the unnamed 0.08-mile-long (0.13 km) one-lane ramp from MD 298 to westbound MD 20 south of Fairlee and west of MD 298's perpendicular terminal intersection at MD 20. The highway was part of the Chestertown–Rock Hall road paved in concrete in 1918.
