= Georgetown, northeastern Kent County, Maryland =

Unincorporated community in Maryland, United States

Georgetown, Maryland
- Unincorporated community
- Location within Maryland Location within the United States
- Coordinates: 39°21′42″N 75°52′49″W
- Country: United States
- State: Maryland
- County: Kent
- Elevation: 33 ft (10 m)
- Time zone: UTC-5 (Eastern (EST))
  - Summer (DST): UTC-4 (EDT)
- ZIP code: 21930
- Area codes: 410, 443, and 667
- GNIS feature ID: 590291

Georgetown is an unincorporated community in northeastern Kent County, Maryland, United States. The community was laid out in 1736. Georgetown was named for Prince George who later became King of the United Kingdom. Georgetown is located on the south side of the Sassafras River at the Maryland Route 213 bridge, north of Galena and south of Cecilton. Directly to the north across the river is the unincorporated community of Fredericktown in Cecil County.

The Nellie Crockett and Valley Cottage are listed on the National Register of Historic Places.

== Education ==
It is in the Kent County Public Schools. Kent County Middle School is in Chestertown, and Kent County High School is in an unincorporated area, in the Butlertown CDP with a Worton postal address.

The community was formerly assigned to Millington Elementary School. In 2017 the school board voted to close Millington Elementary School.
