= Golts, Maryland =

Unincorporated community in Maryland, United States

- Unincorporated community
- Location within Maryland
- Coordinates: 39°20′12″N 75°46′29″W
- Country: United States
- State: Maryland
- County: Kent
- Elevation: 79 ft (24 m)
- Time zone: UTC-5 (Eastern (EST))
  - Summer (DST): UTC-4 (EDT)
- ZIP code: 21635
- Area codes: 410, 443, and 667
- GNIS feature ID: 584636

Golts is an unincorporated community in Kent County, Maryland, United States. Golts is located at the intersection of Delaware Line Road and Black Bottom Road, east of Galena and west of the Delaware border.

== Education ==
It is in the Kent County Public Schools. Kent County Middle School is in Chestertown, and Kent County High School is in an unincorporated area, in the Butlertown CDP with a Worton postal address.

The community was formerly assigned to Millington Elementary School. In 2017 the school board voted to close Millington Elementary School.
