= Maryland Route 561 =

State highway in Maryland, United States

Maryland Route 561
- Hassengers Corner Road
- Maryland Route 561 highlighted in red

Route information
- Maintained by MDSHA
- Length: 2.48 mi (3.99 km)
- Existed: 1933–present

Major junctions
- South end: MD 213 at Hassengers Corner
- North end: MD 298 at Lynch

Location
- Country: United States
- State: Maryland
- Counties: Kent

Highway system
- Maryland highway system; Interstate; US; State; Scenic Byways
← MD 560	→ MD 562

Maryland Route 561 (MD 561) is a state highway in the U.S. state of Maryland. Known as Hassengers Corner Road, the state highway runs 2.48 miles (3.99 km) from MD 213 at Hassengers Corner north to MD 298 in Lynch in central Kent County. MD 561 was constructed in the early 1930s and widened around 1950.

== Route description ==
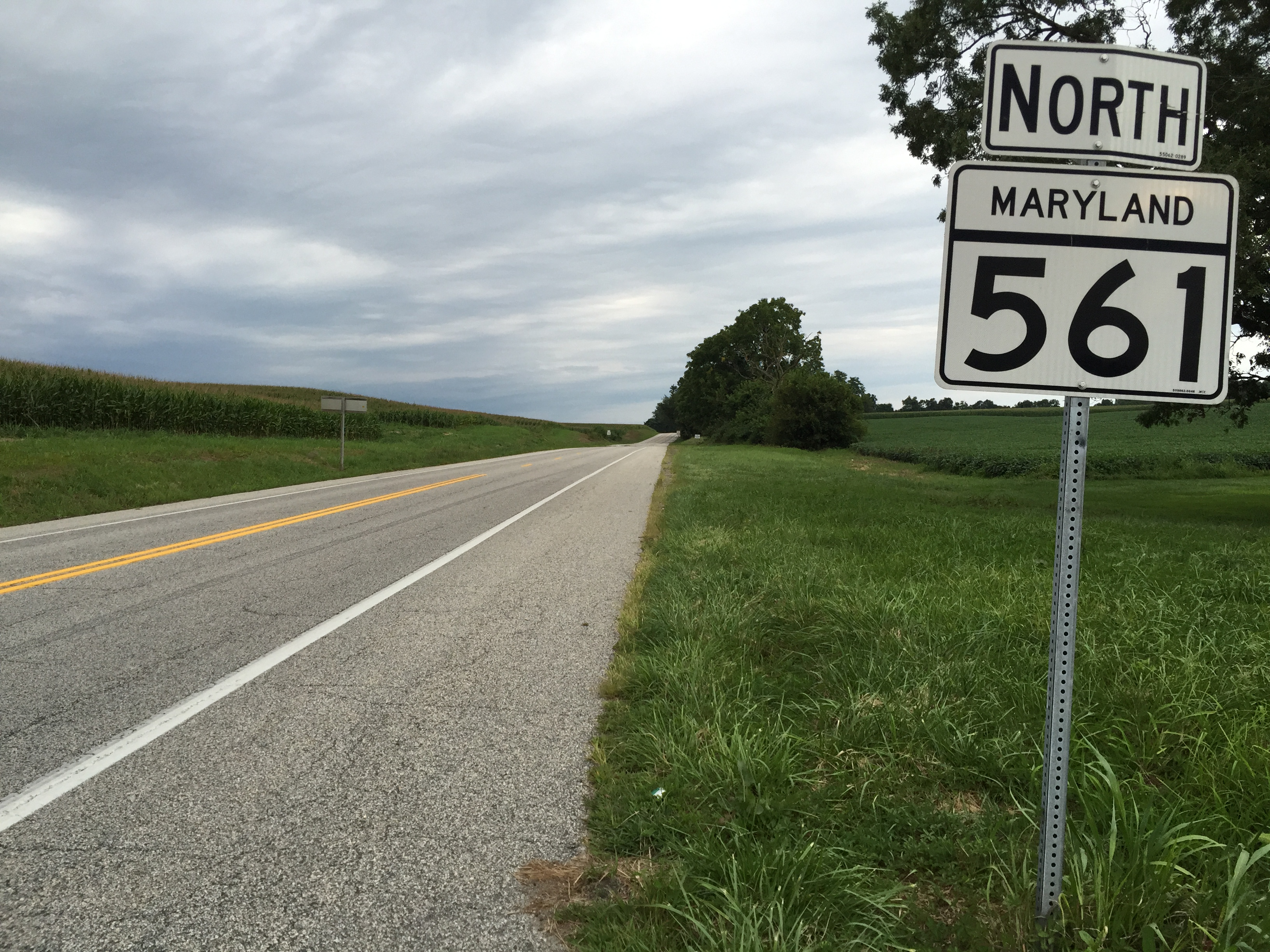
View north along MD 561 at MD 213 in Hassengers Corner

MD 561 begins at an intersection with MD 213 (Augustine Herman Highway) at Hassengers Corner, a crossroads hamlet between Chestertown and Kennedyville. The two-lane undivided highway heads north to the unincorporated village of Lynch, where it intersects the Chestertown Branch of the Northern Line of the Maryland and Delaware Railroad. North of the railroad, MD 561 reaches its northern terminus at MD 298 (Lambs Meadow Road).

== History ==
MD 561 was constructed as a macadam road by 1933. The highway was widened and resurfaced in 1949 and 1950.

== Junction list ==
The entire route is in Kent County.

Location	mi	km	Destinations	Notes
Hassengers Corner	0.00	0.00	MD 213 (Augustine Herman Highway) – Chestertown, Kennedyville	Southern terminus
Lynch	2.48	3.99	MD 298 (Lambs Meadow Road) – Worton, Still Pond	Northern terminus
1.000 mi = 1.609 km; 1.000 km = 0.621 mi
