= Maryland Route 299 =

Highway in Maryland

Maryland Route 299
- Maryland Route 299 highlighted in red

Route information
- Maintained by MDSHA
- Length: 5.67 mi (9.12 km)
- Existed: 1929–present

Major junctions
- South end: MD 313 / MD 330 at Massey
- MD 290 at Sassafras
- North end: US 301 near Warwick

Location
- Country: United States
- State: Maryland
- Counties: Kent, Cecil

Highway system
- Maryland highway system; Interstate; US; State; Scenic Byways
← MD 298	→ MD 300

Maryland Route 299 (MD 299) is a state highway in the U.S. state of Maryland. The highway runs 5.67 miles (9.12 km) from MD 313 and MD 330 at Massey in eastern Kent County north to U.S. Route 301 (US 301) near Warwick in far southern Cecil County. MD 299 was constructed from Massey to Sassafras around 1930 and from there to MD 282 in Warwick in the early 1930s. The highway between US 301 and MD 282 was transferred to county control in 1958.

== Route description ==
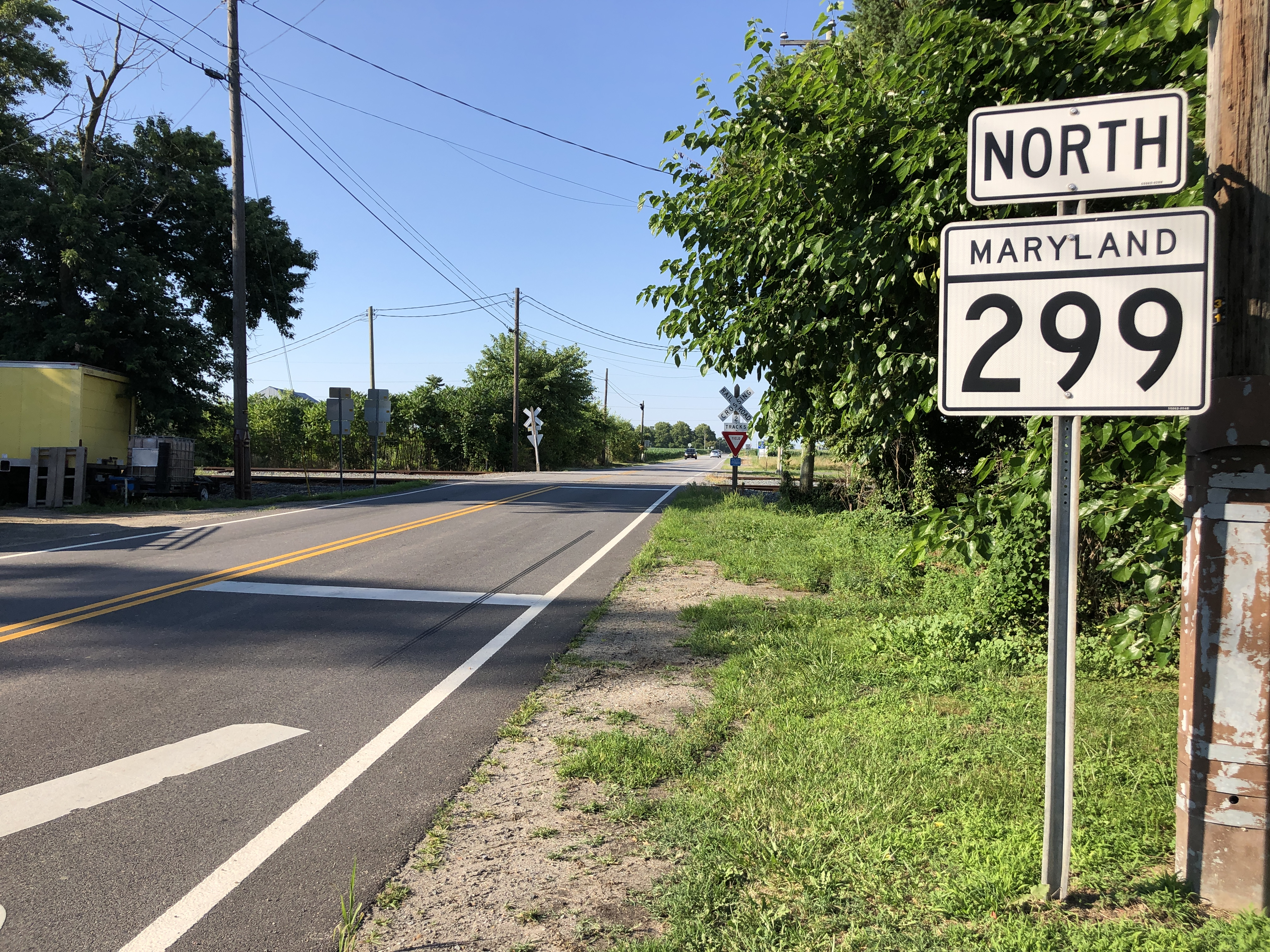
View north along MD 299 at MD 313 and MD 330 in Massey

MD 299 begins at a four-way intersection with MD 313 and MD 330 at the hamlet of Massey in eastern Kent County. MD 313 heads northbound to the west and southbound as Galena Road, and MD 330 heads eastbound as Maryland Line Road. MD 299 heads northbound as two-lane undivided Massey Road and immediately has a grade crossing of the Chestertown Branch of the Northern Line of the Maryland and Delaware Railroad just west of the junction of the Centreville and Chestertown branches of the Northern Line. The highway crosses Jacobs Creek before an intersection with the northern terminus of MD 290 (Galena Sassafras Road). MD 299 continues northeast as Galena Sassafras Road, which passes the historic home Rich Hill and crosses Herring Branch into the village of Sassafras. At the north end of the village, the highway crosses the Sassafras River into Cecil County, where the name of the highway changes to Massey Sassafras Road. MD 299 reaches its northern terminus at US 301 (Blue Star Memorial Highway). Sassafras Road continues northeast toward an intersection with MD 282 in the village of Warwick.

== History ==
MD 299 was paved as a concrete road from Massey to Sassafras in two sections in 1929 and 1930. The highway from Sassafras to MD 282 in Warwick was completed as a concrete road in 1933. The portion of MD 299 north of US 301 was transferred from state to county maintenance through a May 8, 1958, road transfer agreement. The highway was widened and resurfaced with bituminous concrete in 1976. MD 299 previously connected to DE 299 when it continued to Warwick.

== Junction list ==
County	Location	mi	km	Destinations	Notes
Kent	Massey	0.00	0.00	MD 313 (Galena Road) / MD 330 east (Maryland Line Road) – Galena, Millington	Southern terminus; western terminus of MD 330
Kent	Sassafras	4.21	6.78	MD 290 south (Galena Sassafras Road) – Galena	Northern terminus of MD 290
Cecil	Warwick	5.67	9.12	US 301 (Blue Star Memorial Highway) / Sassafras Road north – Bay Bridge, Wilmington	Northern terminus; US 301 north of this intersection is a toll road
1.000 mi = 1.609 km; 1.000 km = 0.621 mi

== Auxiliary route ==
- MD 299A is the unsigned designation for Massey Road Spur, which runs 0.06 miles (0.097 km) from MD 299 north to MD 290 in Sassafras, Kent County. The route was designated in 2012.
