= Maryland Route 297 =

State highway in Maryland, United States

Maryland Route 297
- Worton Road
- Maryland Route 297 highlighted in red

Route information
- Maintained by MDSHA
- Length: 3.59 mi (5.78 km)
- Existed: 1927–present

Major junctions
- South end: MD 213 near Chestertown
- North end: MD 298 in Butlertown

Location
- Country: United States
- State: Maryland
- Counties: Kent

Highway system
- Maryland highway system; Interstate; US; State; Scenic Byways
← MD 295	→ MD 298

Maryland Route 297 (MD 297) is a state highway in the U.S. state of Maryland. Known as Worton Road, the highway runs 3.59 miles (5.78 km) from MD 213 near Chestertown north to MD 298 in Butlertown in central Kent County. MD 297 was constructed in the late 1920s and reconstructed in the early 1970s. The highway from Butlertown to Newtown was part of MD 297 between 1942 and 1993.

== Route description ==
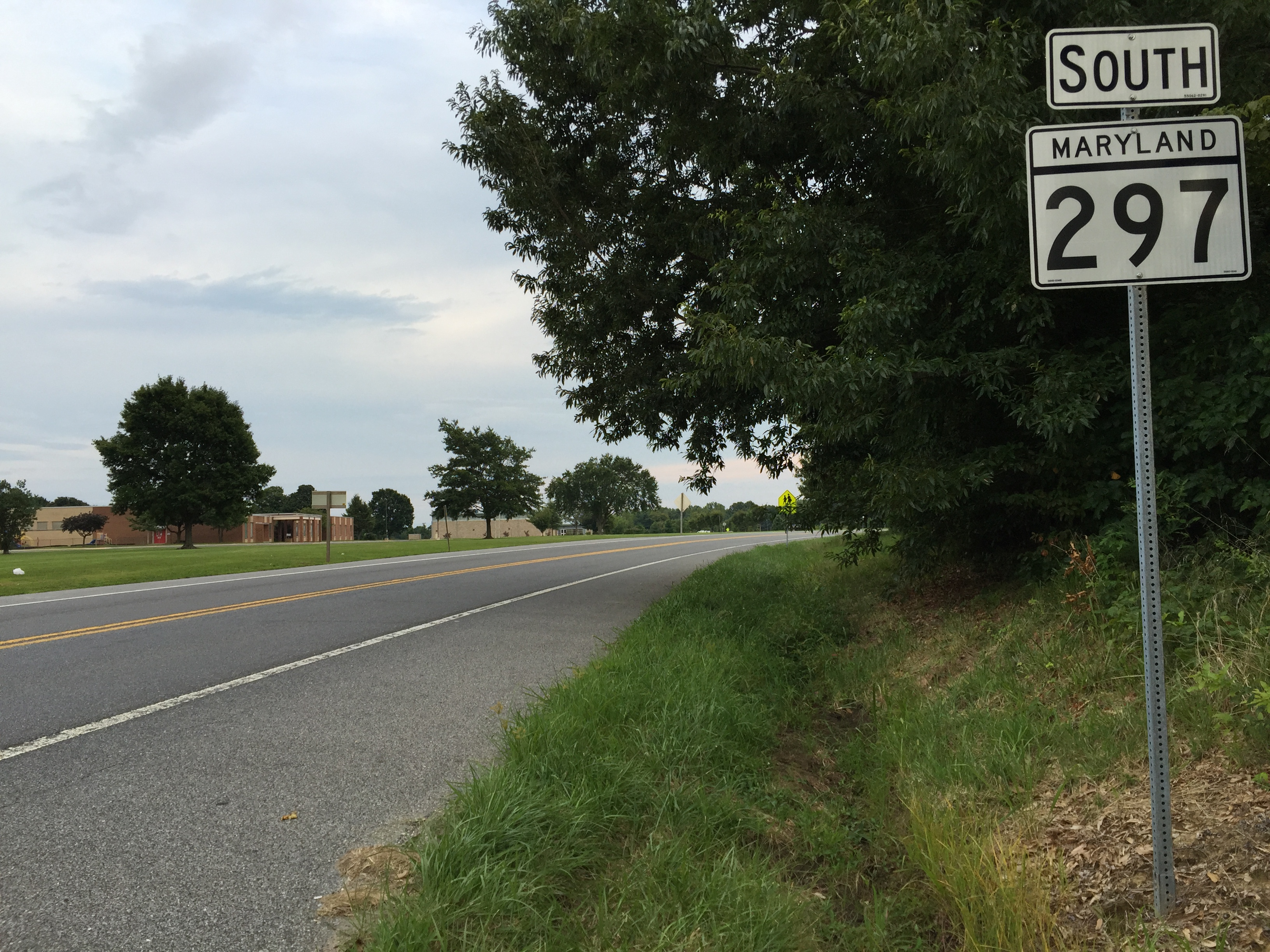
View south along MD 297 at MD 298 in Butlertown

MD 297 begins at MD 213 (Augustine Herman Highway) north of Chestertown. The two-lane undivided highway heads north and parallels the Chestertown Branch of the Northern Line of the Maryland and Delaware Railroad north of Mary Morris Road. MD 297 crosses the rail line at-grade in the community of Worton, where the route passes west of Worton Regional Park. The highway continues to its northern terminus at MD 298 (Lambs Meadow Road) just west of Kent County High School in the hamlet of Butlertown. The highway continues on the opposite side of MD 298 as county-maintained Smithville Road.

== History ==
MD 297 was constructed as a concrete road from the U.S. Route 213 (now MD 213) end starting in 1926. The highway was completed to Mary Morris Road in 1927. MD 297 was extended through Worton to Butlertown in 1928. Smithville Road was improved and transferred to the state highway system from Butlertown through Smithtown to the village of Newtown in 1942. The portion of MD 297 from US 213 to MD 298 was reconstructed in 1973. As part of that project, the highway was relocated at the MD 298 end to remove the staggered intersections between MD 297 and MD 298 in Butlertown, leaving behind MD 297A. The Butlertown–Newtown portion of MD 297 was resurfaced with bituminous concrete in 1982; that section was transferred from state to county maintenance through a June 1, 1993, road transfer agreement.

== Junction list ==
The entire route is in Kent County.

Location	mi	km	Destinations	Notes
Chestertown	0.00	0.00	MD 213 (Augustine Herman Highway) – Church Hill, Kennedyville	Southern terminus
Butlertown	3.59	5.78	MD 298 (Lambs Meadow Road) / Smithville Road north – Fairlee, Lynch	Northern terminus
1.000 mi = 1.609 km; 1.000 km = 0.621 mi

== Auxiliary route ==
MD 297A was the designation for Old Worton Road, which ran 0.17 miles (0.27 km) from MD 297 north to MD 298 in Butlertown. The route was assigned after MD 297 was relocated at its intersection with MD 298 in 1973. MD 297A was transferred from state to county maintenance through a June 1, 1993, road transfer agreement.
