= Sassafras, Maryland =

Unincorporated community in Maryland, U.S.

Coordinates: 39°22′22″N 75°48′7.2″W

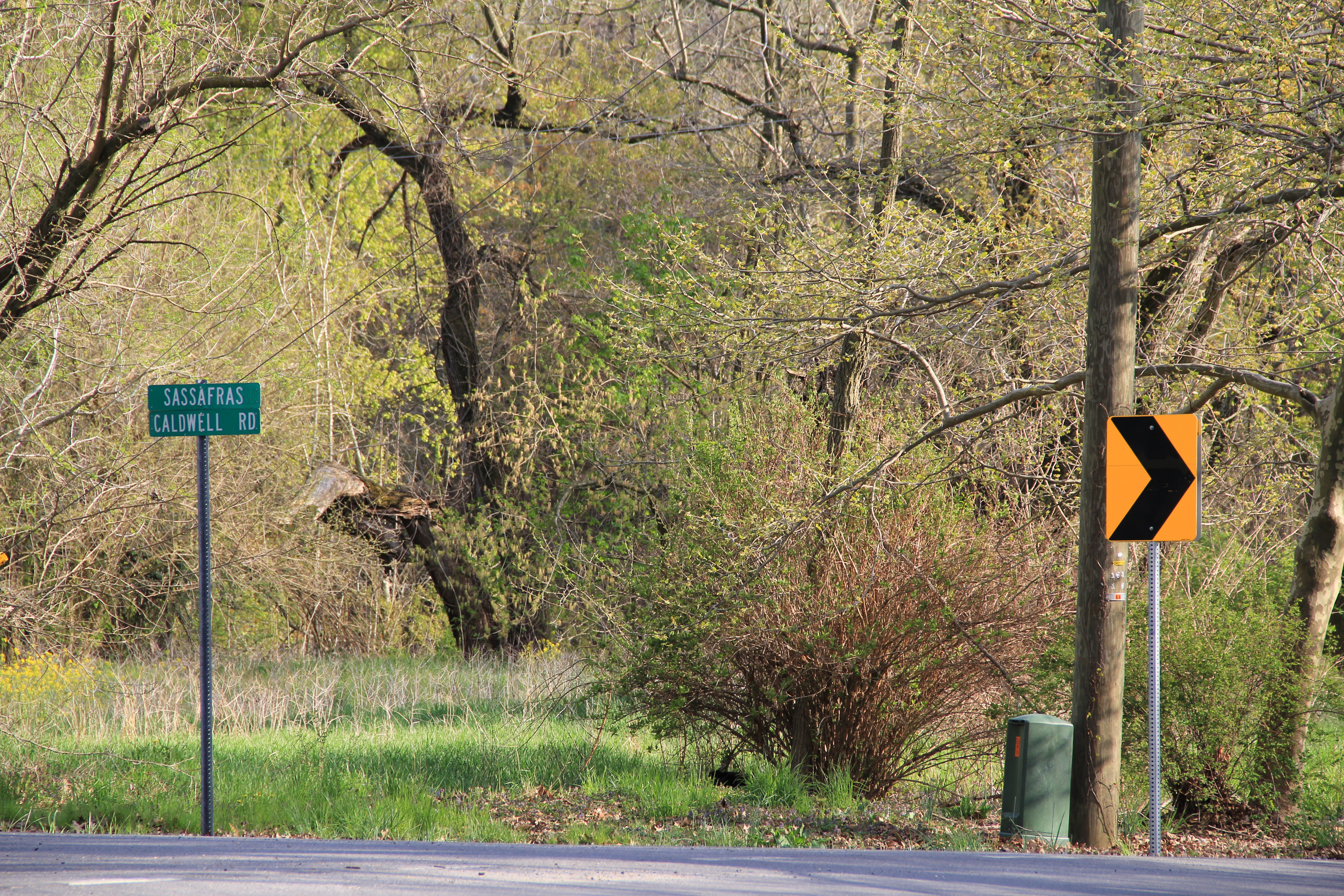
Sassafras and Caldwell Road - Sassafras Maryland

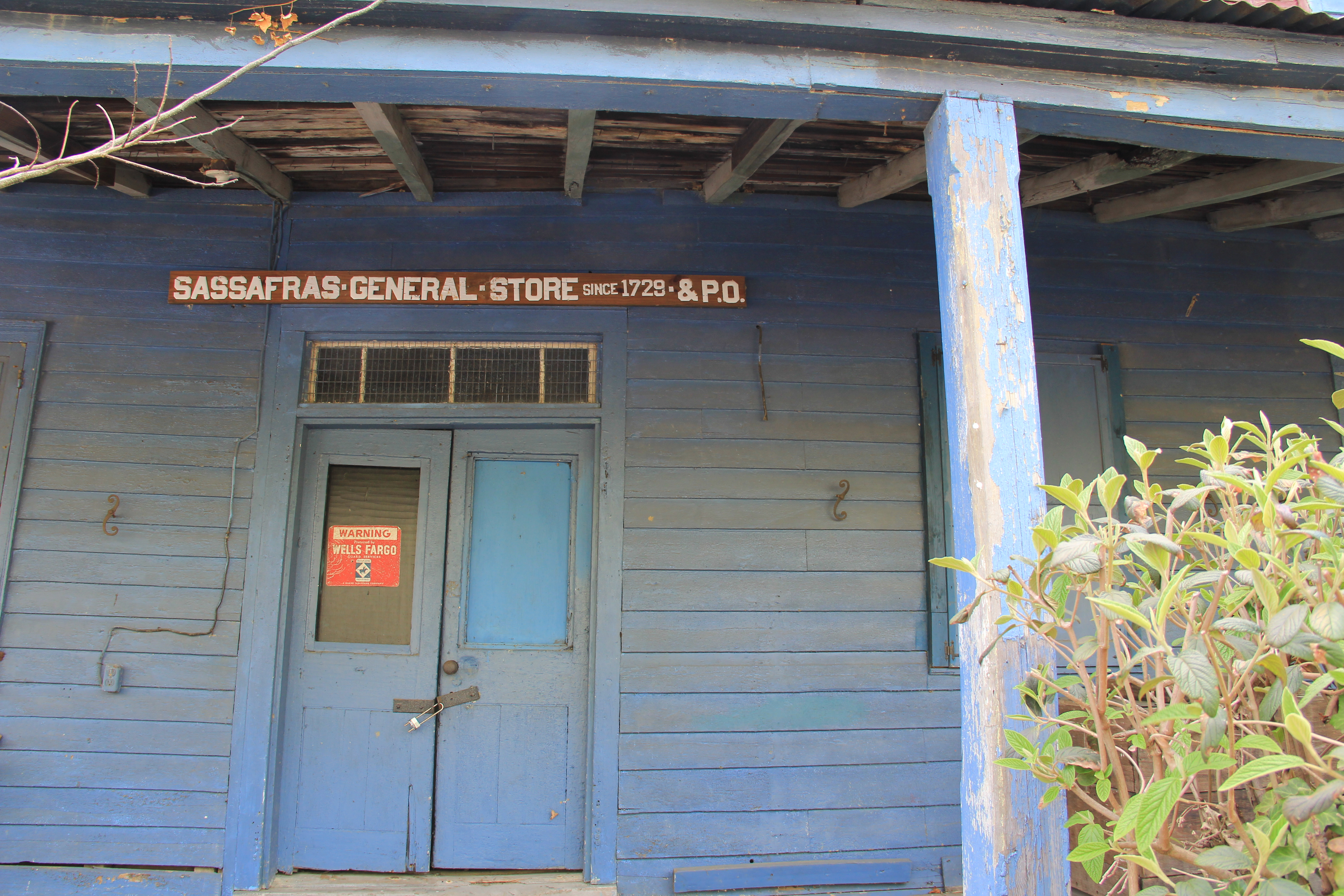
Sassafrass General Store sign

Sassafras is an unincorporated community in Kent County, Maryland, United States. The Lanthim House, built in the 1720s, served as a general store.

Nearby Rich Hill was listed on the National Register of Historic Places in 1972.

== Education ==
It is in the Kent County Public Schools. Kent County Middle School is in Chestertown, and Kent County High School is in an unincorporated area, in the Butlertown CDP with a Worton postal address.

The community was formerly assigned to Millington Elementary School. In 2017 the school board voted to close Millington Elementary School.
