= WKHS =

Semi-satellite of WXPN, Philadelphia
- Worton, Maryland; United States
- Broadcast area: Eastern Shore of Maryland; New Castle County, Delaware; Kent County, Delaware
- Frequency: 90.5 MHz

Programming
- Format: Campus radio; adult album alternative

Ownership
- Owner: Kent County Public Schools; (Board of Education of Kent County)

History
- First air date: March 28, 1974
- Call sign meaning: Kent County High School

Technical information
- Licensing authority: FCC
- Facility ID: 6057
- Class: B1
- ERP: 17,500 watts
- HAAT: 66 meters (217 ft)
- Transmitter coordinates: 39°16′55.3″N 76°5′24.8″W

Links
- Public license information: Public file; LMS
- Website: www.wkhsradio.org

WKHS (90.5 FM) is a non-commercial educational radio station licensed to serve Worton, Maryland. The station is owned by Kent County Public Schools (with the broadcast license held by the Board of Education of Kent County, Maryland), and is staffed by students of Kent County High School while school is in session and community volunteers during evening hours. The station simulcasts the programming of WXPN (licensed to serve Philadelphia, Pennsylvania) during overnight hours, on weekends and during the summer.

WKHS celebrated 50 years on the air on March 28, 2024.
