= Maryland Route 330 =

Highway in Maryland

Maryland Route 330
- Maryland Line Road
- Maryland Route 330 highlighted in red

Route information
- Maintained by MDSHA
- Length: 3.72 mi (5.99 km)
- Existed: July 1988–present

Major junctions
- West end: MD 299 / MD 313 at Massey
- East end: Clayton Delaney Road at the Delaware state line near Massey

Location
- Country: United States
- State: Maryland
- Counties: Kent

Highway system
- Maryland highway system; Interstate; US; State; Scenic Byways
← MD 329	→ MD 331

Maryland Route 330 (MD 330) is a state highway in the U.S. state of Maryland. Known as Maryland Line Road, the highway runs 3.72 miles (5.99 km) from MD 299 and MD 313 at Massey east to the Delaware state line in eastern Kent County, where the highway continues as Clayton Delaney Road. Maryland Line Road was improved in 1954 but was not brought into the state highway system and designated MD 330 until the late 1980s.

== Route description ==
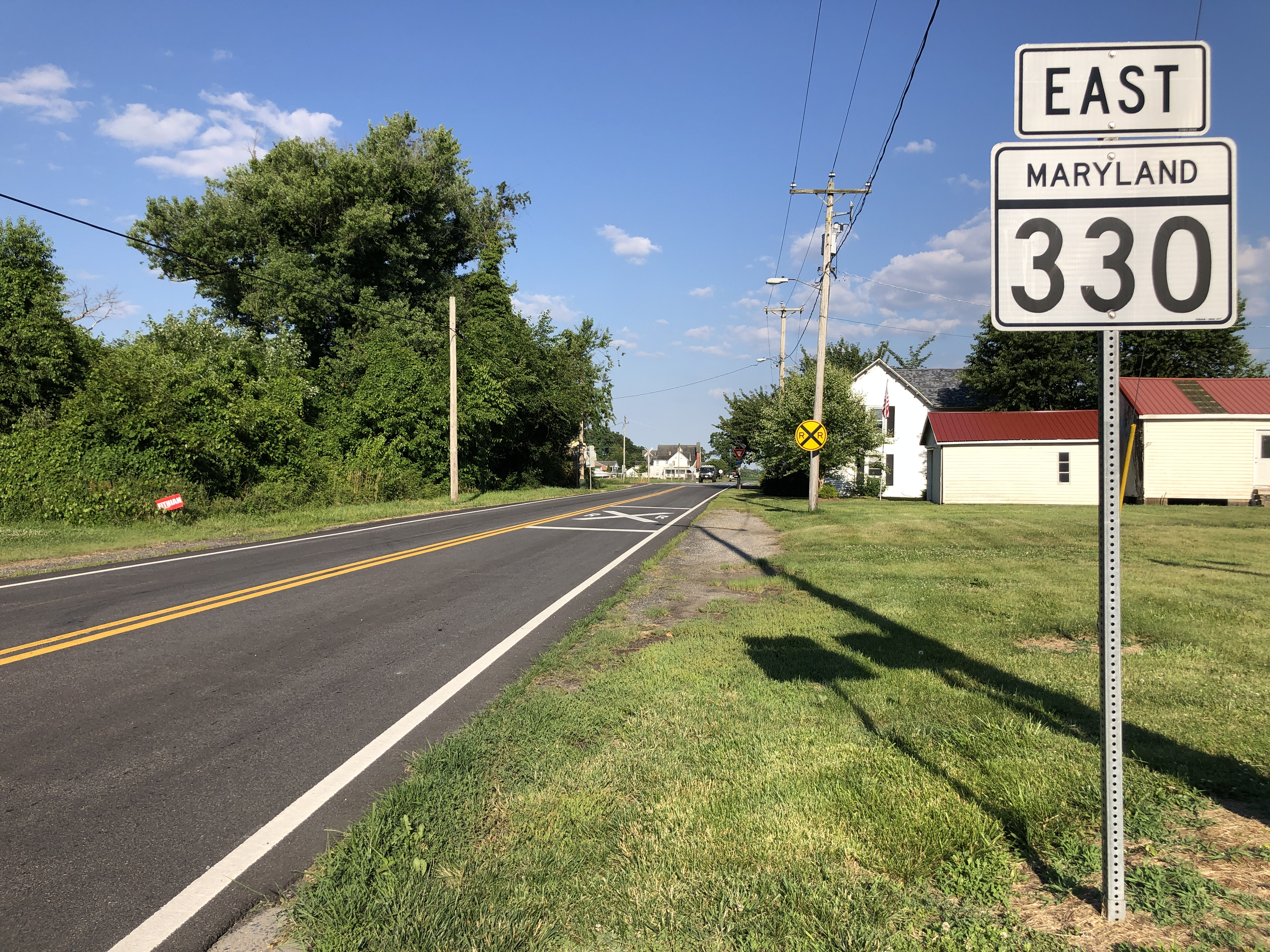
View east along MD 330 at MD 299 and MD 313 in Massey

MD 330 begins at a four-way intersection with MD 299 and MD 313 at Massey. MD 299 heads north as Massey Road toward Sassafras, and MD 313 heads west (northbound) and south as Galena Road. MD 330 heads east as a two-lane undivided road that immediately has a grade crossing of the Centreville Branch of the Northern Line of the Maryland and Delaware Railroad just south of the junction of the Centreville and Chestertown branches of the Northern Line. The highway passes north of the Massey Aerodrome and Massey Air Museum before it runs through the Millington Wildlife Management Area. MD 330 crosses Black Bottom Branch before it reaches its eastern terminus at the Delaware state line, where the road continues east as Clayton Delaney Road in the southwest corner of New Castle County.

== History ==
The Maryland State Roads Commission reconstructed Maryland Line Road as a gravel road from the railroad crossing with the Pennsylvania Railroad (now Maryland and Delaware Railroad) to the state line in 1954; however, they decided to leave the highway in the county highway system. The whole length of the highway was brought into the state highway system through a December 1, 1987, road transfer agreement. The highway was designated MD 330 in July 1988.

== Junction list ==
The entire route is in Kent County.

Location	mi	km	Destinations	Notes
Massey	0.00	0.00	MD 299 north (Massey Road) / MD 313 (Galena Road) – Galena, Millington, Sassafras	Western terminus; southern terminus of MD 299
	3.72	5.99	Clayton Delaney Road east	Delaware state line; eastern terminus
1.000 mi = 1.609 km; 1.000 km = 0.621 mi
