= Lynch, Maryland =

- Unincorporated community
- Location within Maryland
- Coordinates: 39°17′43″N 76°03′46″W
- Country: United States
- State: Maryland
- County: Kent
- Elevation: 75 ft (23 m)
- Time zone: UTC-5 (Eastern (EST))
  - Summer (DST): UTC-4 (EDT)
- ZIP code: 21678
- Area codes: 410, 443, and 667
- GNIS feature ID: 590713

Lynch is an unincorporated community in Kent County, Maryland, United States. Lynch is located along Maryland Route 561 at the crossing of the Maryland and Delaware Railroad, north of Chestertown.

== Education ==
It is in the Kent County Public Schools. Kent County Middle School is in Chestertown, and Kent County High School is in an unincorporated area, in the Butlertown census-designated place with a Worton postal address.

The community was formerly assigned to Worton Elementary School. In 2017 the school board voted to close Worton Elementary. The boundary of Garnet Elementary School in Chestertown was adjusted.
