= WKHS (disambiguation) =

WKHS (90.5 FM) is a non-commercial educational FM radio station licensed to serve Worton, Maryland.

WKHS may also refer to:

- Waterford Kettering High School, Waterford, Michigan, United States
- White Knoll High School, Lexington, South Carolina, United States
- Worthington Kilbourne High School, Columbus, Ohio, United States
- Workhorse Group (NASDAQ: WKHS), an American manufacturing company
