= Hassengers Corner, Maryland =

Unincorporated community in Maryland, U.S.

Coordinates: 39°15′57″N 76°02′50″W

Hassengers Corner is an unincorporated community at the intersection of Maryland Route 213 and Maryland Route 561 in Kent County, Maryland, United States.
