= Kennedyville, Maryland =

- Census-designated place
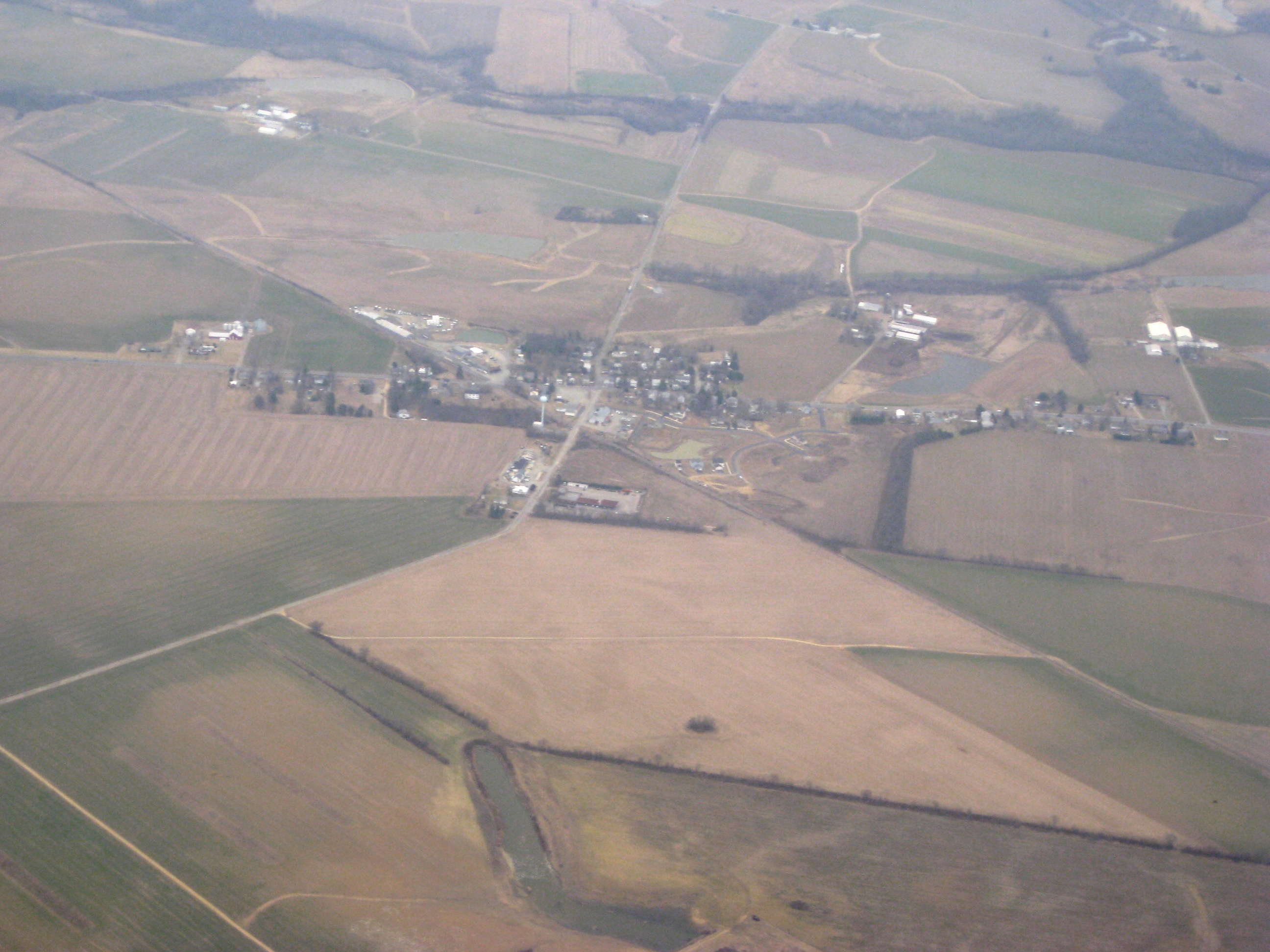
- Aerial image of Kennedyville

- Location within Maryland Location within the United States
- Coordinates: 39°18′19″N 75°59′42″W
- Country: United States
- State: Maryland
- County: Kent

Area
  - Total: 0.52 sq mi (1.34 km^{2})
  - Land: 0.51 sq mi (1.32 km^{2})
  - Water: 0.0077 sq mi (0.02 km^{2})
- Elevation: 69 ft (21 m)

Population (2020)
  - Total: 230
  - Density: 450.0/sq mi (173.74/km^{2})
- Time zone: UTC-5 (Eastern (EST))
  - Summer (DST): UTC-4 (EDT)
- ZIP code: 21645
- Area codes: 410, 443, and 667
- GNIS feature ID: 590588
- FIPS code: 24-43475

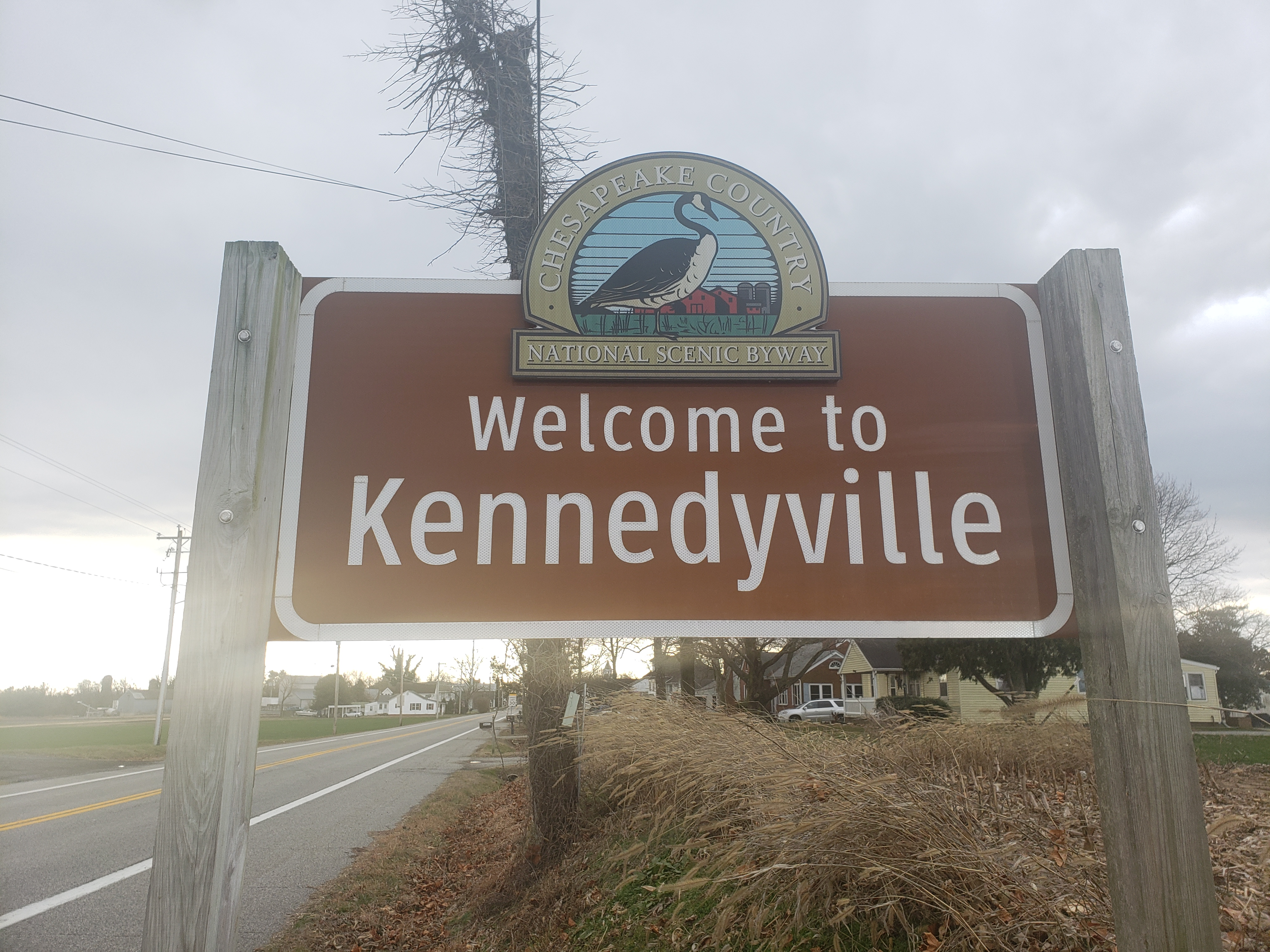
Kennedyville Welcome Sign

Kennedyville is an unincorporated community and census-designated place in Kent County, Maryland, United States. As of the 2010 census it had a population of 199.

Knocks Folly, Shrewsbury Church, and Woodland Hall are listed on the National Register of Historic Places.

== Geography ==
Kennedyville is in eastern Kent County, 7 miles (11 km) northeast of Chestertown, the county seat, and the same distance southwest of Galena, along Maryland Route 213. According to the U.S. Census Bureau, the CDP has a total area of 0.6 square miles (1.5 km^{2}), of which 0.01 square miles (0.02 km^{2}), or 1.15%, are water. The community is drained by tributaries of Morgan Creek, a south-flowing tributary of the Chester River.

== Demographics ==
Historical population
Census	Pop.	Note	%±
2020	230		—
U.S. Decennial Census

== Education ==
It is in the Kent County Public Schools. Kent County Middle School is in Chestertown, and Kent County High School is in an unincorporated area, in the Butlertown census-designated place with a Worton postal address.

The community was formerly assigned to Worton Elementary School. In 2017 the school board voted to close Worton Elementary.

== Notable people ==
- Wayne Gilchrest, former congressman from the first district of Maryland
- John Needles (1786 – 1878), Quaker abolitionist and a master craftsman of fine furniture
