= Woodland Hall =

Historic house in Maryland, United States

- U.S. National Register of Historic Places
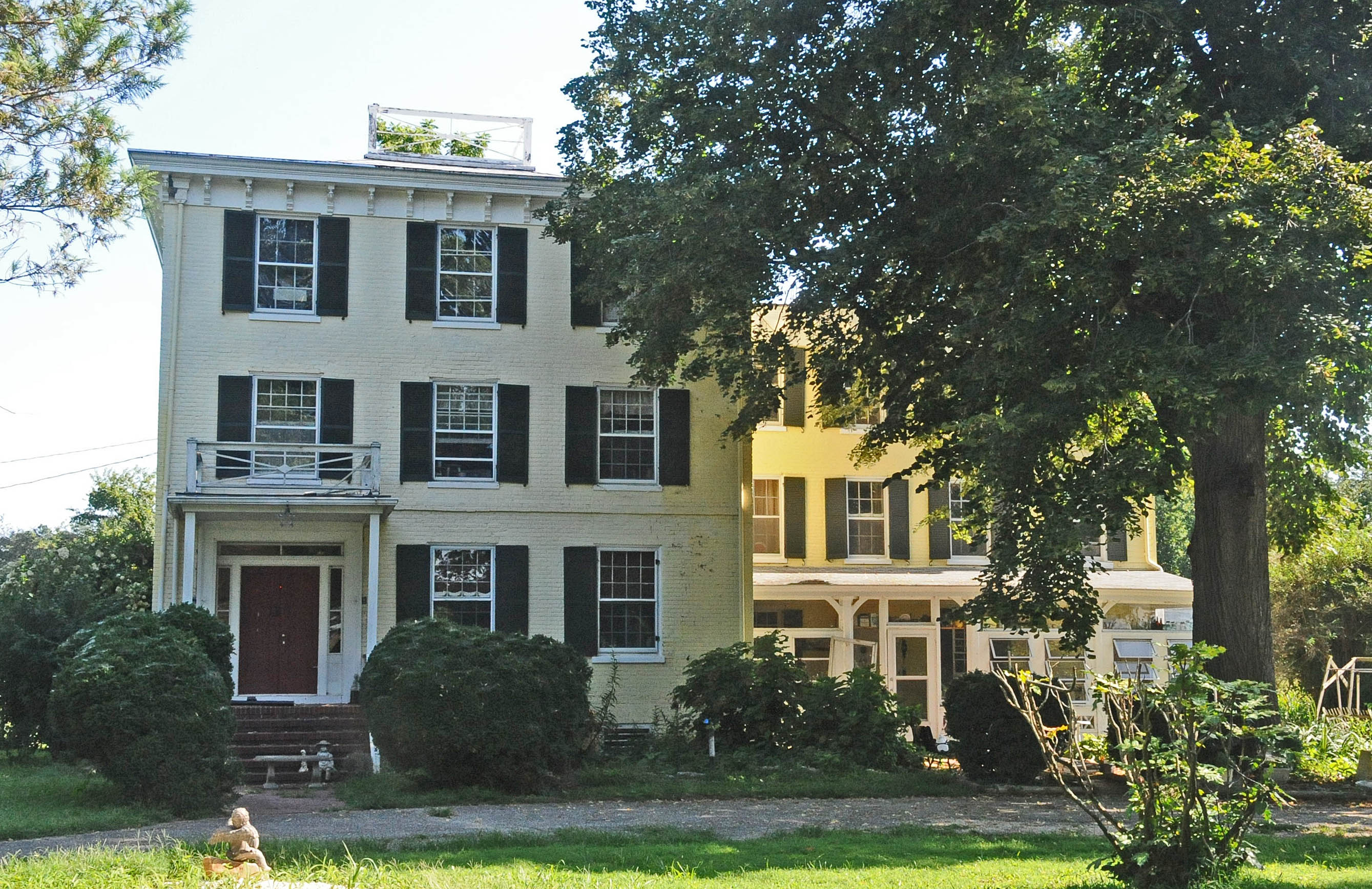

- Location within Maryland Location within the United States
- Location: 13111 Shallcross Wharf Rd., near Kennedyville, Maryland
- Coordinates: 39°20′10″N 75°56′38″W
- NRHP reference No.: 07001287
- Added to NRHP: December 10, 2008

Woodland Hall is a historic home located near Kennedyville, Kent County, Maryland.

It was listed on the National Register of Historic Places in 2008.
