= Knocks Folly =

Historic house in Maryland, United States

- U.S. National Register of Historic Places
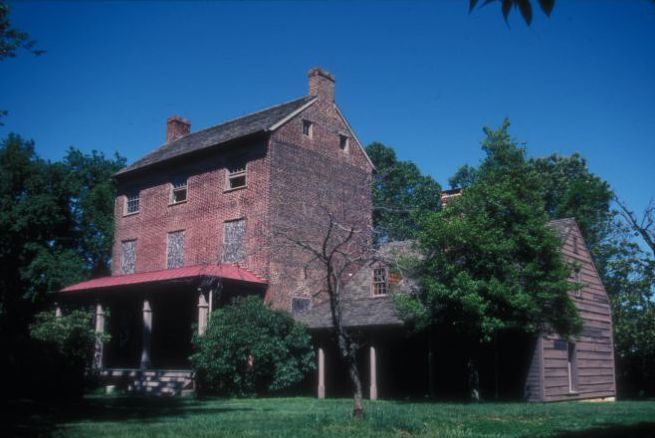

- Location within Maryland Location within the United States
- Nearest city: Kennedyville, Maryland
- Coordinates: 39°21′6″N 75°59′4″W
- Built: 1753
- Architectural style: Federal
- NRHP reference No.: 76001006
- Added to NRHP: June 17, 1976

Knocks Folly, also known as Janvier House and Barroll House, is a historic home located at Kennedyville, Kent County, Maryland, United States. It is an unusual combination of a small, 1 1/2-story, mid-18th-century log home with a three-story, Federal brick wing.

Knocks Folly was listed on the National Register of Historic Places in 1976.
