= John Needles =

American abolitionist (1786-1878)

- Born: October 4, 1786; Talbot County; Maryland, U.S.
- Died: July 19, 1878 (aged 91); Kent County; Maryland, U.S.
- Occupation: Cabinetmaker
- Spouses: Eliza Matthews; Lydia Smith; Mary Ann Bowers

John Needles (1786–1878) was an active Quaker and noted Maryland abolitionist. He was also a master craftsman of fine furniture.

== Early life ==
Needles was born on October 4, 1786, to Edward and Mary (Lamb) Needles. They lived on a farm in the small community of High Banks that borders the Choptank River and is located about eight miles east of Easton, Talbot County, Maryland. After his father died in 1798, John Needles lived with Pearce Lamb, his maternal grandfather, at Lamb's Meadows, a farm that is located near Kennedyville, Kent County, Maryland. In 1803, Needles, at the age of 16, moved to Easton, where he began a five-year apprenticeship with cabinetmaker James Neall.

== Eliza Matthews ==
After completing his apprenticeship in 1808, Needles removed for six months to Wakefield, a 133-acre farm belonging to his friend Joseph Bartlett. Wakefield is located between Easton and St. Michaels on Dixon Creek. In his autobiography, John Needles reveals the events that culminate in his marriage. Joseph Bartlett informed him that his future wife, Rhoda Matthews, has a younger sister, Eliza, who is unmarried and, in Joseph's opinion, is "worth one thousand Pounds". On June 22, 1809, Needles attends the wedding of Joseph Bartlett and Rhoda Matthews but Eliza is not present because she had entered Westtown School, a Quaker boarding school. John Needles continues, "I had a desire to see her and in the course of time I did see her and was not disappointed in what I had been told."

On May 29, 1811, John Needles and Eliza Matthews (1793-1840), daughter of Mordecai and Ruth (Hussey) Matthews, were married by Quaker ceremony in Gunpowder Meetinghouse, Beaver Dam Road, Cockeysville, Baltimore County, Maryland.

== Baltimore City ==
In October 1808, Needles removed to Baltimore, Maryland, where he was employed by Edward Priestley, a renowned cabinetmaker. Later, Needles was employed by William Camp until March 1810, when he removed to 10 Hanover Street, where his residence and first shop were located.

By 1812, John and Eliza Needles had removed to 54 Hanover Street, where their new residence and shop were located.

== Bibliography ==
- Earle, Swepson (editor). Maryland's colonial Eastern Shore. New York: Weathervane Books, pp. 19–20
- Byrd, Dana E. (2005). The paradox of good intentions: John Needles, cabinetmaker in antebellum Baltimore. University of Delaware, 200 pages
- Jones, Christopher H. (2007). "'Many Were Set at Liberty': John Needles, Abolitionist and Artisan", Maryland Historical Magazine, 102 (3): 156–75
- Kirtley, Alexandra Alevizatos (2001). "A New Suspect: Baltimore Cabinetmaker Edward Priestley". American Furniture 2000, Milwaukee: Chipstone Foundation, pp. 100–51
- Leonard, R. Bernice (1984). Twig and turf II: Bartlett and allied families, 1693-1984. St. Michaels, Maryland: R. B. Leonard, 330 pages
- Needles, Samuel Hambleton (1876). Record of the Man, Needles (Nedels) and Hambleton families; . . . Philadelphia, Pennsylvania: Edmund Deacon
- Smedley, Susanna (1945). Catalog of Westtown through the years, officers, students, and others. Philadelphia: Lyon & Armor
- Still, William (1872). Earnest in the cause; John Needles. Philadelphia: Porter & Coates
- Wright, Edward Needles (editor) (1969). "John Needles (1786-1878): An Autobiography". Quaker History, The Bulletin of Friends Historical Association, 58 (1): 3–21. Retrieved 8 February 2017.
