= Hopeful Unity =

Historic house in Maryland, United States

- U.S. National Register of Historic Places
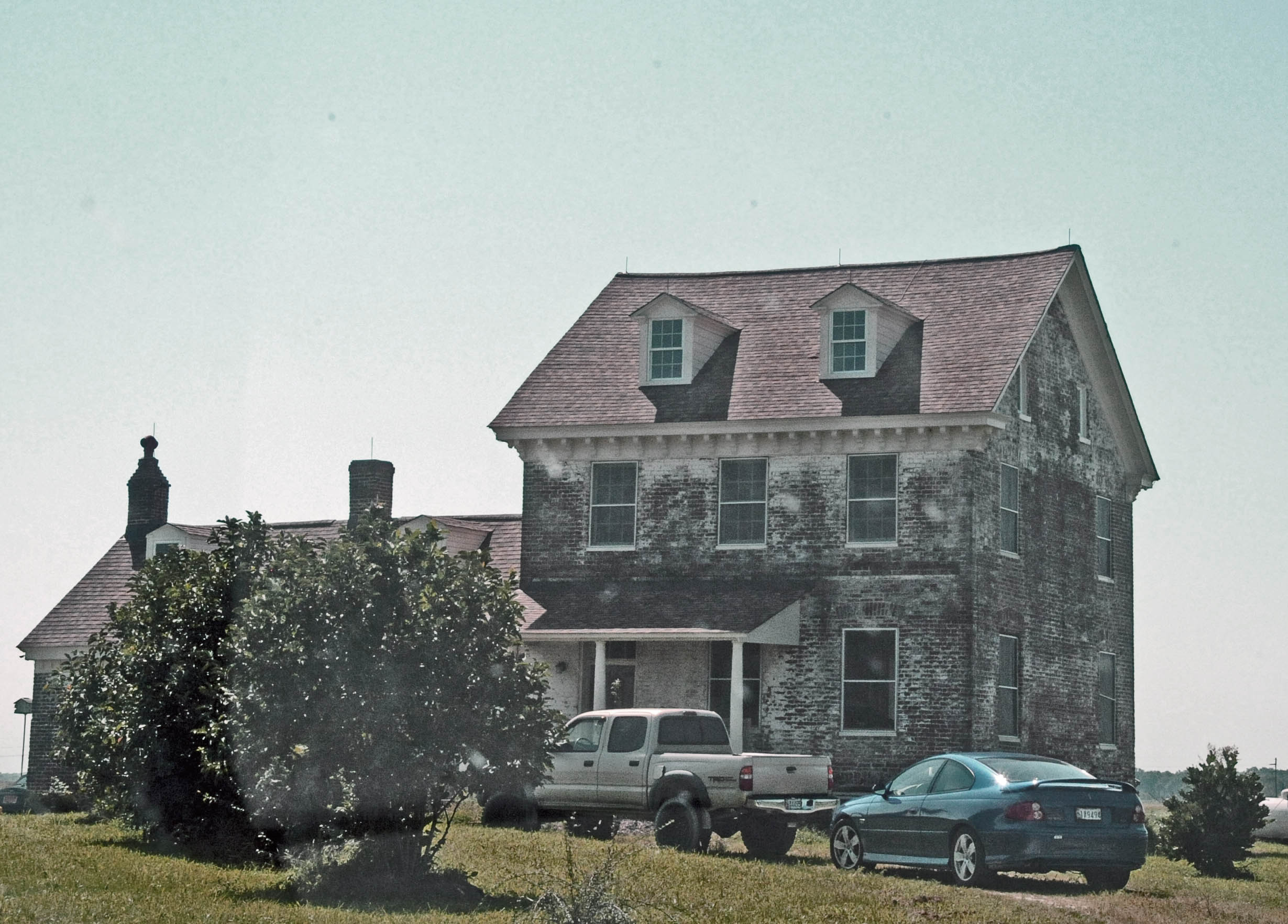

- Location within Maryland Location within the United States
- Location: 25789 Lambs Meadow Rd., Worton, Maryland
- Coordinates: 39°17′38″N 76°4′29″W
- Built: 1761
- NRHP reference No.: 15000526
- Added to NRHP: August 18, 2015

Hopeful Unity is a historic house at 25789 Lambs Meadow Road in Worton, Maryland. It is a three-story brick building, three bays wide, with a 1 1/2-story kitchen ell. The main house is generally believed to have been built about 1761, after the property was purchased by Charles Groome. The ell may encapsulate an even older structure. The house is a well-preserved example of colonial Eastern Shore architecture.

The house was listed on the National Register of Historic Places in 2015.

== See also ==
- National Register of Historic Places listings in Kent County, Maryland
