= Shrewsbury Church =

Historic church in Maryland, United States

- U.S. National Register of Historic Places
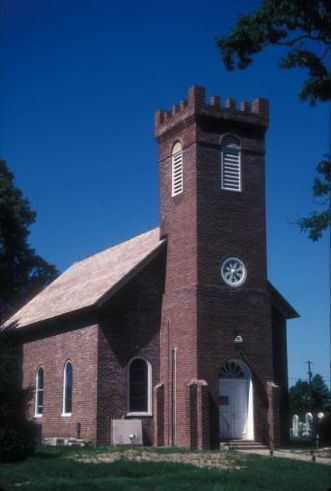

- Location within Maryland Location within the United States
- Nearest city: Kennedyville, Maryland
- Coordinates: 39°19′44″N 75°58′3″W
- Built: 1834
- Architectural style: Gothic Revival, Vernacular Gothic
- NRHP reference No.: 86001245
- Added to NRHP: June 04, 1986

Shrewsbury Church is a historic Episcopal church located at Kennedyville, Kent County, Maryland, United States. It is a rural parish church constructed in 1834, and remodeled to its present vernacular Gothic-influenced appearance in 1890. The church is constructed of brick and features a three-stage buttressed and crenelated tower at the entrance, a low one-story chancel, and Gothic influenced walnut furnishings. South Sassafras Parish, as it was originally known, was one of the original 30 Anglican parishes in the Province of Maryland. Buried in the churchyard is John Cadwalader, a general of the American Revolutionary War.

Shrewsbury Church was listed on the National Register of Historic Places in 1986.
