= Kent County Public Schools =

School district in Rock Hall, Maryland

Kent County Public Schools (KCPS) is a school district headquartered in Rock Hall, Maryland. It operates public schools in Kent County, where it is the sole school district. Dr. Mary Boswell-McComas was appointed following ratification by the Kent County Board of Education on June 10, 2024.

The district remains the smallest in Maryland with around 1,690 students enrolled in 2025. Maryland State Department of Education enrollment records for 2024 show KCPS ranks 24th in student enrollment among the 24 public school systems in Maryland.

In 2002 Bonnie Ward became the superintendent of the school district.

Superintendent Karen Couch established a pre-kindergarten program for all families in the county. In 2021 she was awarded the 2021 Maryland Superintendent of the Year award by the Public School Superintendents’ Association of Maryland.

Kent County High School Principal Kris Hemstetter was awarded Principal of the Year by the Maryland Association of Secondary School Principals (MASSP) in June 2025.

From circa 1997 to 2017 student enrollment declined, leading to a decline in funding and the board considering closing two elementary schools. The Kent County Commissioners, School Board and other parties are currently debating and advocating for a revised cost-share formula to support construction of a new middle school to replace the current building in Chestertown.

WKHS has broadcast from the high school since 1974 and marked 50 years of broadcasting in 2024. It is a WXPN affiliate and regarded as one the most powerful high school stations in the country.

== Governance ==
Board members include:

- Trish McGee, President (Term ends Dec. 31, 2026)
- Aretha Dorsey (Term ends Dec. 31, 2026)
- Frank Rhodes (Term ends Dec. 31, 2026)
- Laura McKenzie, Vice President (Term ends Dec. 31, 2028)
- John Queen, (Term ends Dec. 31, 2028)

The district includes a non-voting student on the school board, currently Alden Swanson, whose term ends in June 2025.

The district headquarters is in Rock Hall. The district headquarters was previously in Chestertown.

== Schools ==
Secondary

- Kent County High School (unincorporated area, Butlertown census-designated place, Worton postal address)
  - It opened in 1971 as a merger of three high schools. It is in the center of Kent County.
- Kent County Middle School (Chestertown)

Elementary

- Galena Elementary School (Galena)
- Henry Highland Garnett Elementary School (Chestertown) - As of 2021 it had about 264 students.
- Rock Hall Elementary School (Rock Hall)

=== Former schools ===
Former high schools

- H. H. Garnett High, the county's school for African Americans during segregation
- Chestertown High School - It moved from its original 1915 building in 1953. Its second building was built in 1946. Chestertown High School closed in 1971 when it consolidated with Kent County High, and the building became Chestertown Middle School. The building is now Kent County Middle School.
- Galena High School - In 1921 it began in a wooden building. The brick building was constructed in 1949. The high school consolidated into Kent County High in 1971, and building became Galena Middle School. The building is now (as of 2021) Galena Elementary School.
- Rock Hall High School - The building was constructed in 1949. The high school consolidated into Kent County High in 1971, and building became Rock Hall Middle School. It is now (as of 2021) Rock Hall Elementary School.

Former middle schools

- Chestertown Middle School
  - The building was constructed in 1946. The middle school opened in the former Chestertown High in 1971. A renovation was done in 1975. The building is now Kent County Middle School.
- Galena Middle School
  - The building was constructed in 1949. The middle school opened in the former Galena High in 1971. An addition was built in 1974. The building is now (as of 2021) Galena Elementary School.
- Rock Hall Middle School
  - The building was constructed in 1949. The middle school opened in the former Rock Hall High in 1971. It is now (as of 2021) Rock Hall Elementary School.

All three middle schools consolidated into Kent County Middle in Chestertown in 2010.

Former elementary schools

- Millington Elementary School (Millington)
  - In addition to Millington its attendance boundary included Chesterville, Galena, Georgetown, Golts, Massey, and Sassafras.
- Worton Elementary School (Butlertown CDP), Worton postal address
  - In addition to Worton its attendance boundary included Betterton, Kennedyville, Lynch, Melitota, and Still Pond.

In 2016 four members favored and one was against closing the two schools. In 2017 the vote to close was unanimous. Garnet Elementary School's boundary was to be adjusted. In 2019 there were discussions about possibly reopening Millington Elementary.

== Facilities ==
The current district headquarters, in Rock Hall, is the former Rock Hall Elementary School.

The former school district headquarters, on about 4 acres (1.6 ha) of land, opened in September 1015 as Chestertown High School. An addition was made in 1953, when it was converted into an elementary school. The facility became the headquarters of the Kent County school district in 1973. It closed in 2010. The following year the school district gave the building to the Kent County Commissioners as the school district decided it no longer needed the building. Washington College purchased the property and razed the building in June 2015.
