= Valley Cottage (Georgetown, Maryland) =

Historic house in Maryland, United States

- U.S. National Register of Historic Places
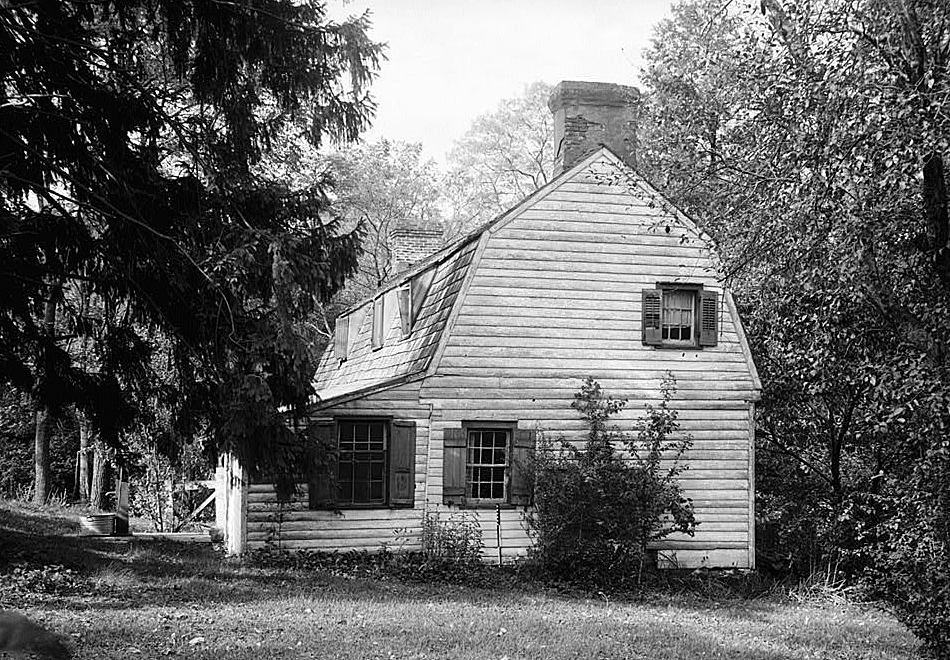
- Valley Cottage in 1936

- Location within Maryland Location within the United States
- Location: Princess Stop St., Georgetown, Maryland
- Coordinates: 39°21′37″N 75°52′51″W
- Architectural style: Vernacular
- NRHP reference No.: 83002955
- Added to NRHP: January 11, 1983

Valley Cottage, also known as Wallis House, is a historic home located at Georgetown, Kent County, Maryland, United States. It is a two-story gambrel roofed structure consisting of a 42 feet long 18th century portion with a 16 feet long extension built in 1954.

Valley Cottage was listed on the National Register of Historic Places in 1996.
