= Rich Hill (Sassafras, Maryland) =

Historic house in Maryland, United States

- U.S. National Register of Historic Places
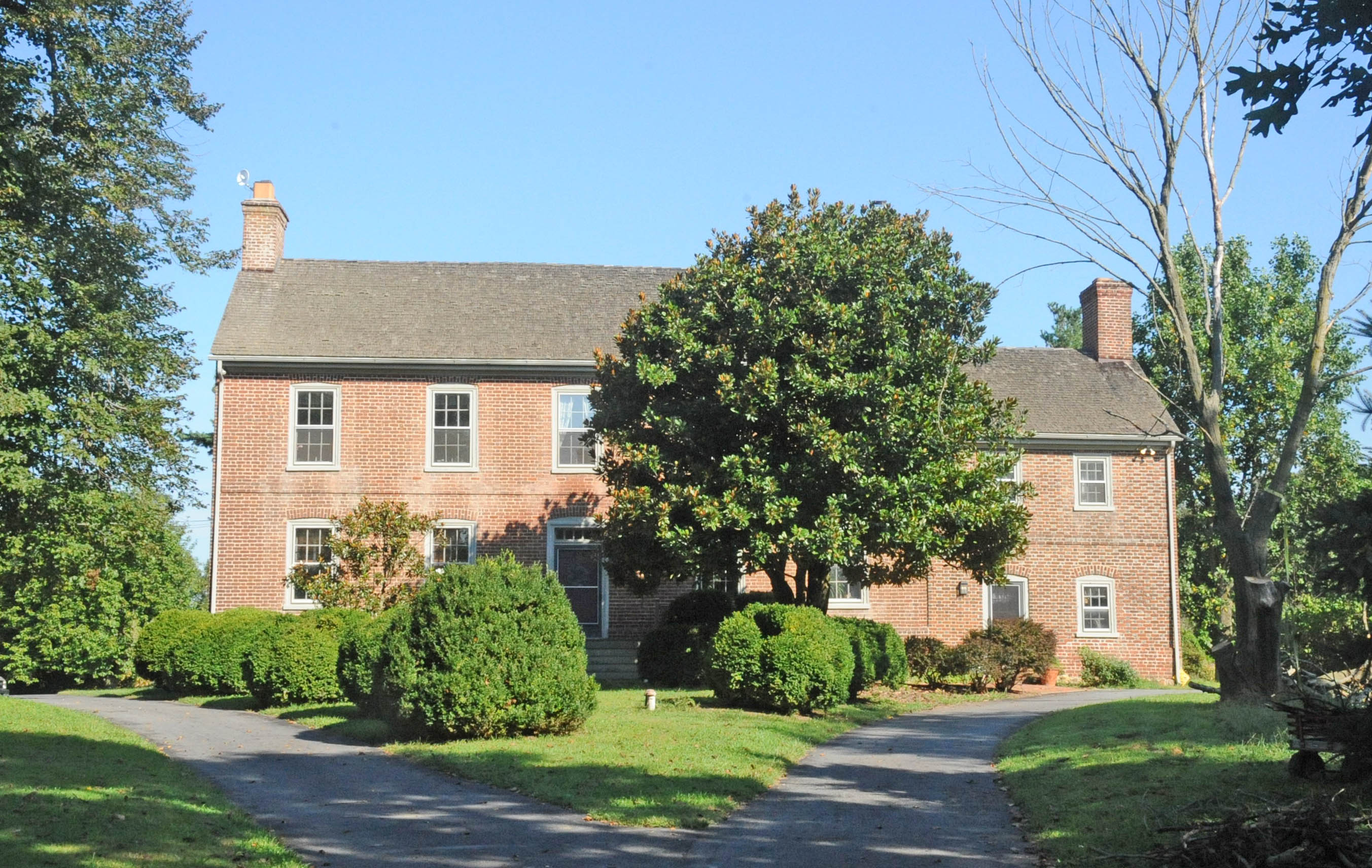

- Location within Maryland Location within the United States
- Location: MD 299, Sassafras, Maryland
- Coordinates: 39°22′7″N 75°48′27″W
- Built: 1753
- NRHP reference No.: 72000585
- Added to NRHP: December 15, 1972

Rich Hill, also known as The Adventure or Griffith House, is a historic home located at Sassafras, Kent County, Maryland, United States. It is a 5-bay, 2 1/2-story brick building with a two-story brick kitchen wing, built about 1753.

Rich Hill was listed on the National Register of Historic Places in 1972.
