= Christ Church, Graveyard and Sexton's House =

Historic church in Maryland, United States

- U.S. National Register of Historic Places
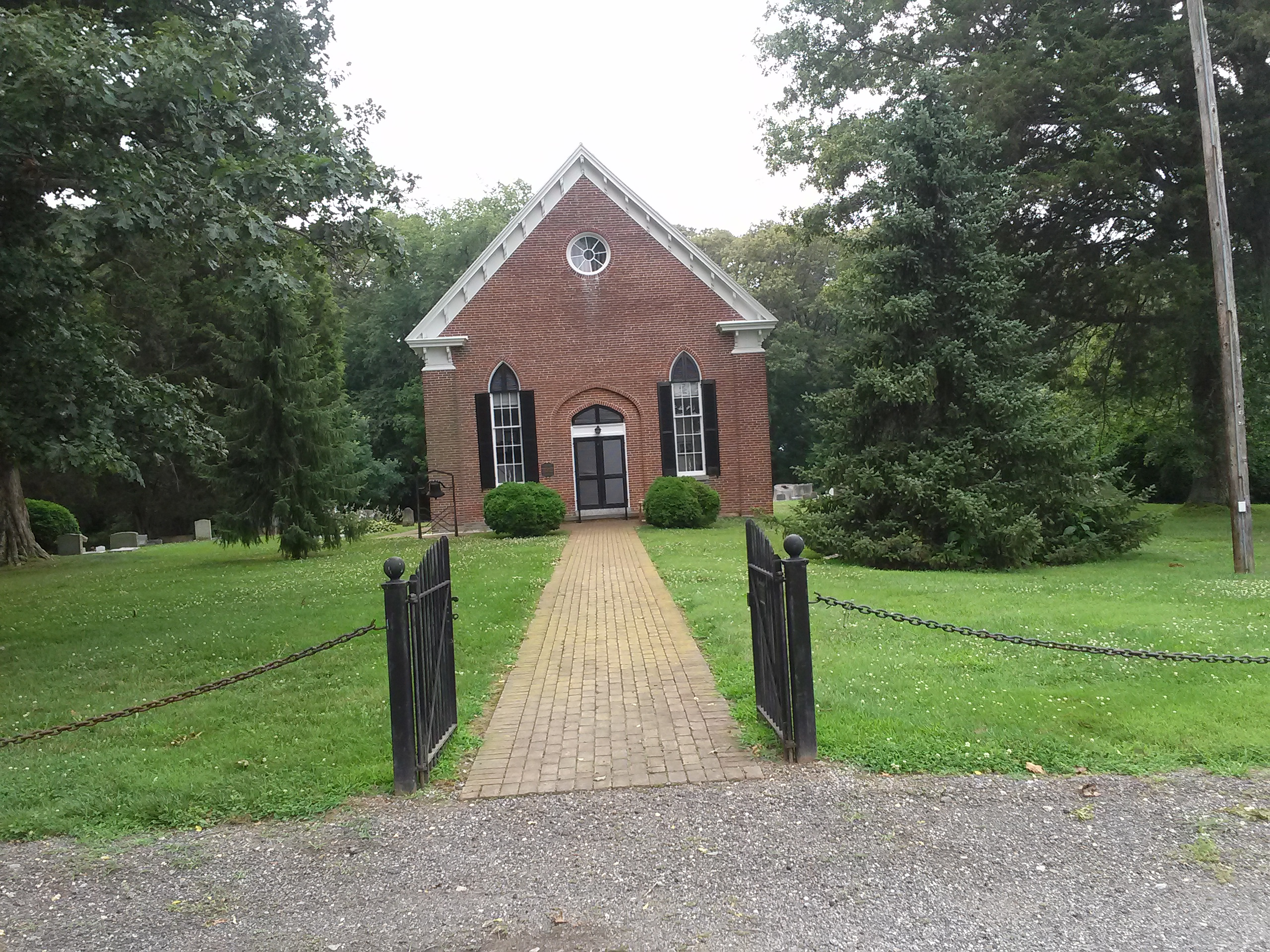
- Christ Church IU, Chester Parish, Worton, Maryland

- Location within Maryland Location within the United States
- Nearest city: Worton, Maryland
- Coordinates: 39°17′26″N 76°5′32″W
- Built: 1765
- Architectural style: Gothic Revival
- NRHP reference No.: 80001822
- Added to NRHP: April 02, 1980

Christ Church, Graveyard and Sexton's House is an historic Episcopal church complex located at Worton, Kent County, Maryland. The church, also known as Christ Church IU, is a small brick structure, basilican in plan, with a narrower sanctuary appended. It was built in 1765 (more likely 1845–1870) to serve as the parish church of Chester Parish which had been established that same year. It is a well-proportioned example of a small Gothic Revival structure interpreted in brick. The Sexton's house dates from the period of the earlier church and consists of two adjoining sections, one brick and one stone, both one story high with dormers.

It was listed on the National Register of Historic Places in 1980.

In 1835, the church sold part of its lands adjacent to the highway to the town's United Methodist church for its graveyard.

== See also ==
- List of post 1692 Anglican parishes in the Province of Maryland
