= Kent County High School =

High school in Worton, Maryland, US

Coordinates: 39.2851°N 76.0916°W

Location
- 25301 Lambs Meadow Rd; Worton, Maryland 21678; United States

Information
- School type: Public
- Established: 1971
- School district: Kent County Public Schools
- NCES School ID: 240045000768
- Principal: Kris Hemstetter
- Grades: 9-12
- Enrollment: 580
- Average class size: 13
- Colors: Blue and Gold
- Mascot: Trojans
- Website: https://www.kent.k12.md.us/KCHS.aspx

Kent County High School (KCHS) is a public school located in Worton, Maryland in Kent County. It is the only high school within Kent County, is part of the Kent County Public Schools district, and serves students from ninth through twelfth grades. Trojans are the school mascot and the school colors are blue and gold. The student body is 2/3 white.

== Overview ==
The school is located on the Eastern Shore of Maryland in the small rural town of Worton. The school campus is shared by Worton Elementary School, Kent County Community Center, and the Worton Regional Park. The property sits on the intersection of Maryland Route 297 and Maryland Route 298.

== History ==
The current high school building was constructed in the late 1960's, and opened to the first group of students in the fall of 1971. The old high school building now houses Kent County Middle School.

The high school was built to handle the growing student population from the former Chestertown, Rock Hall, Galena, and H. H. Garnett high schools. The high school was opened as the county's first, and one of the country's last, fully racially-integrated public schools—which was initiated following the ruling of Brown v. Board of Education. H. H. Garnett High, the school which served African Americans in Kent County, was closed and reconfigured to serve integrated elementary students residing in Chestertown. The three white high schools; Chestertown, Rock Hall, and Galena, were closed and reconfigured to serve integrated student populous of the middle school level (grades 5-8). To its students and staff, Kent County High School is a place of diverse education where CTE programs, community service organizations, and athletic and performing arts/band are offered.

It had championship football teams in 1989 and 1990.

Wayne Gilchrest taught at the school.

In 2021, Kris Hemstetter became principal. Dale Kevin Brown is a former principal at the school. He was succeeded by Joe Graf.

Alumnus basketball player JayShaun Freeman has been a leader on the Chesapeake College basketball team.

== Athletics ==
=== State championships ===
Football:

- Class 1A 1989, 1990

== Notable alumni ==
- Ryan Orlando Thompson, baseball player
- Manny Camper, basketball player

== See also ==
- Maryland Public Secondary Schools Athletic Association
