= Butlertown, Maryland =

- Census-designated place
- Location within Maryland Location within the United States
- Coordinates: 39°16′57″N 76°06′16″W
- Country: United States
- State: Maryland
- County: Kent

Area
  - Total: 0.83 sq mi (2.14 km^{2})
  - Land: 0.82 sq mi (2.12 km^{2})
  - Water: 0.0077 sq mi (0.02 km^{2})
- Elevation: 82 ft (25 m)

Population (2020)
  - Total: 520
  - Density: 635.4/sq mi (245.33/km^{2})
- Time zone: UTC−5 (Eastern (EST))
  - Summer (DST): UTC−4 (EDT)
- ZIP code: 21678
- Area codes: 410 & 443
- FIPS code: 24-11900
- GNIS feature ID: 589868

Butlertown is an unincorporated community and census-designated place in Kent County, Maryland, United States. Per the 2020 census, the population was 520.

== Demographics ==
Historical population
Census	Pop.	Note	%±
2010	505		—
2020	520		3.0%
U.S. Decennial Census; 2010 2020

=== 2020 census ===
Butlertown CDP, Maryland – Racial and ethnic composition Note: the US Census treats Hispanic/Latino as an ethnic category. This table excludes Latinos from the racial categories and assigns them to a separate category. Hispanics/Latinos may be of any race.
Race / Ethnicity (NH = Non-Hispanic)	Pop 2010	Pop 2020	% 2010	% 2020
White alone (NH)	188	182	37.23%	35.00%
Black or African American alone (NH)	292	279	57.82%	53.65%
Native American or Alaska Native alone (NH)	0	2	0.00%	0.38%
Asian alone (NH)	2	1	0.40%	0.19%
Pacific Islander alone (NH)	0	0	0.00%	0.00%
Some Other Race alone (NH)	3	4	0.59%	0.77%
Mixed Race/Multi-Racial (NH)	15	28	2.97%	5.38%
Hispanic or Latino (any race)	5	24	0.99%	4.62%
Total	505	520	100.00%	100.00%

== History ==
Formed sometime after 1877

== Education ==
Butlertown is in the Kent County Public Schools district.

Kent County High School is in the CDP although it has a Worton postal address. Kent County Middle School is in Chestertown.

Worton Elementary School was formerly in the CDP, with a Worton postal address. In 2017 the school board voted to close Worton Elementary School, with four members favoring and one against.
