= Worton, Maryland =

- Census-designated place
- Location within Maryland Location within the United States
- Coordinates: 39°16′28″N 76°05′32″W
- Country: United States
- State: Maryland
- County: Kent

Area
  - Total: 0.95 sq mi (2.45 km^{2})
  - Land: 0.92 sq mi (2.39 km^{2})
  - Water: 0.023 sq mi (0.06 km^{2})
- Elevation: 72 ft (22 m)

Population (2020)
  - Total: 214
  - Density: 231.9/sq mi (89.55/km^{2})
- Time zone: UTC−5 (Eastern (EST))
  - Summer (DST): UTC−4 (EDT)
- ZIP code: 21678
- Area codes: 410, 443, and 667
- GNIS feature ID: 591611
- FIPS code: 24-87000

Worton is an unincorporated community and census-designated place (CDP) in Kent County, Maryland, United States. As of the 2010 census it had a population of 249.

The Christ Church, Graveyard and Sexton's House complex was listed on the National Register of Historic Places in 1980.

== Geography ==
Worton is located along Maryland Route 297 at the crossing of the Maryland and Delaware Railroad, 4 miles (6 km) north of Chestertown, the Kent county seat. It is bordered to the north by Butlertown. According to the U.S. Census Bureau, the Worton CDP has an area of 0.93 square miles (2.4 km^{2}), of which 0.02 square miles (0.06 km^{2}), or 2.48%, is water.

== Demographics ==
Historical population
Census	Pop.	Note	%±
2020	214		—
U.S. Decennial Census

== Education ==
It is in the Kent County Public Schools. Kent County Middle School is in Chestertown, and Kent County High School is in an unincorporated area, in the Butlertown census-designated place with a Worton postal address.

Worton Elementary School was formerly in the Butlertown CDP, with a Worton postal address. In 2017 the school board voted to close Worton Elementary School, with four members favoring and one against.
