= Black Lady (disambiguation) =

Black Lady is an American card game.

Black Lady may also refer to:

- Black Maria (card game), a British game sometimes called Black Lady
- Black Lady (album), by Smak, 1978
- Black Lady, a form of the Sailor Moon character Chibiusa
- Black Lady of Bradley Woods, a ghost in England

== See also ==
- Lady in Black (disambiguation)
- Black people
