= The Woman in Black =

The Woman in Black may refer to:

- The Woman in Black (Hill novel), a 1983 gothic horror novel by Susan Hill
- The Woman in Black (play), a 1987 stage play based on the Hill novel
- The Woman in Black (1989 film), a television film based on the Hill novel
- The Woman in Black (2012 film), a film based on the Hill novel
- The Woman in Black: Angel of Death (2014 film), a sequel to the 2012 film
- The Woman in Black (1897), a play by H. Grattan Donnelly
  - The Woman in Black (1914 film), a silent film based on the 1897 play, directed by Lawrence Marston for Biograph Studios
- The Woman in Black, the American title of E. C. Bentley's 1913 detective novel, published in Britain as Trent's Last Case
- The Woman in Black, a 1933 novel by Herbert Adams
- The Woman in Black (Ford novel), a 1948 novel by Leslie Ford
- "Woman in Black" (Grimm), first-season finale of the television series Grimm
- Woman in Black (supernatural), a supernatural figure seen in Virginia and Tennessee in the early 1900s

== See also ==
- Women in Black, a women's anti-war movement
- The Women in Black, a 1993 novel by Madeleine St John
- Lady in Black (disambiguation)
