= Ezekiel F. Chambers =

American judge (1788–1867)

Ezekiel Forman Chambers
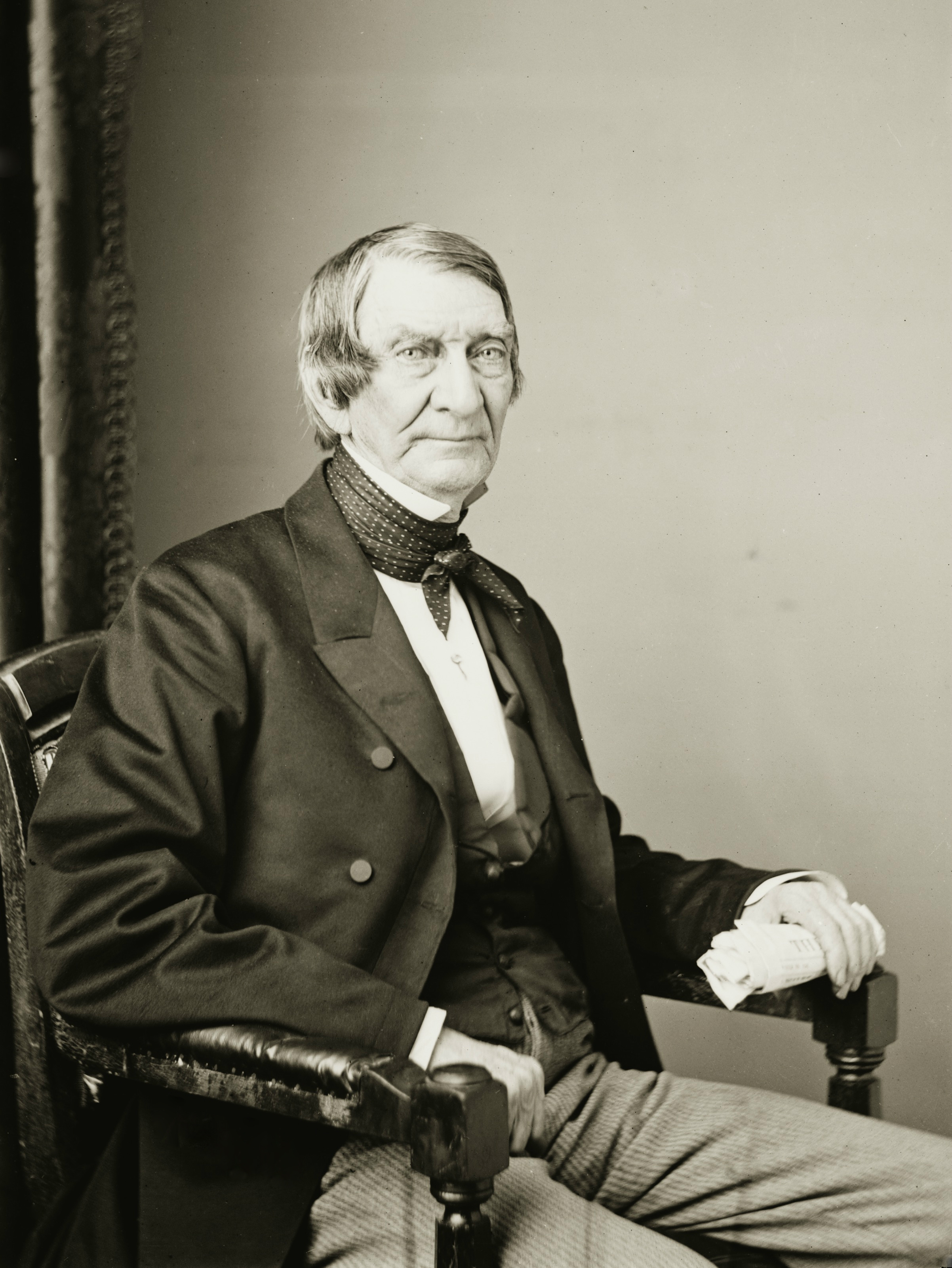

United States Senator from Maryland
- In office January 24, 1826 – December 20, 1834
- Preceded by: Edward Lloyd V
- Succeeded by: Robert Henry Goldsborough

Personal details
- Born: February 28, 1788 Chestertown, Maryland, U.S.
- Died: January 30, 1867 (aged 78) Chestertown, Maryland
- Party: National Republican
- Relatives: Zenith Jones Brown (granddaughter)

Ezekiel Forman Chambers (February 28, 1788 – January 30, 1867) was an American politician from Maryland.

== Biography ==
Born in Chestertown, Maryland, Chambers was graduated from Washington College at Chestertown in 1805. He studied law, was admitted to the bar in 1808, and commenced practice in Chestertown. Chambers served during the War of 1812 as a captain of militia, commanding a company at the Battle of Caulk's Field in 1814. He attained the rank of brigadier general of militia after the war. In 1822, Chambers served in the Maryland State Senate.

Chambers was elected to the United States Senate to fill the vacancy caused by the resignation of Edward Lloyd V. He was reelected in 1831 and served from January 24, 1826, until his own resignation on December 20, 1834. In the Senate, Chambers served as chairman of the Committee on the District of Columbia (Twenty-first through Twenty-third Congresses).

After his tenure in the Senate, Chambers served as presiding judge of the second judicial circuit of Maryland and judge of the Maryland Court of Appeals from 1834 to 1851, having been appointed to the seat vacated by the resignation of Richard Tilghman Earle. He was unsuccessful Democratic candidate for Governor of Maryland in 1864, and died in Chestertown in 1867. He was interred in Chester Cemetery.

Chambers was a slave owner. He owned the Wickes House in Chestertown.

His granddaughter was writer Zenith Jones Brown.

== See also ==
- Widehall (1769-1770), a mansion in Chestertown, Maryland. Chambers's home from 1822 to 1867.

Party political offices
Preceded by Benjamin Chew Howard	Democratic nominee for Governor of Maryland; 1864	Succeeded by Oden Bowie
U.S. Senate
Preceded by Edward Lloyd V	U.S. senator (Class 3) from Maryland; 1826–1834; Served alongside: Samuel Smith, Joseph Kent	Succeeded by Robert H. Goldsborough
