= Widehall =

Historic house in Maryland, United States

- U.S. National Register of Historic Places
- U.S. Historic district – Contributing property
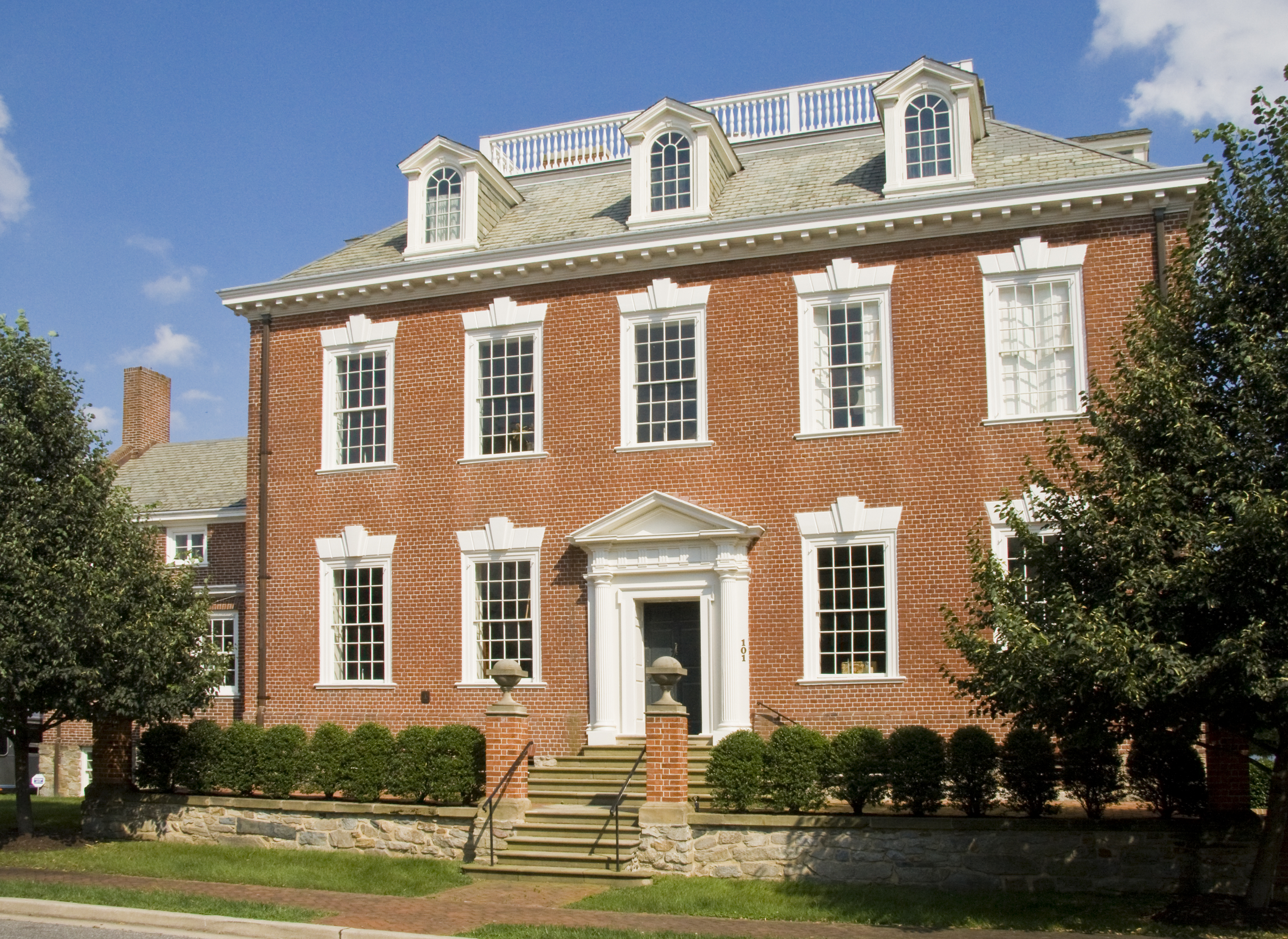
- Widehall, July 2009

- Location within Maryland Location within the United States
- Location: 101 N. Water St., Chestertown, Maryland
- Coordinates: 39°12′27″N 76°3′50″W
- Area: 1 acre (0.40 ha)
- Built: 1769–1770
- Architect: unknown
- Architectural style: Georgian
- Restored: 1910–1912
- Restored by: Howard Sill, architect
- Part of: Chestertown Historic District (ID70000263)
- NRHP reference No.: 72000584
- Added to NRHP: October 31, 1972

Widehall is a historic and architecturally significant house in Chestertown, Kent County, Maryland. Built by Thomas Smyth III, 1769–1770, it is a contributing property in the Chestertown Historic District.

== Description ==
Widehall is a large, brick, 2 1/2-story, middle-Georgian period, city house fronting on Water Street, with the Chester River waterfront behind it. It is 50 ft (15 m) wide and 41 ft (12 m) deep, and is approached by two short flights of sandstone steps, separated by a terrace. The house's high basement is screened by a claire-voie of four brick piers topped by sandstone ball-finials, and a pair of boxwood hedges. Its five-bay street facade features a pedimented frontispiece with engaged columns, nine windows with oversided-quoin stone lintels, a double-hipped roof, three dormers with Welsh-arched windows, and a balustraded roof deck.

A 6 ft (1.8 m)-wide central passage runs from the front to the back of the house, and a lateral brick chimney wall on either side of the passage divides the first floor into four rooms. The front and rear rooms on the west side are parlors, the rear room on the east side is the dining room, and the front room on the east side is the stair hall.

Original features of the house include the 3-arch arcade separating the passage and stair hall, the mahogany 3-flight "hanging stairway" connecting the stair hall to the upper hall, and the broken-pedimented tabernacle-framed chimneybreast and cupboards of the dining room. "Also of importance is the front terrace, with the original retaining wall and piers between the street and house. Very few houses in Maryland boast a claire-voie."

== History ==
=== Thomas Smyth III ===
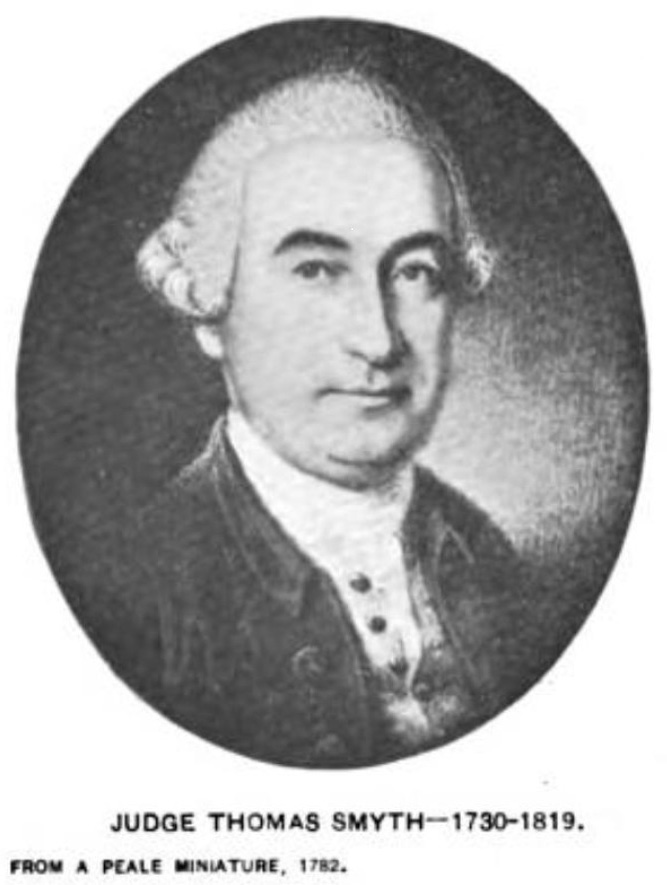
Portrait miniature of Thomas Smyth III (1782), by Peale

Thomas Smyth III (1730–1819) was a plantation owner, merchant, lawyer and Kent County judge.

By 1769, Smyth had an agreement of sale for "Water Lot #16" in Chestertown with his stepmother, Mary Frisbie Smyth Granger (1713-c.1776). She had been his father's second wife, and widow (1741), and was the mother of his half-brother Charles (b. 1736) and his half-sister Margaret (d. 1799). Mary Frisbie Smyth subsequently married William Granger, a widower with two daughters and a son. Her two children and three step-children were minors when William Granger died in 1752, making her a widow for the second time.

Because William Granger, Jr. (ca. 1749–1791) held an interest in his late father's Chestertown property, and was not yet 21, Smyth petitioned the Maryland General Assembly to allow the 20-year-old to act as an adult in the real estate transaction. Smyth's December 1769 petition provides documentation that his new house was already well under construction:

In Consequence whereof the said Thomas Smyth hath erected on the said Lot a Large and Valuable Brick House and Kitchen which he was Desirous of finishing and compleating immediately[,] but being unwilling to risque so valuable a part of his Property without securing his Title to the said Land[,] which could not be done while the said William Granger was under Age[,] the said Petitioners have prayed that an Act of Assembly might pass to enable the said William Granger[,] tho' under Age[,] to convey to the said Thomas Smyth all his[,] the said William Granger[']s[,] Right Title and Estate in the said Lot of Land in as full and ample Manner as if he was of full Age.

The Maryland General Assembly investigated and approved the petition. Smyth paid the agreed upon purchase price of GB£100, was granted clear title, and work on his new house resumed. He already owned the lot adjacent to the west, "Water Lot #17," having bought it from his father-in-law, Thomas Bedingfield Hands, in 1765.

==== Construction ====
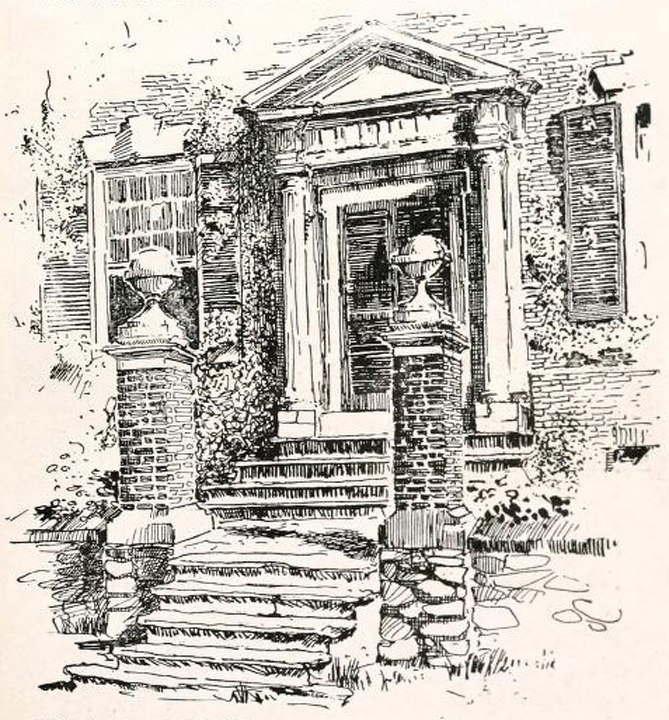
Circa-1916 drawing of Widehall's entrance

The designer of Widehall is unknown. Michael Owen Bourne, recorder of the NRHP nomination for Widehall (1972), and later author of the masterful Historic Houses of Kent County (1998), conjectures that it was built "possibly employing designs, if not craftsmen themselves from Annapolis or Philadelphia." King of Prussia marble was imported from outside Philadelphia to surround the house's fireplaces.

=== Later owners ===
In February 1790, Smyth sold his Chestertown house and the adjacent river wharves to Robert Anderson for GB£3250.5. At Robert Anderson's death, the properties passed to his brother, Thomas. In the mid-1790s, Thomas Anderson purchased "Water Lots #14 and #15" and part of "Water Lot #13," all to the east of the house. About 1795, he built his own house on "Water Lot #14," now known as the Anderson-Aldridge House.

Thomas Anderson sold the former Smyth house to U.S. Senator Robert Wright in 1801. Wright served as Governor of Maryland from 1806 to 1809, and as a U.S. Congressman from 1810 to 1817, and 1821 to 1823.

Benjamin and Elizabeth Chambers purchased the house from Wright in 1822, and it passed to their son, Ezekiel F. Chambers, who lived there until his death in 1867. He served as a state legislator from 1822 to 1826, as a U.S. Senator from 1826 to 1834, and as a judge of the Maryland Court of Appeals from 1834 to 1851. Ezekiel F. Chambers had the house insured in 1842, and the insurance survey described the house in detail, including the kitchen ell attached to the east side of the river facade:

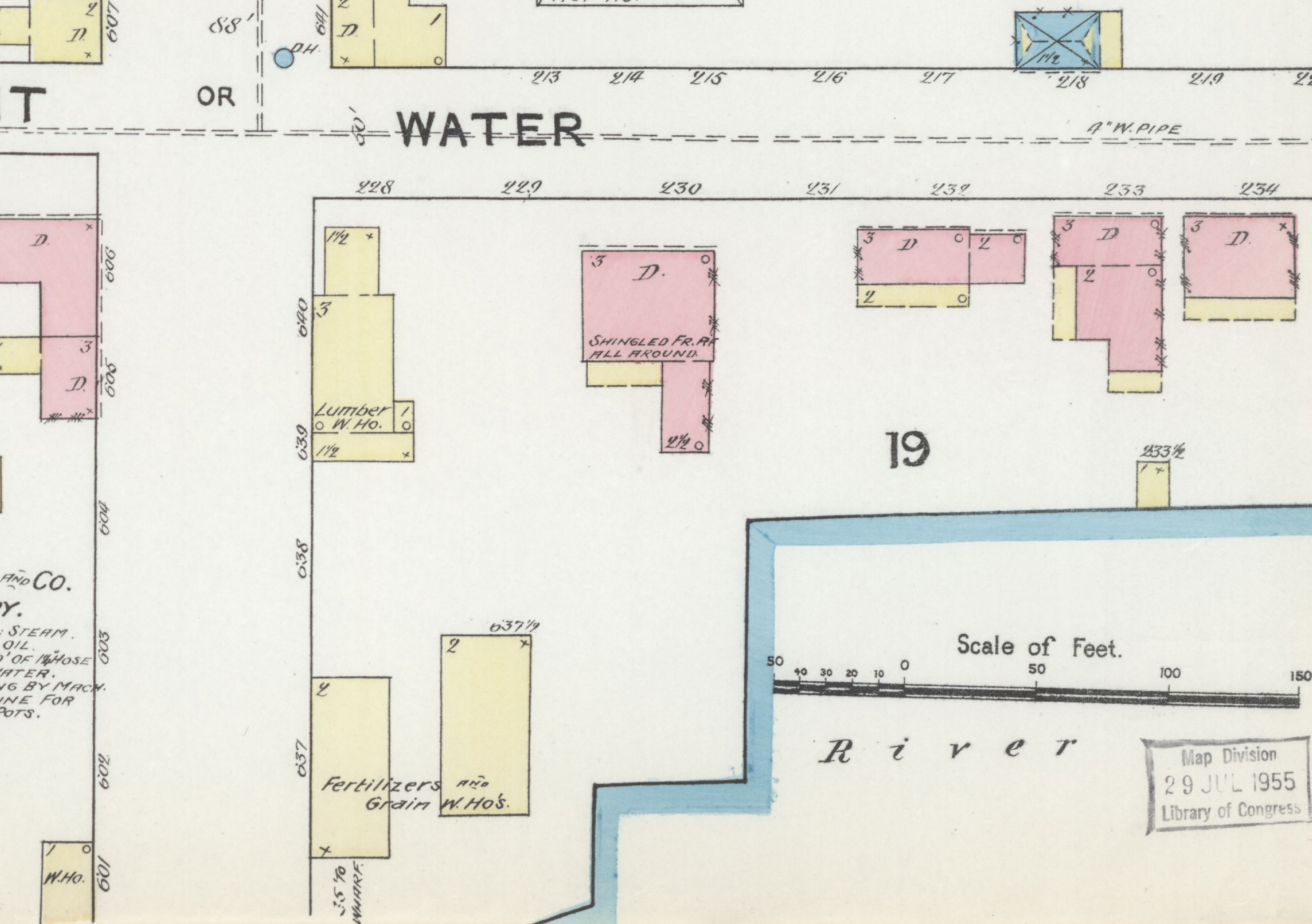
Detail of the 1891 Sanborn Fire Insurance Map, Plate 2. Widehall is the pink building above center.

The back building is brick two Story, 20 by 35 [ft], two rooms & a pantry in first Story & 4 rooms in 2nd [Story,] plastered Ceilings[,] two windows both sides both Stories, paneled shutters, Studs & brick partitions, a ledge door each side & to each room inside[,] brick floor to 1st [Story] & pine plank to 2nd [Story.] A fireplace in South end & Stairs to 2nd Story, loft over Not plastered[,] Cedar Shingle ridge roof[,] Oak Joist & Rafters.

Robert Clay Crawford purchased the house from the Ezekiel F. Chambers estate in 1867. He added a full third story with a Second Empire mansard roof. Two years later, George Burgin Westcott purchased the altered house from Crawford, and leased it out as Brown's Hotel. The hotel is shown on the 1891 Sanborn Fire Insurance Map of Chestertown, Kent County, Maryland, shaded in pink (brick building), and with the notations "D[welling,]" "3 [story,]" "Shingled Fr[ench] R[oo]f all around" and "2 1/2 [story]" kitchen ell. The map also shows a 3-story wooden lumber warehouse west of the house on the adjacent "Water Lot #17," along with a 2-story wooden fertilizer warehouse and a 2-story wooden grain warehouse (both southwest of the house).

The hotel had become a boarding-house operated by Mrs. M. E. Watts by August 1893, when the Chester River had a historic flood, and her boarders were evacuated by rowboat.

=== Hubbards ===
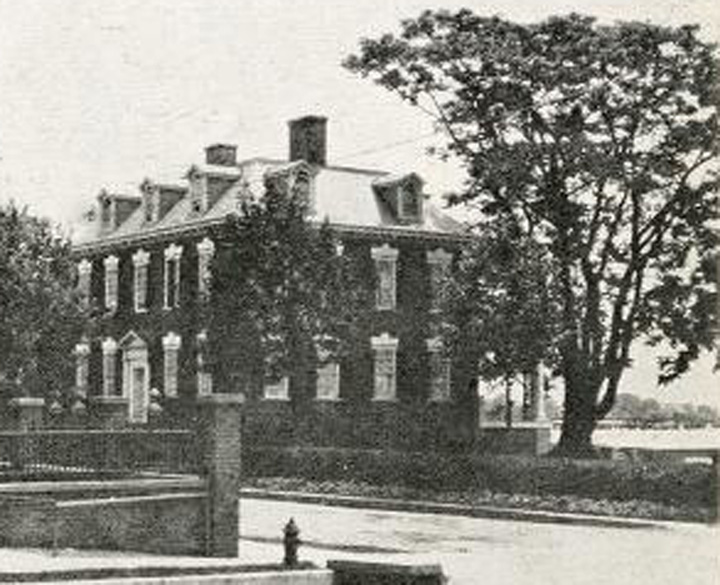
Widehall in 1916

Fertilizer manufacturer Wilbur Watson Hubbard (1860–1938) and his wife Etta Belle Ross (1865–1965) purchased the property in 1909. He owned the fertilizer warehouse on the adjacent "Water Lot #17," purchased the other two warehouses, and demolished all three buildings. The lot was transformed into part of the house's garden.

Baltimore architect Howard Sill began the renovation of Widehall in June 1910. He removed the Victorian, mansard-roofed third story, and recreated the house's original double-hipped roof and dormers. Hubbard purchased the lot adjacent to the east, "Water Lot #15," in 1911. Upon this lot was built a brick, Federal Revival, 2-story kitchen wing, designed to look as if it had been expanded in stages over time. Sill's kitchen wing solved a host of circulation problems. It featured a butler's pantry leading to the dining room, a large modern kitchen, a service stair to the wing's second floor servant bedrooms, another service stair to the house's cellar (descending beneath the first flight in the stair hall), and a hallway, cloak room and powder room accessible from the stair hall. The old kitchen ell was demolished, and Sill designed a grand, Federal Revival, two-story porch that was the full width of the river facade.

Sill also made alterations to the house's interior. The key document for the renovation was the 1842 insurance survey, which listed the architectural details of each room and included a plan of the first floor. The chimneybreast of the rear parlor had been removed and lost, so Sill installed a copy of the front parlor's chimneybreast. Sill removed the side-closets on either side of the front and rear parlor chimneybreasts, and replaced them with a pair of square archways between the rooms. The window under the hanging stairway became a door to the new kitchen wing's hallway, cloak room and powder room. The dining room was returned to its original size by the removal of a pre-1842 service stair. One of the dining room's two east windows became a door to the new butler's pantry, and two windows were installed in the south wall, giving the room a third window and a river view. (Note: Comparison of the 1842 first floor plan from the insurance survey with the modern first floor plan.)

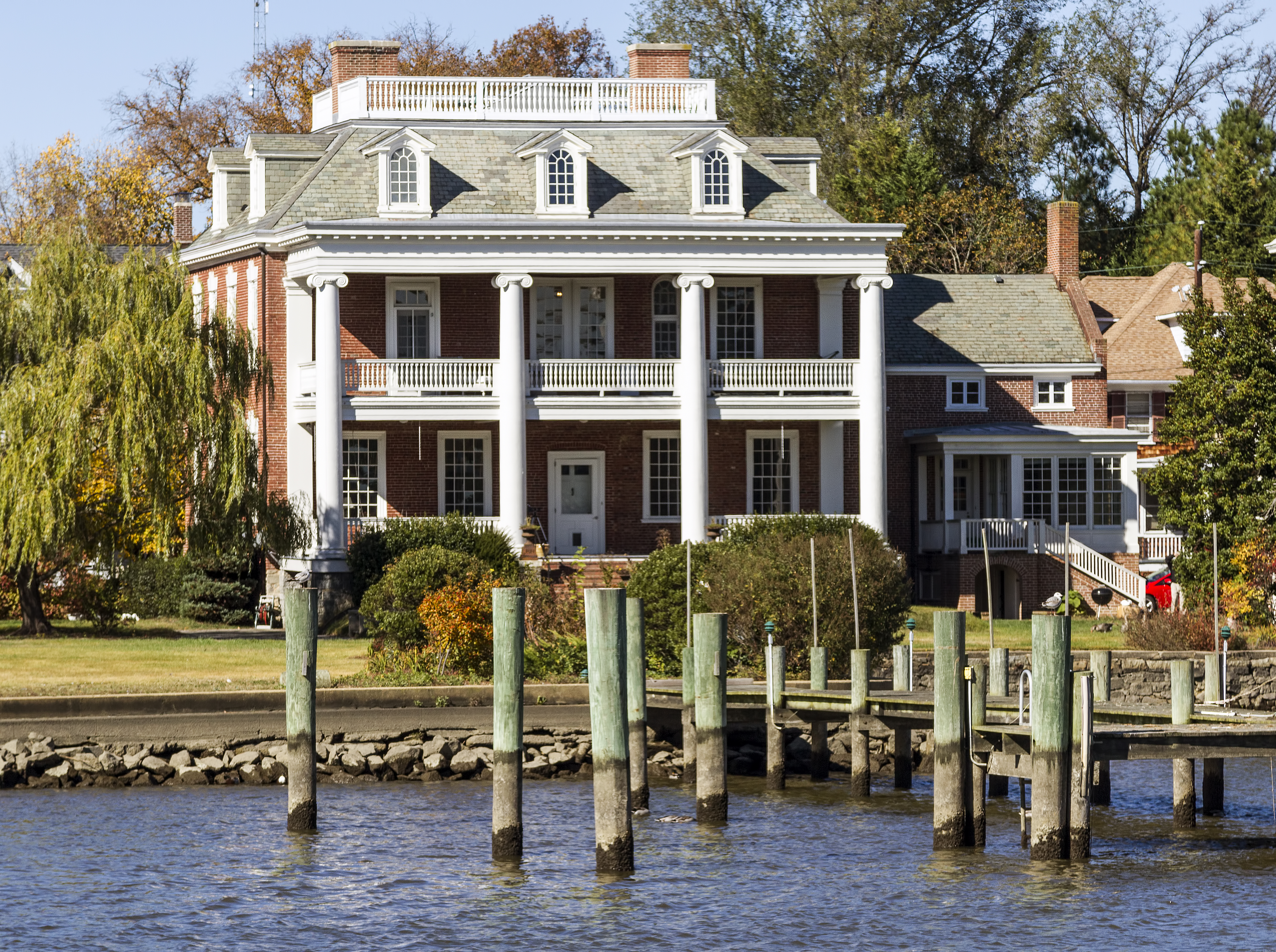
Widehall from the Chester River, 2013. The Federal Revival porch and the kitchen wing (right) were part of the 1910–1912 renovation.

The renovated house was initially called "Chester Place," followed by "Hubbard Place." Mrs. Hubbard finally settled on the name "Widehall," (Note: "Mr. and Mrs. Wilbur W. Hubbard, Chestertown, Md., announce the marriage of their daughter, Miriam Warren Hubbard, to Mr. George Maurice Morris, Lieutenant, Ordnance Department, United States Army, which took place at Widehall, Chestertown, Md., on Saturday, October 26, 1918.") after the 3-bay upper hall of the second story.

The couple's son, Wilbur Ross Hubbard (1896–1993), was a major collector of antique furniture, silver and china, and occupied Widehall until his death at age 97. He restored a number of historic buildings in Chestertown, and was an inveterate foxhunter into his 90s. Hubbard spoke about his mother and Widehall in a c.1979 oral history:

She spent a great deal of her time arguing with my father and the architect. My father just wanted to pay the bill and get the whole thing over with, and the architect wanted to do too much. He knew something about colonial woodwork and moldings and so forth, but he wanted to dress it up and show how much he knew, and mother kept saying, "No, I want to put it back as nearly as possible to the way it was originally." Well, that's modern restoration. Nobody was doing that then, and mother was so misunderstood that the ladies up and down Water Street ... just didn't understand mother. After she got through she went around buying antique furniture, and they said, "Just imagine, Mrs. Hubbard spending all of that money to fix over that old house when she could have built a new one, and for less, and now she's going around buying second-hand furniture to put in it."

=== Recent history ===
Widehall was sold in February 1996 for US$875,000, and in April 1998 for US$1,150,000. Following a major renovation, (Note: "Widehall was built in 1769 by Colonel Thomas Smyth (1730–1819), and has been extensively renovated by Mr. and Mrs. Bruce Miller, to the period of the Hubbard renovation of 1911.") it was sold in 2003 for US$2,955,000, and in 2014 for US$2,000,000. In August 2021, Widehall was listed for sale for US$4,400,000.

== Significance ==
Widehall was photographed by the Historic American Buildings Survey in October 1936. It was listed on the National Register of Historic Places in 1972.

=== HABS photographs (1936) ===
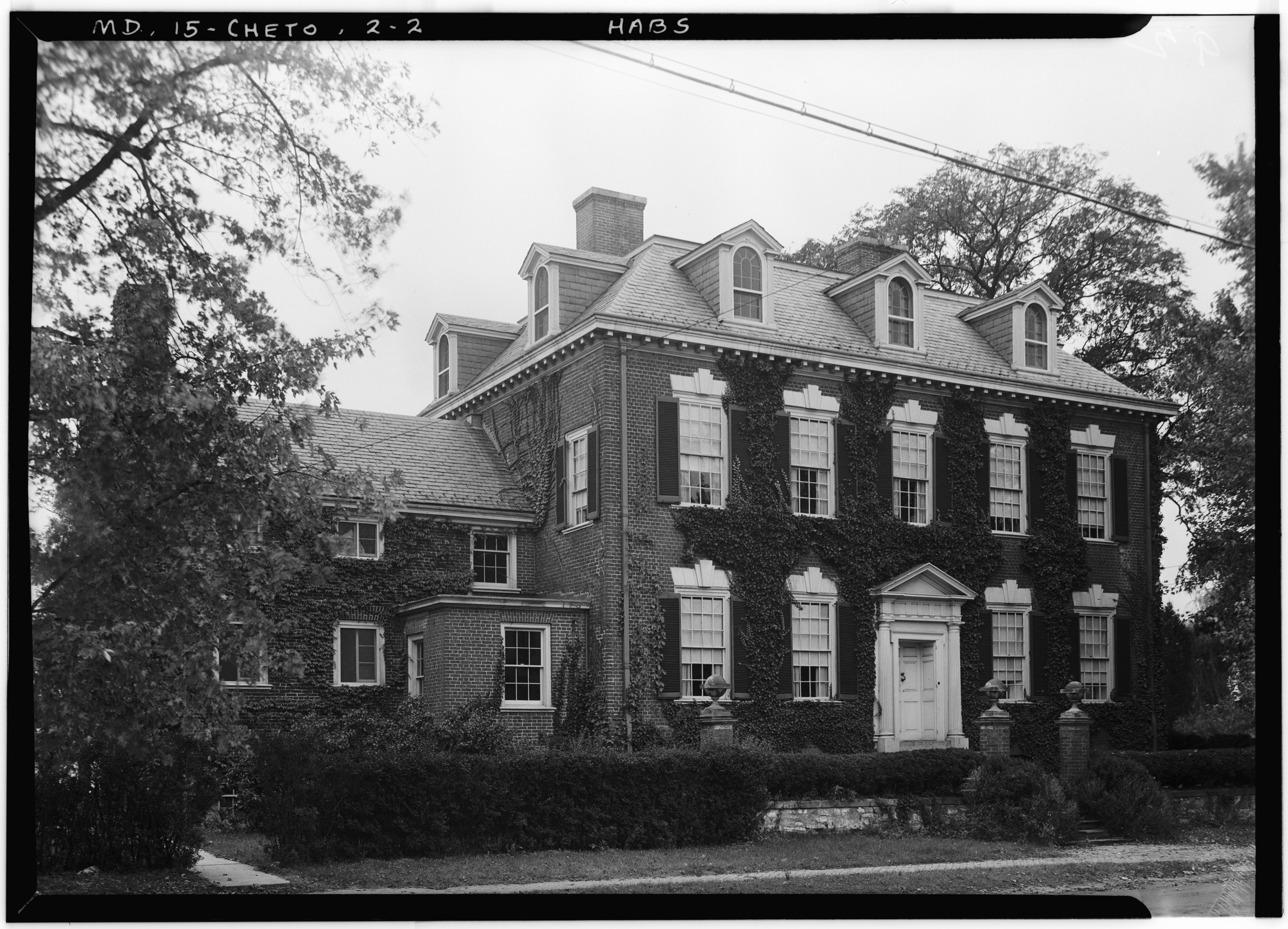
Water Street facade and 1911 kitchen

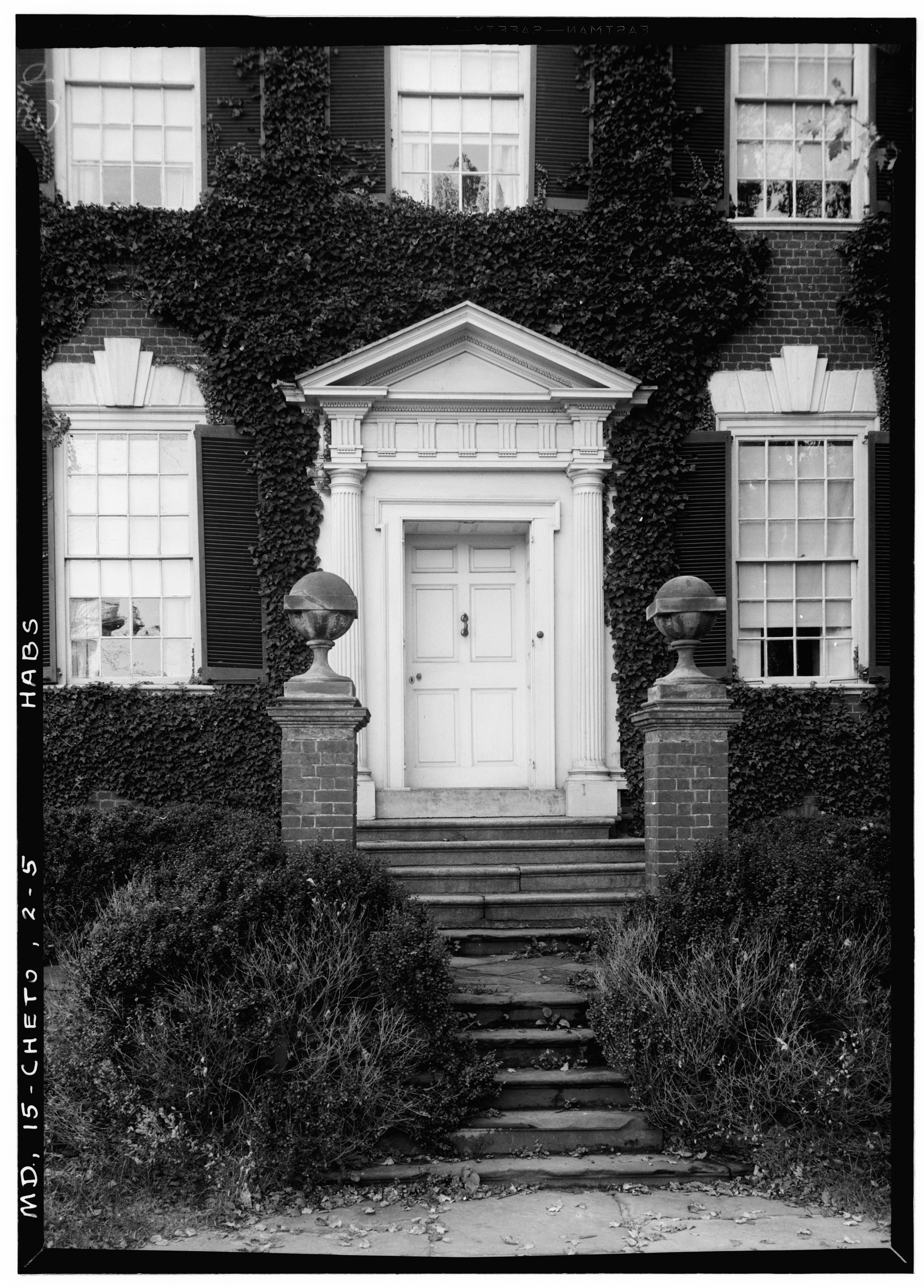
Entrance

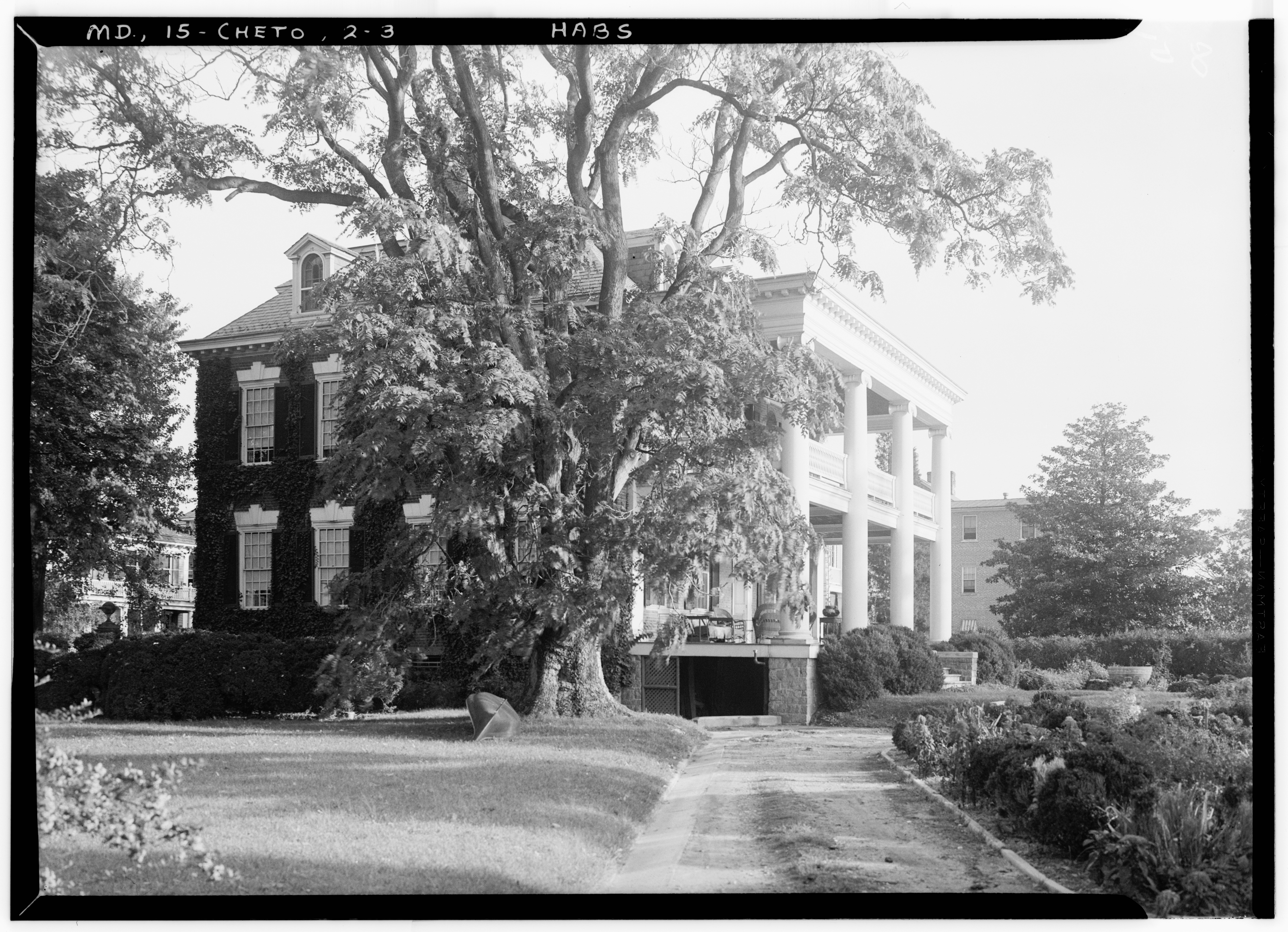
Porch

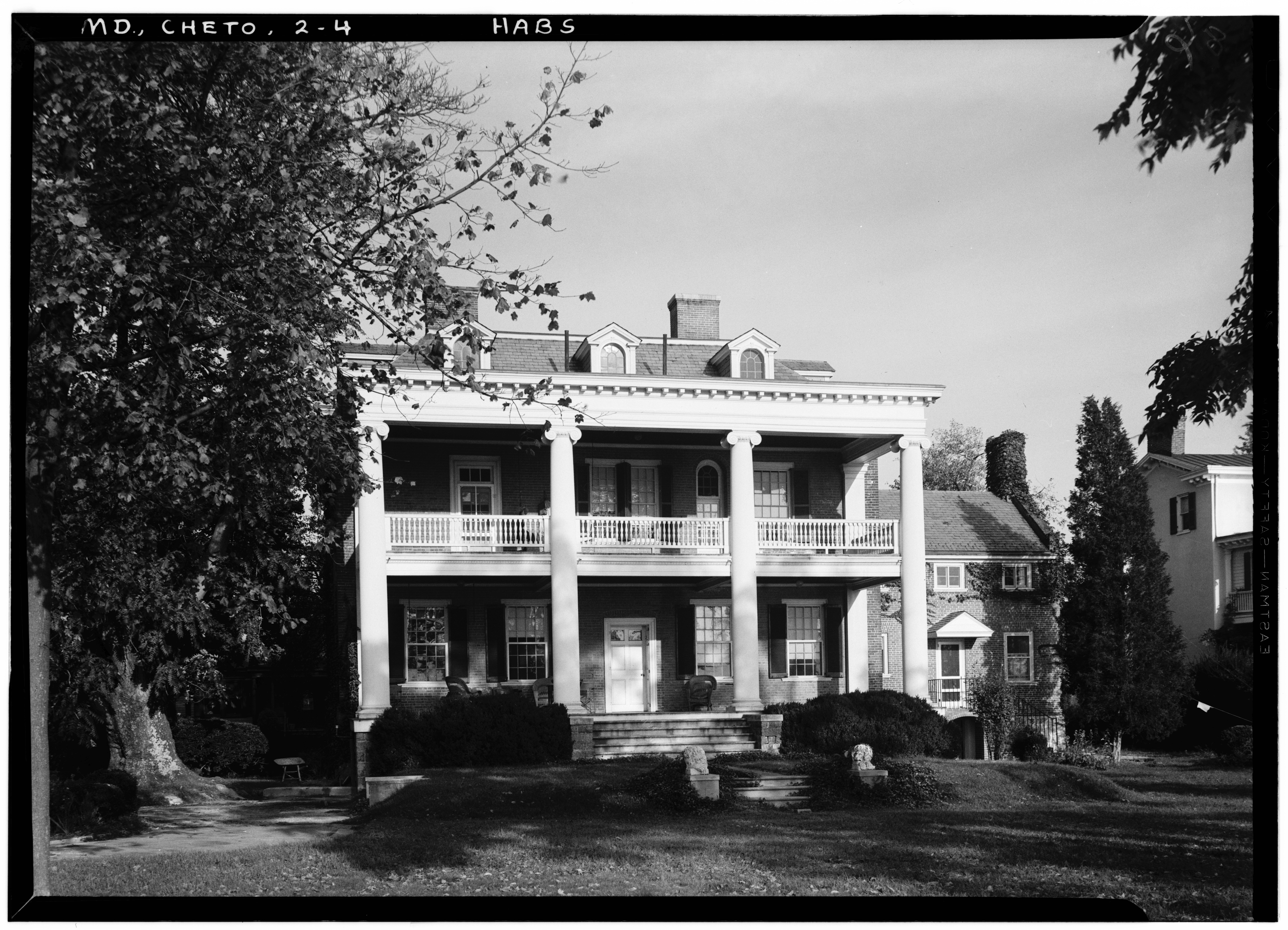
River facade

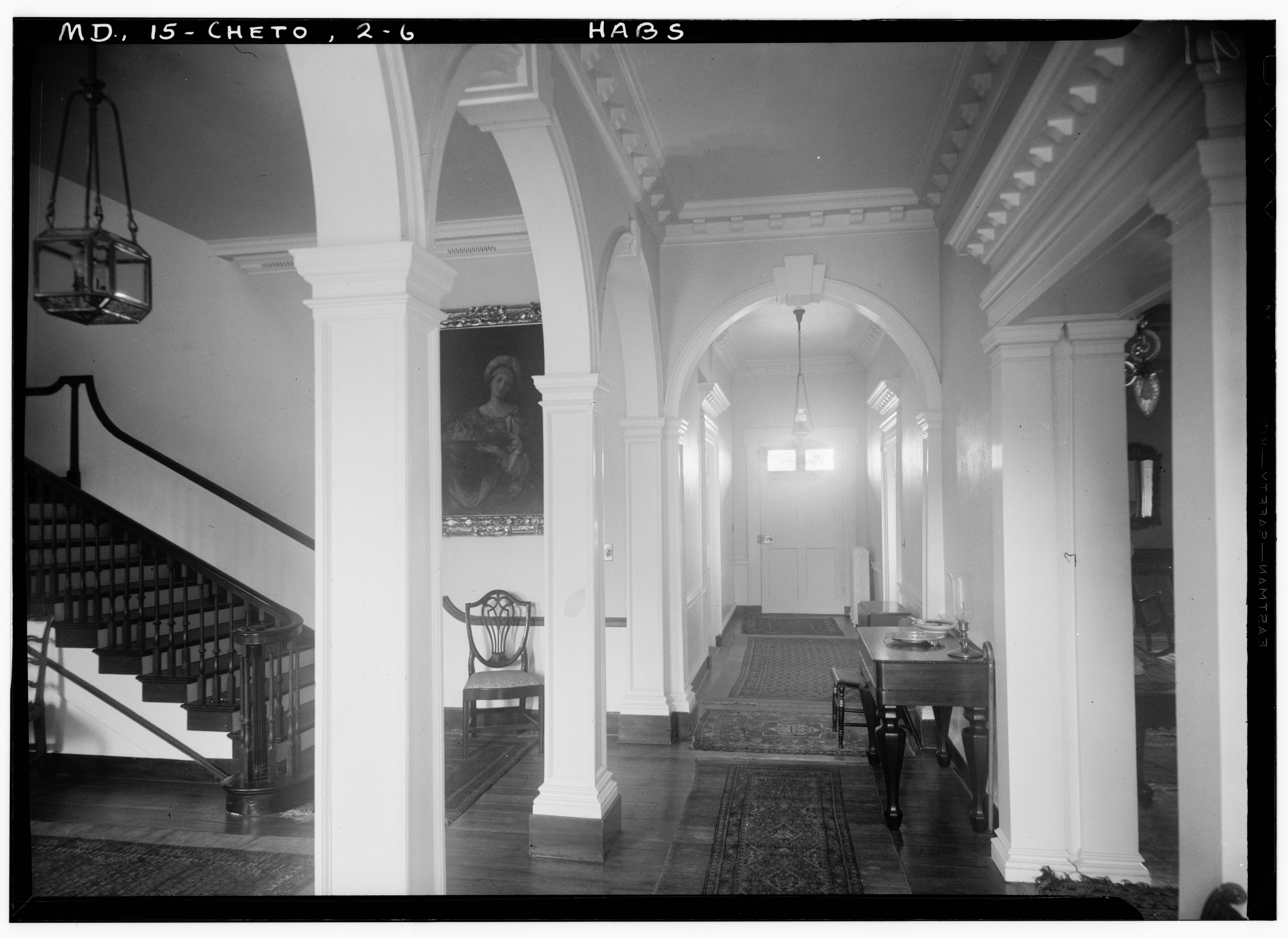
Passage

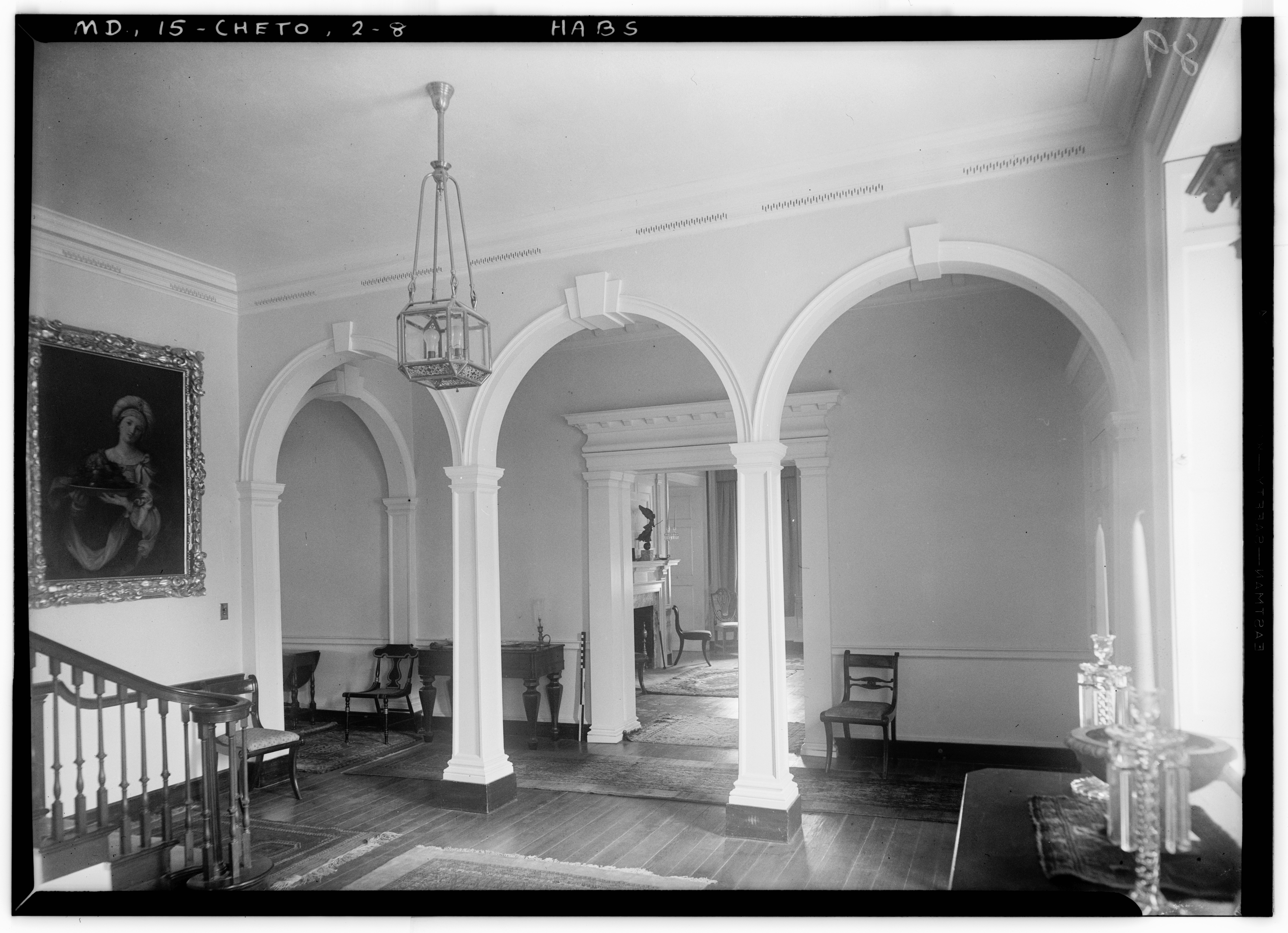
Hall

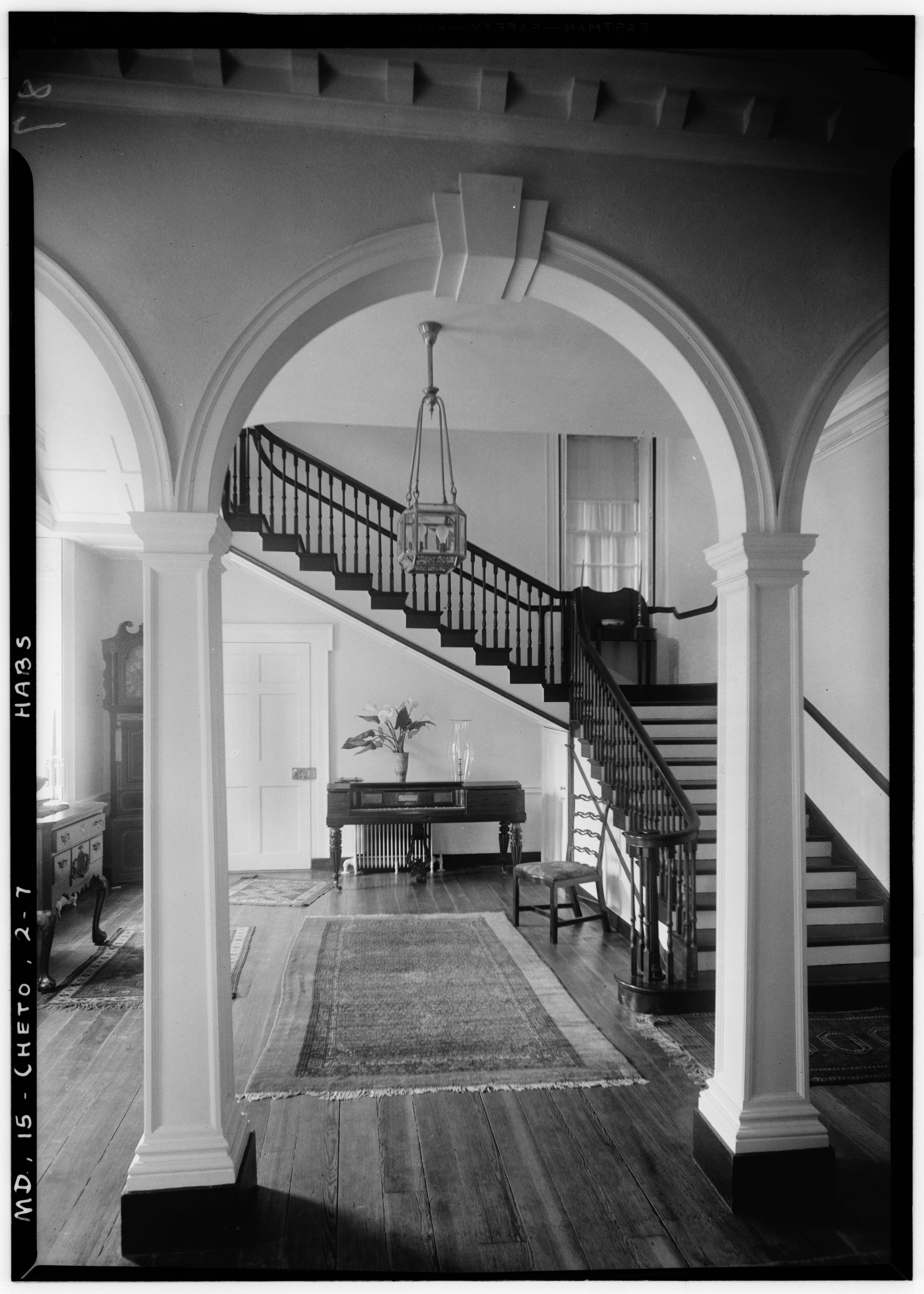
Stair

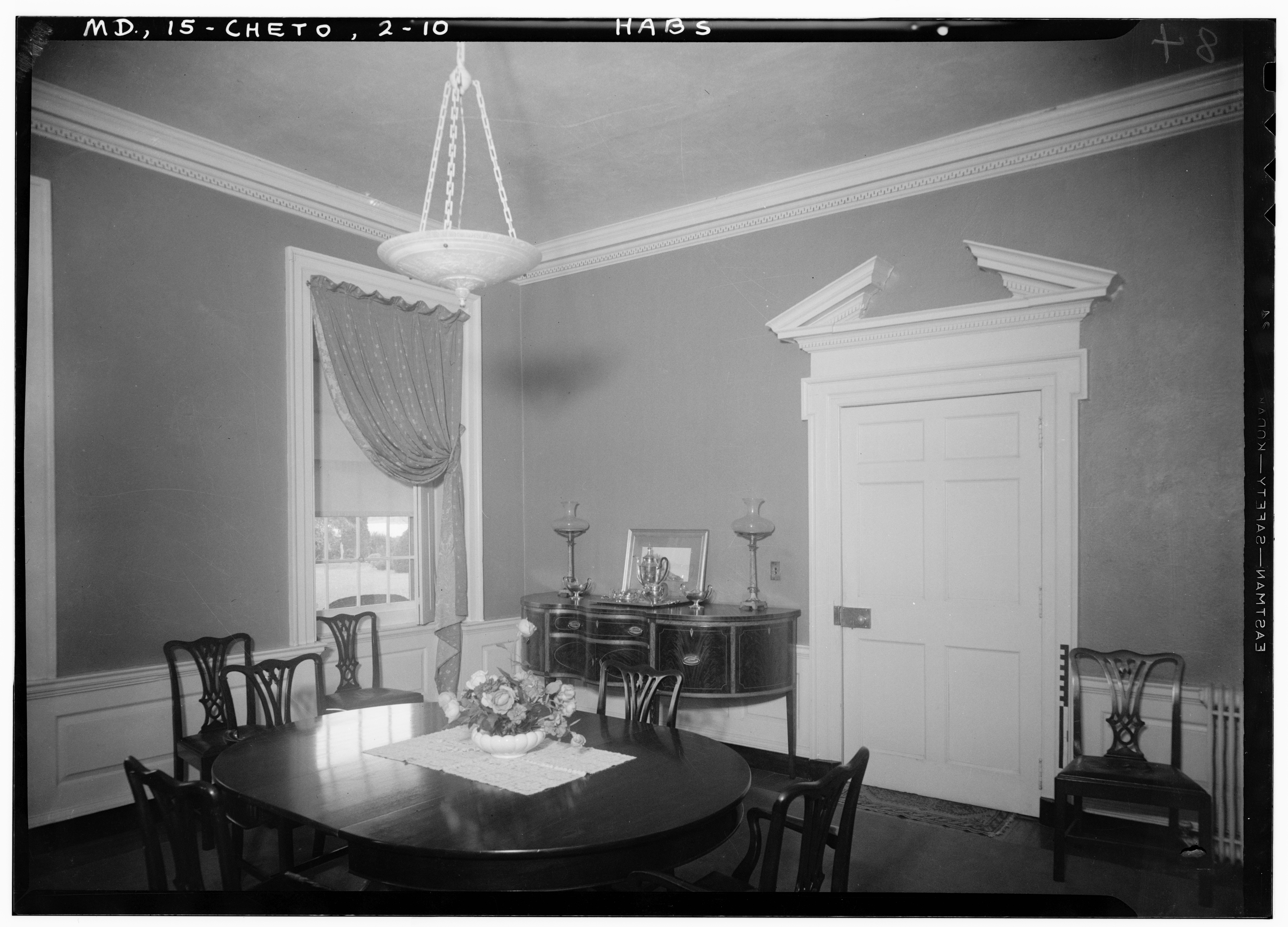
Dining Room

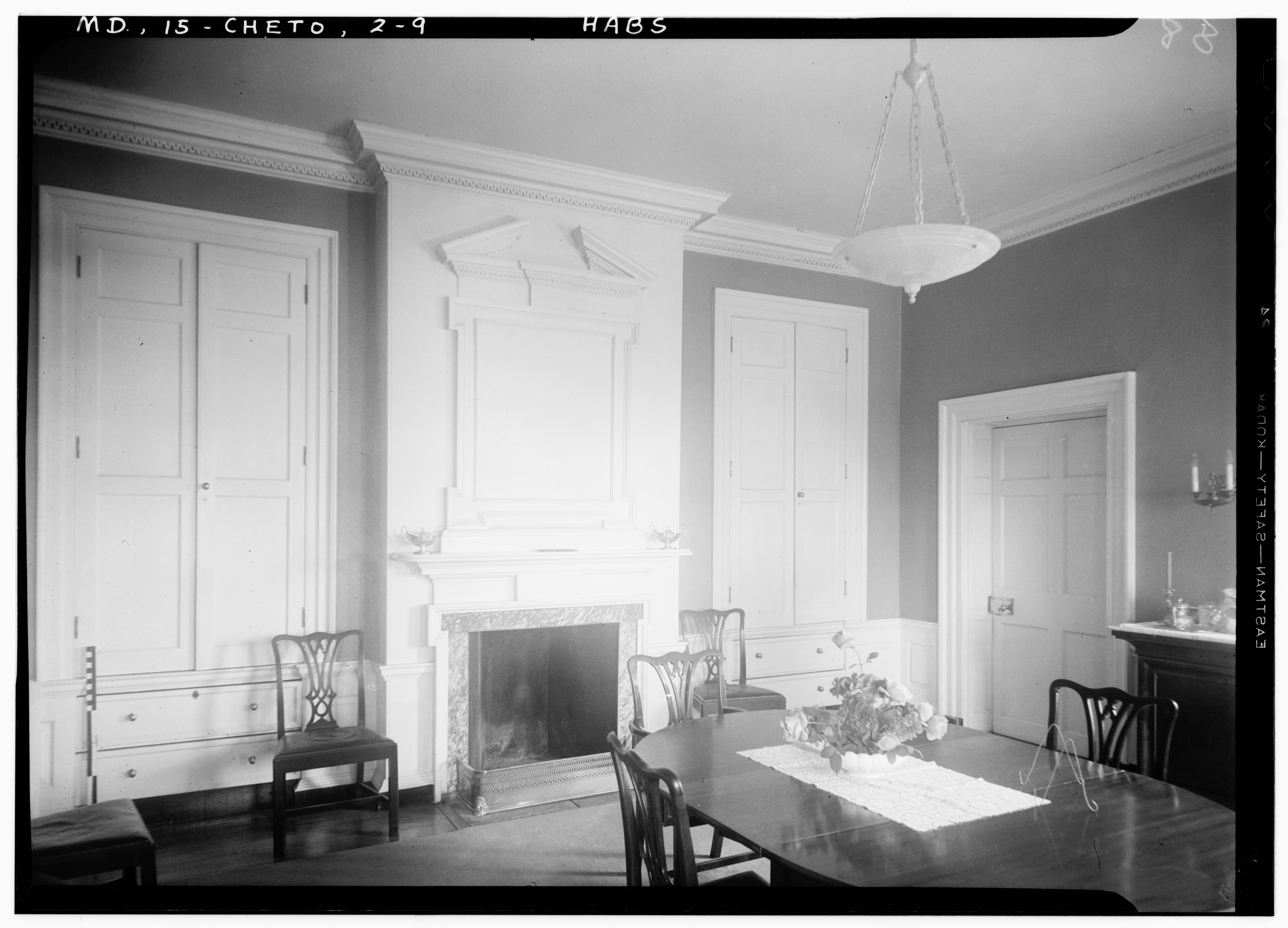
Dining Room chimney-breast

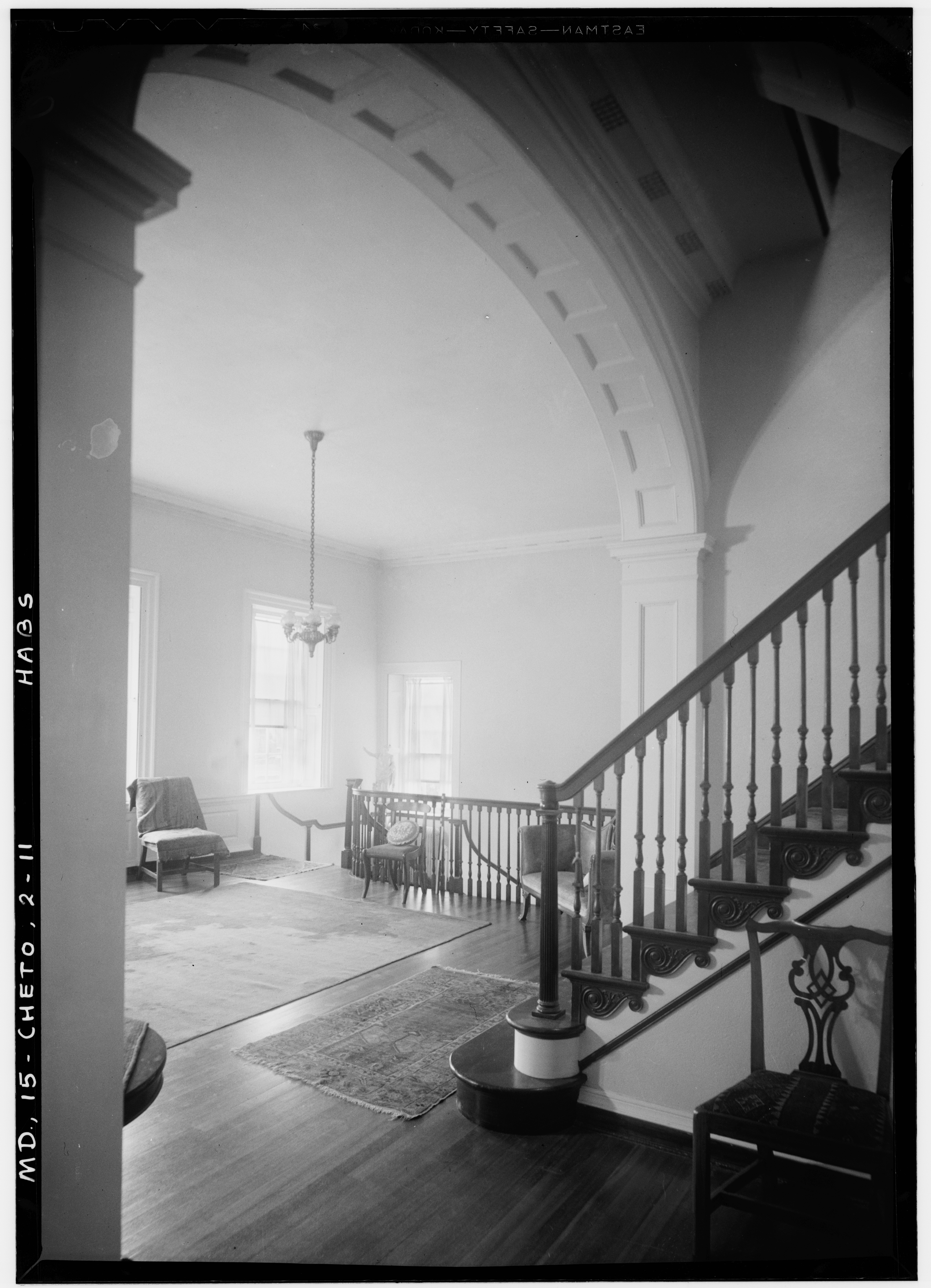
Upper Hall

=== NRHP listing (1972) ===
Chestertown. WIDEHALL, 101 Water St. 1769.
Brick, 2 1/2 stories over high basement, rectangular, hip-on-hipped roof, interior chimneys, gabled dormers, modillion cornice, front center entrance with pediment supported by engaged fluted columns, Welsh arched windows, rear full-width 2-story Ionic portico;
[R]oof, dormers, 2-story NE kitchen, and rear porch added during 1910 restoration. Georgian.
Built by Thomas Smyth, wealthy county merchant and shipbuilder; later home of Robert Wright, U.S. senator and MD governor (1806–1809), and of Ezekial Chambers, state and U.S. senator and court of appeals judge.
Private: HABS.
