= Zenith Jones Brown =

American writer (1898–1983)

- Born: Zenith Jones; December 8, 1898; Smith River, California, U.S.
- Died: August 25, 1983 (aged 84); Baltimore, Maryland, U.S.
- Occupation: Writer
- Spouse: Ford K. Brown
- Children: 1
- Relatives: Ezekiel Forman Chambers (grandfather)

Zenith Jones Brown (December 8, 1898 – August 25, 1983) was an American crime fiction writer who also wrote for a time in England. She wrote under the pseudonyms David Frome, Leslie Ford, and Brenda Conrad. She is perhaps best known for her novels featuring the fictional Grace Latham and John Primrose, though some of her earlier standalone work has been praised.

== Biography ==
She was born Zenith Jones in Smith River, California, to Milnor Jones. Her mother was a Calvert. Her grandfather was Ezekiel Forman Chambers. She grew up in Tacoma, Washington. Brown was educated at the University of Washington, and worked there as a teaching assistant from 1921 to 1923. She was also assistant to the editor and circulation manager for Dial magazine from 1922 to 1923. Brown began writing as “David Frome” in 1929 while staying in London with her husband. She returned to the United States in 1931, and the couple settled in Annapolis, Maryland. Brown used the pen name “Leslie Ford” for her mystery novels published in the United States. During World War II, she wrote several novels about nurses under the name “Brenda Conrad”. Brown was also a war correspondent for the United States Air Force in England and the Pacific.

Her books often appeared in serial format in The Saturday Evening Post before being published. Brown also wrote short stories, which were published in various periodicals and anthologies.

She married Ford K. Brown, a professor, in 1921. The couple had one daughter, Janet Calvert.

Brown died at the Church Home and Hospital in Baltimore at the age of 84.

== Selected books ==
- as David Frome
  - Murder of an Old Man (1929)
  - The Hammersmith Murders (1930) - Features Mr. Evan Pinkerton
  - The Strange Death of Martin Green (1930) (The Murder on the Sixth Hole in Britain)
  - Two Against Scotland Yard (1931) - Pinkerton
  - The Man From Scotland Yard (1932) - Pinkerton
  - The Eel Pie Murders (1933) - Pinkerton
  - Scotland Yard Can Wait (1933)
  - Mr. Pinkerton Finds a Body (1934)
  - Mr. Pinkerton Goes to Scotland Yard (1934)
  - Mr. Pinkerton Grows a Beard (1935)
  - Mr. Pinkerton Has The Clue (1936)
  - The Black Envelope (1937) - Pinkerton
  - Mr. Pinkerton at the Old Angel (1939)
  - Passage For One (1945) - Pinkerton; novella
  - Homicide House (1950) - Pinkerton
- as Leslie Ford
  - The Sound of Footsteps (1931) (Footsteps on the Stairs in Britain)
  - By The Watchman's Clock (1932)
  - Murder in Maryland (1932) - Lt. Joseph Kelly
  - The Clue of the Judas Tree (1933) - Lt. Joseph Kelly
  - The Strangled Witness (1934) - Colonel John Primrose
  - Ill Met By Moonlight (1937) - Mrs. Grace Latham and Col. Primrose
  - The Simple Way of Poison (1937) - Mrs. Latham and Col. Primrose
  - Three Bright Pebbles (1938) - Mrs. Latham
  - Old Lover's Ghost (1939) - Mrs. Latham and Col. Primrose
  - Reno Rendezvous (1939) - Mrs. Latham and Col. Primrose
  - The Town Cried Murder (1939)
  - The Road to Folly (1940)
  - The Murder of a Fifth Columnist (1941) - Mrs. Latham and Col. Primrose
  - Murder in the O.P.M. (1942) - Mrs. Latham and Col. Primrose
  - Murder with Southern Hospitality - Mrs. Latham and Col. Primrose
  - All For The Love of a Lady (1943) - Mrs. Latham and Col. Primrose
  - Siren in the Night (1943) - Mrs. Latham and Col. Primrose
  - The Philadelphia Murder Story (1945) - Mrs. Latham and Col. Primrose
  - False To Any Man (1947) - Mrs. Latham and Col. Primrose
  - Honolulu Murder Story (1947) - Mrs. Latham and Col. Primrose
  - The Devil's Stronghold (1948) - Mrs. Latham and Col. Primrose
  - The Woman In Black (1948) - Mrs. Latham
  - Date With Death (1949)
  - Murder is the Pay-Off (1951)
  - The Bahamas Murder Case (1952)
  - Washington Whispers Murder (1953) - Mrs. Latham and Col. Primrose
  - Invitation to Murder (1954)
  - Murder Comes to Eden (1955)
  - The Girl from the Mimosa Club (1957) - Detective Sgt. Dave Thumper
  - Trial by Ambush (1962) - Detective Sgt. Dave Thumper
- as Brenda Conrad
  - The Stars Give Warning (1941)
  - Caribbean Conspiracy (1942)
  - Girl with a Golden Bar (1944)
