= Washington Whispers Murder =

1953 murder mystery novel by Leslie Ford

Washington Whispers Murder is a 1953 murder mystery by American writer Leslie Ford. It was published in hardcover by Charles Scribner's Sons and later in paperback by Dell.
