= 1864 Maryland gubernatorial election =

- November 8, 1864
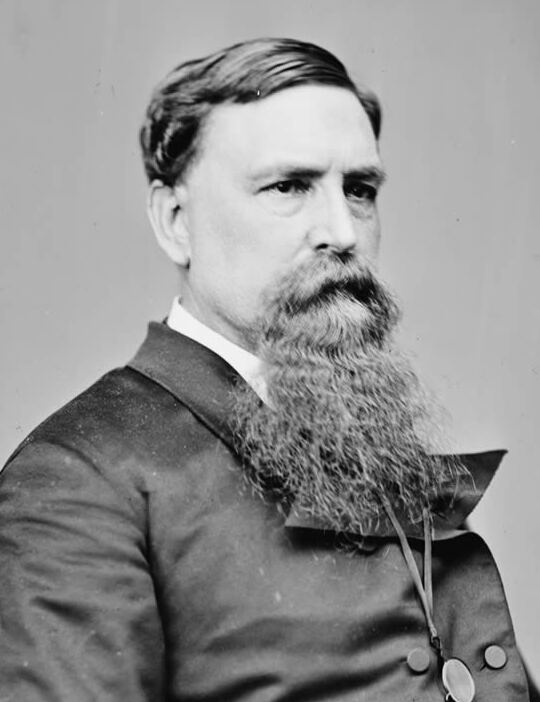

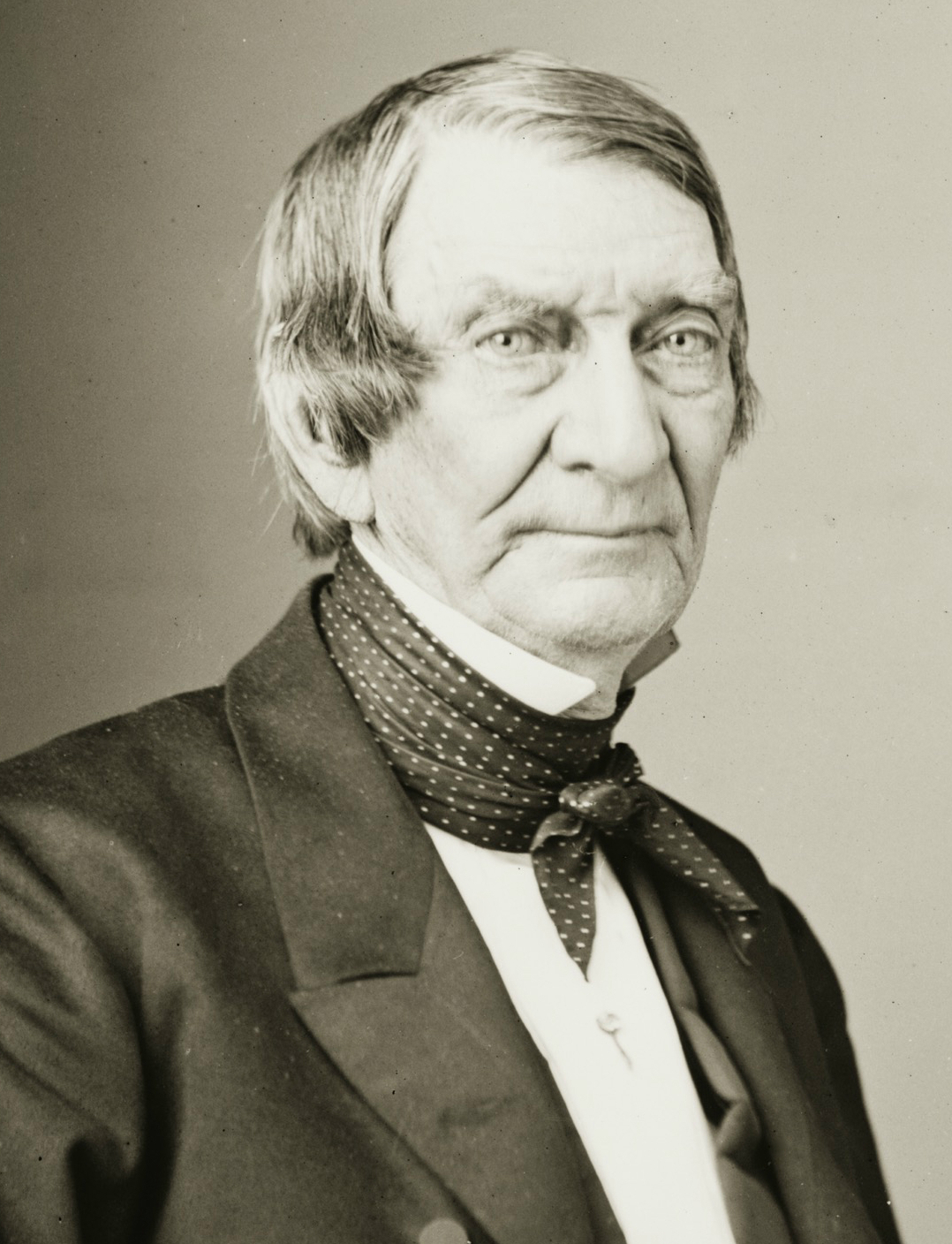
Nominee	Thomas Swann	Ezekiel F. Chambers
Party	Union	Democratic
Popular vote	40,579	32,068
Percentage	55.86%	44.14%
- County results Swann: 50–60% 60–70% 70–80% 80–90% Chambers: 50–60% 60–70% 70–80% 80–90% >90%
Governor before election
Augustus Bradford
Union
Elected Governor
Thomas Swann
Union

The 1864 Maryland gubernatorial election took place on November 8, 1864. Incumbent Union Party Governor Augustus Bradford did not run for re-election. Union Party candidate Thomas Swann defeated Democratic candidate Ezekiel F. Chambers.

The Union Party was a Southern Unionist political movement which supported the Lincoln administration. Most Unionists were former Whigs who had joined the Know Nothing movement in the 1850s, while a minority were Radical Republicans or War Democrats. The party supported the re-election of Abraham Lincoln under the banner of the National Union Party.

Swann took his oath of office on January 11, 1865, but by a provision of the 1864 State Constitution, he did not actually become Governor until January 10, 1866.

== Results ==
1864 Maryland gubernatorial election (Note: OurCampaigns records the result as Swann 41,828, Chambers 32,178. This was actually the result of the concurrent election for Lieutenant Governor.)
Party	Candidate	Votes	%	±%
Union	Thomas Swann	40,579	55.86%	
Democratic	Ezekiel F. Chambers	32,068	44.14%	
Majority		8,511	11.72%	
Turnout		72,647	100.00%	
Union hold		Swing		
