= Murder Comes to Eden =

1955 mystery novel by Leslie Ford

- Author: Leslie Ford
- Language: English
- Genre: Mystery Novel
- Publisher: Charles Scribner's Sons
- Publication date: 1955

Murder Comes to Eden is a murder mystery novel written by Leslie Ford. It was published in hardcover by Charles Scribner's Sons in 1955.

== Plot ==
The novel centers on Spig and Molly O'Leary, a married couple living on the eastern shore of Maryland, in Eden, Devon County, a peaceful country town. This is all threatened by the planned building of a new bridge and super highway that will bring an influx of visitors and residents to Eden. The O'Leary family is particularly upset when they learn that their neighbors are reportedly going to sell off part of their land to build a gambling hall.

== Release ==
Murder Comes to Eden was first published in hardback in the United States in 1955, through Charles Scribner's Sons.

== Reception ==
Upon its release, critical reception was favorable. A reviewer for The Pittsburg Press stated that it was "considerably more complex than the average run of mysteries."
