= Chestertown Historic District (Chestertown, Maryland) =

Historic district in Maryland, United States

- U.S. National Register of Historic Places
- U.S. National Historic Landmark District
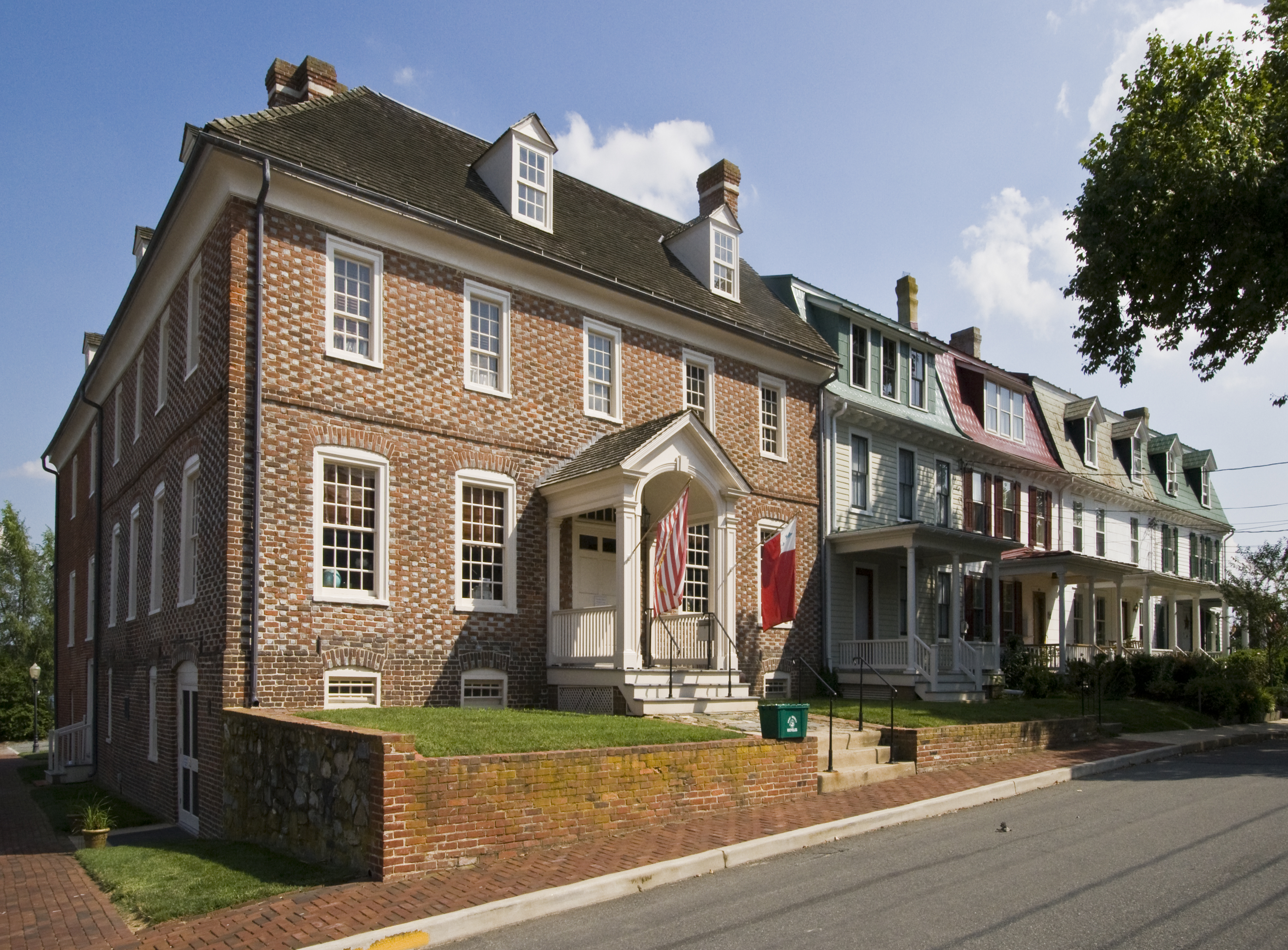
- Custom House, 101 North Water Street and neighboring Victorian-era houses

- Location within Maryland Location within the United States
- Location: Roughly bounded by Maple Ave., Chester River, Cannon and Cross Sts., Chestertown, Maryland and increase roughly bounded by Chester River, Lynchberg, and Cannon Sts., College Ave., Philosophers and Riverside Terrs., Chestertown, Maryland
- Coordinates: 39°12′45″N 76°4′10″W
- Built: 1750
- Architect: Multiple
- Architectural style: Georgian, Gothic Revival, Federal
- NRHP reference No.: 70000263 (original); 84001808 (increase 1); 100013208 (increase 2)

Significant dates
- Added to NRHP: April 15, 1970
- Boundary increases: September 13, 1984; July 13, 2026
- Designated NHLD: April 15, 1970

Chestertown Historic District is a historic district in Chestertown, Maryland. It was listed on the National Register of Historic Places and designated a National Historic Landmark in 1970, and its area was increased in 1984 and 2026. The town on the Chester River, became the chief port for tobacco and wheat on the Eastern Shore of Maryland between 1750 and 1790. The port declined thereafter, as Baltimore became the major port for such activity. In consequence, Chestertown acquired a collection of more than fifty Georgian style town houses. The 18th-century residential area survived without harm a 1910 fire that destroyed the central business district of Chestertown.

The historic residential area is concentrated along Water Street between the business district and the Chester River. Highlights include:

- Hynson-Ringgold House ("The Abbey"), 100 South Water Street. Built in 1767 by merchant Thomas Ringgold by uniting two adjoining 1735 houses into a three-art house. Interiors were designed by William Buckland between 1767 and 1771. The original Chippendale-Georgian paneling in the drawing room was removed and installed at the Baltimore Museum of Art in the 1920s. The house was restored in the 1930s and is the residence of the president of Washington College.
- Custom House, 101 South Water Street. A three-story brick house in two parts, stated to have been owned by the Ringgold family in the 1740s. The first floor was used as a warehouse, with living quarters on the upper levels. The building was used as Chestertown's custom house. The rear section was added in 1771.
- Widehall, 101 North Water Street. Individually listed on the National Register of Historic Places, Widehall was built by Thomas Smythe about 1770. The house's exterior has been altered from the original Georgian style, while elaborate interiors remain.
- River House, also known as the Denton House, 107 North Water Street. Built between 1737 and 1743 by William Timbrill, a Barbados merchant. The interiors are Georgian, while the exterior has been modified in Greek Revival style. The paneling of the third floor master bedroom was purchased by the Winterthur Museum in 1926.

A number of other structures on Water Street, High Street and Queen Street are included. Denton House and Widehall are also individually listed Registered Historic Places included in the district.

== See also ==
- List of National Historic Landmarks in Maryland
- National Register of Historic Places listings in Kent County, Maryland
