= Lady in Black =

Lady in Black may refer to:

== Film and television ==
- The Lady in Black (1920 film), a silent German film
- The Lady in Black (1928 film), a silent German film
- The Lady in Black (1958 film), a Swedish film
- The Lady in Black (1951 film), a West German film
- Ladies in Black (film), a 2018 Australian film by Bruce Beresford
- Ladies in Black (TV series), a 2024 Australian television drama series based on the 2018 film

== Music ==
- Lady in Black, a 1994 album by Uriah Heep
- "Lady in Black" (Uriah Heep song), 1971
- "Lady in Black" (Bad Boys Blue song), 1989
- A song from the Mercyful Fate album Time

== Other uses ==
- A cultivar name of the flower Symphyotrichum lateriflorum, a species of Aster
- A nickname for the Darlington Raceway, a NASCAR auto racing track in South Carolina, United States
- The Lady in Black, a ghost on Georges Island
- Ladies in Black, a 2015 Australian musical by Tim Finn and Carolyn Burns

== See also ==
- The Woman in Black (disambiguation)
