= The Woman in Black (Ford novel) =

Mystery novel by Leslie Ford

First edition (UK)

The Woman in Black is a mystery novel by Zenith Jones Brown under the pen name Leslie Ford. It was first published in 1948 by Charles Scribner's Sons in the United States and by Collins Crime Club in England. It has been reprinted several times, including by Dell in 1957 and by Popular Library in 1963, and is available through Wildside Press as of 2017.
