= Maryland Route 292 =

State highway in Maryland, United States

Maryland Route 292
- Maryland Route 292 highlighted in red

Route information
- Maintained by MDSHA
- Length: 4.58 mi (7.37 km)
- Existed: 1927–present
- Tourist routes: Chesapeake Country Scenic Byway

Major junctions
- South end: MD 298 near Still Pond
- MD 566 at Still Pond
- North end: Road end at Sassafras River in Betterton

Location
- Country: United States
- State: Maryland
- Counties: Kent

Highway system
- Maryland highway system; Interstate; US; State; Scenic Byways
| ← MD 291 | → I-295 |

Maryland Route 292 (MD 292) is a state highway in the U.S. state of Maryland. Known for most of its length as Still Pond Road, the highway runs 4.58 miles (7.37 km) from MD 298 near Still Pond north to the Sassafras River in Betterton in northern Kent County. MD 292 was constructed in the early to mid-1910s between Still Pond and Betterton and in the early 1920s south of Still Pond to what is now MD 213. The highway from Still Pond to Betterton was widened in the late 1940s and resurfaced in the late 1960s. The portion of MD 292 between MD 213 and MD 298 was transferred to county control in 1994.

== Route description ==
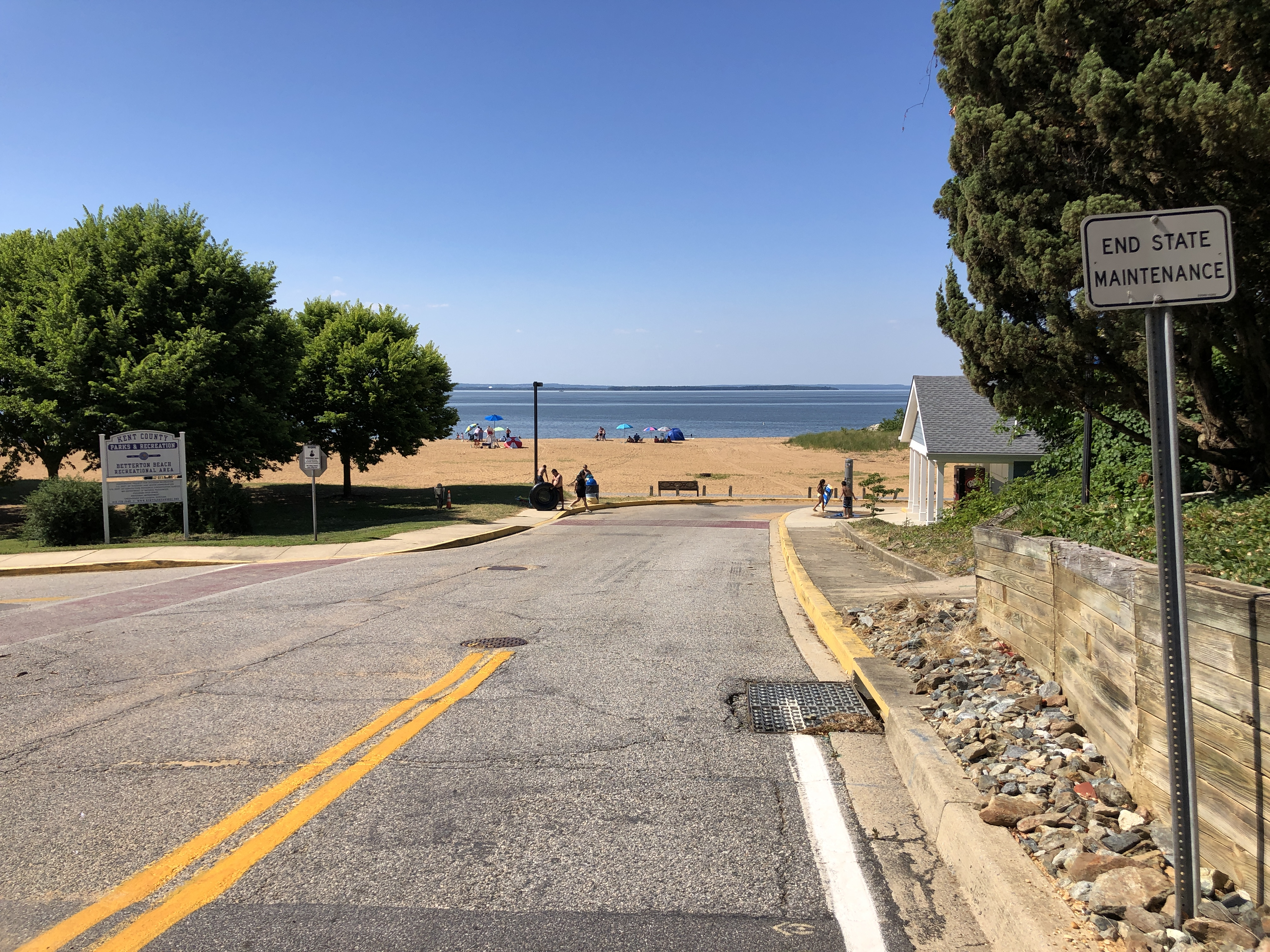
MD 292's northern terminus at the Sassafras River in Betterton

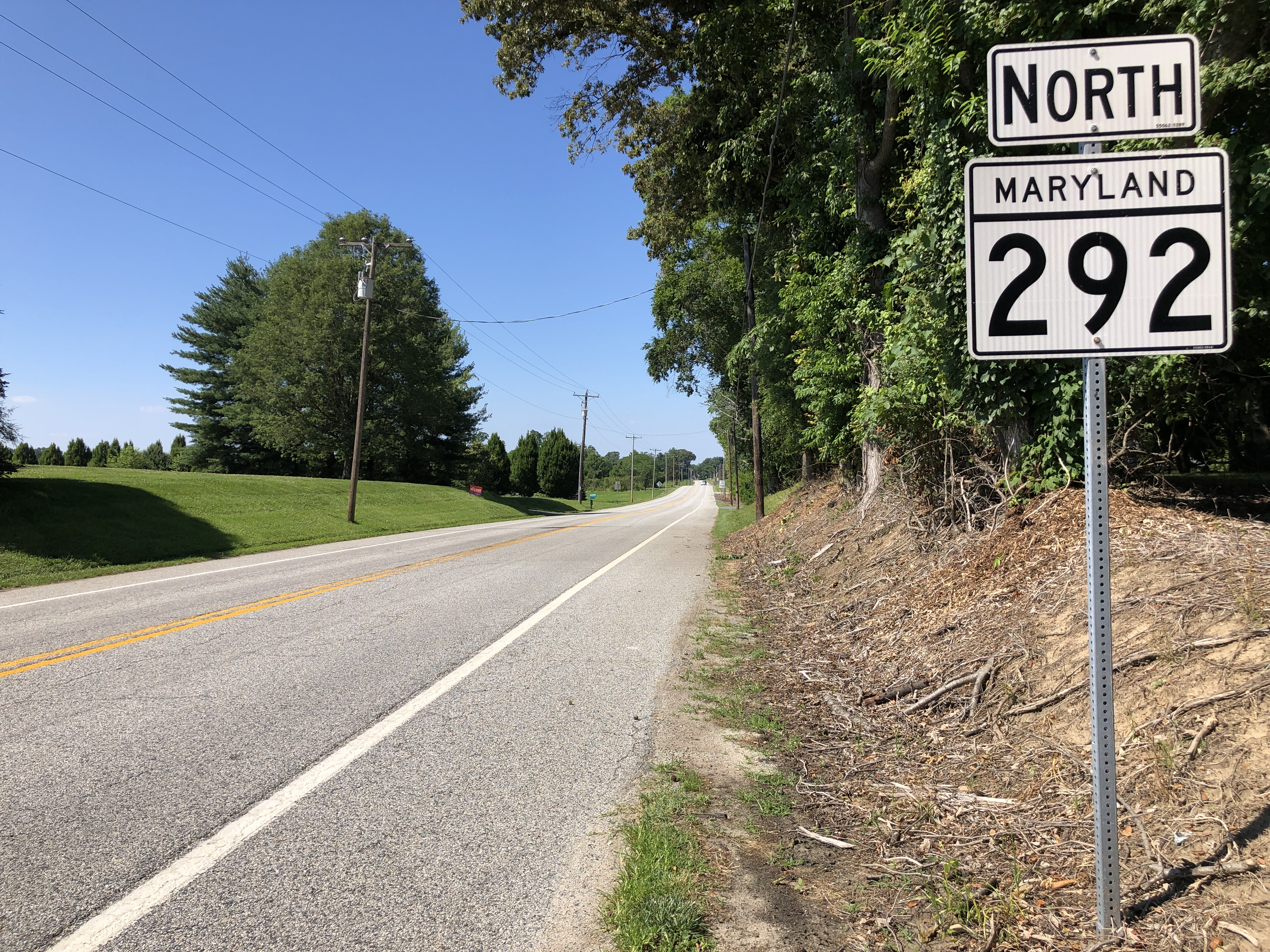
MD 292 northbound past the southern terminus at MD 298 near Still Pond

MD 292 begins at an intersection with MD 298 (Lambs Meadow Road) south of Still Pond. Still Pond Road continues south as a county highway that passes the historic home Shepherd's Delight on its way to MD 213. MD 292 heads north as two-lane undivided Still Pond Road, which passes the historic home Hebron on its way to the village of Still Pond. Within the Still Pond Historic District, the highway turns west at an intersection with the western terminus of MD 566 (Still Pond Harmony Road) and Main Street adjacent to the George Harper Store. MD 292 leaves the village, crosses the headwaters of Stillpond Creek, and curves north at Bessicks Corner Road, a portion of which is unsigned MD 864. The highway's name changes to Main Street upon entering the town of Betterton. MD 292 passes through the Betterton Historic District and makes a sharp turn to the east immediately before reaching its northern terminus at Betterton Beach Park on the Sassafras River where that river enters the Chesapeake Bay.

== History ==
The highway from Betterton through the village of Still Pond to the Still Pond railroad crossing (also known as Hepbron) was originally improved by Kent County with state aid as a 9-foot-wide (2.7 m) macadam road by 1915. The highway was extended south from the railroad to the Chestertown–Galena state road (now MD 213) as a concrete road in 1921 and 1922. The main streets of Betterton and Still Pond were paved with concrete in 1922 and 1923. By 1934, MD 292 from U.S. Route 213 (now MD 213) to Betterton was proposed to be widened from 15 to 16 feet (4.6 to 4.9 m) to 20 feet (6.1 m). The portion of the highway from Still Pond to Betterton was widened in 1948. MD 292 was resurfaced with bituminous concrete from MD 298 to the town limit of Betterton in 1968. This work included the relocation at Bessicks Corner Road, bypassing what is now MD 864. Main Street in Betterton was resurfaced with bituminous concrete in 1976 and reconstructed in a streetscape project in 2002 and 2003. The portion of MD 292 between MD 213 and MD 298 was transferred from state to county maintenance through a November 18, 1994, road transfer agreement.

== Junction list ==
The entire route is in Kent County.

| Location | mi | km | Destinations | Notes |
|---|---|---|---|---|
| Still Pond | 0.00 | 0.00 | MD 298 (Lambs Meadow Road) / Still Pond Road south – Galena, Lynch, Chestertown, Rock Hall | Southern terminus |
| Still Pond | 0.93 | 1.50 | MD 566 east (Still Pond Harmony Road) / Main Street north – Galena | Western terminus of MD 566; MD 292 turns west at this intersection |
| Betterton | 4.58 | 7.37 | Road end at Sassafras River | Northern terminus |
1.000 mi = 1.609 km; 1.000 km = 0.621 mi
