= Maryland Route 566 =

State highway in Maryland, United States

Maryland Route 566
- Stillpond Harmony Road

Route information
- Maintained by MDSHA
- Length: 1.19 mi (1.92 km)
- Existed: 1946–present

Major junctions
- West end: MD 292 in Still Pond
- East end: MD 298 near Still Pond

Location
- Country: United States
- State: Maryland
- Counties: Kent

Highway system
- Maryland highway system; Interstate; US; State; Scenic Byways
← MD 565	→ MD 568

Maryland Route 566 (MD 566) is a state highway in the U.S. state of Maryland. Known as Stillpond Harmony Road, the highway runs 1.19 miles (1.92 km) from MD 292 in Still Pond east to MD 298 near Still Pond in northern Kent County. MD 566 was constructed from Still Pond east to MD 298's intersection with MD 213 in the late 1940s. The highway was relocated in Still Pond in the late 1950s. MD 298 assumed much of MD 566's course in the early 1960s.

== Route description ==
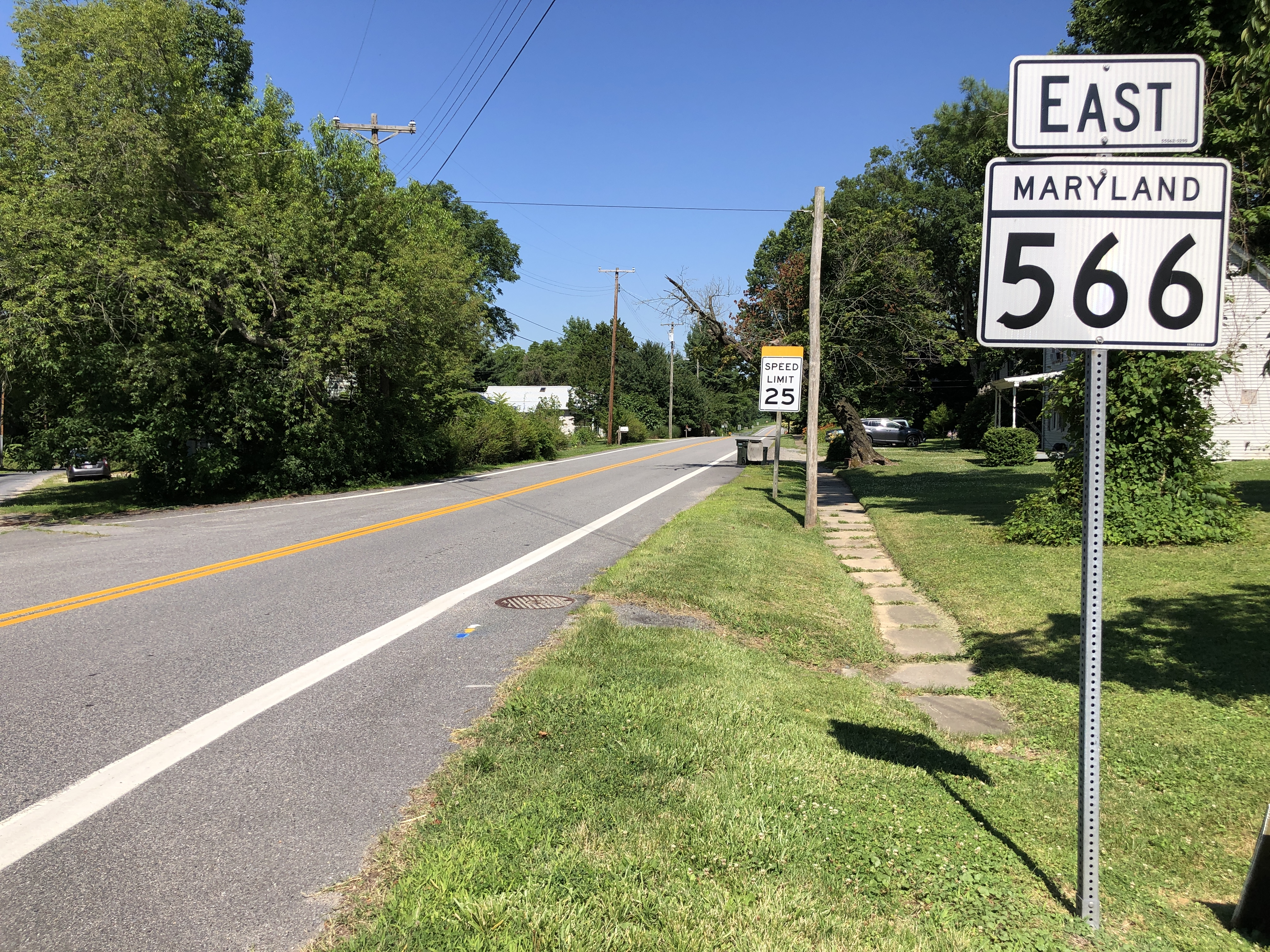
View east along MD 566 at MD 292 in Still Pond

MD 566 begins at an intersection with MD 292 (Still Pond Road) next to the George Harper Store in the Still Pond Historic District. MD 292 heads west from the intersection toward Betterton and south toward MD 298 near Lynch. MD 566 heads east from the village as two-lane undivided Stillpond Harmony Road. The highway reaches its eastern terminus at an acute intersection with MD 298 (Lambs Meadow Road).

== History ==
MD 566 was constructed around 1946 to provide a direct connection between Still Pond and U.S. Route 213 (now MD 213) at Harmony Corner north of Kennedyville. The highway was widened to 20 feet (6.1 m) starting in 1953. MD 566 originally followed Medders Road and the southern end of Rosedale Cannery Road through Still Pond. Those two segments were bypassed when MD 566 was placed on its present, straighter course through Still Pond in 1959. The bypassed route became MD 857. MD 566 was cut to its present length in 1963 when MD 298 was extended east along the stretch of MD 566 east of the two routes' present intersection.

== Junction list ==
The entire route is in Still Pond, Kent County.

mi	km	Destinations	Notes
0.00	0.00	MD 292 (Stillpond Road) – Betterton, Lynch	Western terminus
1.19	1.92	MD 298 (Lambs Meadow Road) – Lynch, Galena	Eastern terminus
1.000 mi = 1.609 km; 1.000 km = 0.621 mi
