= Shepherd House =

Shepherd House may refer to:

- Rayward–Shepherd House, New Canaan, Connecticut
- J. R. Shepherd House, Paris, Idaho
- Earl Shepherd Bungalow, Paris, Idaho, listed on the National Register of Historic Places (NRHP)
- Shepherd Bungalow, Paris, Idaho, listed on the NRHP
- Les and Hazel Shepherd Bungalow, Paris, Idaho, listed on the NRHP
- Ted Shepherd Cottage, Paris, Idaho
- Strawbridge-Shepherd House, Springfield, Illinois
- Shepherd's Delight, Still Pond, Maryland, NRHP-listed, a historic house
- Shepherd House, part of the Parsons, Shepherd, and Damon Houses Historic District, Northampton, Massachusetts
- William Shepherd House, Bath, New York
- Perry-Shepherd Farm, Lansing, North Carolina
- Champion-Shepherdson House, Princeton, Kentucky, NRHP-listed in Caldwell County
- Dr. Warren Shepherd House, Beaver, Utah, listed on the NRHP
- Harriet S. Shepherd House, Beaver, Utah, listed on the NRHP
- Van Swearingen-Shepherd House, Shepherdstown, West Virginia
- Shepherd Hall, Wheeling, West Virginia

== See also ==
- Shepherd Building (disambiguation)
