= Still Pond, Maryland =

- Census-designated place
- Location within Maryland
- Coordinates: 39°19′45″N 76°02′44″W
- Country: United States
- State: Maryland
- County: Kent

Area
  - Total: 0.19 sq mi (0.48 km^{2})
  - Land: 0.19 sq mi (0.48 km^{2})
  - Water: 0 sq mi (0.00 km^{2})
- Elevation: 75 ft (23 m)

Population (2023)
  - Total: 118
  - Density: 707.5/sq mi (273.17/km^{2})
- Time zone: UTC-5 (Eastern (EST))
  - Summer (DST): UTC-4 (EDT)
- ZIP code: 21667
- Area codes: 410, 443, and 667
- GNIS feature ID: 591351

Still Pond is a census-designated place in Kent County, Maryland, United States. Still Pond is located at the intersection of Maryland routes 292 and 566 on Still Pond Neck, south-southeast of Betterton and north of Chestertown. Much of the community is included in the Still Pond Historic District and it is notable as the first place in Maryland in which women gained the right to vote.

In addition to the Still Pond Historic District, the George Harper Store, Hebron, and Shepherd's Delight are listed on the National Register of Historic Places.

Still Pond, formerly an unincorporated community without a census-designated place, received one for the 2020 Census listing a population of 131.

Description: Still Pond Historic District is a rural crossroad community of approximately 75 buildings dating from the early 19th century through the 1930s, located in north-central Kent County at the intersection of Still Pond Road (MD 292) and Old Still Pond Road (MD 566). The five-point intersection of Still Pond Road, Main Street, Medders Road, and Old Still Pond Road forms the core of the small town, with the residential streets of Maple Avenue and Trustee Street located north and east of the town's center. The district is surrounded by agricultural fields, with minimal modern development. The majority of the resources within the district are free-standing, single-family dwellings. The district also includes several historic commercial properties, including several stores, a warehouse, and a former post office building. Community resources include two churches with associated cemeteries, a stand-alone cemetery, a former Odd Fellows Hall, and a former schoolhouse. Most principal facades face the roadways. Older properties in the center of town are located close to the road, while large houses further outside town are set back on their lots. Concrete sidewalks have been installed along portions of Still Pond Road and Old Still Pond Road. A few properties are fronted by fencing or hedges, and most residential yards contain ornamental landscaping and mature vegetation. Most dwellings within the district are rural examples of late-19th-century and early-20th-century architecture. There are several houses built in Victorian, Colonial Revival, and Craftsman styles, however the majority of houses are vernacular building forms with decorative elements of these popular national styles. The district displays the variation of features that occur within styles and also shows the transitions between styles. Several properties contain historic outbuildings, sheds, or garages.

Significance: The Still Pond Historic District is historically significant, as a town reflective of the historical development of rural communities on Maryland's Upper Eastern Shore. Located at a crossroads surrounded by family farms, the town served as a commercial hub and center of community life. The district derives additional historical significance as the first place in Maryland that women gained the right to vote. In addition, Still Pond Historic District has architectural significance, embodying distinctive characteristics of types, periods, and methods of construction of architecture, as it contains numerous examples of Victorian, Colonial Revival, and Craftsman styles, as well as vernacular building forms. The district displays the variation of features that occur within styles and also shows the transitions between styles. The district possesses a significant concentration of buildings that are united historically and aesthetically by physical development. The interrelationship of the district's resources conveys a visual sense of the overall historic environment. Within the district, a number of individually distinctive resources, such as the Still Pond Methodist Church (K-434), the George Harper Store (K-432), and the Medders-Krebs House (K-437), serve as focal points for the district. The oldest buildings in the district were constructed in the early 19th century. The majority of the town's structures were in place by the end of the 1930s, and the district had substantially achieved its historic character and appearance.

source: https://mht.maryland.gov/nr/NRDetail.aspx?NRID=1566#:~:text=Description%3A%20Still%20Pond%20Historic%20District,Pond%20Road%20(MD%20566).

credits: mht.Maryland.gov

== Education ==
It is in the Kent County Public Schools. Kent County Middle School is in Chestertown, and Kent County High School is in an unincorporated area, in the Butlertown census-designated place with a Worton postal address.

The community was formerly assigned to Worton Elementary School. In 2017 the school board voted to close Worton Elementary.

== Demographics ==
Historical population
Census	Pop.	Note	%±
2020	131		—
U.S. Decennial Census; 2020

Still Pond first appeared as a census designated place in the 2020 U.S. census.

=== 2020 census ===
Still Pond, Maryland CDP - Demographic Profile (NH = Non-Hispanic)
Race / Ethnicity	Pop 2020	% 2020
White alone (NH)	122	93.13%
Black or African American alone (NH)	1	0.76%
Native American or Alaska Native alone (NH)	0	0.00%
Asian alone (NH)	0	0.00%
Pacific Islander alone (NH)	0	0.00%
Some Other Race alone (NH)	1	0.76%
Mixed Race/Multi-Racial (NH)	6	4.58%
Hispanic or Latino (any race)	1	0.76%
Total	131	100.00%

Note: the US Census treats Hispanic/Latino as an ethnic category. This table excludes Latinos from the racial categories and assigns them to a separate category. Hispanics/Latinos can be of any race.

== Notable people ==
- Ryan Grim (born 1978), journalist, author, and co-founder of Strong Arm Press.
- George Hepbron (1863–1946) wrote basketball's first book titled How to Play Basketball.
