= Dr. George Ashley House =

Historic house in Idaho, United States

- U.S. National Register of Historic Places
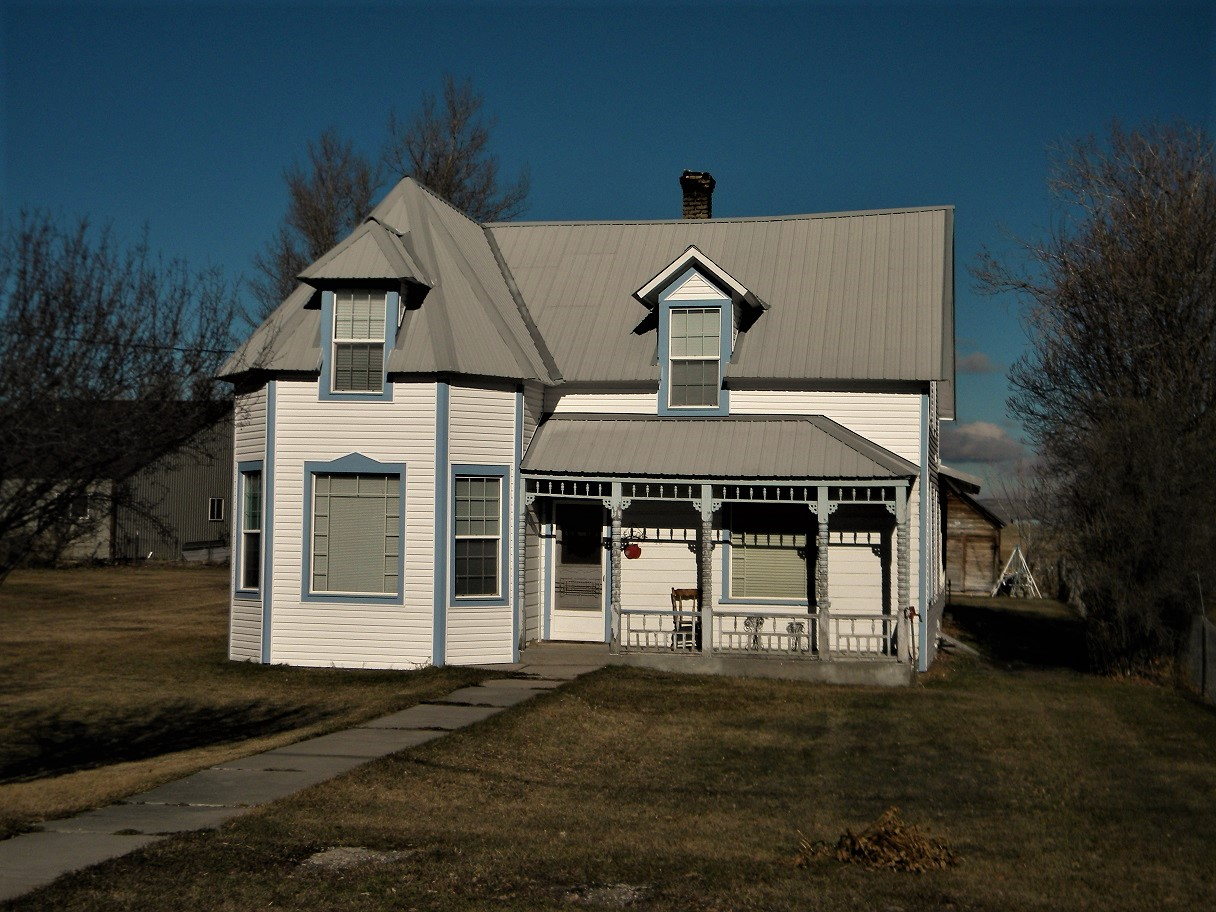

- Location within Idaho Location within the United States
- Location: 40 W. 2nd, North; Paris, Idaho
- Coordinates: 42°13′53″N 111°24′6″W
- Area: less than one acre
- Architectural style: Queen Anne
- MPS: Paris MRA
- NRHP reference No.: 82000261
- Added to NRHP: November 18, 1982

The Dr. George Ashley House is a historic house located at 40 W. 2nd North in Paris, Idaho. The house was built in the early 1890s for Dr. George Ashley, Jr., a local physician who established the Bear Lake Valley's first hospital. The house's Queen Anne design was likely inspired by Paris' J. R. Shepherd House. The front porch features an Eastlake-inspired spindlework balustrade and eave, pierced brackets, and ring-and-ball supporting columns. The ell to the left of the front door has a tent roof, an uncommon roof form for an ell-shaped frame house.

The house was added to the National Register of Historic Places on November 18, 1982.
