= George T. Hepbron =

American basketball referee

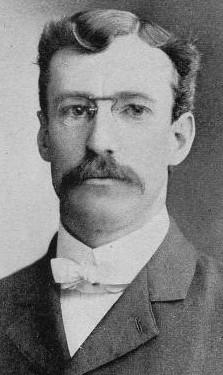
Hepborn, circa 1904

George T. Hepbron (August 27, 1864 – April 30, 1946) was a basketball referee. He is credited with writing the game's first book, How to Play Basketball, in 1904.

Hepbron was born in Still Pond, Maryland. He was a close friend of James Naismith, and subsequently played a major role in the early development of the game, especially in the area of rules. Hepbron held leadership roles with the Amateur Athletic Union Basketball Committee (1896) and the National Basketball Rules Committee (1915–1933).

He died in Newark, New Jersey, and was enshrined in the Naismith Memorial Basketball Hall of Fame in 1960 as a referee.
