= Sam Athay House =

Historic house in Idaho, United States

- U.S. National Register of Historic Places
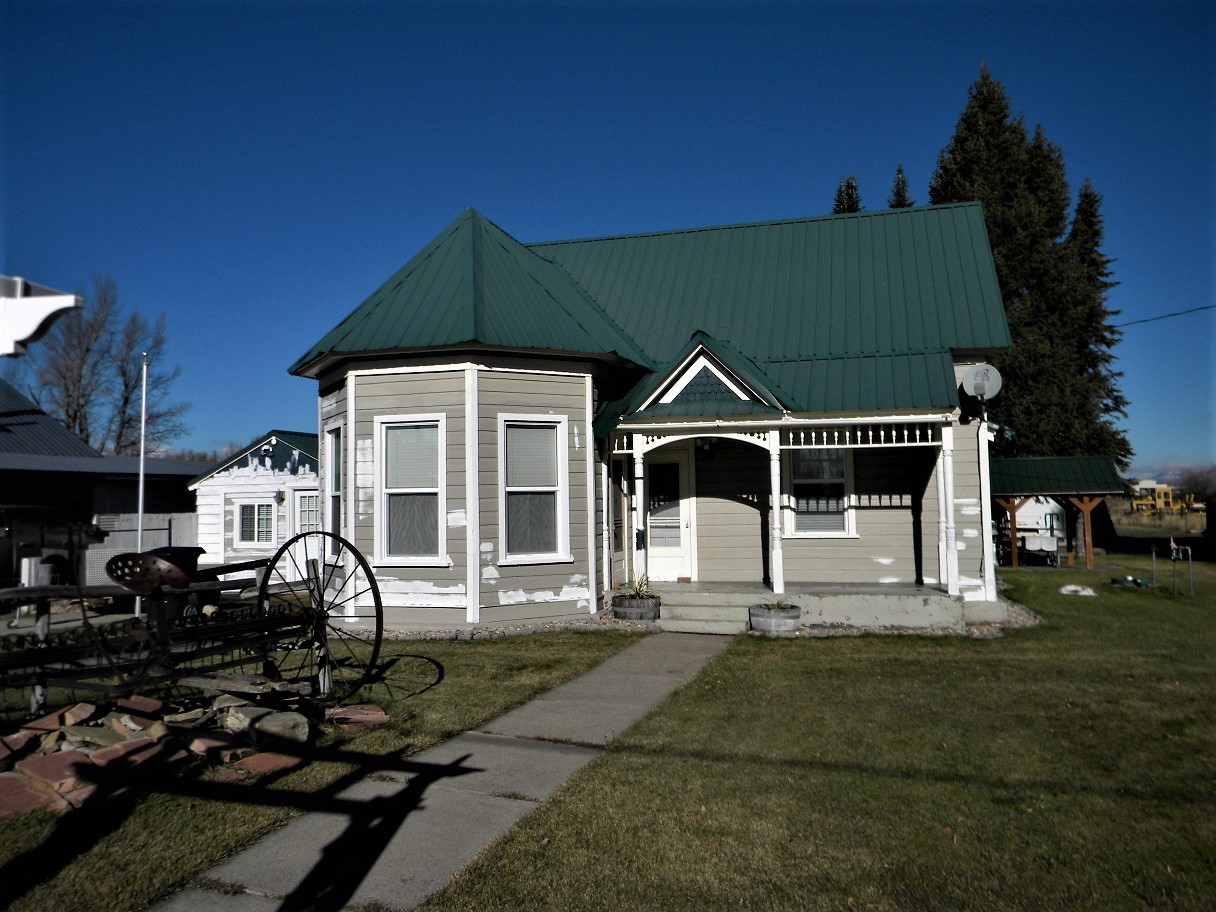

- Location within Idaho Location within the United States
- Location: 20 W. 2nd North; Paris, Idaho
- Coordinates: 42°13′54″N 111°24′4″W
- Area: less than one acre
- MPS: Paris MRA
- NRHP reference No.: 82004939
- Added to NRHP: November 18, 1982

The Sam Athay House, located in Paris, Idaho, was listed on the National Register of Historic Places in 1982.

It was deemed "architecturally significant for its relatively unusual shape and distinct but-modest Queen Anne tendencies. Its design nearly follows that of the J. R. Shepherd house with octagonal projection, spindled porch, tapered posts and pedimental overdoor."
