= Shepherd Building =

Shepherd Building may refer to:

- Shepherd Building (Montgomery, Alabama), listed on the National Register of Historic Places (NRHP) in Montgomery County, Alabama
- Shepherd Building Group, York, England
- Shepherd Hardware, Paris, Idaho, NRHP-listed in Bear Lake County
- Shepherd Building (Shreveport, Louisiana), listed on the National Register of Historic Places in Caddo Parish, Louisiana
- Shepard Company Building, Providence, Rhode Island, listed on the National Register of Historic Places in Providence, Rhode Island
- Shepherd's Mill, Shepherdstown, West Virginia, NRHP-listed
- Shepherd Hall, Wheeling, West Virginia, NRHP-listed

== See also ==
- Shepherd House (disambiguation)
