= Hebron (Still Pond, Maryland) =

Historic house in Maryland, United States

- U.S. National Register of Historic Places
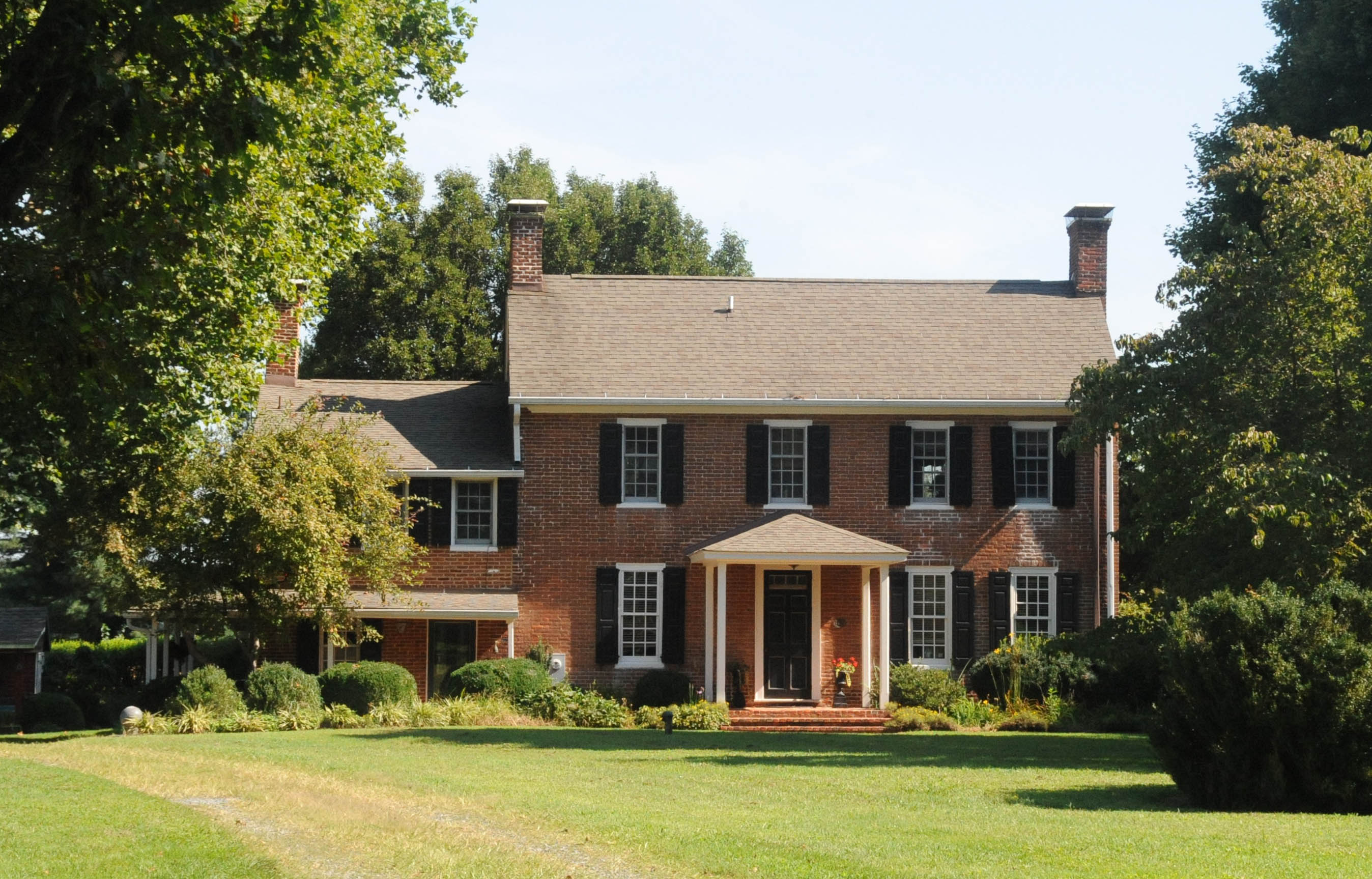

- Location within Maryland Location within the United States
- Nearest city: Still Pond, Maryland
- Coordinates: 39°19′23″N 76°2′24″W
- Built: 1770
- NRHP reference No.: 78001471
- Added to NRHP: September 18, 1978

Hebron is a historic home located near Still Pond, Kent County, Maryland. It is a two-story brick farmhouse probably constructed in the mid to late 18th century by members of a prominent Kent County Quaker family.

It was listed on the National Register of Historic Places in 1978.
