= J. R. Shepherd House =

Historic house in Idaho, United States

- U.S. National Register of Historic Places
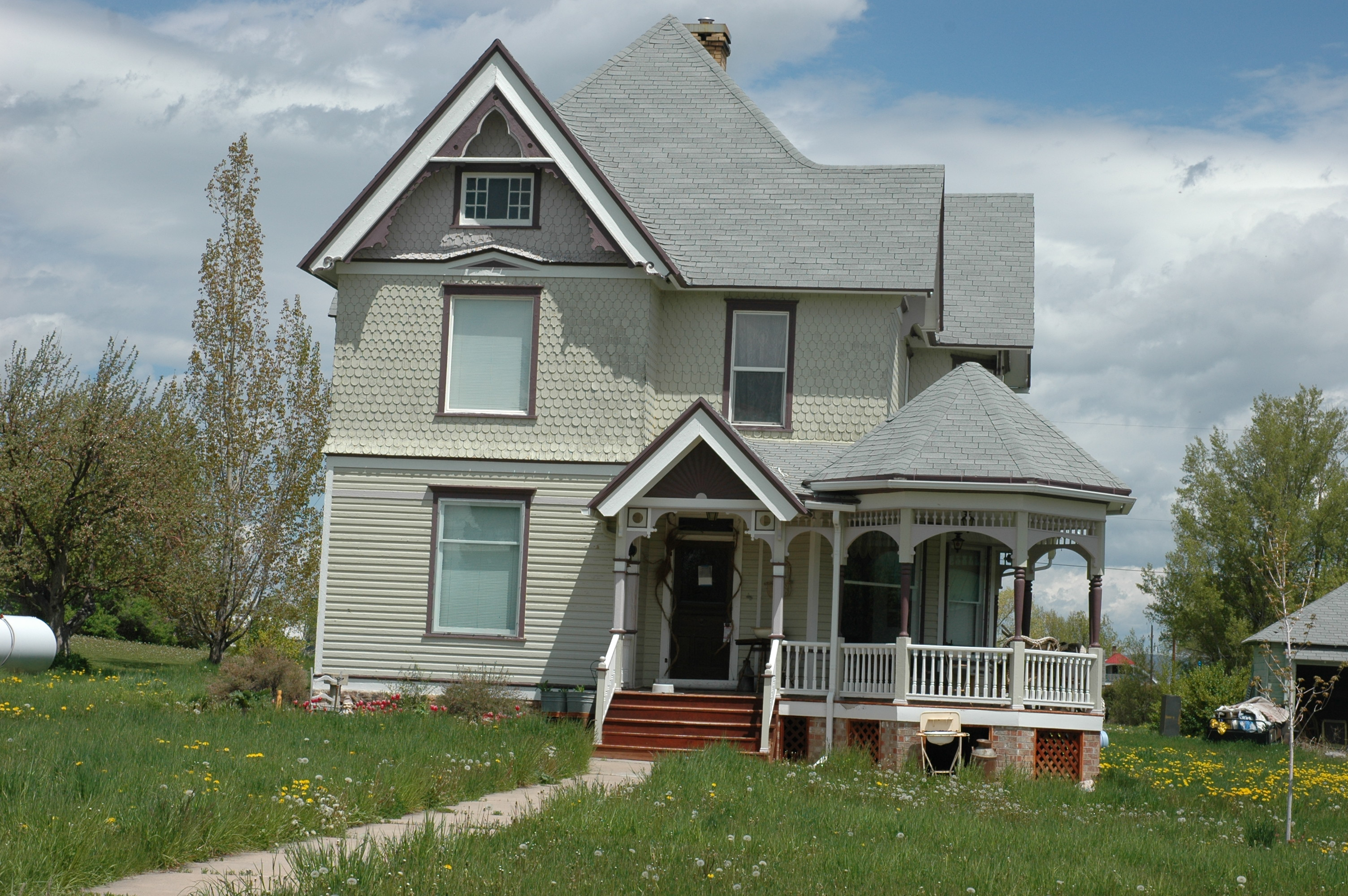

- Location within Idaho Location within the United States
- Location: 58 W. Center St., Paris, Idaho
- Coordinates: 42°13′39″N 111°24′7″W
- Area: less than one acre
- Built: 1890
- Architectural style: Queen Anne
- MPS: Paris MRA
- NRHP reference No.: 82000305
- Added to NRHP: November 18, 1982

The J. R. Shepherd House, at 58 W. Center St. in Paris, Idaho is a historic Queen Anne style house that was built in 1890. The house has been called the most architecturally exquisite in Paris, and it is the largest Queen Anne house in the city. Builder H. R. Shepherd built the house in 1890 for his brother J.R., a local businessman who ran the city's Mercantile Store. The house's design inspired other city residents to construct Queen Anne homes; one of these, the Dr. George Ashley House, is also listed on the National Register.

The design of the Sam Athay House, also NRHP-listed, also follows the design here.

The house was listed on the National Register of Historic Places in 1982.
