= Sassafras River =

Tributary of the Chesapeake Bay on the Delmarva Peninsula in the United States

Sassafras River Tributary to Chesapeake Bay
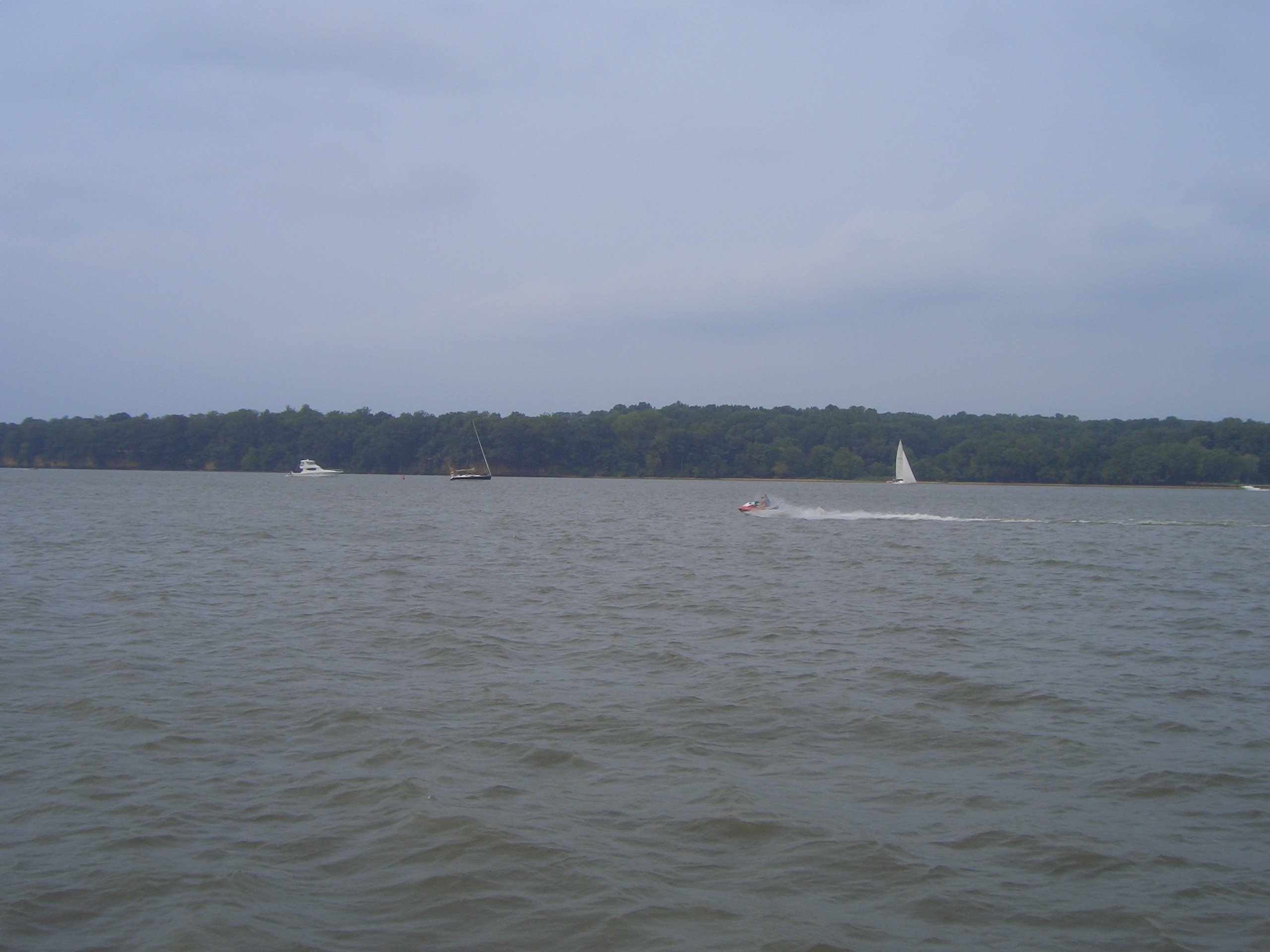
- A view of the Sassafras on a windy day with the northern shore in the background

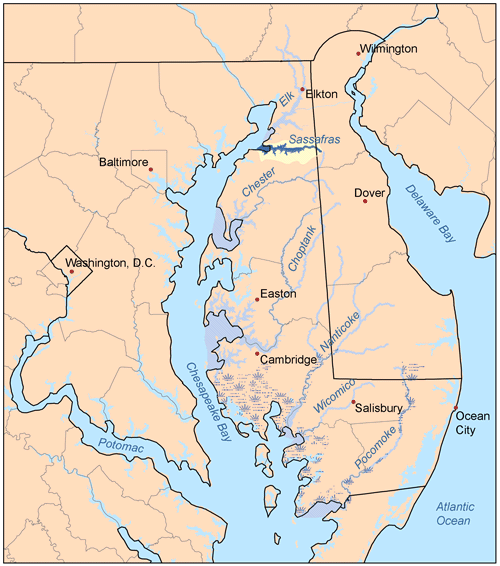
- The Sassafras River and its watershed is highlighted in yellow on this map of the rivers of the Eastern Shore of Maryland

Location
- Country: United States
- State: Maryland; Delaware
- Counties: Cecil (MD); Kent (MD); New Castle (DE)

Physical characteristics
- Source: divide between Sassafras River and Blackbird Creek
  - location: about 0.5 miles ENE of Vandyke, Delaware
  - coordinates: 39°21′54″N 075°43′59″W
  - elevation: 80 ft (24 m)
- Mouth: Chesapeake Bay
  - location: Betterton, Maryland
  - coordinates: 39°23′14″N 076°03′13″W
  - elevation: 0 ft (0 m)
- Length: 18.98 mi (30.55 km)
- Basin size: 91.88 square miles (238.0 km^{2})
- Discharge
  - location: Chesapeake Bay
  - average: 109.27 cu ft/s (3.094 m^{3}/s) at mouth with Chesapeake Bay

Basin features
- Progression: Chesapeake Bay → Atlantic Ocean
- River system: Chesapeake Bay
- Tributaries
  - left: Herring Branch; Jacobs Creek; Swantown Creek; Mill Creek; Dyer Creek; Woodland Creek; Freeman Creek; Turner Creek; Lloyd Creek
  - right: Duffy Creek; Hen Island Creek; Hall Creek; Back Creek; Foreman Creek; Cox Creek; Money Creek

The Sassafras River is a tributary of the Chesapeake Bay on the Delmarva Peninsula in the United States. It is approximately 22 miles (35 km) long and starts in western New Castle County, Delaware, and along the boundary between Cecil County, Maryland on the north and Kent County, Maryland on the south. It rises southwest of Middletown, Delaware and ends at the Chesapeake Bay in a wide mouth between Howell Point near Betterton, Maryland and Grove Point on Grove Neck.

It is south of the Elk River and north of the Chester River. The Sassafras River is entirely within the coastal plain. Its watershed area (including the water surface) is 97 square miles (250 km^{2}), with 83 square miles (210 km^{2}) of land. Thus, its total watershed area is 14% water.

There are several small creeks on the northern shore of the Sassafras River, including Money Creek, Cox Creek, Foreman Creek, Back Creek, McGill Creek, Dowdel Creek, Hall Creek, and Duffy Creek. On the southern shore small creeks include Lloyd Creek, Turner's Creek, Freeman Creek, Woodland Creek, Dyer Creek, Mill Creek, Swantown Creek, Jacobs Creek, and Herring Branch.

On the 1612 John Smith map of the area, it was called the Tockwogh River.

== Parks along the river ==
Several government-managed parks may be found on the southern shores of the river, some are national, some state, and some county parks. They range from historical and recreational parks to natural resource management areas and wildlife preserves. An entire peninsula along the southern shore of the river containing several large farms and a large pond was assembled into one property on which Liz Maytag and Mike Revuke lived. Following their deaths, it was donated for preservation as a wildlife sanctuary. They also were owners of The Granary, a marina and restaurant at Georgetown.

== Boating ==
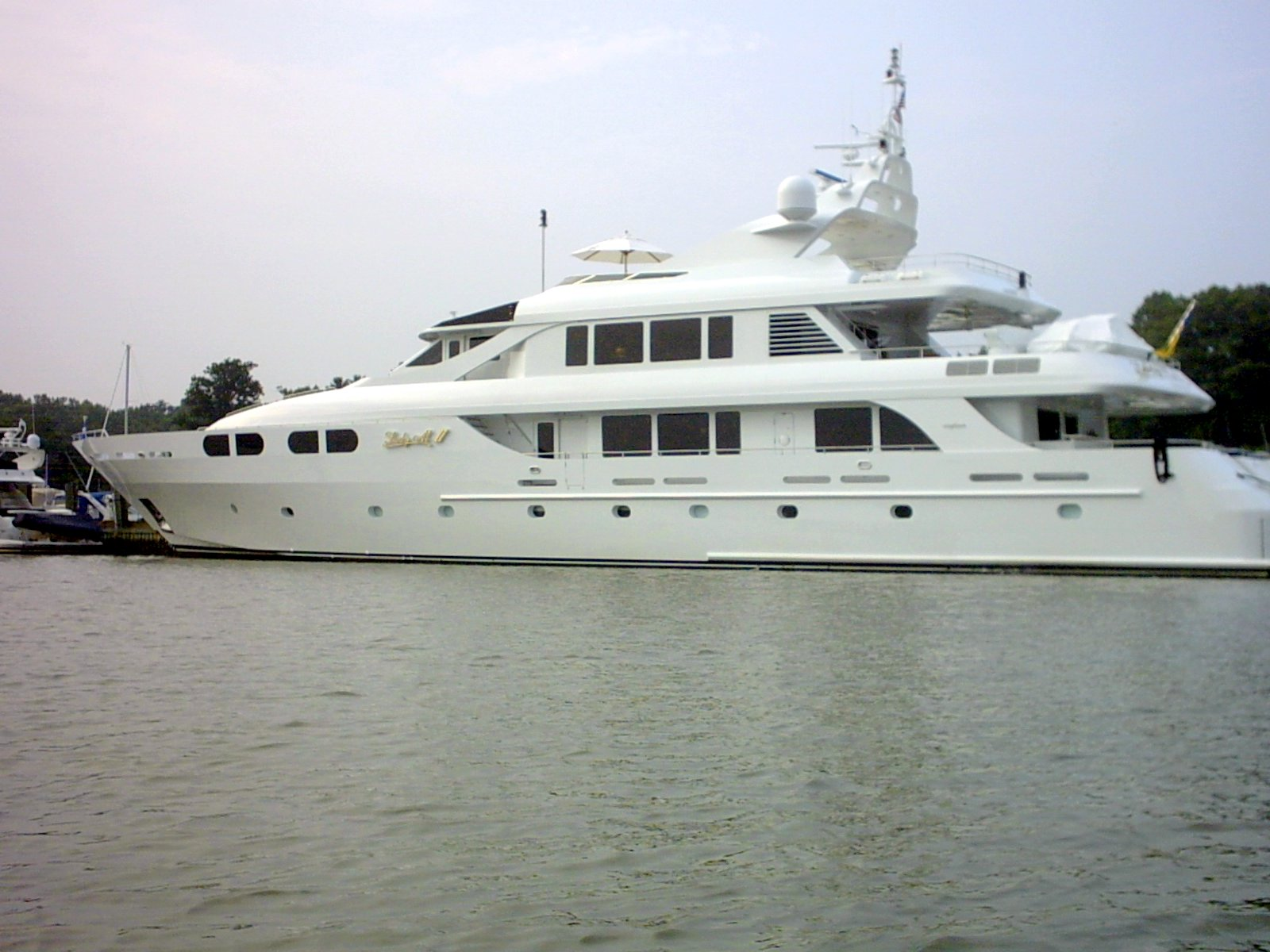
A large motoryacht docked at Skipjack Marina

The Sassafras River is home to many boats and four large marinas, all of which are located near Georgetown, Maryland (map).

The channel, marked by buoys, is at leastdge for Maryland Route 213. The deepest portion of the Sassafras is just about in the middle of the river, east of buoy 5 on the tip of Ordinary Point. There, the depth reaches more than 50 feet (15 m). Farther upriver, the river soon becomes too shallow for even the smallest runabout or personal water craft. The water there is only suitable for kayaks or canoes.

Despite the depths of the upper Sassafras, the lower portion of the river always is buzzing with boats during the weekends. There are many small bow-riders, cruisers, sailboats of all kinds, and occasionally, one may spot a large motor yacht. Most of the boats come from the marinas, but there are a number that come from private piers, most of which are on the southern side of the river. There are a number of beaches along the river where boaters may anchor and swim, or they may choose to ski or tube in one of the river's many creeks and coves where wakes can be avoided as much as possible.

Most of the piers along the river are fixed, as opposed to floating, with the exception of some of the marinas. This is because of the wakes, which can reach 2 feet (0.61 m) on a busy day. The marinas are protected to a certain degree because of the no wake zone (where boats may not exceed 5 mph), with the exception of Gregg Neck Boat Yard which extends from buoy 12 to just east of the 213 drawbridge. Also, some of the boat owners along the river who have private piers have decided to install boat lifts to lift their boats out of the water and away from the wakes.

== See also ==
- List of rivers of Delaware
- Tockwogh
