= George Harper Store =

- U.S. National Register of Historic Places
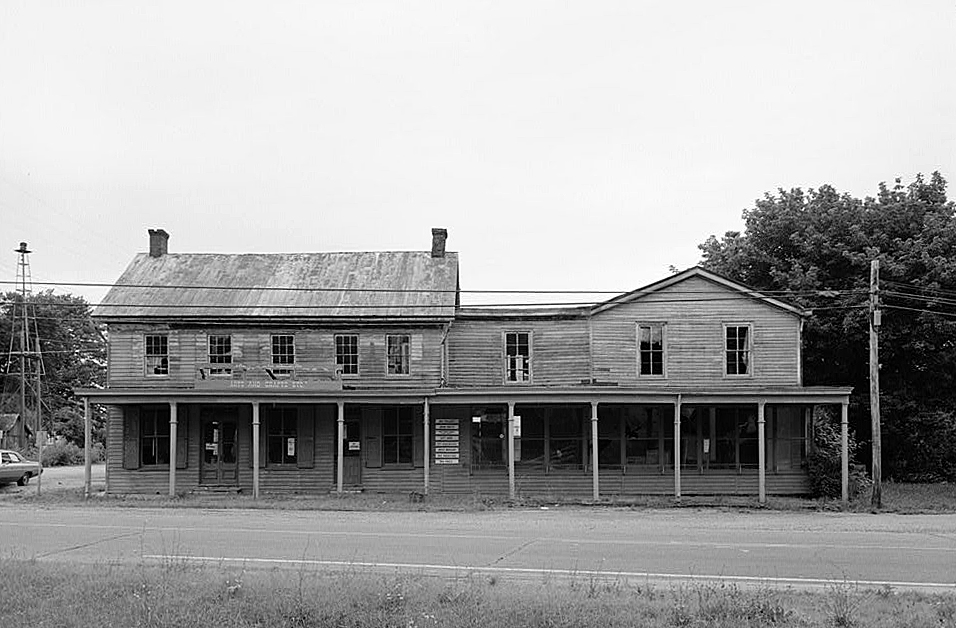
- George Harper Store in 1975

- Location within Maryland Location within the United States
- Location: MD 292 and Main St., Still Pond, Maryland
- Coordinates: 39°19′38″N 76°2′41″W
- Built: 1877
- NRHP reference No.: 82002816
- Added to NRHP: July 09, 1982

The George Harper Store is a historic crossroads general store located in Still Pond, Kent County, Maryland, united States. It is a late 19th-century five-bay frame commercial structure, two stories high with a central entrance and gable roof. Attached to it is a series of later additions, believed to date from about the turn of the 20th century. It operated as a store from 1894 to 1959.

The George Harper Store was listed on the National Register of Historic Places in 1982.
