= Still Pond Historic District =

Historic house in Maryland, United States

- U.S. National Register of Historic Places
- U.S. Historic district
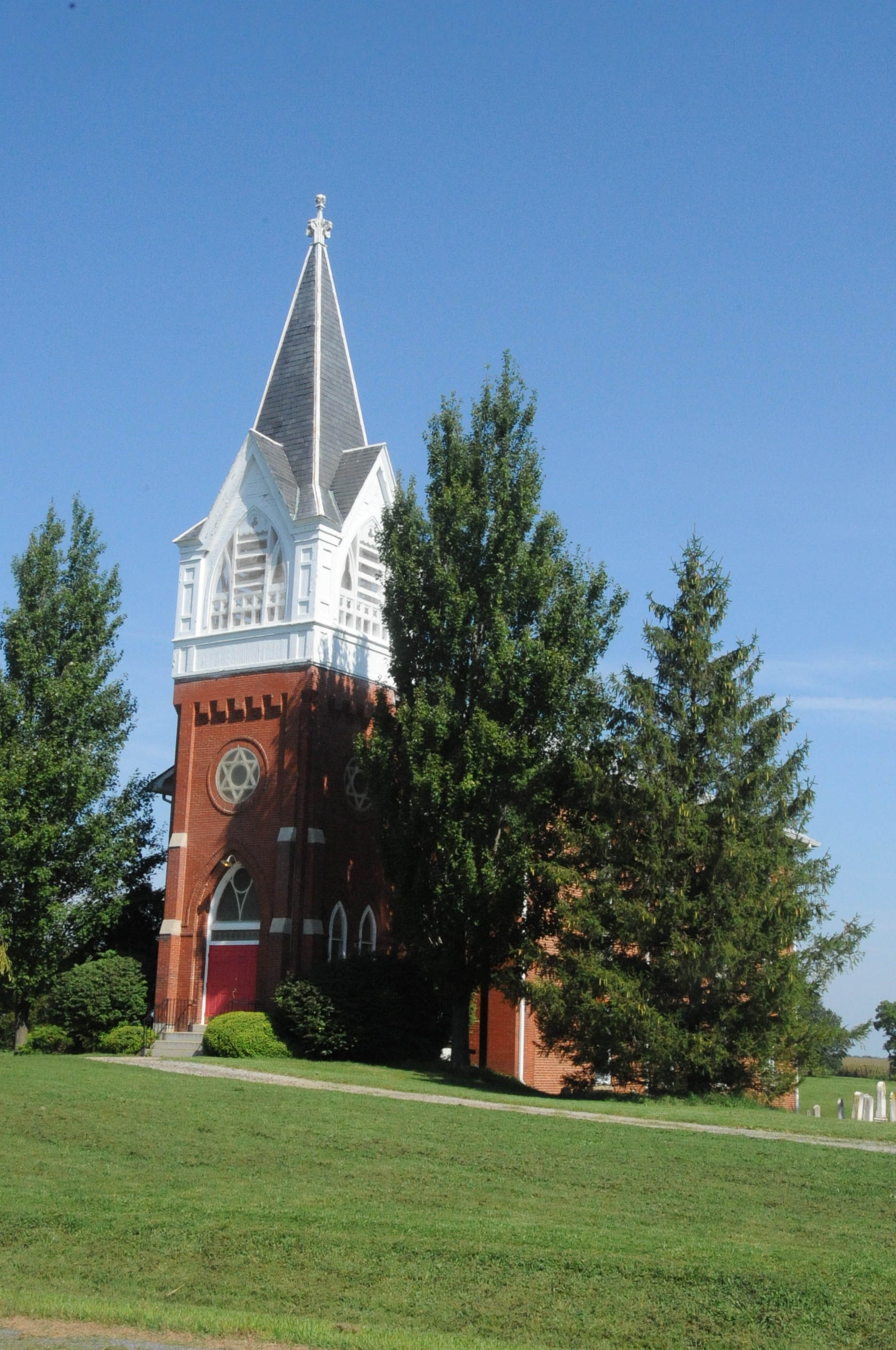
- Methodist Church

- Location within Maryland Location within the United States
- Nearest city: Still Pond Road, Old Still Pond Road, Main Street, Medders Road, Maple Avenue, Trustee Street, Still Pond, Maryland
- Coordinates: 39°19′42″N 76°2′40″W
- NRHP reference No.: 09000645
- Added to NRHP: August 26, 2009

Still Pond Historic District is a national historic district located at Still Pond in Kent County, Maryland, United States. The district contains approximately 75 buildings dating from the early 19th century through the 1930s. Notable structures include the Still Pond Methodist Church, the George Harper Store, the Medders-Krebs House, a former Odd Fellows Hall, and a former schoolhouse.

It was listed on the National Register of Historic Places in 2009.
