= Shepherd's Delight =

Historic house in Maryland, United States

- U.S. National Register of Historic Places
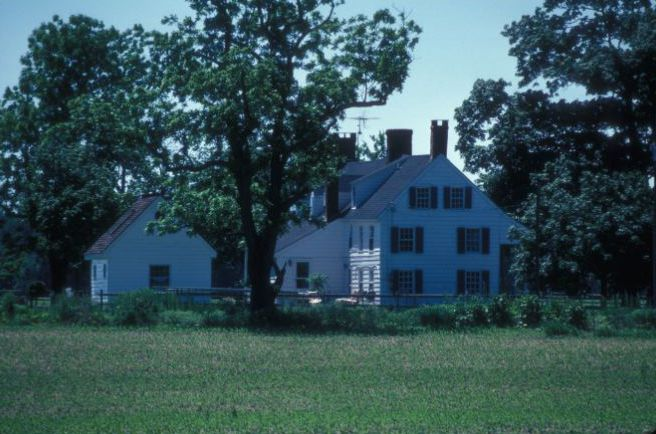

- Location within Maryland Location within the United States
- Location: South of Still Pond on Maryland Route 292, near Still Pond, Maryland
- Coordinates: 39°17′58″N 76°2′22″W
- Built: 1767
- NRHP reference No.: 76001007
- Added to NRHP: June 17, 1976

Shepherd's Delight, also known as the House on Part of Camelsworthmore, is a historic home located near Still Pond, Kent County, Maryland. It has a four-bay-long, 1 1/2-story main section with porches both front and back, and a four-bay-long, 2 1/2-story kitchen wing. It was built between 1767 and 1783, and added to again about 1810. Also on the property are two barns and a brick stable with modern sheds attached.

It was listed on the National Register of Historic Places in 1976.
