= Betterton, Maryland =

Historic district in Maryland, United States

- Town
- Flag Seal

- Location of Betterton, Maryland
- Coordinates: 39°22′4″N 76°3′39″W
- Country: United States
- State: Maryland
- County: Kent
- Incorporated: 1906

Government
  - Type: Mayor-Council
  - Mayor: Donald E. Sutton

Area
  - Total: 1.00 sq mi (2.58 km^{2})
  - Land: 0.99 sq mi (2.56 km^{2})
  - Water: 0.0077 sq mi (0.02 km^{2})
- Elevation: 72 ft (22 m)

Population (2020)
  - Total: 286
  - Density: 288.9/sq mi (111.54/km^{2})
- Time zone: UTC-5 (Eastern (EST))
  - Summer (DST): UTC-4 (EDT)
- ZIP code: 21610
- Area code: 410
- FIPS code: 24-07200
- GNIS feature ID: 0583196
- Website: townofbetterton.com

- Betterton Historic District
- U.S. National Register of Historic Places
- U.S. Historic district
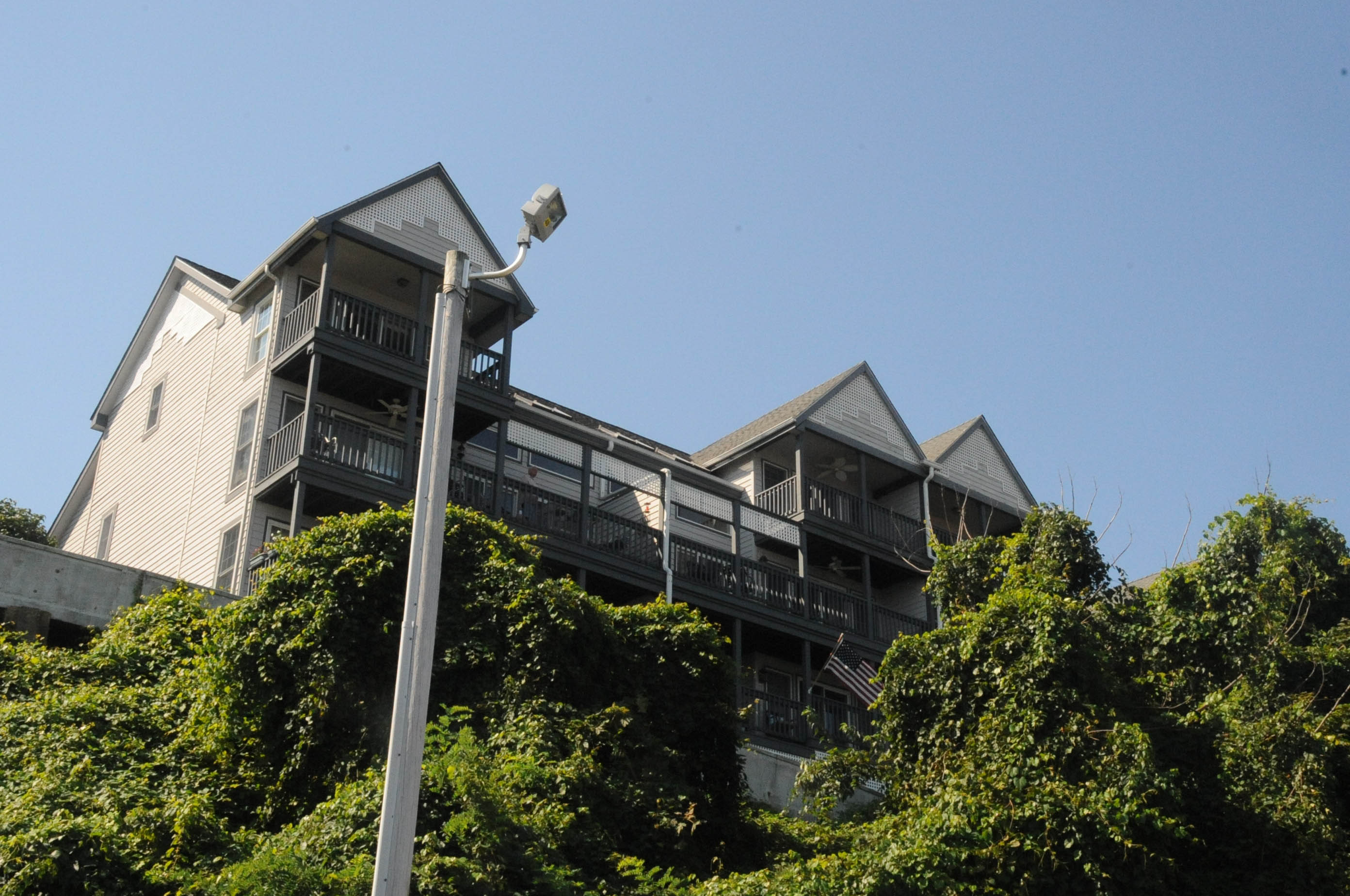
- Rigbie Hotel

- Location within Maryland Location within the United States
- Location: Roughly bounded by Sassafras River, Gut Marsh, 6th, and Ericsson Aves., Betterton, Maryland
- Coordinates: 39°22′2″N 76°3′47″W
- Built: 1880
- Architectural style: Gothic
- NRHP reference No.: 84001805
- Added to NRHP: June 7, 1984

Betterton is a town in Kent County, Maryland, United States. As of the 2020 census, Betterton had a population of 286.

== Geography ==
Betterton is located at the mouth of the Sassafras River on the upper Chesapeake Bay in Kent County, Maryland, on the Eastern Shore region of the Bay and Delmarva Peninsula in the Eastern United States). The GPS coordinates are 39°22′4″N 76°3′39″W (39.367863, -76.060877).

According to the United States Census Bureau, the town has a total area of 1.00 square mile (2.59 km^{2}), of which 0.99 square miles (2.56 km^{2}) is land and 0.01 square miles (0.03 km^{2}) is water.

== Betterton Historic District ==
The Betterton Historic District consists of a collection of vernacular Victorian era-style wooden frame resort structures. The district includes many of the homes, hotels and cottages built to accommodate steamboat passengers in the late 19th and early 20th centuries. Notable buildings within the district include the hotels and boarding homes which catered to the steamboat passengers, several churches, and summer cottages, dating from the golden age of the passenger steamboats on the Chesapeake Bay.

It was added to the National Register of Historic Places, (maintained by the National Park Service of the United States Department of the Interior) in 1984.

== History ==
The recorded history of Betterton dates back to the 17th century. The Fishall Patent was granted in 1664, later becoming known as Fish Hall. The house located at 104 Ericsson Avenue contains foundation bricks dating back to 1698. In 1715, Edward Crew leased Fish Hall and the name was changed to Crews Landing. For the next 100 years, Crews Landing was a small fishing village and then later a port for the waterborne transport of local farm produce to urban markets. In 1851, Richard Townsend Turner (a Quaker) named the town “Betterton” after the family of his wife Elizabeth Betterton. The Turner pier, and later the Ericsson pier, provided access to the town for the shipping trade. Eventually townspeople rented out rooms to the travelers, salesmen, and shippers attracted to the beach. Mr. Turner built the Rigbie Hotel (demolished in August 1986) and Mr. Crownhart built the Belmont Hotel (destroyed by fire in 1956). These were joined by such lodging establishments as the Betterton, the Chesapeake, the Country Cousin, the Southern, and many others.

Steamboat traffic from downtown Baltimore's "The Basin" (now Inner Harbor) and Philadelphia on the excursion cruises like the Old Bay Line (Baltimore Steam Packet Company, 1840-1962) and the competing Ericsson Line (and others, such as the Wilson Line later) brought the visitors and vacationers from the Middle Atlantic cities. The Ericsson Line was named after John Ericsson (1803-1889), the Swedish-American inventor of the "screw propeller" (and of Civil War revolutionary naval Ironclad warships) to more speedily and efficiently power ships. It was this invention that allowed steamboats to be built with narrow enough beam to allow them to traverse the recently opened Chesapeake and Delaware Canal then only 25 feet wide (before it was later widened and improved), connecting the upper Chesapeake with the Delaware River and Bay. Betterton was an easy and natural stop for boats using the canal and the explosion in steamboat traffic along the American East Coast brought growth and prosperity to Betterton. For some time before the turn of the 20th century, there were 11 scheduled steamboat landings daily at Betterton's piers. The boom period for Betterton is generally thought to be from 1918 to 1930, when increasing numbers of restaurants, taverns, dance halls, bowling alleys, and amusement arcades all helped create the bayside town's pleasure resort image.

It eventually declined along with neighboring competing Tolchester and Tolchester Beach after the 1949-1952 construction of the Chesapeake Bay Bridge from Annapolis to Kent Island and increasing automobile traffic over improved U.S. Route and Interstate Highway systems in following decades to North Atlantic Ocean beaches and growing resort towns there like Ocean City, Maryland and Rehoboth Beach, Delaware

== Government ==
Betterton is governed by a mayor and a town council with four members. Town council meetings are held on the second and fourth Tuesday of every month at 7:00 pm in the town hall. The town hall is located in the Betterton Community Center, a former Catholic church refurbished as town offices and a museum, on Main Street.

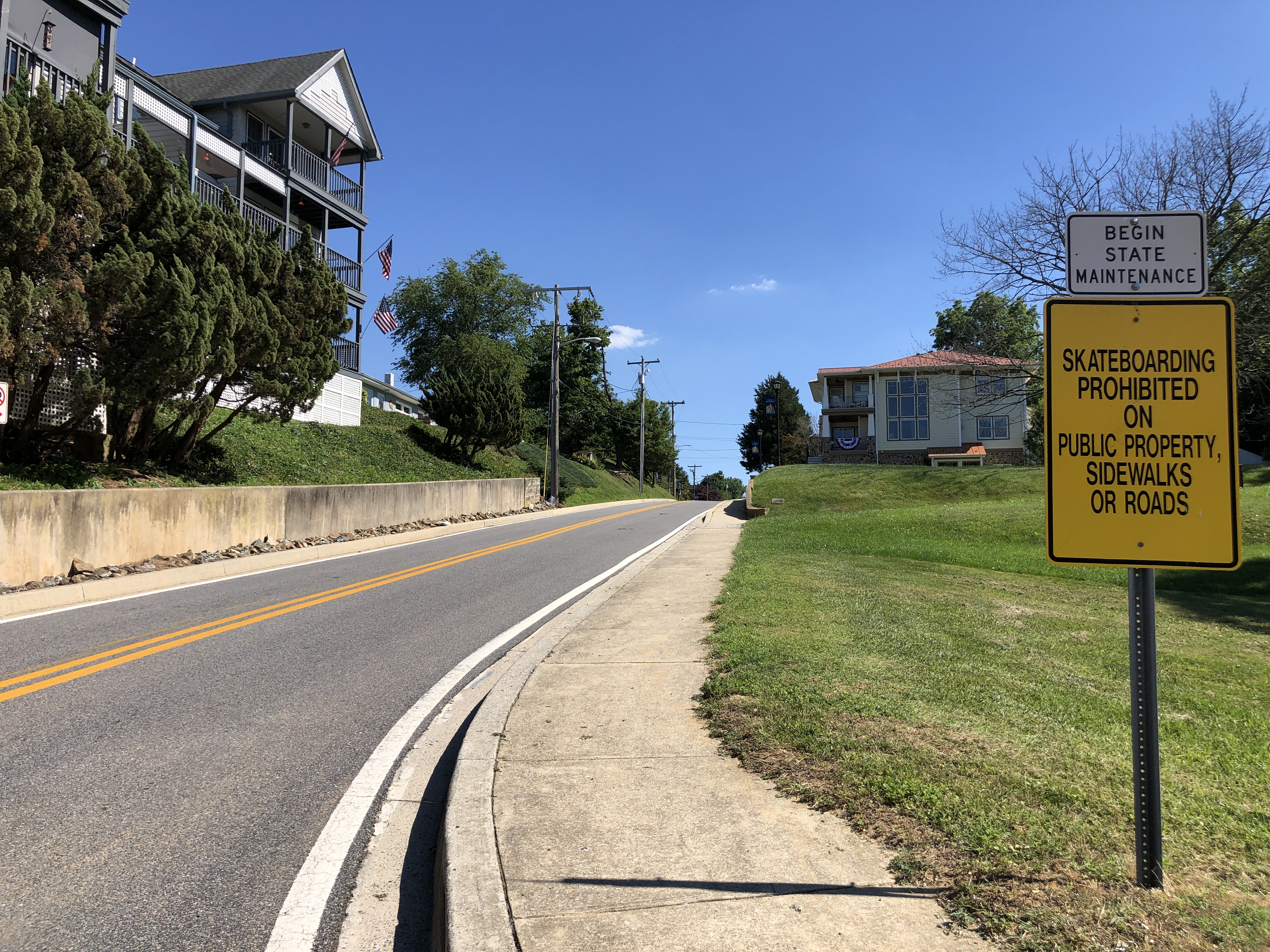
View south at the north end of MD 292 in Betterton

== Transportation ==
The primary means of travel to and from Betterton is by road. The only state highway serving the town is Maryland Route 292, which has its northern terminus at the north end of town.

== Betterton Beach ==
Betterton Beach is located at the foot of Main Street. The beach has 300 feet (91 m) of frontage for swimming. The water is generally free of sea nettles because the water is not very salty. The beach has public restrooms (seasonal), a boardwalk, a fishing jetty, a public landing, and reasonable parking. A picnic pavilion is nearby.

== Demographics ==
Historical population
Census	Pop.	Note	%±
1910	308		—
1920	327		6.2%
1930	296		−9.5%
1940	221		−25.3%
1950	314		42.1%
1960	328		4.5%
1970	327		−0.3%
1980	356		8.9%
1990	360		1.1%
2000	376		4.4%
2010	345		−8.2%
2020	286		−17.1%
U.S. Decennial Census

=== 2010 census ===
As of the census of 2010, there were 345 people, 156 households, and 88 families residing in the town. The population density was 348.5 inhabitants per square mile (134.6/km^{2}). There were 317 housing units at an average density of 320.2 per square mile (123.6/km^{2}). The racial makeup of the town was 92.5% White, 2.9% African American, 0.9% Native American, 0.6% Asian, 1.7% from other races, and 1.4% from two or more races. Hispanic or Latino of any race were 2.9% of the population.

There were 156 households, of which 23.7% had children under the age of 18 living with them, 41.0% were married couples living together, 8.3% had a female householder with no husband present, 7.1% had a male householder with no wife present, and 43.6% were non-families. 36.5% of all households were made up of individuals, and 10.2% had someone living alone who was 65 years of age or older. The average household size was 2.21 and the average family size was 2.94.

The median age in the town was 46.9 years. 18.6% of residents were under the age of 18; 8.4% were between the ages of 18 and 24; 20.3% were from 25 to 44; 36.7% were from 45 to 64; and 15.9% were 65 years of age or older. The gender makeup of the town was 49.3% male and 50.7% female.

=== 2000 census ===
As of the census of 2000, there were 376 people, 164 households, and 102 families residing in the town. The population density was 423.9 inhabitants per square mile (163.7/km^{2}). There were 277 housing units at an average density of 312.3 per square mile (120.6/km^{2}). The racial makeup of the town was 92.29% White, 2.13% African American, 4.52% from other races, and 1.06% from two or more races. Hispanic or Latino of any race were 8.24% of the population.

There were 164 households, out of which 29.3% had children under the age of 18 living with them, 47.0% were married couples living together, 11.6% had a female householder with no husband present, and 37.8% were non-families. 34.1% of all households were made up of individuals, and 11.6% had someone living alone who was 65 years of age or older. The average household size was 2.29 and the average family size was 2.94.

In the town, the population was spread out, with 26.1% under the age of 18, 8.8% from 18 to 24, 25.8% from 25 to 44, 25.8% from 45 to 64, and 13.6% who were 65 years of age or older. The median age was 39 years. For every 100 females, there were 88.9 males. For every 100 females age 18 and over, there were 86.6 males.

The median income for a household in the town was $36,477, and the median income for a family was $38,750. Males had a median income of $31,250 versus $27,188 for females. The per capita income for the town was $24,848. About 6.1% of families and 6.8% of the population were below the poverty line, including 9.5% of those under age 18 and 9.5% of those age 65 or over.

== Education ==
It is in the Kent County Public Schools. Kent County Middle School is in Chestertown, and Kent County High School is in an unincorporated area, in the Butlertown census-designated place with a Worton postal address.

The community was formerly assigned to Worton Elementary School. In 2017 the school board voted to close Worton Elementary.
