= Maryland Route 14 =

State highway in Dorchester County, Maryland, US

Maryland Route 14
- Maryland Route 14 highlighted in red

Route information
- Maintained by MDSHA
- Length: 11.51 mi (18.52 km)
- Existed: 1927–present
- Tourist routes: Harriet Tubman Underground Railroad Byway; Chesapeake Country Scenic Byway

Major junctions
- West end: MD 16 near Secretary
- MD 16 in East New Market; MD 392 in East New Market; MD 331 in Rhodesdale
- East end: MD 313 in Eldorado

Location
- Country: United States
- State: Maryland
- Counties: Dorchester

Highway system
- Maryland highway system; Interstate; US; State; Scenic Byways
← US 13	→ US 15

Maryland Route 14 (MD 14) is a state highway in the U.S. state of Maryland. The state highway runs 11.51 miles (18.52 km) from MD 16 near Secretary east to MD 313 in Eldorado. MD 14 connects those two towns with the towns of East New Market and Brookview in northern Dorchester County. The state highway also shares a concurrency with MD 331 between the communities of Rhodesdale and Shiloh Church. The sections of MD 14 between East New Market and Eldorado were constructed between 1911 and 1914. The highway through Secretary was constructed in the late 1920s. The portion of MD 14 east of Shiloh Church was first marked as part of U.S. Route 213 (US 213) in 1927. In the early 1930s, US 213 was rerouted through Vienna; as a result, MD 14 was extended to its present eastern terminus in Eldorado.

== Route description ==
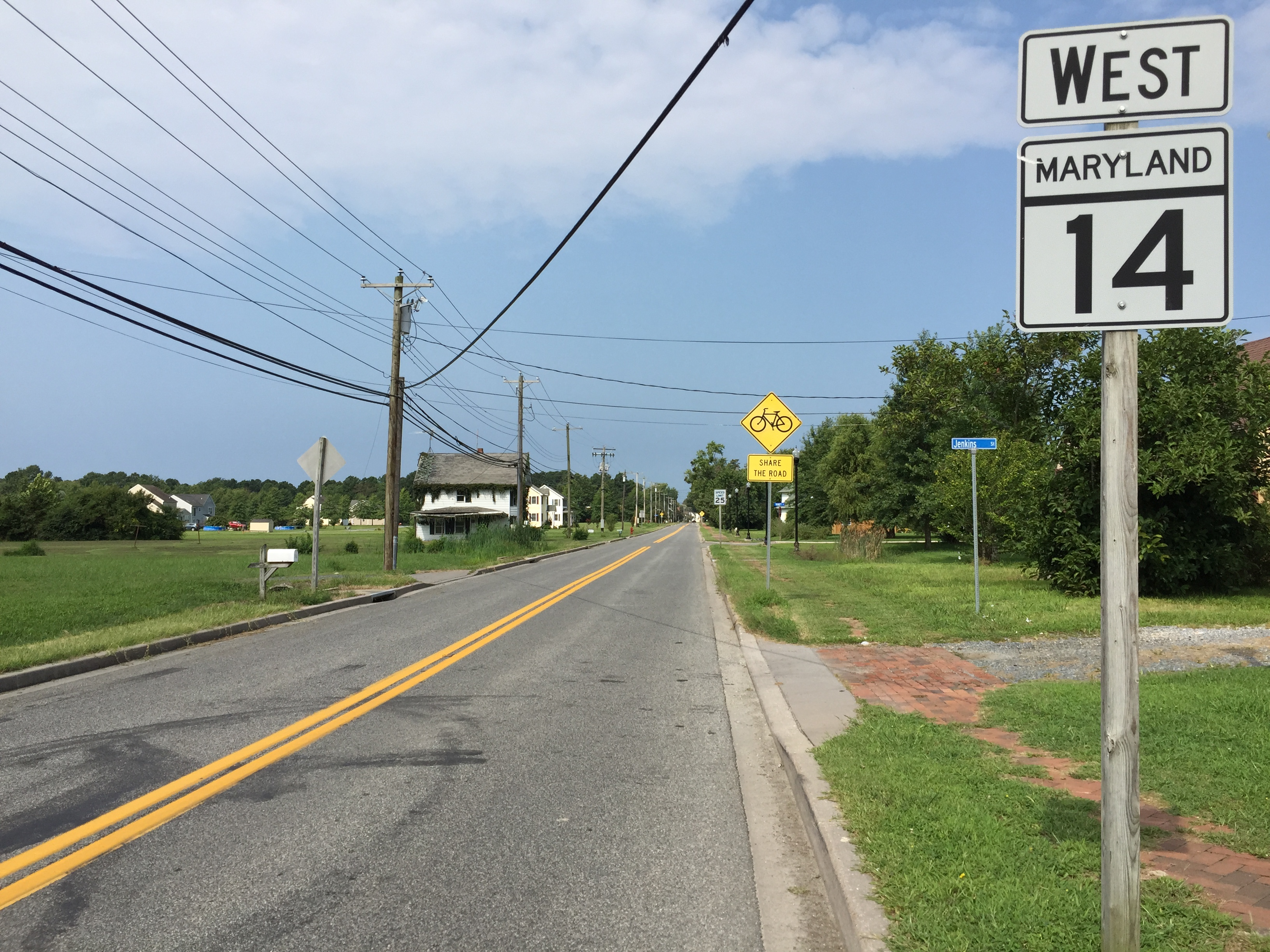
View west along MD 14 in East New Market

MD 14 begins at an intersection with MD 16 (Mt. Holly Road) a short distance west of East New Market. The state highway heads north as two-lane undivided Secretary Road in a straight line before curving to the east and crossing the Warwick River, where the highway's name changes to Main Street and the route enters the town of Secretary. MD 14 intersects Poplar Street, which leads to the suicide bridge over Cabin Creek, before leaving the town. The state highway's name changes to Secretary East New Market Road as the road turns southeast toward the town of East New Market. MD 14 passes through East New Market on Academy Road and Railroad Avenue, with the name change occurring at the center of town at the highway's second intersection with MD 16, known at this point as Main Street. After intersecting MD 392 (East New Market Bypass) and crossing the Seaford Line of the Maryland and Delaware Railroad at-grade, MD 14 leaves the town limits of East New Market.

MD 14 continues east as East New Market Rhodesdale Road. The state highway passes north of North Dorchester High School before the western intersection with MD 331 (Shiloh Church Hurlock Road) in the hamlet of Shiloh Church. MD 14 and MD 331 head east in a concurrency to the community of Rhodesdale, where MD 331 splits to the southeast toward Vienna as Rhodesdale Vienna Road. MD 14 crosses an unused rail right-of-way owned by Delmarva Power and Light Company and continues east as Rhodesdale Eldorado Road. The state highway curves northeast and briefly passes through the town of Brookview before crossing Marshyhope Creek on the Brookview Bridge. Shortly after crossing the creek, MD 14 reaches its eastern terminus at MD 313 in the town of Eldorado. MD 313 continues northeast as Eldorado Road and southeast as Sharptown Road.

== History ==
Maryland Route 342
- Location: Secretary
- Existed: 1930–1939

The first section of MD 14 to be constructed as a modern highway was between East New Market and Shiloh Church in 1911. The next two sections were constructed as part of the major north–south highway of the Eastern Shore; the Shiloh Church–Brookview segment was built in 1912 and the Brookview–Eldorado portion was completed in 1914. When route numbers were first assigned in 1927, MD 14 was placed on the western section and US 213 was marked on the two eastern sections. MD 14 between Secretary and East New Market was constructed in 1926 and 1927. The final section between the western junction with MD 16 and Secretary was paved in 1929 and 1930, and was designated as MD 342. While the modern bridge over Marshyhope Creek at Brookview was completed in 1932, it served a lighter traffic load than the previous bridge because of the opening of a new bridge over the Nanticoke River at Vienna the previous year. By 1933, US 213 was relocated through Vienna and MD 14's eastern terminus was moved from Shiloh Church to Eldorado. MD 14's concurrency with US 213 became a concurrency with MD 331 in 1939 when the two latter highways swapped corridors due to the completion of the new Choptank River Bridge in 1935; at the same time, MD 14 extended west, replacing MD 342.

== Junction list ==
The entire route is in Dorchester County.

Location	mi	km	Destinations	Notes
	0.00	0.00	MD 16 (Mount Holly Road) – East New Market, Cambridge	Western terminus
East New Market	3.24	5.21	MD 16 (Main Street) – Preston	
East New Market	3.72	5.99	MD 392 (East New Market Bypass) – Hurlock, Cambridge	
Shiloh Church	6.37	10.25	MD 331 north (Shiloh Church Hurlock Road) – Hurlock, Preston	West end of concurrency with MD 331
Rhodesdale	8.41	13.53	MD 331 south (Rhodesdale Vienna Road) to US 50 – Vienna	East end of concurrency with MD 331
Eldorado	11.51	18.52	MD 313 (Sharptown Road/Eldorado Road) – Federalsburg, Sharptown	Eastern terminus
1.000 mi = 1.609 km; 1.000 km = 0.621 mi: Concurrency terminus
