= Maryland Route 331 =

Highway in Maryland

Maryland Route 331

Route information
- Maintained by MDSHA
- Length: 28.74 mi (46.25 km)
- Existed: 1939–present
- Tourist routes: Harriet Tubman Underground Railroad Byway; Chesapeake Country Scenic Byway

Major junctions
- South end: US 50 in Vienna
- MD 14 in Rhodesdale; MD 392 in Hurlock; MD 307 in Hurlock; MD 16 near Hurlock; MD 318 in Linchester; MD 817 in Linchester; MD 16 in Preston; MD 578 in Bethlehem
- North end: US 50 in Easton

Location
- Country: United States
- State: Maryland
- Counties: Dorchester, Caroline, Talbot

Highway system
- Maryland highway system; Interstate; US; State; Scenic Byways
← MD 330	→ MD 332

Maryland Route 331 (MD 331) is a 28.74-mile (46.25 km) state highway on the Eastern Shore of Maryland in the United States. Signed north-south, the route runs from Vienna in Dorchester County northwest to Easton in Talbot County, intersecting U.S. Route 50 (US 50) at both ends. MD 331 is a two-lane undivided road most of its length that passes mostly through agricultural areas. The road also passes through the communities of Hurlock and Preston along the way. It encounters several routes during its journey, including MD 14 near Rhodesdale and MD 16 in the Preston area, both of which the route forms concurrencies with. In addition, the route also intersects with MD 392 and MD 307 in Hurlock and with MD 318 near Preston.

Most of present-day MD 331 was designated as part of US 213 in 1926 when the U.S. Highway System was established. By 1940, US 213 was moved to a new alignment that crossed the Choptank River at Cambridge on a bridge built in 1935 and MD 331 was designated to run from Vienna to Easton. Both ends of MD 331 have been shortened since, with the southernmost portion of MD 331 curtailed following the completion of the US 50 bypass of Vienna by the 1990s and the northern terminus of the route cut back to US 50 in 2004 when the state-maintained portion of Dover Road to Dover Street in Easton was turned over to the city.

== Route description ==
MD 331 is a part of the National Highway System as a principal arterial within the town of Easton.

=== Dorchester County ===
MD 331 begins at an interchange with US 50 (Ocean Gateway) in Vienna, Dorchester County, a short distance west of the Nanticoke River. MD 331 signage continues south of US 50 on county-maintained Rhodesdale Vienna Road to an intersection with Old Ocean Gateway in Vienna. From this interchange, the route heads north on Rhodesdale Vienna Road, a two-lane undivided road. It passes through wooded areas, with a set of power lines and an abandoned railroad right-of-way owned by Delmarva Power and Light Company located along the east side of the road. MD 331 continues into farmland, with some rural residences alongside the road, before it approaches Reids Grove, where MD 819 (Reids Grove Road) loops to the west of MD 331. Past Reids Grove, the route continues through a mix of woodland and farmland, still paralleling the power lines and the abandoned railroad.

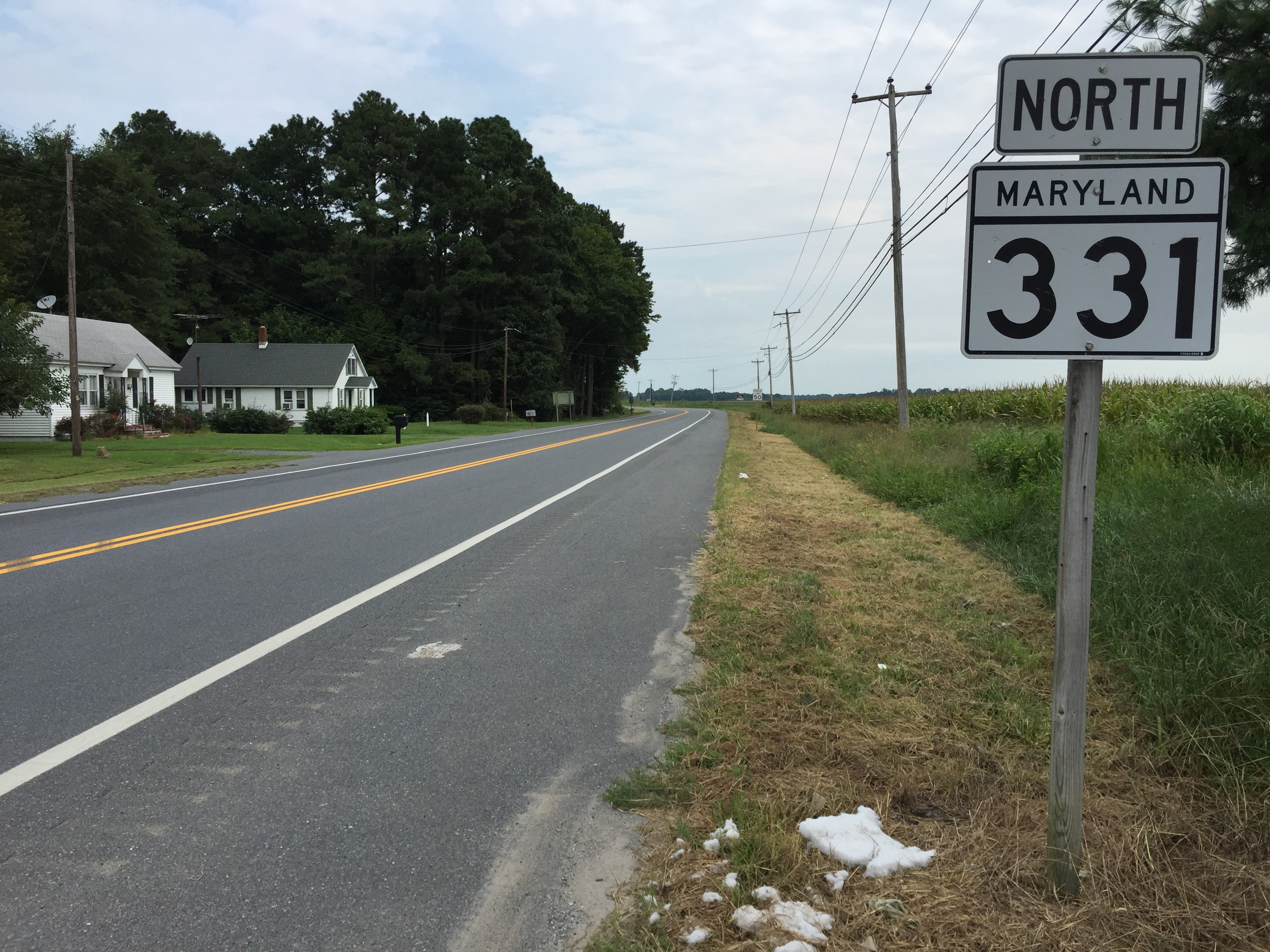
View north along MD 331 at MD 14 near Petersburg

MD 331 reaches Rhodesdale, where it intersects MD 14 (Rhodesdale Eldorado Road). At this intersection, the route makes a left turn to run concurrent with MD 14 along East New Market Rhodesdale Road, heading west through Rhodesdale. The road leaves Rhodesdale and heads into farmland. MD 331 splits from MD 14 in Shiloh Church by turning north on Shiloh Church Hurlock Road at an intersection. Along Shiloh Church Hurlock Road, MD 331 passes a few residences before heading through more farm fields.

MD 331 enters Hurlock and heads into residential areas, with the name changing to Main Street at the Jackson Street intersection. It passes more residences before intersecting MD 392 (Delaware Avenue). Past MD 392, the road passes more homes before it heads into the downtown area of Hurlock, where it crosses the Maryland and Delaware Railroad's Seaford Line at-grade and MD 307 (Broad Street). Past this intersection, MD 331 heads northwest on Academy Street past numerous homes before the road leaves Hurlock. Upon leaving Hurlock, the road becomes Waddells Corner Road and it heads into farmland. The road turns to the west and continues through agricultural areas with intermittent residences. It comes to an intersection with MD 16 (East New Market Ellwood Road), where MD 331 makes a right turn to head north along with MD 16. MD 16/MD 331 head north through a mix of woods and farms with some residences. The road continues through rural areas with an increasing number of residences as it approaches the Preston area. The road intersects the western terminus of MD 318 (Preston Road) near businesses. Past this intersection, MD 16/MD 331 continue northwest on Preston Road.

=== Caroline and Talbot counties ===
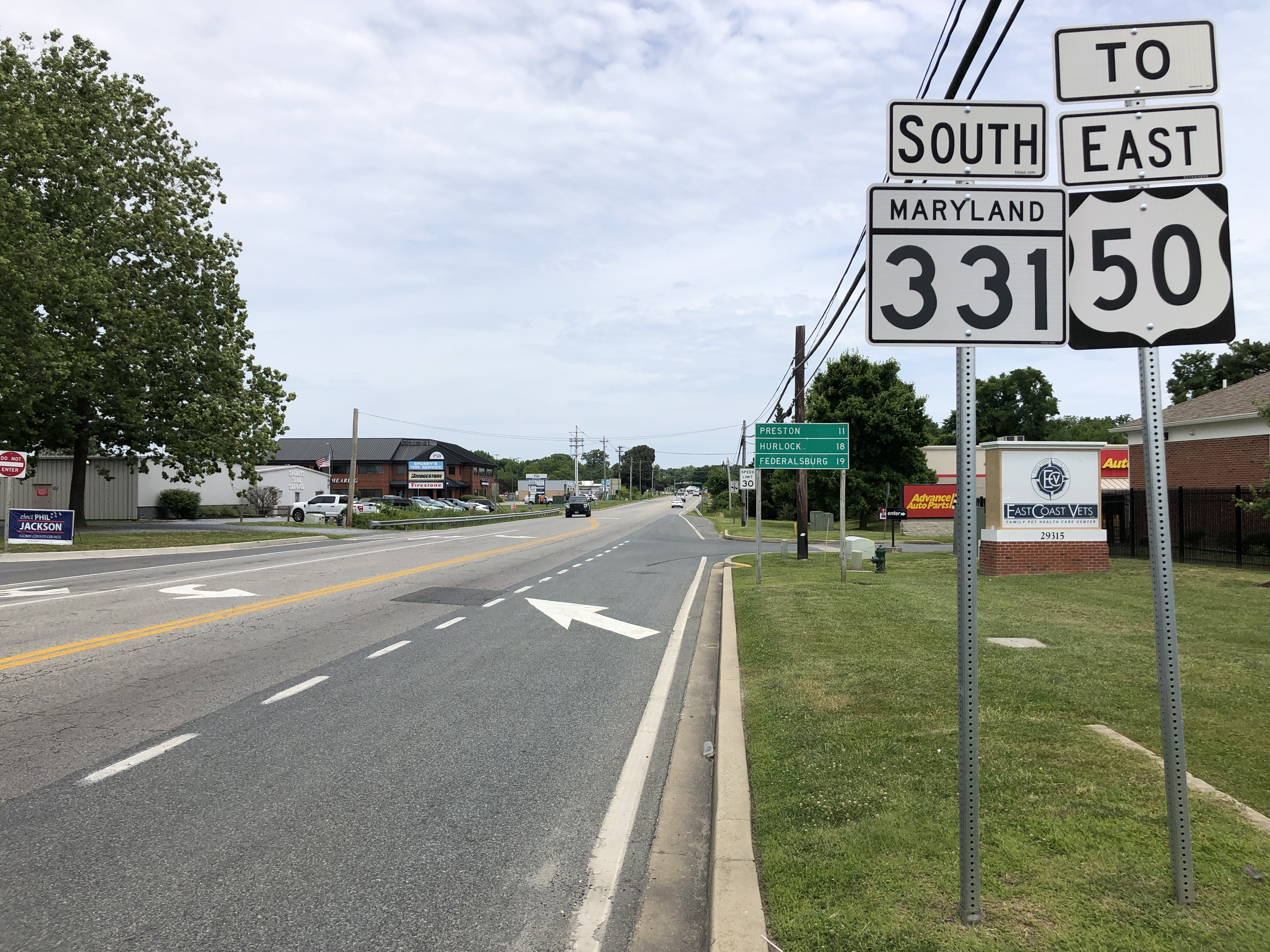
MD 331 southbound past US 50 in Easton

The road crosses the Hunting Creek into Caroline County. In Linchester, MD 817 loops off to the west of MD 16/MD 331 on Linchester Road. Past MD 817, the road enters Preston, where it becomes Main Street, passing by residences and some businesses. The route intersects MD 324 (Maple Avenue) before reaching the center of town, where MD 16 splits from MD 331 by heading northeast on Harmony Road. Past this intersection, the route passes more residences before leaving Preston, where it becomes Dover Bridge Road. It heads north into rural areas of woods and farms with some residences along the road. The road turns to the northwest and intersects Tanyard Road. MD 331 turns west and continues to the residential community of Bethlehem, where it intersects MD 578 (Bethlehem Road). Past Bethlehem, the road continues past many rural residences.

MD 331 enters wetlands as it approaches the Choptank River, which it crosses into Talbot County on the Dover Bridge, a high-level bridge. Upon entering Talbot County, the route becomes Dover Road and continues to the northwest through a mix of woodland and farmland. It turns to the west with the number of residences increasing as it approaches Easton. Upon reaching Easton, MD 331 heads into commercial and industrial areas. The route ends at the intersection with US 50 (Ocean Gateway), where Dover Road continues west as a local road toward downtown Easton.

== History ==
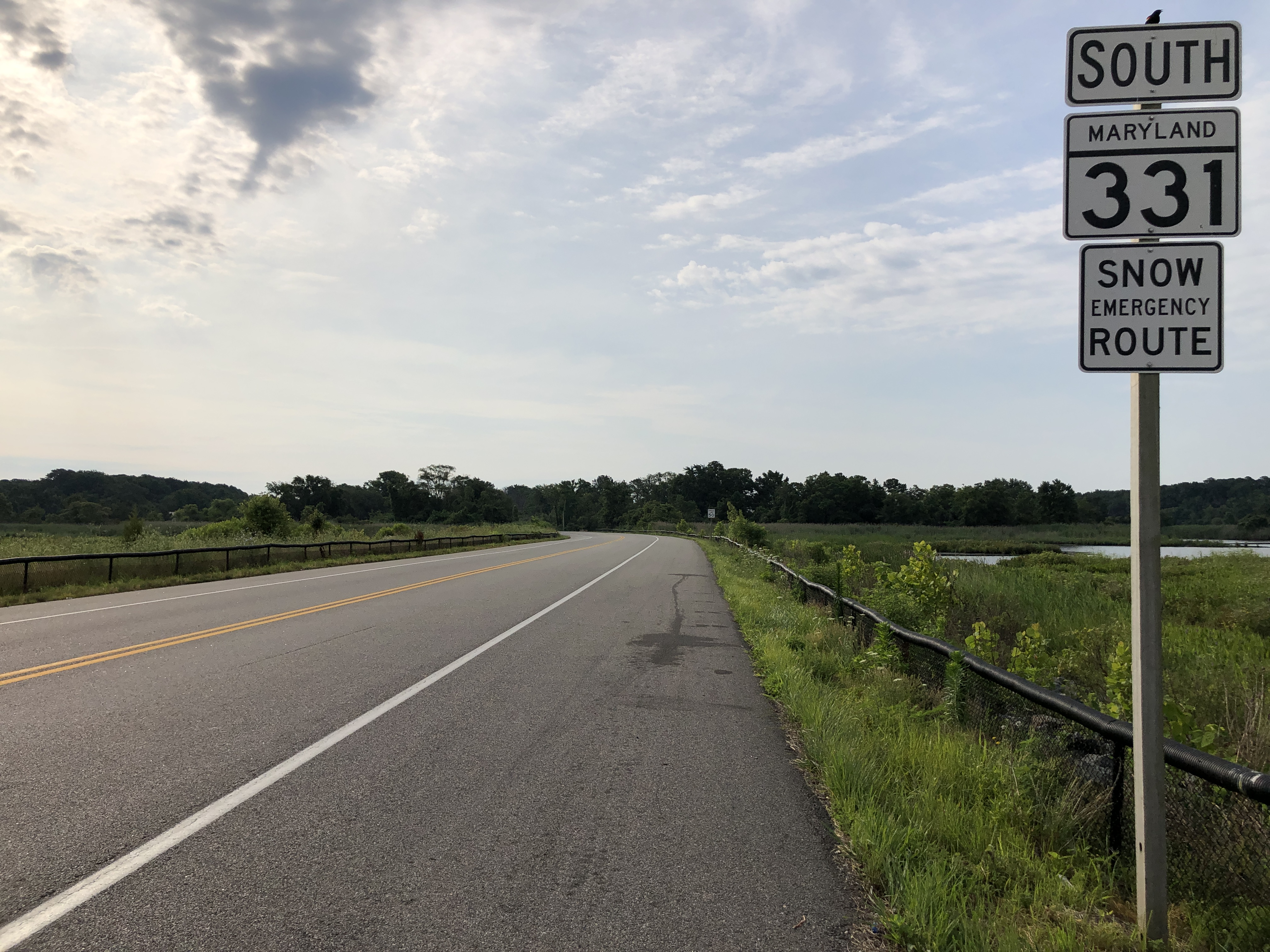
MD 331 southbound past the Dover Bridge in Caroline County

MD 331 from Rhodesdale to Easton was one of the original state roads marked for improvement in 1909. In 1910, the only paved sections of the highway were the approaches to Dover Bridge in both Talbot County and Caroline County. The state road was paved from Hurlock to Shiloh Church in 1912, from Easton to Waddell's Corner in 1913 and 1914, from Waddell's Corner to Hurlock in 1915, and within Hurlock in 1916. When the U.S. Highway System was organized in 1926, the state road became part of US 213.

The first section of the Vienna–Rhodesdale highway was 2 miles (3.2 km) of pavement south from Rhodesdale that was completed by 1923. The remainder of the highway was under construction by 1924, with another 2 miles (3.2 km) section of the road completed north from Vienna by 1927. The gap between Vienna and Rhodesdale was filled in 1928. When the Nanticoke River Bridge at Vienna was completed in 1931, US 213 was rerouted between Mardela Springs and Rhodesdale to pass through Vienna. A new Dover Bridge, replacing a bridge built in the 19th century, was completed in 1932. In 1939, the original MD 331 and US 213 swapped routes; US 213 also assumed MD 344 between Vienna and MD 16 at Mount Holly.

MD 331 has seen little change since 1939. MD 331 and MD 16 were realigned around Ellwood and Linchester around 1960. MD 331's southern terminus was truncated at its newly constructed interchange with US 50 in Vienna in 1991 shortly after US 50 bypassed Vienna. MD 331's northern terminus has been rolled back twice in Easton. The state highway was rolled back from Washington Street to Park Street in 1983. MD 331 was truncated at US 50 in 2004. On October 14, 2014, groundbreaking for a new Dover Bridge took place, with Lieutenant Governor Anthony Brown and other state and local politicians in attendance. The new bridge, which was built to the south of the former swing bridge, was constructed as a fixed-span steel girder bridge. Construction on the new Dover Bridge cost $64 million. The new bridge opened to traffic on June 12, 2018. A ribbon-cutting ceremony for the new Dover Bridge was held on June 13, 2018, with Governor Larry Hogan and other state and local officials in attendance.

== Junction list ==
County	Location	mi	km	Destinations	Notes
Dorchester	Vienna	0.00	0.00	US 50 (Ocean Gateway) – Cambridge, Bay Bridge, Salisbury, Ocean City	Interchange; southern terminus of MD 331
Dorchester	Reids Grove	2.73	4.39	MD 819 north (Reids Grove Road)	Southern terminus of MD 819
Dorchester	Reids Grove	2.90	4.67	MD 819 south (Reids Grove Road)	Northern terminus of MD 819
Dorchester	Rhodesdale	5.92	9.53	MD 14 east (Rhodesdale Eldorado Road) to MD 313 north – Brookview	South end of MD 14 overlap
Dorchester	Shiloh Church	7.96	12.81	MD 14 west (East New Market Rhodesdale Road) – North Dorchester School Complex, East New Market	North end of MD 14 overlap
Dorchester	Hurlock	10.91	17.56	MD 392 (Delaware Avenue) to MD 307	
Dorchester	Hurlock	11.37	18.30	MD 307 north (Broad Street)	Southern terminus of MD 307
Dorchester		13.82	22.24	MD 16 west (East New Market Ellwood Road) – East New Market	South end of MD 16 overlap
Dorchester	Linchester	17.14	27.58	MD 318 east (Preston Road) – Federalsburg	Western terminus of MD 318
Caroline	Linchester	17.36	27.94	MD 817 north (Linchester Road)	Southern terminus of MD 817; officially MD 817A
Caroline	Preston	17.78	28.61	MD 817 south (Linchester Road)	Northern terminus of MD 817; officially MD 817A
Caroline	Preston	18.33	29.50	MD 324 south (Maple Avenue) – Choptank	Northern terminus of MD 324
Caroline	Preston	18.40	29.61	MD 16 east (Harmony Road) – Harmony, Denton	North end of MD 16 overlap
Caroline	Bethlehem	21.81	35.10	MD 578 north (Bethlehem Road) – Harmony	Southern terminus of MD 578
Choptank River		24.78	39.88	Dover Bridge	
Talbot	Easton	28.74	46.25	US 50 (Ocean Gateway)	Northern terminus of MD 331
1.000 mi = 1.609 km; 1.000 km = 0.621 mi: Concurrency terminus

== Auxiliary routes ==
- MD 331A is the designation for the 0.08-mile (0.13 km) section of Linchester Road from MD 16/MD 331 to MD 817A near Preston in Caroline County.
- MD 331B is the designation for the 0.06-mile (0.097 km) section of Seaman Road from MD 16/MD 331 near its intersection with MD 318 in Dorchester County to Langrell Road (MD 817B) on the Dorchester/Caroline County line near Preston.
- MD 331D is the designation for the 0.21-mile (0.34 km) section of Payne Road from MD 16/MD 331 to the terminus of County Route 201 southeast of Preston.
