= Maryland Route 392 =

State highway in Maryland, United States

Maryland Route 392
- Maryland Route 392 highlighted in red

Route information
- Maintained by MDSHA
- Length: 13.54 mi (21.79 km)
- Existed: 1930–present
- Tourist routes: Chesapeake Country Scenic Byway

Major junctions
- West end: MD 16 in East New Market
- MD 14 in East New Market; MD 331 in Hurlock; MD 313 in Finchville; MD 577 at Reliance
- East end: DE 20 at Reliance

Location
- Country: United States
- State: Maryland
- Counties: Dorchester

Highway system
- Maryland highway system; Interstate; US; State; Scenic Byways
← MD 390	→ MD 393

Maryland Route 392 (MD 392) is a state highway in the U.S. state of Maryland. The state highway runs 13.54 miles (21.79 km) from MD 16 in East New Market east to the Delaware state line at Reliance, where the highway continues east as Delaware Route 20 (DE 20). MD 392 connects East New Market with Hurlock as well as Seaford, Delaware, via DE 20. The state highway was constructed from Finchville to Reliance in the early 1930s. MD 392 was extended west to Hurlock in 1951 and to East New Market in 1957.

== Route description ==
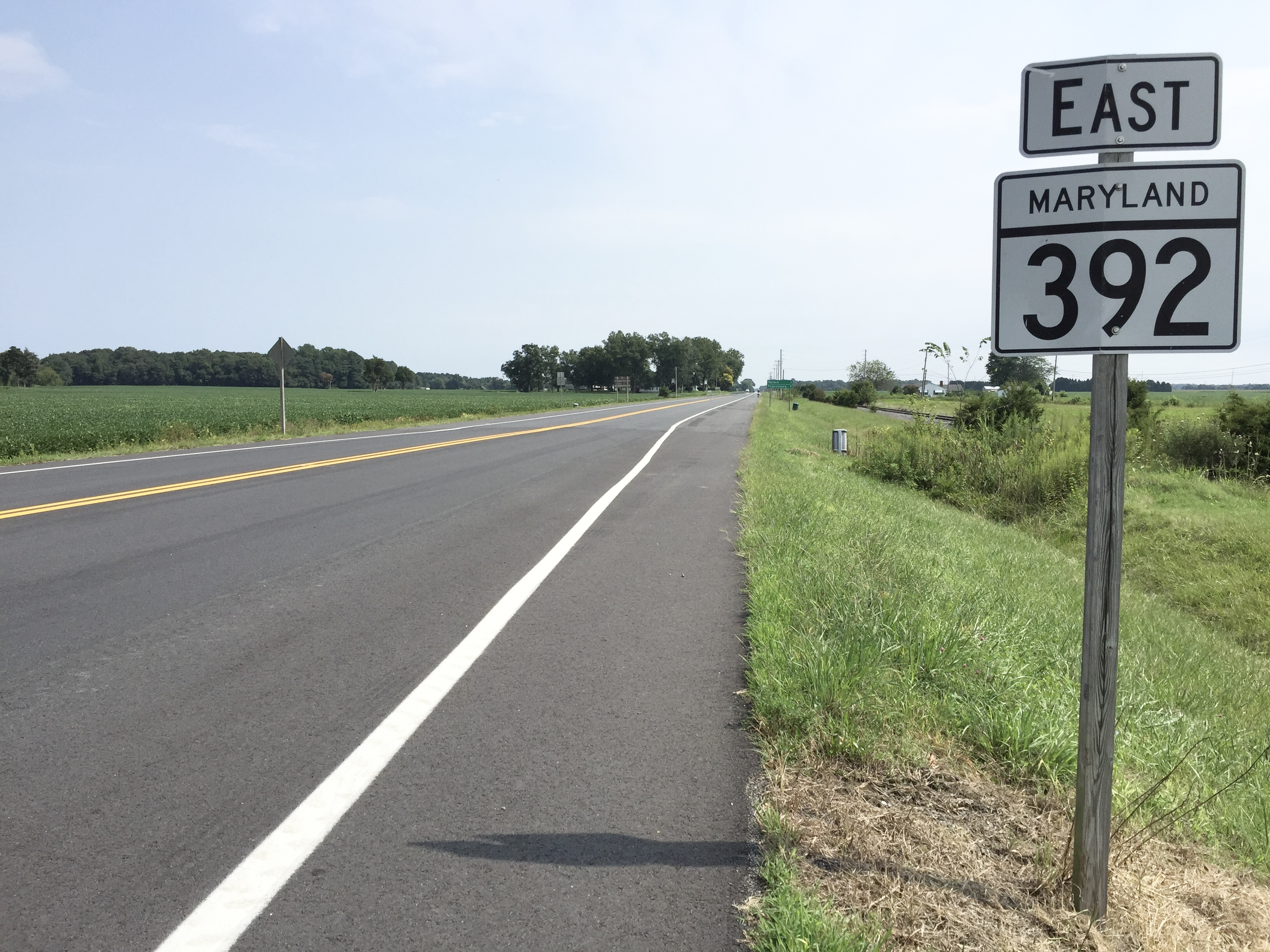
View east along MD 392 in East New Market

MD 392 begins at an intersection with MD 16 (Mount Holly Road) just outside the town of East New Market. The state highway heads east as the East New Market Bypass, a two-lane undivided road. After passing Linkwood Road, MD 392 curves to the northeast and parallels the Seaford Line of the Maryland and Delaware Railroad as the highway passes through the outer edge of East New Market. The state highway leaves the town limits after intersecting MD 14 (Railroad Avenue). MD 392 passes through farmland and the hamlet of Hubbard on its way to Hurlock. Just southwest of the town, Poplar Street (unsigned MD 392A) exits to head toward the center of Hurlock while MD 392 curves to the east, crossing the railroad track at-grade. The state highway becomes Delaware Avenue while passing through the southern part of Hurlock. MD 392 passes south of Hurlock Park and Hurlock Elementary School before intersecting MD 331 (Main Street).

MD 392 crosses Wrights Branch at the east town limit of Hurlock and the highway's name changes to Harrison Ferry Road. After passing through a forested area, the state highway crosses Palmer Mill Road in the hamlet of Harrison Ferry before traversing Marshyhope Creek on the Harrison Ferry Bridge. MD 392 passes through the Chesapeake Forest Lands before the farmland returns before the intersection with MD 313 (Eldorado Road) in Finchville. The state highway continues east along Finchville Reliance Road to the village of Reliance just west of the Delaware state line. MD 392 intersects MD 577 (Reliance Road) 0.03 miles (0.048 km) west of the state line and meets Galestown Reliance Road on the state line itself. The roadway continues east as DE 20 (Stein Highway) toward Seaford.

== History ==
MD 392 was constructed as a modern highway beginning in 1929 from Finchville. The highway was completed to the Delaware state line by 1933. In 1938, the existing Harrison Ferry Bridge was repaired and the county highway between there and Finchville was widened. The highway between MD 14 in East New Market and Poplar Street in Hurlock was constructed on a new alignment as a county highway in 1939. MD 392 was extended west from Finchville to MD 331 in Hurlock in 1951 following the relocation and reconstruction of the existing county highway between Harrison Ferry and Hurlock. New highway was constructed between MD 331 and Poplar Street south of Hurlock and between MD 14 and MD 16 south of East New Market in 1956 and 1957, respectively. These bypasses and the reconstruction of the East New Market–Hurlock road were part of the extension of MD 392 to East New Market in 1957. The present Harrison Ferry Bridge was constructed in 1999.

== Junction list ==
The entire route is in Dorchester County.

Location	mi	km	Destinations	Notes
East New Market	0.00	0.00	MD 16 (Mount Holly Road) – Cambridge, East New Market, Preston	Western terminus
East New Market	1.08	1.74	MD 14 (Railroad Avenue) – Secretary, Rhodesdale	
Hurlock	4.98	8.01	MD 331 (Main Street) – Preston, Vienna	
Finchville	9.99	16.08	MD 313 (Eldorado Road) – Federalsburg, Eldorado	
Reliance	13.51	21.74	MD 577 north (Reliance Road) – Federalsburg	Southern terminus of MD 577
Reliance	13.54	21.79	DE 20 east (Stein Highway) / Galestown Reliance Road south – Seaford	Delaware state line; eastern terminus
1.000 mi = 1.609 km; 1.000 km = 0.621 mi

== Auxiliary routes ==
MD 392A is the unsigned designation for a 0.08-mile (0.13 km) segment of Poplar Street adjacent to its southern terminus at MD 392 in Hurlock.
