= Jacob and Hannah Leverton House =

Historic house in Maryland, United States

- U.S. National Register of Historic Places
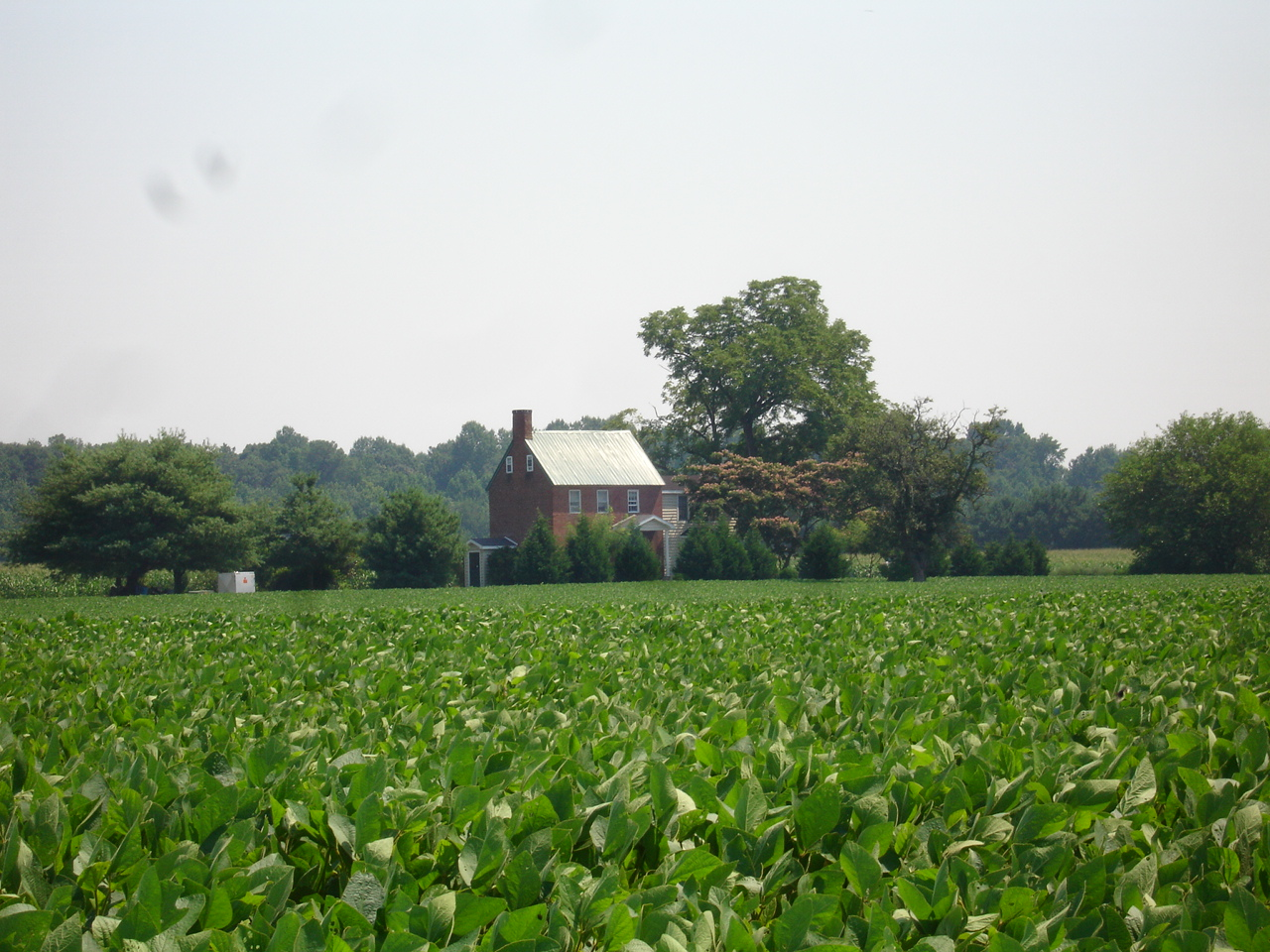

- Location within Maryland Location within the United States
- Nearest city: 3531 Seaman Rd., Preston, Maryland
- Coordinates: 38°42′8.79″N 75°53′28.53″W
- Area: 2.3 acres (0.93 ha)
- Built: 1820
- Architectural style: Federal
- NRHP reference No.: 09000964
- Added to NRHP: December 2, 2009

Jacob and Hannah Leverton House, also known as the Dyott Farm, is a historic home located at Linchester, near Preston, in Caroline County, Maryland, United States. It is a two-story side-passage-plan brick house with a gable roof constructed in the first quarter of the 19th century. A two-bay, two-story frame wing was built in 1968 to replace the original 1 1/2-story wing. It was the home of Jacob and Hannah Leverton, Quakers, who were agents of the Underground Railroad.

It was listed on the National Register of Historic Places in 2009.
