= North Dorchester High School =

Location
- 5875 Cloverdale Road; Hurlock, Maryland; United States; 38°35′13″N 75°52′25″W

Information
- Type: Public
- Established: 1951
- School district: Dorchester County Public Schools
- NCES School ID: 240030000618
- Grades: 9-12
- Student to teacher ratio: 13.39:1
- Colors: Red, White, and Blue
- Mascot: Eagle
- Website: https://www.dcps.k12.md.us/o/northdorchester

North Dorchester High School is an American high school located in Hurlock, Maryland.

In addition to Hurlock, it serves other small Dorchester County, Maryland, communities including Beach Haven, Brookview, East New Market, Eldorado, Elliotts Island, Galestown, Rhodesdale, Secretary and Vienna.

== See also ==
- Education in Maryland
- List of high schools in Maryland
