= William O. Mills =

American politician

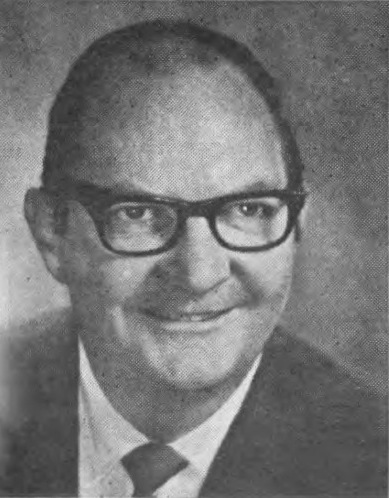

Member of the U.S. House of Representatives from Maryland's 1st district
- In office May 25, 1971 – May 24, 1973
- Preceded by: Rogers Morton
- Succeeded by: Robert Bauman

Personal details
- Born: William Oswald Mills Sr. August 12, 1924 Bethlehem, Maryland, U.S.
- Died: May 24, 1973 (aged 48) Easton, Maryland, U.S.
- Party: Republican (1970–1973)
- Other political affiliations: Democratic (before 1970)
- Spouse: Norma Lee Nichols

William Oswald Mills Sr. (August 12, 1924 – May 24, 1973), was a Republican U.S. congressman who represented the 1st congressional district of Maryland from May 25, 1971, until his death in Easton, Maryland, on May 24, 1973.

== Life and career ==
Mills was born in Bethlehem, Maryland, on August 12, 1924. He attended Caroline County, Maryland, public schools. After graduating from Federalsburg High School in 1941, he then pursued military service. He served in the U.S. Army in 1942, during World War II, as part of general George Patton's Third Army during the crossing of the Rhine River in Germany and was awarded the Bronze Star. After the war, he worked his way up in rank as the manager of the offices of: Easton, Maryland; Preston, Maryland; and Cambridge, Maryland, of the Chesapeake & Potomac Telephone Company from 1946 to 1962. Beginning in 1962, he served on the staff of then-congressman Rogers Morton as a Democrat until finally becoming a Republican in 1970. When Morton was appointed United States Secretary of the Interior by U.S. President Richard Nixon in 1971, Mills won the special election to succeed him in Maryland's 1st District in the 92nd Congress.

== Death ==
On the morning of May 24, 1973, Mills was found dead at a stable near his home in Easton, Maryland, at the age of 48. There was an apparent self-inflicted gunshot wound to the left side of his chest, and a 12-gauge shotgun and spent casing were found by his side.

It was reported that he had been depressed following the death of three of his Congressional aides in a 1972 car accident, and by the fact that his mentor and predecessor, Rogers Morton, was suffering from cancer. However, five days before his death, it was revealed that Mills had received an undisclosed $25,000 gift from the finance committee of President Richard Nixon's re-election campaign during the 1971 special election. Overall, it was part of $900,000 in unaccounted donations made by the committee, according to the General Accounting Office. If Mills were convicted of conducting illegal activity, he could have faced a $1,000 fine and one year in prison.

While Mills initially stated that he had done nothing wrong, he began worrying that the campaign contribution would destroy his political career. In one of his suicide notes, Mills stated that he could not prove his innocence and saw suicide as the only solution. Overall, Mills produced at least seven notes, including one to his son warning him to be honest and another to his constituents.

Despite his concern, Maryland authorities claimed soon after his death that he may not have broken the new state campaign finance law, which did not come into full effect until July 1971, two months after his special election. In fact, there were no indications that state authorities were even going to pursue an investigation.

He is buried at the Hillcrest Cemetery, in Federalsburg, Maryland.

== See also ==
- List of federal political scandals in the United States
- List of members of the United States Congress who died in office (1950–1999)

U.S. House of Representatives
Preceded by Rogers Morton	Member of the U.S. House of Representatives from Maryland's 1st congressional district 1971 – 1973	Succeeded by Robert Bauman
