= Bethlehem, Maryland =

Unincorporated community in Maryland, United States

- Populated place
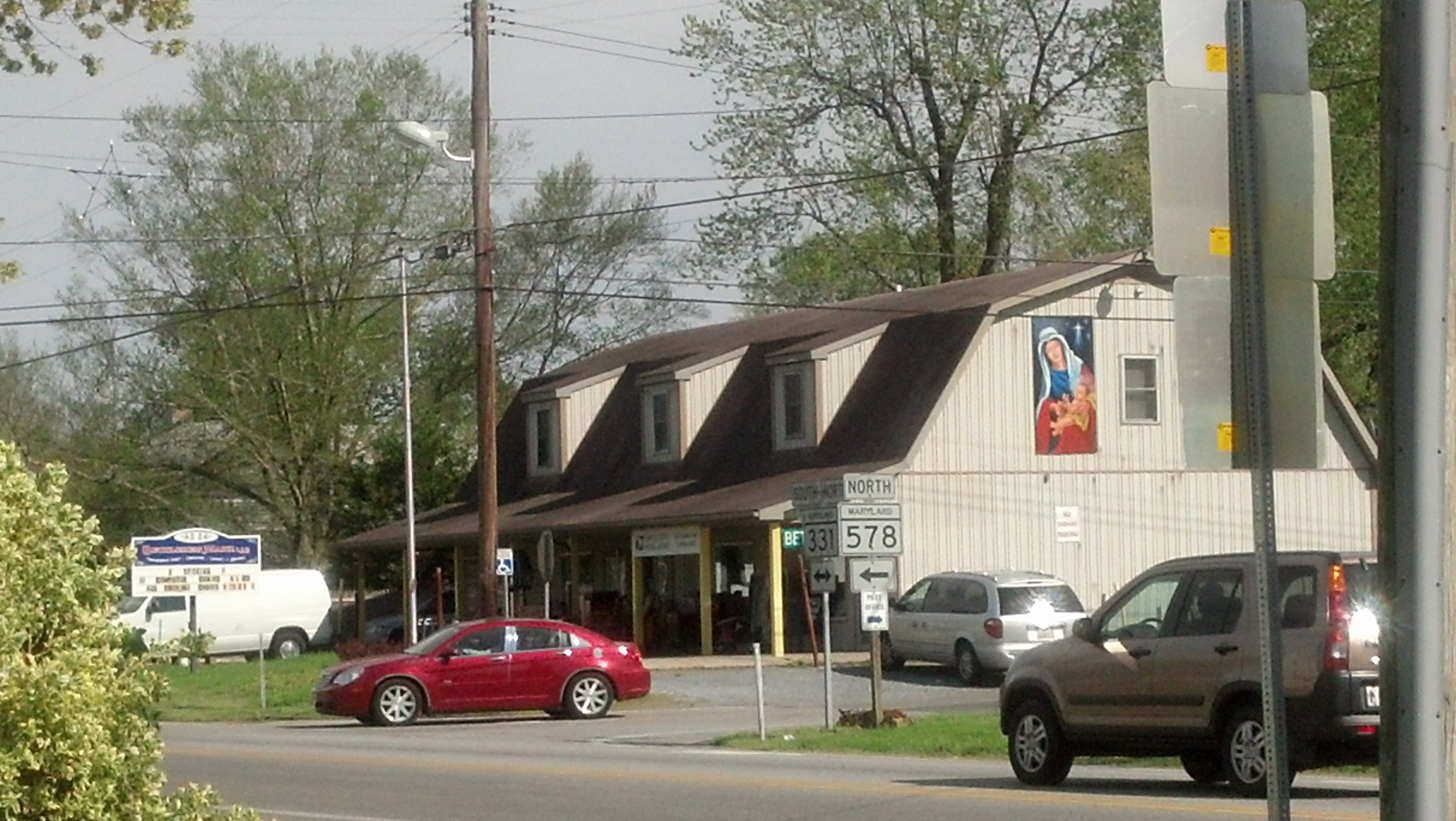
- Bethlehem, Maryland

- Location within Maryland
- Coordinates: 38°44′46″N 75°56′39″W
- Country: United States
- State: Maryland
- County: Caroline
- Elevation: 46 ft (14 m)
- Time zone: UTC−5 (Eastern (EST))
  - Summer (DST): UTC−4 (EDT)
- ZIP code: 21609
- Area codes: 410, 443, and 667
- GNIS feature ID: 583190

Bethlehem is a populated place in Caroline County, Maryland, United States. Bethlehem is located at the intersection of Maryland routes 331 and 578, northwest of Preston.

== History ==
Bethlehem dates far back as 1875, when a U.S Post Office was established as Bethlehem P.O. According to the USGS, the post office was established in 1857. Due to the town sharing its name with the more well known Biblical city that was the birthplace of Jesus, during the run up to Christmas the town's post office regularly gets an increase in business due to people wanting to post Christmas cards to get a postmark with Bethlehem on it. The post office also adds an additional stamp featuring the Three Wise Men following the Star of Bethlehem to the letters. The post office has been traditionally doing this since 1939. The town has had a presence from the Moravian Church in the vicinity in its early days, with the Moravian community preceding the establishment of the community, with evidence of their presence dating back to the American Revolution. In 2010, It was used as a filming location for the movie Sweet Baby Jesus as a modern retelling of the Nativity with Pixie Lott playing a role in the film.

== Politics ==
William Oswald Mills (August 12, 1924 – May 24, 1973), a.k.a. Bill Mills, was a Republican U.S. congressman who represented the 1st Congressional district of Maryland from May 25, 1971, until his death. Mills was born in Bethlehem. Bethlehem's electoral district (Maryland's 1st congressional district) is considered solidly Republican.
