= Maryland Route 578 =

State highway in Maryland, United States

Maryland Route 578
- Bethlehem Road

Route information
- Maintained by MDSHA
- Length: 4.24 mi (6.82 km)
- Existed: 1935–present
- Tourist routes: Harriet Tubman Underground Railroad Byway

Major junctions
- West end: MD 331 at Bethlehem
- East end: MD 16 at Harmony

Location
- Country: United States
- State: Maryland
- Counties: Caroline

Highway system
- Maryland highway system; Interstate; US; State; Scenic Byways
← MD 577	→ MD 579

Maryland Route 578 (MD 578) is a state highway in the U.S. state of Maryland. Known as Bethlehem Road, the state highway runs 4.24 miles (6.82 km) from MD 331 at Bethlehem east to MD 16 at Harmony. The first segment of MD 578 was completed in the mid-1930s; the remainder was built in the early 1940s.

== Route description ==
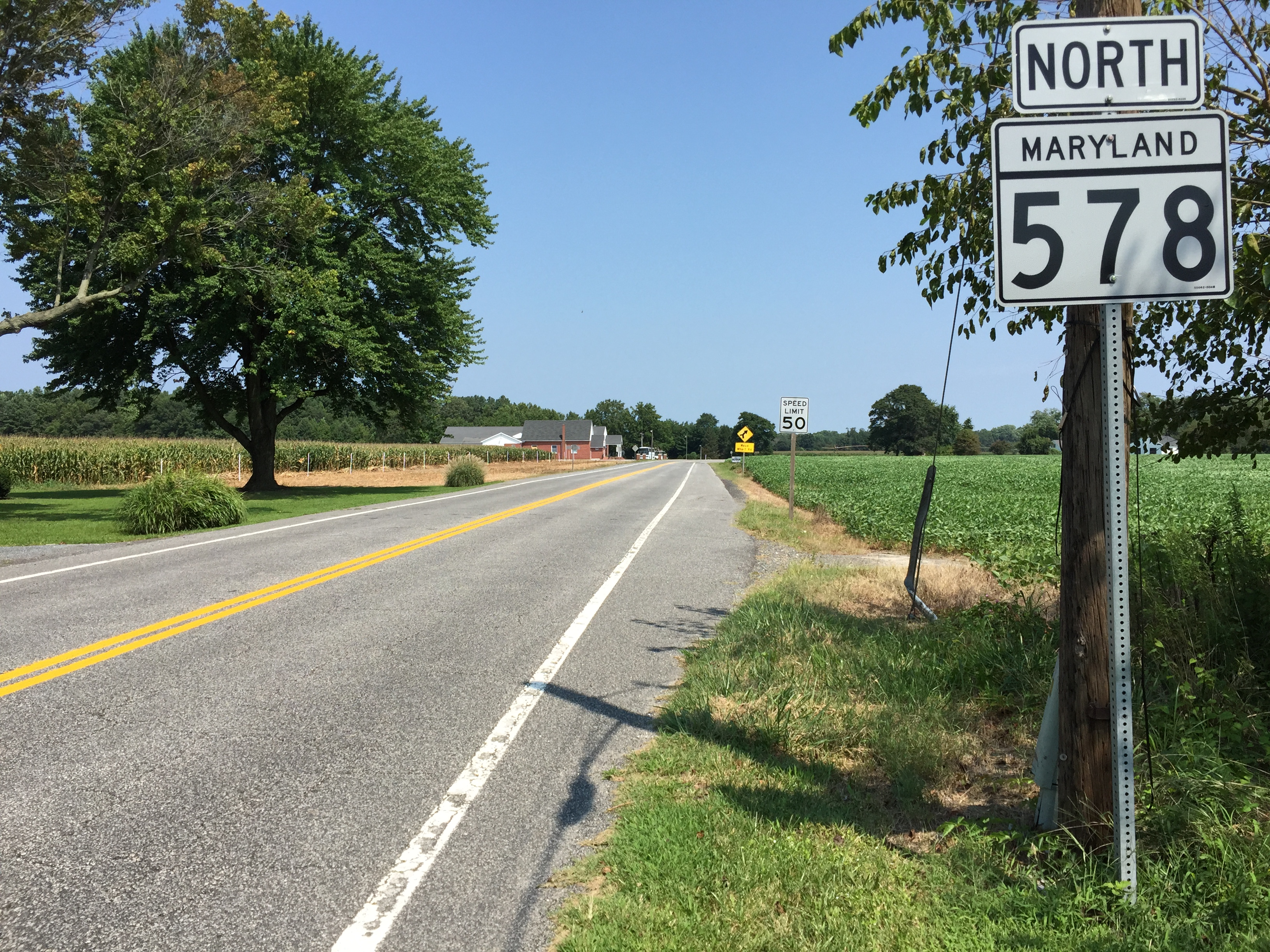
View north along MD 578 at MD 331 in Bethlehem

MD 578 begins at an intersection with MD 331 (Dover Bridge Road) in Bethlehem. Bethlehem Road continues south as a county highway. MD 578 heads northeast as a two-lane undivided road through farmland. After passing Newton Road, the state highway crosses Hog Creek. MD 578 meets its eastern terminus at MD 16 (Harmony Road) in the unincorporated village of Harmony.

== History ==
MD 578 was paved by 1935 from Bethlehem to Newton Road. The remainder of the highway to Harmony, including the bridge over Hog Creek, was completed in 1941.

== Junction list ==
The entire route is in Caroline County.

Location	mi	km	Destinations	Notes
Bethlehem	0.00	0.00	MD 331 (Dover Bridge Road) / Bethlehem Road south – Preston, Easton	Western terminus
Harmony	4.24	6.82	MD 16 (Harmony Road) – Denton, Preston	Eastern terminus
1.000 mi = 1.609 km; 1.000 km = 0.621 mi
