= Suicide bridge =

Type of structure used frequently to commit suicide

A suicide bridge is a bridge that is frequently utilized by people for the purposes of suicide, most typically by jumping off and into the water or ground below. A fall from the height of a tall bridge into water may be fatal, although some people have survived jumps from high bridges such as the Golden Gate Bridge. However, significant injury or death is far from certain; numerous studies report minimally injured persons who died from drowning.

To reach such locations, those with the intention of ending their lives must often walk long distances to reach the point where they finally decide to jump. For example, some individuals have traveled over the 4.46-mile-long (7.18 km) San Francisco–Oakland Bay Bridge by car in order to jump from the Golden Gate Bridge.

== Prevention ==
Suicide prevention advocates believe that suicide by bridge is more likely to be impulsive than other means, and that barriers can have a significant effect on reducing the incidence of suicides by bridge. One study showed that installing barriers on the Duke Ellington Bridge in Washington, D.C.—which has a high incidence of suicide—did not cause an increase in suicides at the nearby Taft Bridge. A similar result was seen when barriers were erected on the popular suicide bridge the Clifton Suspension Bridge, in the United Kingdom. Families affected and groups that help the mentally ill have lobbied governments to erect similar barriers. One such barrier is the Luminous Veil on the Prince Edward Viaduct in Toronto, Canada, once considered North America's second deadliest bridge, with over 400 jumps on record.

Special telephones with connections to crisis hotlines are sometimes installed on bridges.

== Bridges ==
=== Australia ===
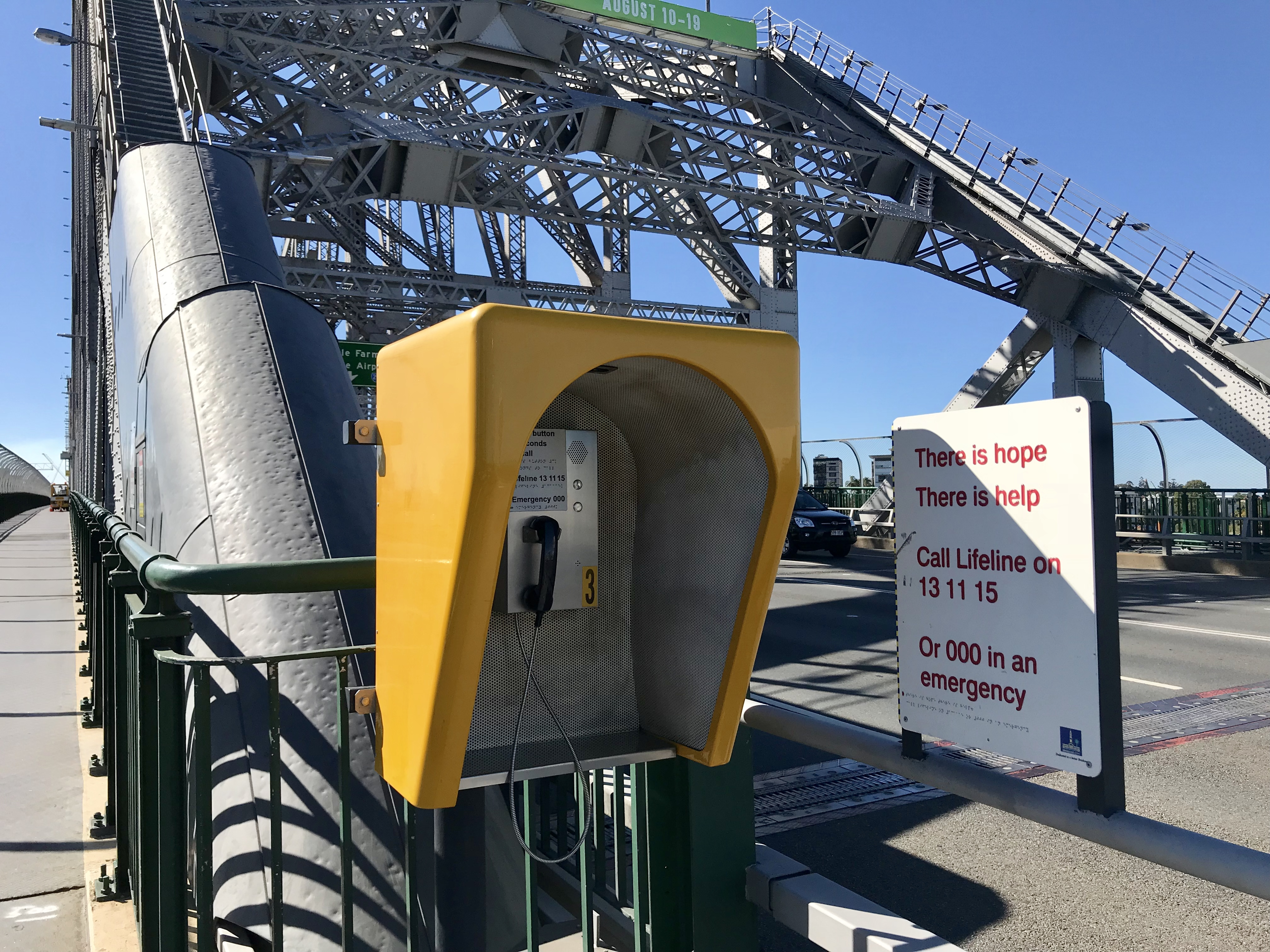
Free telephones linked to suicide prevention hotline installed at the Story Bridge footpath in Brisbane

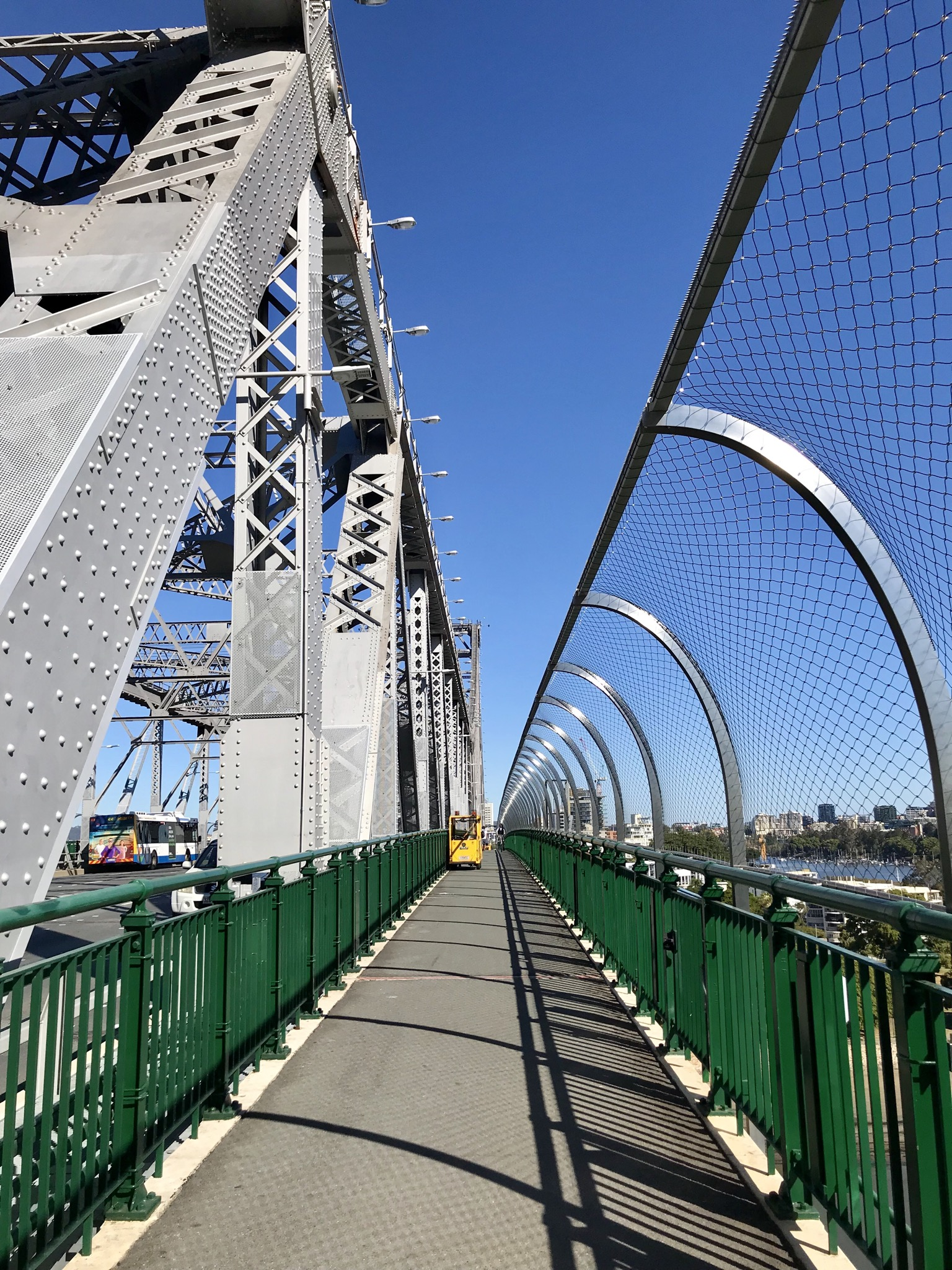
Suicide prevention barrier at the Story Bridge in Brisbane

The Sydney Harbour Bridge, the Mooney Mooney Bridge on the Central Coast (New South Wales), and the Westgate Bridge in Melbourne, Australia and the Story Bridge in Brisbane are considered suicide bridges.

Sydney Harbour Bridge has a suicide prevention barrier.

In February 2009, following the murder of a four-year-old girl who was thrown off the bridge by her father, the first stage of a temporary suicide barrier was erected on Westgate Bridge, constructed of concrete crash barriers topped with a welded mesh fence. The permanent barrier has now been completed throughout the span of the bridge. The barriers are costed at AU$20 million and have been reported to have reduced suicide rates on the Westgate by 85%.

Suicide prevention barriers were installed on the Story Bridge in 2013; a three-metre-high barrier runs the full length of both sides of the bridge.

=== Canada ===
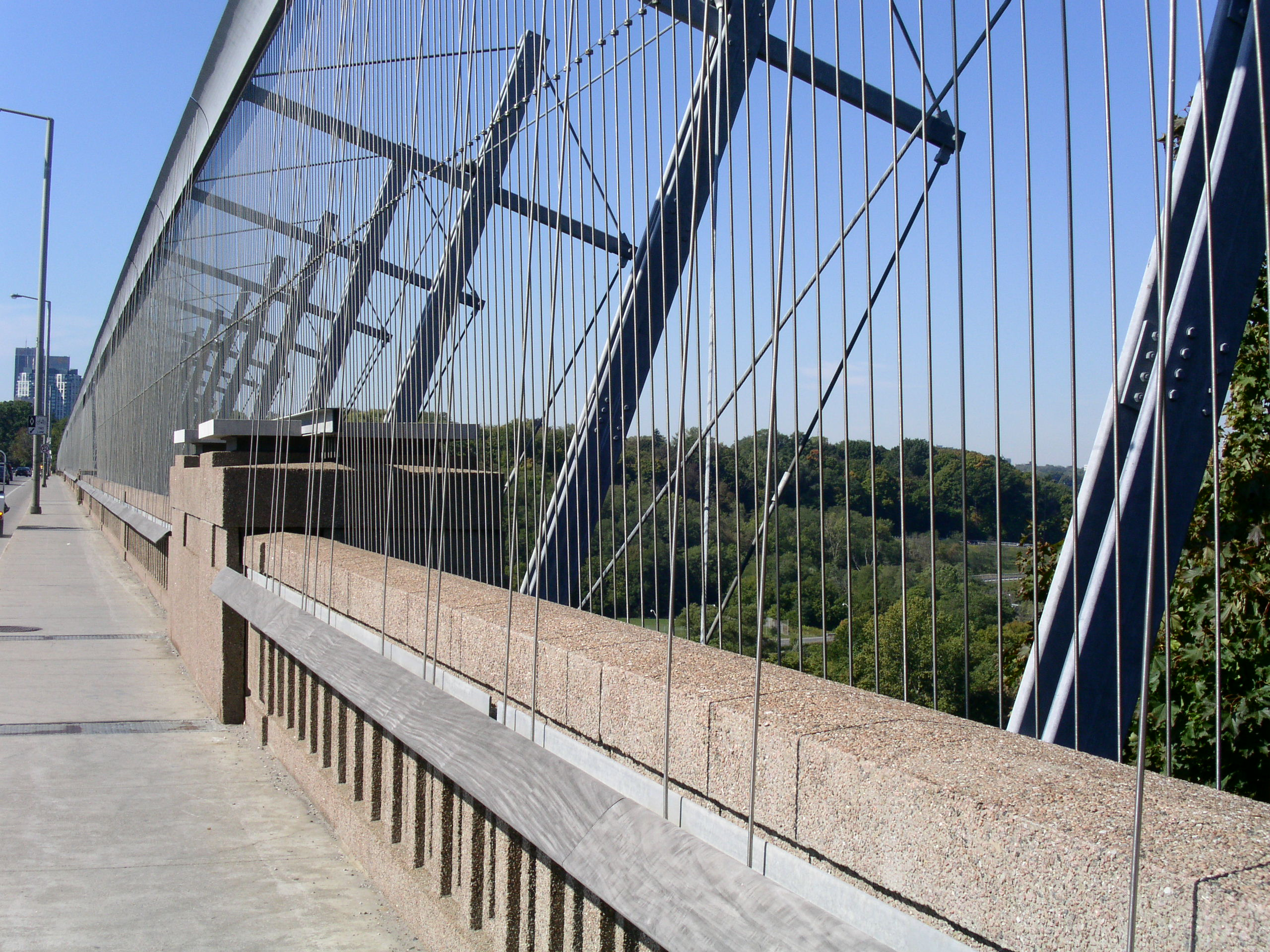
The Luminous Veil suicide barrier installed on Prince Edward Viaduct in Toronto

There are a number of suicide bridges in the Metro Vancouver area, the most frequented being the Lions Gate Bridge, which saw 324 suicidal incidents, including 78 jumps from 2006 to 2017.

The High Level Bridge in Edmonton, Alberta, is considered a suicide bridge. It is unknown how many deaths have occurred at the bridge, but there have been at least 25 in total, with 10 being from 2012 to 2013. Many people have also survived suicide attempts at the bridge. A suicide prevention barrier has been installed along with signage and support phone lines.

The Jacques Cartier Bridge in Montreal, Quebec, is considered a suicide bridge. In 2004, a suicide prevention barrier was installed. Until then the bridge saw an average of 10 suicides a year.

The Prince Edward Viaduct, commonly referred to as the Bloor Viaduct, in Toronto, Ontario, was considered a suicide bridge. With nearly 500 suicides by 2003, the Viaduct was ranked as the second most fatal standing structure in North America, after the Golden Gate Bridge in San Francisco. While suicides from this bridge had dropped to zero after the Luminous Veil was completed in 2003, this did not prevent some from making attempts at other bridges, which includes the Leaside Bridge, situated a few kilometers upstream from this bridge.

The Lethbridge Viaduct in Lethbridge, Alberta, also known as the High Level Bridge, is considered a suicide bridge. It is unknown how many deaths have occurred at the bridge since its opening in 1909. Suicide prevention signage has been installed at the entrance to the bridge, however no further prevention program is in development.

The Angus L. Macdonald Bridge in Halifax, Nova Scotia, has been used for suicide attempts. As of 2010, safety barriers have been installed the full length of the pedestrian walkway.

The Reversing Falls Bridge in Saint John, New Brunswick has had often use for those making suicide attempts. Efforts have been made by the city to install barriers, but they have struggled to secure provincial funds to do so.

The Burgoyne Bridge in St. Catharines, Ontario, has had several suicides. In 2020, stainless steel netting was installed as a suicide prevention measure.

=== Czech Republic ===
About 300 people have jumped to their death from the Nusle Bridge, in Prague, Czech Republic. Barriers almost 3 metres high were erected here in 1997 with the aim to prevent further jumps. In 2007, the fencing was topped off with a 3-foot-wide strip (0.91 m) of polished metal to make it impossible to climb.

The Sítenský most in Kladno has also been described as a suicide bridge and "second Nusle". Between 2013 and 2018, 23 suicides were attempted there. Because it is only 15 metres (49 ft) from the ground, attempts are not always successful, however the bridge is easy to access and there is no suicide barrier.

=== New Zealand ===
The Auckland Harbour Bridge and Grafton Bridge in Auckland have been known for suicides and suicide attempts, with multiple attempts to install suicide prevention barriers in recent decades.

=== South Africa ===
- 88 people have jumped to their death from the Van Stadens Bridge, near Port Elizabeth, Eastern Cape, South Africa. A barrier has since been installed.

=== South Korea ===
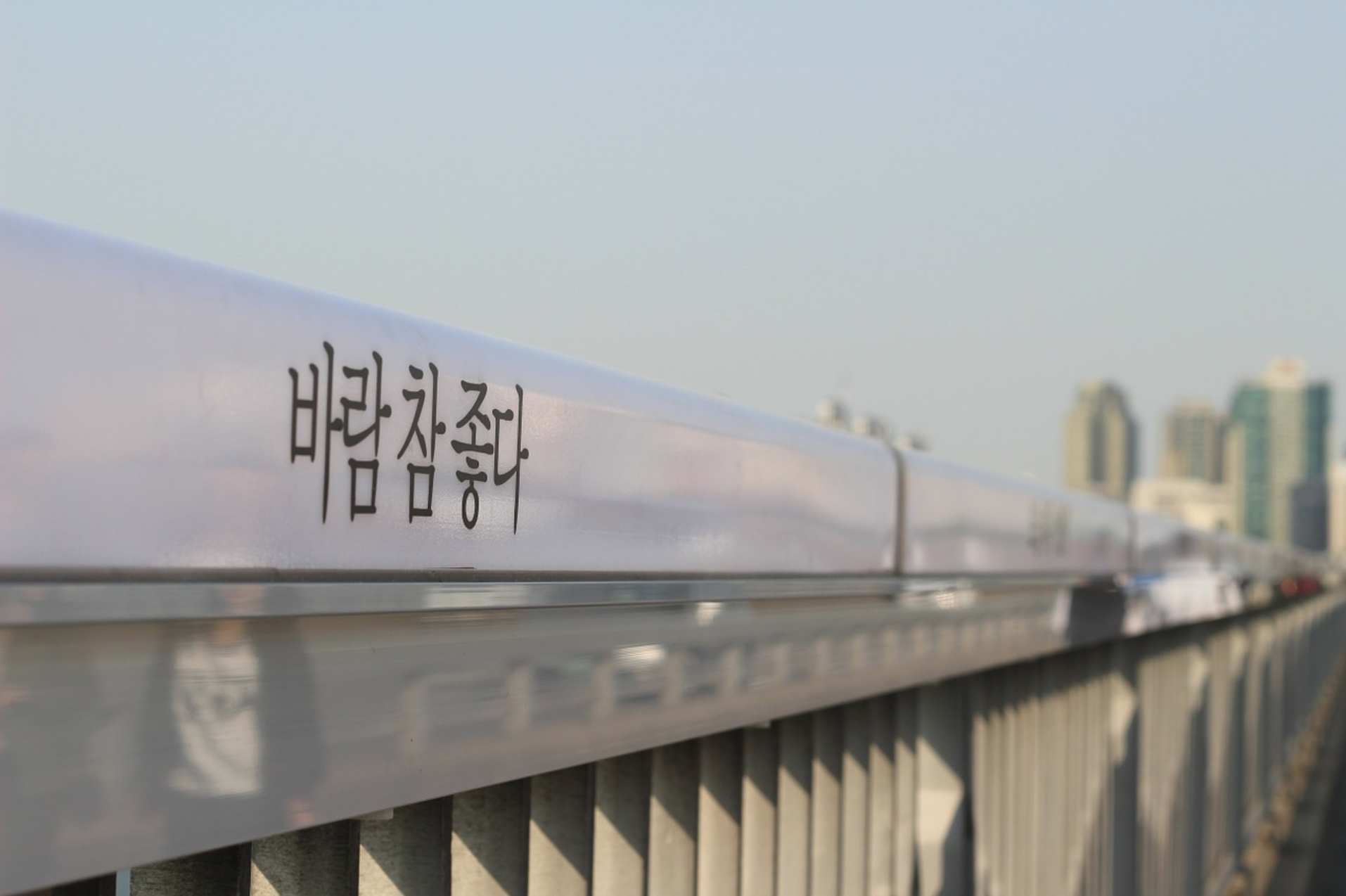
As a suicide prevention initiative, signs on the Mapo Bridge display reassuring messages to potential suicide victims. The phrase on this particular handrail pictured reads: "The wind is really nice."

- A frequently used suicide bridge in Seoul is the Mapo Bridge, locally known as "Suicide Bridge" and "The Bridge of Death". South Korean authorities have tried to counter this by calling the bridge "The Bridge of Life" and posting reassuring messages on the ledges.

=== United Kingdom ===
- The Clifton Suspension Bridge in Bristol was designed by Isambard Kingdom Brunel and opened in 1864. Since then, it has gained a reputation as a suicide bridge, with over 500 deaths from jumping. It has plaques that advertise the telephone number of Samaritans. In 1998, the bridge was fitted with suicide barriers, which halved the suicide rate in the years following. It lays over the River Avon. CCTV is also installed on the bridge.
- Foyle Bridge, Derry, Northern Ireland. Since opening in 1984 there have been over 90 deaths associated with the bridge, most jumping from the 125 foot bridge at night into the River Foyle below.The number of incidents lead to the establishment of the Foyle Search & Rescue in 1993.Several proposals have been put forward to prevent such incidents, however none have been implemented as of yet.
- A notable suicide bridge in London is the Hornsey Lane Bridge, which passes over Archway Road and connects the Highgate and Crouch End areas. The bridge provides views of notable landmarks such as St. Paul's Cathedral, The Gherkin and The Shard. It was the venue for mental illness campaign group Mad Pride's inaugural vigil in 2000 and was the subject of Johnny Burke's 2006 film The Suicide Bridge. When, at the end of 2010, three men in three weeks died by suicide from jumping from the bridge, a campaign was set up by local residents for better anti-suicide measures to be put in place. In October 2015 Islington Council and Haringey Council approved Transport for London's plans for the construction of a safety fence. In summer 2019, Haringey Council installed additional measures to prevent suicide from the bridge in the form of a 3m high fence.
- At the Humber Bridge in Hull, more than 200 incidents of people jumping or falling from the bridge have taken place since its opening in 1981. Between 1990 and February 2001 the Humber Rescue Team was called 64 times to deal with people falling or jumping off the bridge.
- Overtoun Bridge near Dumbarton in West Dunbartonshire has been publicised due to reports of dogs jumping or falling from the bridge.

=== United States ===
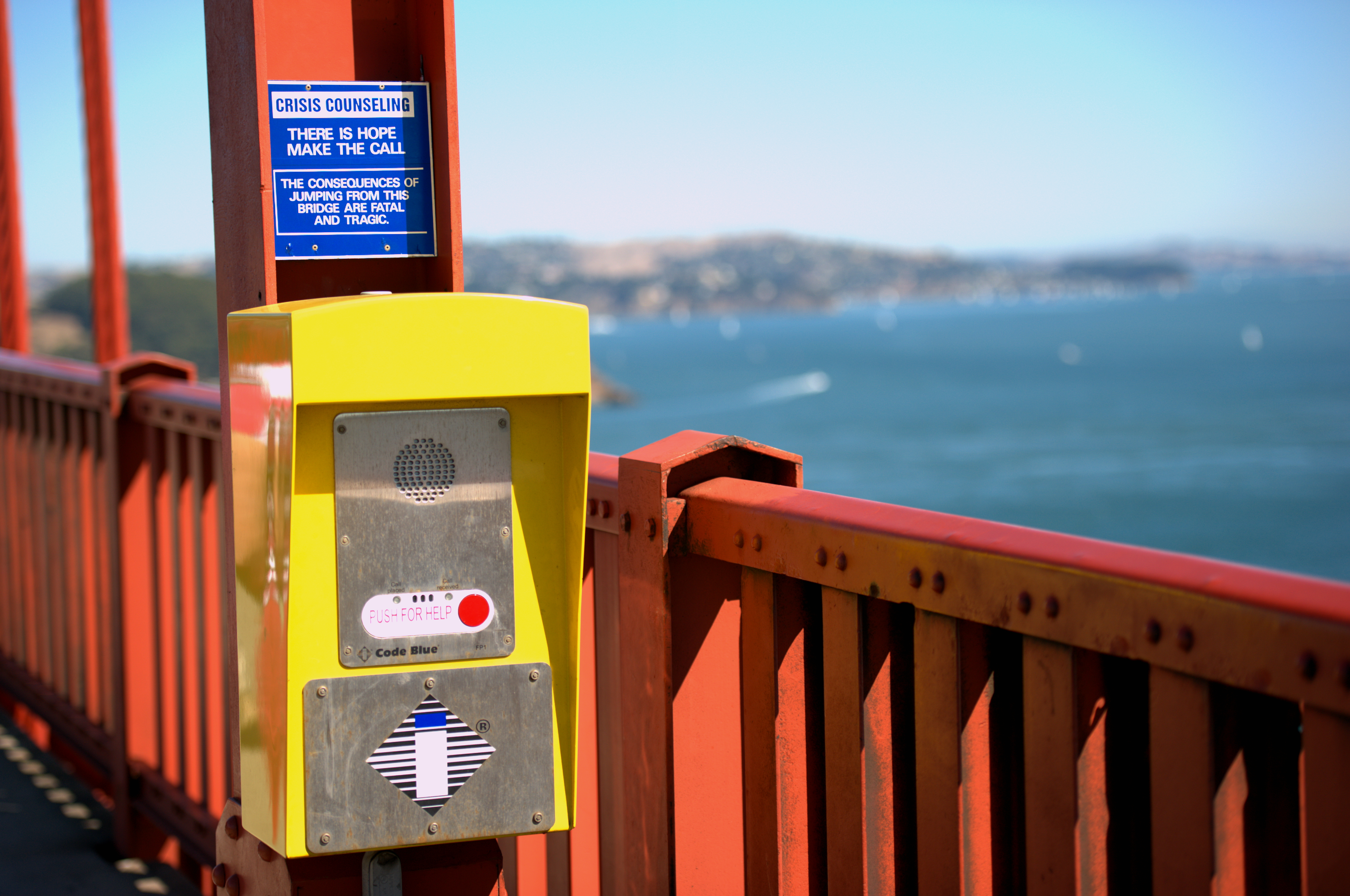
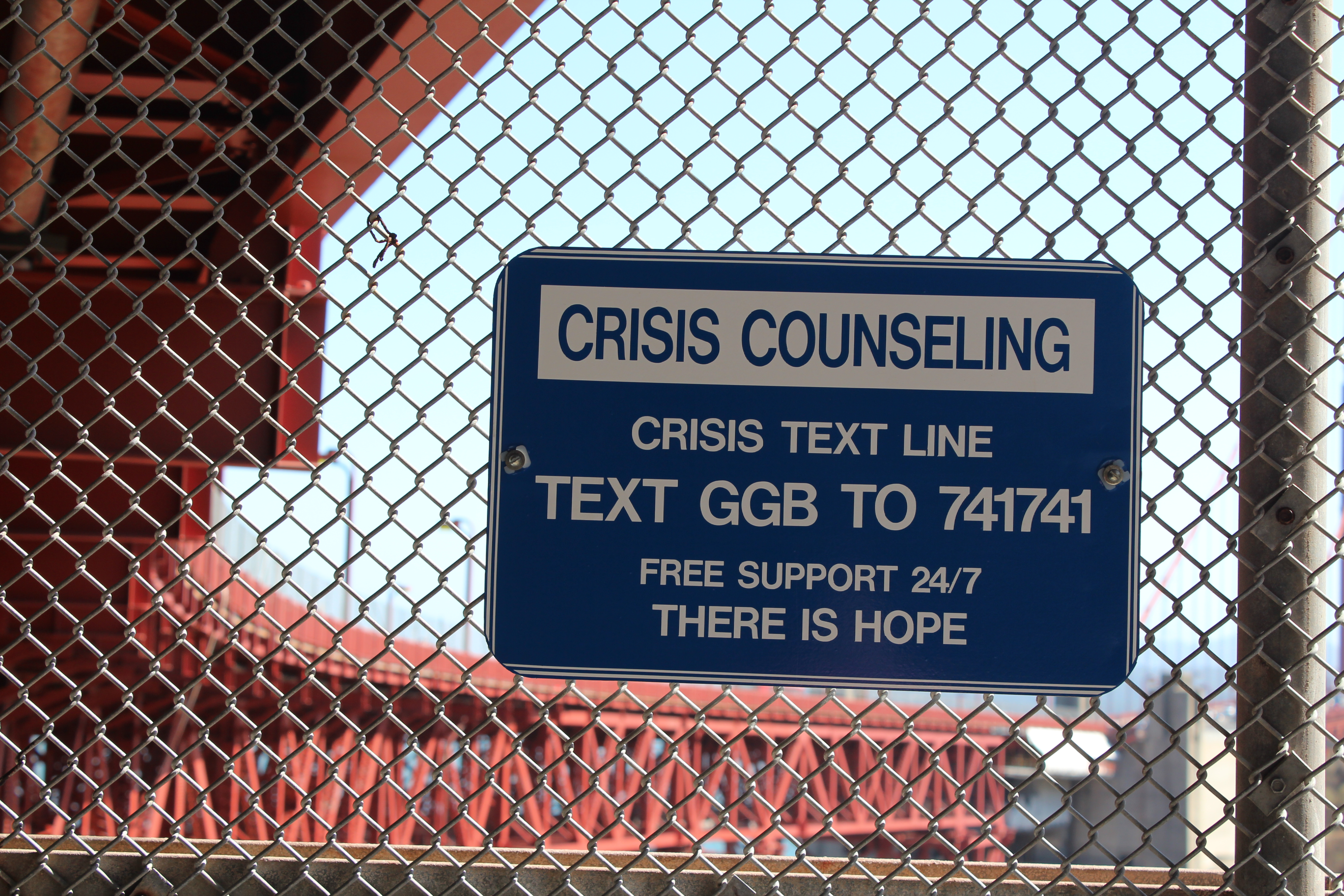
As a suicide prevention initiative, signs on the Golden Gate Bridge promote special telephones that connect to a crisis hotline, as well as a 24/7 crisis text line.

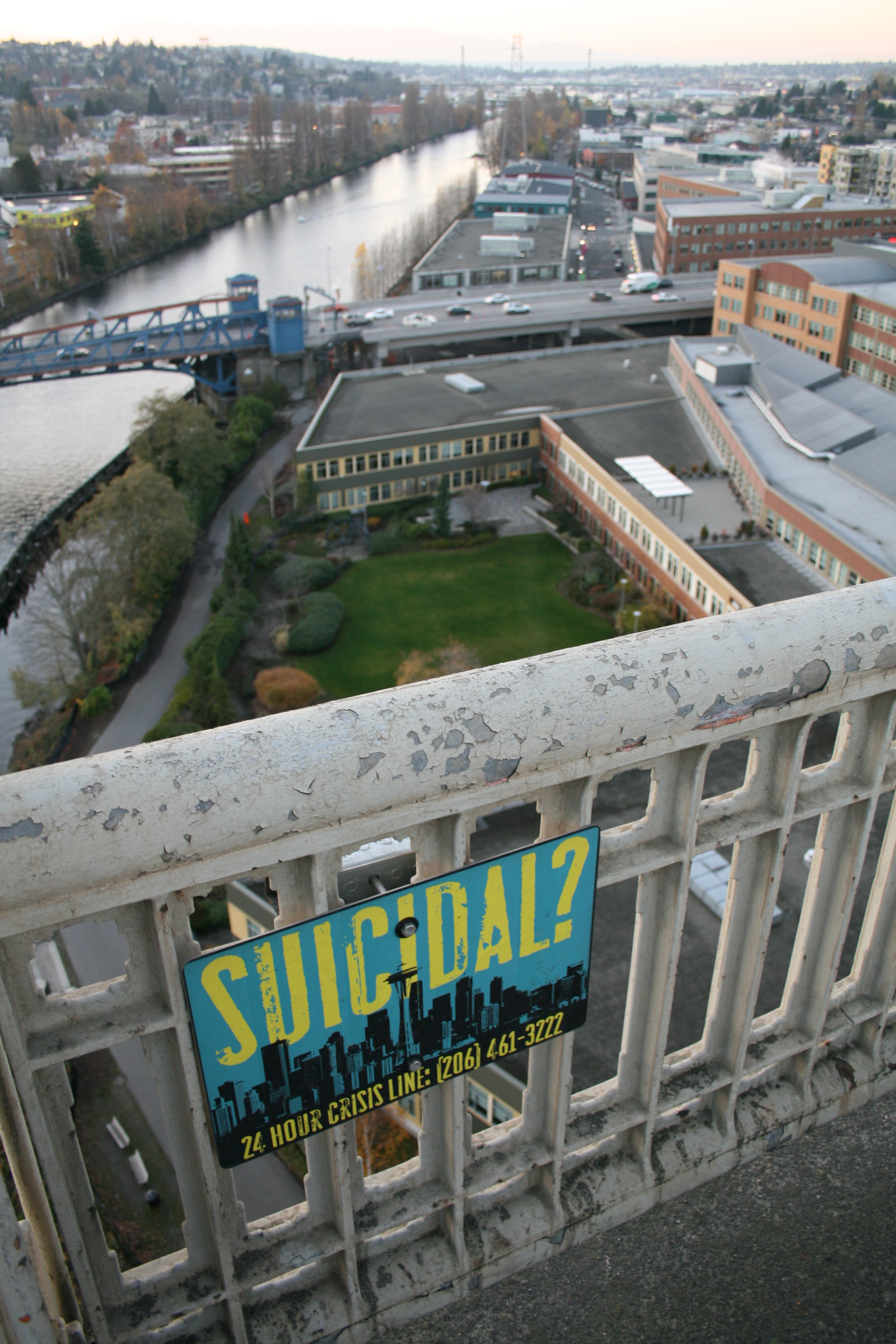
Suicide hotline on the George Washington Memorial Bridge, Seattle, Washington.

- The Golden Gate Bridge in San Francisco has the second highest number of suicides in the world (after the Nanjing Yangtze River Bridge) with around 1,600 bodies having been recovered as of 2012, and the assumption of many more unconfirmed deaths. In 2004, documentary filmmaker Eric Steel set off controversy by revealing that he had tricked the bridge committee into allowing him to film the Golden Gate for months and had captured 23 suicides on film for his documentary The Bridge (2006). In March 2005, San Francisco supervisor Tom Ammiano proposed funding a study on erecting a suicide barrier on the bridge. In June 2014, a suicide barrier was approved for the Golden Gate Bridge. Barrier construction began in 2017 and was completed in early 2024.
- In Seattle, Washington, more than 230 people have died by suicide from the George Washington Memorial Bridge, making it the second deadliest suicide bridge in the United States. In a span of a decade ending in January 2007, nearly 50 people jumped to their deaths, nine in 2006. At a cost of $5,000,000, a suicide barrier was completed on February 16, 2011.
- The San Diego-Coronado Bridge is the third-deadliest suicide bridge in the United States, followed by the Sunshine Skyway Bridge in St. Petersburg, Florida.
- The Cold Spring Canyon Arch Bridge along State Route 154 in Santa Barbara County, California has seen 55 jumps by suicide since opening in 1964, including 7 in 2009. A proposal to install a barrier on this bridge in 2005 led to the completion of a safety barrier/fence in March 2012.
- Colorado Street Bridge in Pasadena, California, has also seen barriers erected.
- During the mid-20th century in Philadelphia, Pennsylvania, the Wissahickon Memorial Bridge had a policeman stationed after it opened because of the numerous suicides taking place.
- Cornell University has had a number of suicides by jumping from the bridges over the gorges on campus from the 1970s to 2010. Between 1991 and 1994, five students died by suicide in the gorges.
- New River Gorge Bridge in Fayetteville, West Virginia.
- Suicide Bridge Road is located just off Maryland Route 14 near the town of Secretary, Maryland.
- The Chesapeake Bay Bridge in Maryland.
- The George Washington Bridge in New York City.
- The Natchez Trace Parkway Bridge in Williamson County, Tennessee
- The All-America Bridge in Akron, Ohio.
- The Washington Avenue Bridge in Minneapolis, Minnesota has seen three to five suicides a year for over five decades, the poet John Berryman in 1972 being one such example. In November 2024, temporary fencing was installed between the pedestrian walking area and the side railings, at the cost of roughly $75,000. In 2026, this was replaced by permanent, upgraded railings.
- The Piscataqua River Bridge between Portsmouth, New Hampshire, and Kittery, Maine.

=== Venezuela ===
Starting from 2023, the Venezuelan Observatory of Violence documented an increase in suicides in the Miranda and Sucre viaducts of Mérida and said that their choice could be due to a copycat effect. Fences were installed in both viaducts to prevent further attempts.

== See also ==
- Copycat suicide
- List of suicide sites
- Lover's Leap
- Aokigahara suicide forest
