= Murder of Patrick Dennehy =

2003 death in Waco, Texas

Patrick Dennehy
- Dennehy at Baylor

Personal information
- Born: January 28, 1982 Santa Clara, California, U.S.
- Died: June 12, 2003 (aged 21) Waco, Texas, U.S.
- Listed height: 6 ft 10 in (2.08 m)
- Listed weight: 230 lb (104 kg)

Career information
- High school: Wilcox (Santa Clara, California); Saint Francis (Mountain View, California)
- College: New Mexico (2000–2002)
- Position: Forward
- Number: 33

Career Mountain West statistics
- Points: 402 (6.4 ppg)
- Rebounds: 363 (5.8 rpg)
- Personal fouls: 190 (3.0 pfpg)

The murder of Patrick Dennehy, an American college basketball player for Baylor University, occurred on June 12, 2003, when he was shot by teammate Carlton Dotson. The murder set off a chain of events which led to a broader scandal in which Baylor's basketball program was investigated and punished for numerous infractions by the National Collegiate Athletic Association (NCAA).

== Background ==
Patrick James Dennehy was born in Santa Clara, California. He transferred to Baylor University from the University of New Mexico (UNM) following his sophomore season in 2001–2002. In the summer of 2003, after redshirting the 2002–2003 season, Dennehy was preparing to play for Baylor Bears men's basketball team in the upcoming 2003–2004 season.

Carlton Dotson, a junior power forward on the team who was a friend of Dennehy's, attended North Dorchester High School in Hurlock, Maryland and Paris Junior College before transferring to Baylor in the summer of 2002, where he played one season.

=== Career statistics ===
Legend
GP	Games played	GS	Games started	MPG	Minutes per game
FG%	Field goal percentage	3P%	3-point field goal percentage	FT%	Free throw percentage
RPG	Rebounds per game	APG	Assists per game	SPG	Steals per game
BPG	Blocks per game	PPG	Points per game	**Bold**	Career high

==== Patrick Dennehy ====
Year	Team	GP	GS	MPG	FG%	3P%	FT%	RPG	APG	SPG	BPG	PPG
2000–01	New Mexico	**33**	1	12.6	.434	.000	.407	4.2	.4	.4	.5	2.5
2001–02	New Mexico	30	**28**	**27.9**	**.508**	**.500**	**.629**	**7.5**	**.7**	**1.0**	**.7**	**10.6**
Career		63	29	19.9	.490	.333	.578	5.8	.6	.7	.6	6.4

==== Carlton Dotson ====
Year	Team	GP	GS	MPG	FG%	3P%	FT%	RPG	APG	SPG	BPG	PPG
2002–03	Baylor	28	1	15.6	.385	.350	.889	2.6	.6	.6	.4	4.4

== Murder ==
In the summer of 2003, reports surfaced that Dennehy and Dotson were concerned about their safety. The pair had purchased two pistols and a rifle and practiced firing them at a farm north of Waco. Dennehy's friend, Daniel Okopnyi, said he spoke on the phone with Dennehy on June 14, and Dennehy said that he was worried about threats made to Dotson by two teammates. Dennehy also indicated that he and Dotson would be at a party the following day, at which neither appeared.

Over the next few days, there were indications that something had gone wrong: Dennehy's mother and stepfather, Valorie and Brian Brabazon, were concerned that they had received no calls on Father's Day, and Dennehy's roommate, Chris Turk, returned from an out-of-town trip to find that Dennehy's dogs had not been fed in days. The last time that Dennehy had been seen was June 12. On June 19, the Brabazons filed a report with the Waco Police Department that Dennehy was missing. On June 25, Dennehy's Chevrolet Tahoe was found in the parking lot of a shopping mall in Virginia Beach, Virginia, with its license plates removed, allegedly by Dotson.

An affidavit filed on June 23, which was unsealed on June 30, seeking a search warrant for Dennehy's computer says that an informant in Delaware told police that Dotson, who by now was at home in Maryland, told a cousin that he had shot and killed Dennehy during an argument while firing guns in the Waco area. On July 21, Dotson was charged with Dennehy's murder and taken into custody in Maryland. The search for Dennehy continued until July 25, when a badly decomposed body was found in a gravel pit near Waco and was taken to Dallas for an autopsy. While Dotson said he felt compelled to speak with the FBI, it is unknown whether his report led police to Dennehy's body. The following day, medical examiners identified the body as Dennehy's.

On July 30, his death was ruled a homicide after a preliminary autopsy report showed that Dennehy died of gunshot wounds to the head. Upon discovery of Dennehy's remains, the head and body were discovered in separate locations. Whereas sensationalized news reports indicated Dennehy was decapitated, investigators believe this occurrence is most likely the result of scavenging desert animals. On August 7, a memorial service was held for Dennehy in San Jose, California.

The story was subsequently made into a Showtime documentary called Disgraced.

== Court case ==
Subsequent to his August 2003 indictment, on October 28, 2004, Dotson was declared incompetent to stand trial by District Judge George Allen and was sent to a state mental hospital to be reevaluated in four months' time. Three psychiatrists, including one appointed by the court, said that Dotson appeared to be suffering from hallucinations and psychosis, but that he could regain competency to stand trial in the future. Among other issues, Dotson believed people were trying to kill him because he was Jesus. It is believed that his ex-wife also noticed he was hearing voices. In February 2005, Dotson was returned to jail after psychologists deemed him competent to stand trial but that he must continue taking his anti-psychotic medication. The psychologist also said that Dotson's accounts of hallucinations and hearing voices were "suspect."

On June 8, 2005, five days before his trial for murder was to begin, Dotson unexpectedly pleaded guilty to killing Patrick Dennehy. In December 2005, Dotson wrote a letter seeking permission to appeal his case; in January 2006, a judge ruled that Dotson had forfeited his right to appeal when he pleaded guilty.

On June 15, 2005, Dotson was sentenced to 35 years in prison. He was denied parole in December 2020, December 2021, February 2022, and February 2023. On March 25, 2024, Dotson was approved for parole "with completion of a program prior to release." In June 2025, ESPN reported that Dotson had been granted release as part of a Super Intensive Supervision Program. The same article outlined how Dennehy's family believed Dotson should serve his entire sentence, but would not oppose any decisions made by the Texas parole authorities; Dennehy's stepfather said he would talk to Dotson if he had the opportunity.

== University reactions ==
The day Dennehy's body was identified, Baylor University president Robert B. Sloan made a speech to the public where he described the discovery as having the community's "worst fears being realized" and that it was a heart-wrenching loss. He along with many other representatives from Baylor attended Dennehy's funeral. Baylor University also held a campus-wide memorial for Dennehy on August 28, 2003, in the Paul W. Powell Chapel. There was a charity event held by Bill Cosby on September 4, 2003, at the Floyd Casey Stadium where he mentioned Dennehy when discussing people that had been lost throughout the year.

== See also ==
- List of basketball players who died during their careers
