= Handsell =

Historic house in Maryland, US

- U.S. National Register of Historic Places
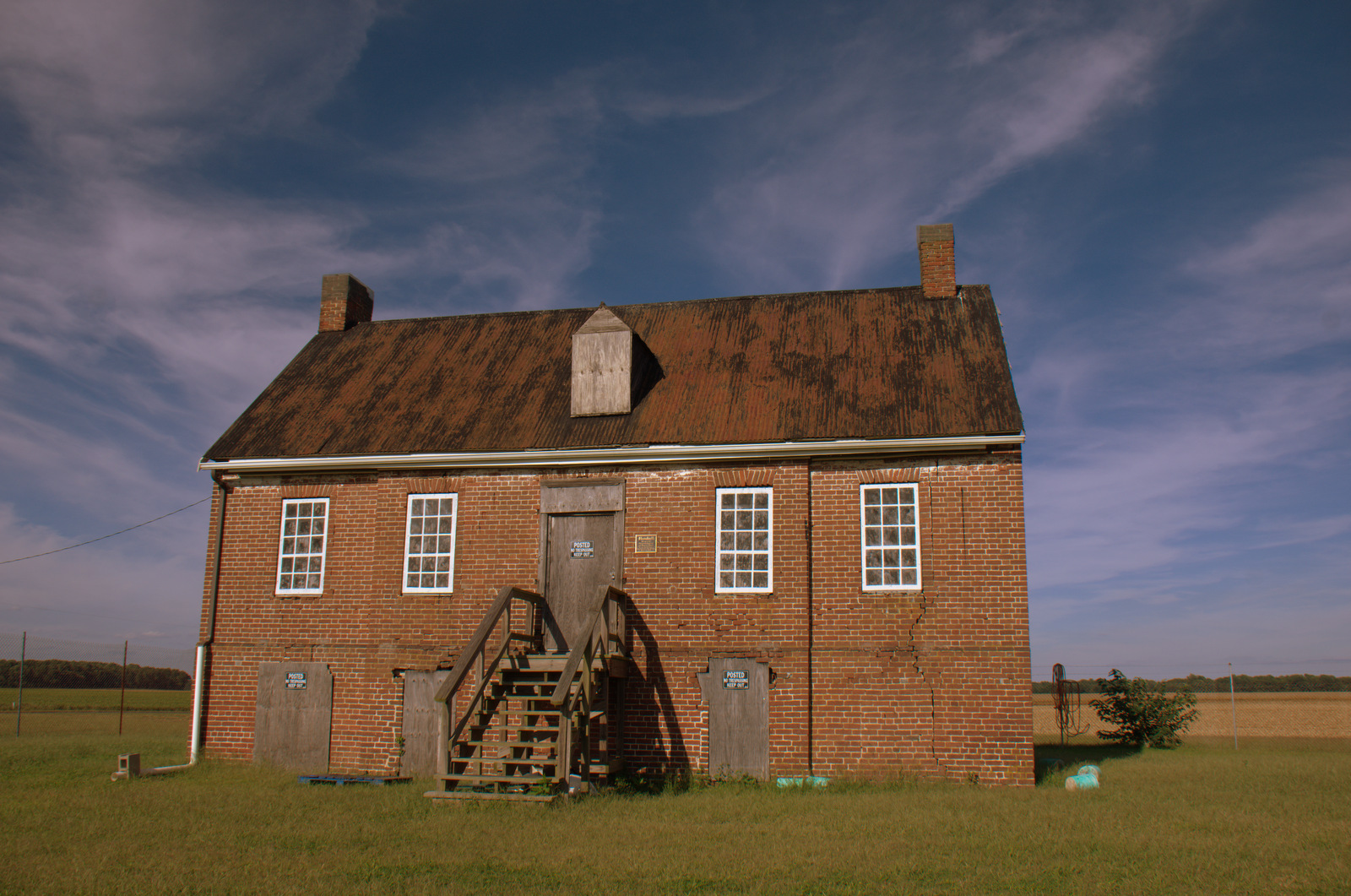

- Location within Maryland Location within the United States
- Location: Indiantown Road, Vienna, Maryland
- Coordinates: 38°30′30″N 75°48′45″W
- Area: 2 acres (0.81 ha)
- Built: 1770
- Architectural style: Georgian
- NRHP reference No.: 08000216
- Added to NRHP: March 26, 2008

Handsell, also known as the Webb House, is a historic home located at Vienna, Dorchester County, Maryland, United States. It is a late-18th-century Georgian-style manor house. It is a 1 1/2-story brick structure over an English basement. The main facade is five bays wide and has a central entrance containing a double door flanked by windows. Handsell bears the name of a 1665 land grant, which has been in the Webb family since 1892.

Handsell was listed on the National Register of Historic Places in 2008.
