= Robert Bauman =

American politician (born 1937)

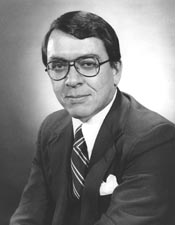

Member of the U.S. House of Representatives from Maryland's 1st district
- In office August 21, 1973 – January 3, 1981
- Preceded by: William Mills
- Succeeded by: Roy Dyson

Member of the Maryland Senate from the 15th district
- In office January 13, 1971 – January 10, 1973
- Preceded by: Robert P. Dean
- Succeeded by: John C. Miller

Personal details
- Born: April 4, 1937 (age 89) Bryn Mawr, Pennsylvania, U.S.
- Party: Republican
- Spouse: Carol Dawson (divorced)
- Children: 4
- Education: Georgetown University (BS, JD)

Robert E. Bauman (born April 4, 1937) is an American lawyer and politician. He is a former member of the U.S. House of Representatives from Maryland's 1st congressional district (1973–1981). Bauman was a prominent conservative advocate in the House before being arrested for soliciting sex from a 16-year-old boy. Following his departure from Congress, Bauman served as legal counsel for The Sovereign Society, and authored a series of financial books.

== Early life and career ==
Robert Edmund Bauman was born in Bryn Mawr, Pennsylvania, to an unwed single mother. When a teenager, Bauman moved to Easton, Maryland, where he attended Easton High School until 1953. In 1955, he graduated from the Capitol Page School at the Library of Congress in Washington, D.C. He obtained a B.S. in international affairs from the School of Foreign Service at Georgetown University in 1959, and a J.D. degree from Georgetown University Law Center in 1964. He was admitted to the Maryland Bar in 1964, was later admitted to the District of Columbia bar, and entered into private practice as a lawyer.

Representative Bauman, known in politics as Bob Bauman, served as a delegate to the Republican National Conventions of 1964, 1972, 1976 and 1980. He was also a member of the Federal Hospital Council of the United States Department of Health, Education, and Welfare from 1970 to 1973. In 1970, he was elected to the Maryland Senate, where he served as a member from 1971 to 1973.

A Roman Catholic, he was married to Carol Dawson, a co-founder of Young Americans for Freedom, with whom he had four children.

== United States Congress ==
Bauman was elected to the United States House of Representatives as a Republican in an August 1973 special election. He replaced William O. Mills, who had died by suicide the previous May.

=== Political positions ===
In Congress, Bauman established a reputation as a staunch conservative, often criticizing the state of morality in the United States. He was a founding member of several conservative activist groups, including the Young Americans for Freedom (YAF) and the American Conservative Union (ACU), and he served both as national chairman. Bauman was also known for his exceptional knowledge of parliamentary procedure and was considered a rising star in the Republican Party in the late 1970s.

=== Scandal ===
On October 3, 1980, while he was running for re-election, Bauman was charged for soliciting sex from a 16-year-old male prostitute.

After the charges were made public, Bauman said he was suffering from alcoholism and entered himself into a court-supervised rehabilitation program, which, upon successful completion, resulted in the charges being dropped. Bauman stated he would continue his re-election campaign, and apologized to voters for his indiscretions.

Bauman was defeated by Democrat Roy Dyson on November 4, 1980. Dyson was not considered a serious contender for the seat before the charges were filed against Bauman. In 1982, Bauman again ran for the nomination for the House seat he had lost, but withdrew from the race before primary election day.

== Post-congressional activities ==
Bauman was co-founder and legal counsel for the Sovereign Society, a group dedicated to promoting offshore banking and investment, that funneled clients to the Panamanian law firm Mossack Fonseca to help them avoid paying taxes to the United States government. "Our [the Sovereign Society] philosophy is not promoted by tax evasion but tax avoidance," Bauman said in an interview. "We serve as a conduit for people who want certain things offshore."

Bauman is the author of numerous books on offshore and tax haven issues. He also wrote an autobiography, The Gentleman from Maryland: The Conscience of a Gay Conservative, which was published in 1986.

== See also ==
- List of LGBT members of the United States Congress
- List of federal political scandals in the United States
- List of federal political sex scandals in the United States

U.S. House of Representatives
Preceded by William Mills	Member of the U.S. House of Representatives from Maryland's 1st congressional district 1973–1981	Succeeded by Roy Dyson
U.S. order of precedence (ceremonial)
Preceded by Joe Kennedy III as Former U.S. Representative	Order of precedence of the United States as Former U.S. Representative	Succeeded by Michael D. Barnes as Former U.S. Representative
