= Rhodesdale, Maryland =

Unincorporated community in Maryland, United States

- Unincorporated community
- Location within Maryland
- Coordinates: 38°34′34″N 75°50′10″W
- Country: United States
- State: Maryland
- County: Dorchester
- Elevation: 39 ft (12 m)
- Time zone: UTC-5 (Eastern (EST))
  - Summer (DST): UTC-4 (EDT)
- ZIP code: 21659
- Area codes: 410, 443, and 667
- GNIS feature ID: 586815

Rhodesdale is an unincorporated community in Dorchester County, Maryland, United States. Rhodesdale is located at the intersection of Maryland routes 14 and 331, north of Vienna and west of Brookview.
