= Harmony, Maryland =

Unincorporated community in Maryland, US

Coordinates: 38.779079°N 75.880251°W

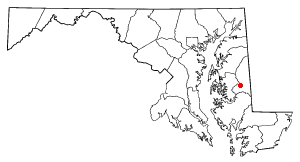
Location of Harmony, Maryland

Harmony is an unincorporated community in Caroline County, Maryland, United States. It is little more than an intersection of state Routes 16 and 578 on Maryland's Eastern Shore. Its original name was Fowling Creek, named after a stream nearby that is a tributary of the Choptank River.

Harmony was the scene of a murder in 1895.

There is a small country store with one gas pump, a church, a local produce stand, and farmland. While many of the farmers in the area are of German descent as can be seen in last names such as Mueller, Kraus, Thomas, Steenken, and Worm; they settled after the Civil War, filling the void of the men lost in the war. The older families of Towers, Todd, and Wyddel were the original settlers who came from England in the early eighteenth century, as can be confirmed from the original patents granted to them one of which is Wyddels Venture, the oldest century farm in the county. These names can be seen on the 1875 Map of Caroline County.

The soil is sandy and requires irrigation. There are many cash crops grown such as sweet corn, cantaloupes, tomatoes and squash. Some farms also have chicken houses as a second means of income.
