= Linchester, Maryland =

Unincorporated community in Maryland, U.S.

Coordinates: 38°42′03″N 75°53′46″W

Linchester is an unincorporated community in Caroline County, Maryland, United States. The community's name is a portmanteau of Caroline County and that of neighboring Dorchester County.
