= Vienna, Maryland =

- Town
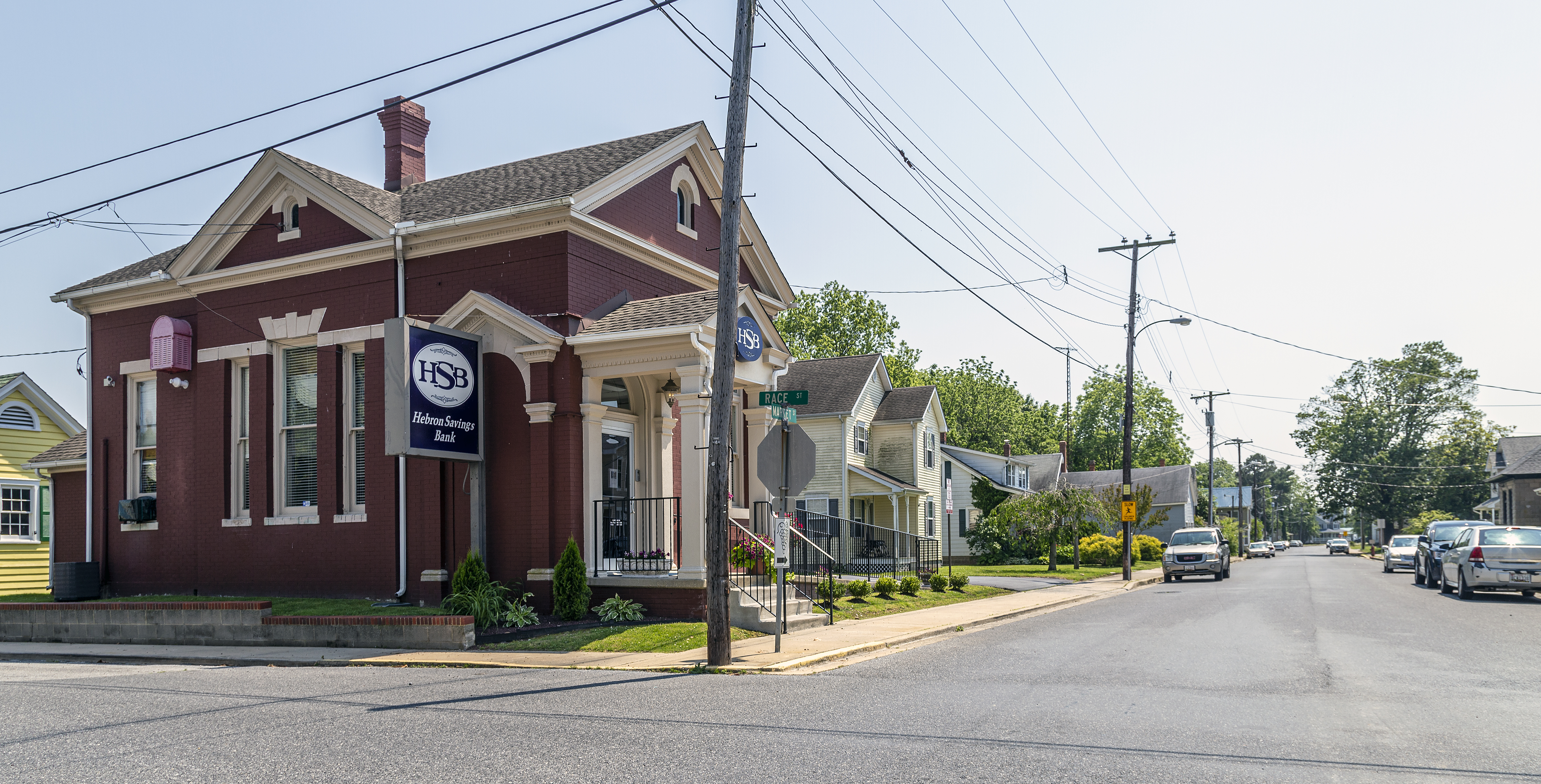
- Center of Vienna
- Motto: "Gateway to the Nanticoke"
- Location of Vienna, Maryland
- Coordinates: 38°29′7″N 75°49′37″W
- Country: United States
- State: Maryland
- County: Dorchester
- Founded: 1706
- Incorporated: 1833

Government
  - Mayor: Pamela R. Travers 2021-

Area
  - Total: 0.76 sq mi (1.98 km^{2})
  - Land: 0.76 sq mi (1.98 km^{2})
  - Water: 0 sq mi (0.00 km^{2})
- Elevation: 9.8 ft (3 m)

Population (2020)
  - Total: 270
  - Density: 353.1/sq mi (136.32/km^{2})
- Time zone: UTC-5 (Eastern (EST))
  - Summer (DST): UTC-4 (EDT)
- ZIP code: 21869
- Area code: 410
- FIPS code: 24-80600
- GNIS feature ID: 0591474
- Website: Town of Vienna, Maryland

Vienna is a town in Dorchester County, Maryland, United States. As of the 2020 census, Vienna had a population of 270.

== History ==
Prior to European colonization, a Nanticoke town called "Chicacone" existed where Vienna is now located. The Nanticokes are an Algonquian people. Chicacone was the largest Nanticoke settlement at the time of John Smith's exploration of the Chesapeake Bay in 1608. By 1742, ongoing violations of Indian reservation rights by English colonizers caused the Nanticoke people to abandon Chicacone. In 1768–69, the Colony of Maryland dissolved the Nanticoke reservation. Many of the Nanticokes of Chicacone migrated north to Pennsylvania, New York, and Canada, while others stayed and assimilated into the white or black communities of lower Dorchester and Wicomico counties.

Vienna was founded in 1706. It thrived on trade, shipbuilding and tobacco farming. The wreck of a 45-foot cargo ship that was likely built at a small shipyard or plantation in Maryland was found in 2015 under the US 50 Bridge over the Nanticoke River. Charring suggests it was torched by British sympathizers in the 1780s. The British raided the town repeatedly during the American Revolutionary War, and again during the War of 1812. This led to the building of a wall across the city's waterfront on the Nanticoke River. This wall is in ruins today. Handsell was listed on the National Register of Historic Places in 2008.

Vienna was incorporated in 1833.

== Geography ==
Vienna is located at 38°29′7″N 75°49′37″W (38.485152, -75.827020).

According to the United States Census Bureau, the town has a total area of 0.19 square miles (0.49 km^{2}), all land.

=== Climate ===
Climate data for Vienna, Maryland (1949-2010)
Month	Jan	Feb	Mar	Apr	May	Jun	Jul	Aug	Sep	Oct	Nov	Dec	Year
Record high °F (°C)	80.1 (26.7)	81.0 (27.2)	84.9 (29.4)	95.0 (35.0)	97.0 (36.1)	102.0 (38.9)	104.0 (40.0)	100.0 (37.8)	98.1 (36.7)	95.0 (35.0)	82.9 (28.3)	80.1 (26.7)	104.0 (40.0)
Mean daily maximum °F (°C)	47.8 (8.8)	50.1 (10.1)	58.3 (14.6)	69.3 (20.7)	77.7 (25.4)	85.5 (29.7)	90.1 (32.3)	88.1 (31.2)	81.9 (27.7)	71.7 (22.1)	60.6 (15.9)	51.3 (10.7)	69.4 (20.8)
Daily mean °F (°C)	37.7 (3.2)	39.3 (4.1)	46.9 (8.3)	56.7 (13.7)	65.8 (18.8)	74.3 (23.5)	79.4 (26.3)	77.4 (25.2)	71.2 (21.8)	60.1 (15.6)	49.6 (9.8)	41.3 (5.2)	58.3 (14.6)
Mean daily minimum °F (°C)	27.7 (−2.4)	28.5 (−1.9)	35.5 (1.9)	44.1 (6.7)	54.0 (12.2)	63.1 (17.3)	68.7 (20.4)	66.6 (19.2)	60.5 (15.8)	48.6 (9.2)	38.5 (3.6)	31.2 (−0.4)	47.3 (8.5)
Record low °F (°C)	−4.0 (−20.0)	−6.0 (−21.1)	7.0 (−13.9)	24.1 (−4.4)	32.0 (0.0)	43.0 (6.1)	48.0 (8.9)	43.0 (6.1)	32.0 (0.0)	26.1 (−3.3)	14.0 (−10.0)	−2.9 (−19.4)	−6.0 (−21.1)
Average precipitation inches (mm)	3.45 (87.6)	2.96 (75.2)	3.94 (100.1)	3.48 (88.3)	3.30 (83.7)	3.92 (99.6)	3.81 (96.8)	4.63 (117.5)	3.70 (93.9)	3.15 (79.9)	3.21 (81.6)	3.37 (85.6)	42.92 (1,089.8)
Average snowfall inches (mm)	3.05 (77.5)	1.95 (49.6)	0.92 (23.3)	0.04 (1.0)	0 (0)	0 (0)	0 (0)	0 (0)	0 (0)	0.02 (0.4)	0.17 (4.4)	1.17 (29.7)	7.32 (185.9)
Average precipitation days (≥ 0.01 in)	8.7	7.7	9.9	9.4	9	8	8.6	8.3	6.9	7.4	8.2	8.8	100.9
Source: NOAA (1949-2010) - (temperature normals 1991-2020)

Highest recorded temperature: 104 °F (40 °C) on July 4, 1997.
Lowest recorded temperature: −6 °F (−21 °C) on February 6, 1996.

== Demographics ==
Historical population
Census	Pop.	Note	%±
1890	424		—
1910	332		—
1920	257		−22.6%
1930	311		21.0%
1940	385		23.8%
1950	414		7.5%
1960	420		1.4%
1970	358		−14.8%
1980	300		−16.2%
1990	264		−12.0%
2000	280		6.1%
2010	271		−3.2%
2020	270		−0.4%
U.S. Decennial Census

=== 2010 census ===
As of the census of 2010, there were 271 people, 115 households, and 71 families living in the town. The population density was 1,426.3 inhabitants per square mile (550.7/km^{2}). There were 143 housing units at an average density of 752.6 per square mile (290.6/km^{2}). The racial makeup of the town was 90.8% White, 7.0% African American, 0.7% from other races, and 1.5% from two or more races. Hispanic or Latino of any race were 0.7% of the population.

There were 115 households, of which 27.0% had children under the age of 18 living with them, 46.1% were married couples living together, 11.3% had a female householder with no husband present, 4.3% had a male householder with no wife present, and 38.3% were non-families. 27.8% of all households were made up of individuals, and 11.3% had someone living alone who was 65 years of age or older. The average household size was 2.36 and the average family size was 2.87.

The median age in the town was 46.9 years. 19.9% of residents were under the age of 18; 4.8% were between the ages of 18 and 24; 22.8% were from 25 to 44; 28.7% were from 45 to 64; and 23.6% were 65 years of age or older. The gender makeup of the town was 46.9% male and 53.1% female.

=== 2000 census ===
As of the census of 2000, there were 280 people, 120 households, and 81 families living in the town. The population density was 1,519.2 inhabitants per square mile (586.6/km^{2}). There were 138 housing units at an average density of 748.8 per square mile (289.1/km^{2}). The racial makeup of the town was 90.71% White, 5.36% African American, 0.36% Native American, 1.79% Asian, and 1.79% from two or more races. Hispanic or Latino of any race were 0.36% of the population.

There were 120 households, out of which 28.3% had children under the age of 18 living with them, 50.8% were married couples living together, 11.7% had a female householder with no husband present, and 32.5% were non-families. 30.0% of all households were made up of individuals, and 16.7% had someone living alone who was 65 years of age or older. The average household size was 2.33 and the average family size was 2.85.

In the town, the population was spread out, with 22.9% under the age of 18, 5.0% from 18 to 24, 24.6% from 25 to 44, 24.6% from 45 to 64, and 22.9% who were 65 years of age or older. The median age was 42 years. For every 100 females, there were 80.6 males. For every 100 females age 18 and over, there were 77.0 males.

The median income for a household in the town was $34,886, and the median income for a family was $46,250. Males had a median income of $28,542 versus $20,313 for females. The per capita income for the town was $18,082. About 4.7% of families and 4.5% of the population were below the poverty line, including 9.4% of those under the age of eighteen and 1.7% of those 65 or over.

== Infrastructure ==
=== Major highways ===
Vienna is traversed by several Delmarva highways:

- Maryland Route 731 leads straight into the center of town, meeting a dead end where the old drawbridge span over the Nanticoke River was located. The road is also known as Old Route 50, as it was once US 50.
- Maryland Route 331 (Rhodesdale-Vienna Road) travels north out of the town, bound for Rhodesdale. It starts at Old US 50 and travels north through the middle of town, interchanging with US 50.
- U.S. Route 50 bypasses Vienna to the northeast on a small, four-lane freeway section completed in 1991. This section also incorporates the Nanticoke Memorial Bridge, which replaced the original drawbridge span.

=== Navigable rivers ===
Vienna is on the north bank of the Nanticoke River.

=== Public transportation ===
Vienna is accessible by the Delmarva Community Transit commuter bus service.

== Notable people ==
- Josiah Kerr, Republican Congressman from Maryland representing Maryland's 1st congressional district, 1900–1901.
- Thomas Holliday Hicks, governor of the State of Maryland during the American Civil War.
- James M. Cain, author of "The Postman Always Rings Twice".
