= Hurlock, Maryland =

- Town
- Flag Seal
- Motto: "On track since 1892"
- Location of Hurlock, Maryland
- Coordinates: 38°37′53″N 75°51′40″W
- Country: United States
- State: Maryland
- County: Dorchester
- Incorporated: 1892

Area
  - Total: 2.89 sq mi (7.48 km^{2})
  - Land: 2.67 sq mi (6.91 km^{2})
  - Water: 0.22 sq mi (0.57 km^{2})
- Elevation: 39 ft (12 m)

Population (2020)
  - Total: 2,070
  - Density: 775.8/sq mi (299.54/km^{2})
- Time zone: UTC-5 (Eastern (EST))
  - Summer (DST): UTC-4 (EDT)
- ZIP code: 21643
- Area code: 410
- FIPS code: 24-41125
- GNIS feature ID: 0590523
- Website: Hurlock, Maryland

Hurlock is a town in Dorchester County, Maryland, United States. As of the 2020 census, Hurlock had a population of 2,070.

== History ==
The town was named after John M. Hurlock, a local store owner. The community was incorporated in 1892.

== Geography ==
Hurlock is located at 38°37′53″N 75°51′40″W.

According to the United States Census Bureau, the town has a total area of 2.88 square miles (7.46 km^{2}), of which 2.66 square miles (6.89 km^{2}) is land and 0.22 square miles (0.57 km^{2}) is water.

== Demographics ==
Historical population
Census	Pop.	Note	%±
1900	280		—
1910	516		84.3%
1920	1,075		108.3%
1930	765		−28.8%
1940	800		4.6%
1950	944		18.0%
1960	1,035		9.6%
1970	1,056		2.0%
1980	1,690		60.0%
1990	1,706		0.9%
2000	1,874		9.8%
2010	2,092		11.6%
2020	2,070		−1.1%
U.S. Decennial Census

=== 2020 census ===
As of the 2020 census, Hurlock had a population of 2,070. The median age was 39.4 years. 25.9% of residents were under the age of 18 and 16.9% of residents were 65 years of age or older. For every 100 females there were 88.2 males, and for every 100 females age 18 and over there were 84.2 males age 18 and over.

0.0% of residents lived in urban areas, while 100.0% lived in rural areas.

There were 786 households in Hurlock, of which 36.0% had children under the age of 18 living in them. Of all households, 35.6% were married-couple households, 17.9% were households with a male householder and no spouse or partner present, and 38.3% were households with a female householder and no spouse or partner present. About 30.7% of all households were made up of individuals and 13.1% had someone living alone who was 65 years of age or older.

There were 869 housing units, of which 9.6% were vacant. The homeowner vacancy rate was 3.9% and the rental vacancy rate was 7.1%.

Racial composition as of the 2020 census
Race	Number	Percent
White	984	47.5%
Black or African American	825	39.9%
American Indian and Alaska Native	3	0.1%
Asian	17	0.8%
Native Hawaiian and Other Pacific Islander	0	0.0%
Some other race	86	4.2%
Two or more races	155	7.5%
Hispanic or Latino (of any race)	138	6.7%

=== 2010 census ===
As of the census of 2010, there were 2,092 people, 788 households, and 536 families living in the town. The population density was 786.5 inhabitants per square mile (303.7/km^{2}). There were 903 housing units at an average density of 339.5 per square mile (131.1/km^{2}). The racial makeup of the town was 55.0% White, 37.5% African American, 0.6% Native American, 0.8% Asian, 3.5% from other races, and 2.6% from two or more races. Hispanic or Latino of any race were 6.7% of the population.

There were 788 households, of which 36.8% had children under the age of 18 living with them, 40.9% were married couples living together, 20.2% had a female householder with no husband present, 7.0% had a male householder with no wife present, and 32.0% were non-families. 27.4% of all households were made up of individuals, and 13.5% had someone living alone who was 65 years of age or older. The average household size was 2.64 and the average family size was 3.18.

The median age in the town was 36 years. 27.5% of residents were under the age of 18; 7.8% were between the ages of 18 and 24; 25.5% were from 25 to 44; 27% were from 45 to 64; and 12.2% were 65 years of age or older. The gender makeup of the town was 48.5% male and 51.5% female.

=== 2000 census ===
As of the census of 2000, there were 1,874 people, 710 households, and 491 families living in the town. The population density was 748.5 inhabitants per square mile (289.0/km^{2}). There were 772 housing units at an average density of 308.4 per square mile (119.1/km^{2}). The racial makeup of the town was 70.46% White, 25.27% African American, 0.16% Native American, 0.85% Asian, 0.21% from other races, and 3.04% from two or more races. Hispanic or Latino of any race were 2.88% of the population.

There were 710 households, out of which 35.8% had children under the age of 18 living with them, 44.2% were married couples living together, 19.2% had a female householder with no husband present, and 30.8% were non-families. 26.6% of all households were made up of individuals, and 12.8% had someone living alone who was 65 years of age or older. The average household size was 2.62 and the average family size was 3.12.

In the town, the population was spread out, with 30.3% under the age of 18, 7.6% from 18 to 24, 28.4% from 25 to 44, 21.6% from 45 to 64, and 12.2% who were 65 years of age or older. The median age was 35 years. For every 100 females, there were 85.5 males. For every 100 females age 18 and over, there were 81.8 males.

The median income for a household in the town was $32,935, and the median income for a family was $40,435. Males had a median income of $29,697 versus $21,555 for females. The per capita income for the town was $15,446. About 8.2% of families and 11.4% of the population were below the poverty line, including 14.8% of those under age 18 and 13.0% of those age 65 or over.

== Arts and culture ==
=== Hurlock Fall Festival ===
The annual Hurlock Fall Festival, held on the first Saturday of October, started in 1992. It begins with a parade featuring local school bands, volunteer fire companies, and antique cars. Vendors of arts, crafts and food line the streets in the vicinity of the town's historic train station, where the Hurlock Express offers 1-hour round-trip rides to Federalsburg, Maryland. The town owns the train station and two restored passenger cars, which are pulled by a locomotive provided by the Maryland and Delaware Railroad.

== Government ==
Charles T. Cephas is the current mayor, and the town has five council members: David Higgins (District 1), Bonnie Franz (District 2), Russell Murphy (District 3), Jock Orr (District 4), and Earl Murphy (District 5-At-Large).

== Education ==
The Dorchester County Public Schools includes the North Dorchester High School.

== Media ==
Hurlock is home to WAAI radio.

== Notable people ==
- William N. Andrews, U.S. Representative for Maryland's 1st congressional district (1919–1921), born in Hurlock on November 13, 1876.
- Carlton Dotson, convicted of murdering fellow Baylor University basketball player Patrick Dennehy.
