= Secretary, Maryland =

- Town
- Flag Seal

- Location of Secretary, Maryland
- Coordinates: 38°36′36″N 75°56′56″W
- Country: United States
- State: Maryland
- County: Dorchester
- Incorporated: 1900

Area
  - Total: 0.29 sq mi (0.75 km^{2})
  - Land: 0.29 sq mi (0.75 km^{2})
  - Water: 0 sq mi (0.00 km^{2})
- Elevation: 20 ft (6 m)

Population (2020)
  - Total: 472
  - Density: 1,621/sq mi (625.7/km^{2})
- Time zone: UTC-5 (Eastern (EST))
  - Summer (DST): UTC-4 (EDT)
- ZIP code: 21664
- Area code: 410
- FIPS code: 24-70900
- GNIS feature ID: 0591244
- Website: https://townofsecretary.com/

Secretary is a town in Dorchester County, Maryland, United States. As of the 2020 census, Secretary had a population of 472.

Lord Baltimore named the town after his secretary.

== Geography ==
Secretary is located at 38°36′36″N 75°56′56″W (38.609886, -75.949006).

According to the United States Census Bureau, the town has a total area of 0.26 square miles (0.67 km^{2}), all land.

== Demographics ==
Historical population
Census	Pop.	Note	%±
1900	410		—
1910	409		−0.2%
1920	398		−2.7%
1930	361		−9.3%
1940	344		−4.7%
1950	344		0.0%
1960	351		2.0%
1970	352		0.3%
1980	487		38.4%
1990	528		8.4%
2000	503		−4.7%
2010	535		6.4%
2020	472		−11.8%
U.S. Decennial Census

=== 2010 census ===
As of the census of 2010, there were 535 people, 213 households, and 157 families living in the town. The population density was 2,057.7 inhabitants per square mile (794.5/km^{2}). There were 234 housing units at an average density of 900.0 per square mile (347.5/km^{2}). The racial makeup of the town was 88.4% White, 6.4% African American, 0.4% Native American, 0.2% Asian, 3.7% from other races, and 0.9% from two or more races. Hispanic or Latino of any race were 7.3% of the population.

There were 213 households, of which 32.4% had children under the age of 18 living with them, 51.6% were married couples living together, 17.4% had a female householder with no husband present, 4.7% had a male householder with no wife present, and 26.3% were non-families. 20.2% of all households were made up of individuals, and 10.8% had someone living alone who was 65 years of age or older. The average household size was 2.51 and the average family size was 2.86.

The median age in the town was 43.6 years. 23% of residents were under the age of 18; 4.4% were between the ages of 18 and 24; 24.8% were from 25 to 44; 30.8% were from 45 to 64; and 17% were 65 years of age or older. The gender makeup of the town was 49.0% male and 51.0% female.

=== 2000 census ===
As of the census of 2000, there were 503 people, 197 households, and 146 families living in the town. The population density was 1,944.1 inhabitants per square mile (750.6/km^{2}). There were 218 housing units at an average density of 842.6 per square mile (325.3/km^{2}). The racial makeup of the town was 97.22% White, 0.60% African American, 0.20% Native American, 0.80% Asian, 0.99% from other races, and 0.20% from two or more races. Hispanic or Latino of any race were 3.98% of the population.

There were 197 households, out of which 33.5% had children under the age of 18 living with them, 57.4% were married couples living together, 13.7% had a female householder with no husband present, and 25.4% were non-families. 20.8% of all households were made up of individuals, and 7.6% had someone living alone who was 65 years of age or older. The average household size was 2.54 and the average family size was 2.92.

In the town, the population was spread out, with 23.5% under the age of 18, 7.0% from 18 to 24, 31.4% from 25 to 44, 25.6% from 45 to 64, and 12.5% who were 65 years of age or older. The median age was 38 years. For every 100 females, there were 95.7 males. For every 100 females age 18 and over, there were 91.5 males.

The median income for a household in the town was $39,063, and the median income for a family was $40,441. Males had a median income of $26,023 versus $22,292 for females. The per capita income for the town was $15,881. About 10.3% of families and 12.7% of the population were below the poverty line, including 14.1% of those under age 18 and 15.3% of those age 65 or over.
