= Preston, Maryland =

- Town
- Town of Preston
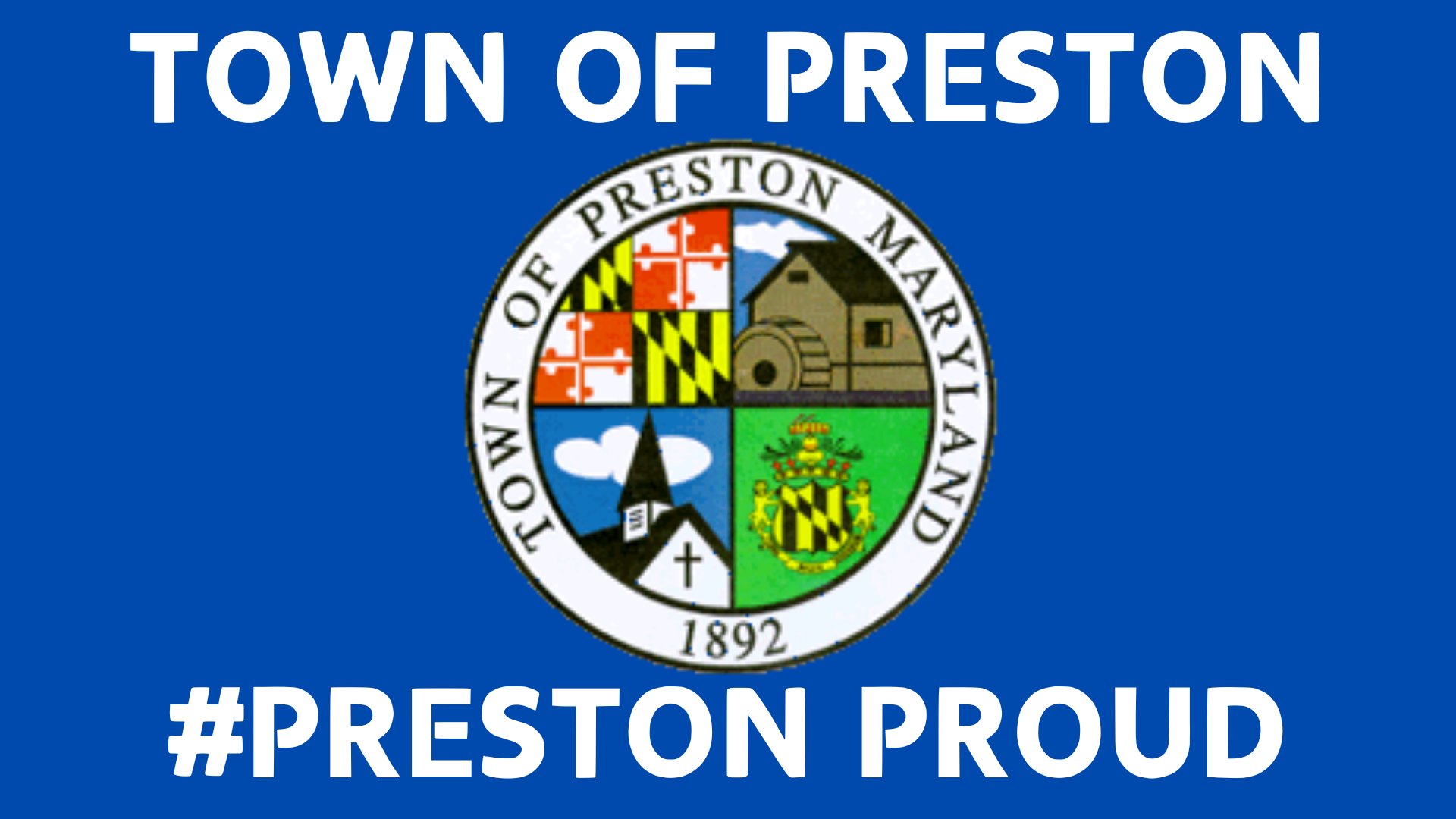
- Flag Seal
- Nickname: "The Biggest Little Town In The USA!"
- Location of Preston, Maryland

- Location within the U.S. state of Maryland Preston (the United States)
- Coordinates: 38°42′39″N 75°54′30″W
- Country: United States of America
- State: Maryland
- County: Caroline
- Incorporated: 1892

Area
  - Total: 0.56 sq mi (1.45 km^{2})
  - Land: 0.55 sq mi (1.42 km^{2})
  - Water: 0.012 sq mi (0.03 km^{2})
- Elevation: 46 ft (14 m)

Population (2020)
  - Total: 673
  - Density: 1,226.9/sq mi (473.72/km^{2})
- Time zone: UTC-5 (Eastern (EST))
  - Summer (DST): UTC-4 (EDT)
- ZIP code: 21655
- Area code: 410
- FIPS code: 24-63825
- GNIS feature ID: 1681813
- Website: www.prestonmaryland.us

Preston is a town in Caroline County, Maryland, United States. As of the 2020 census, Preston had a population of 673.

== History ==
Preston is home to the Linchester Mill, c. 1682. During the Revolutionary War it supplied grain to George Washington's troops. It was listed on the National Register of Historic Places in 2009 along with the Jacob and Hannah Leverton House.

Boating publisher Monk Farnham once resided in the town; he established a world record as the oldest person to sail solo across the Atlantic Ocean.

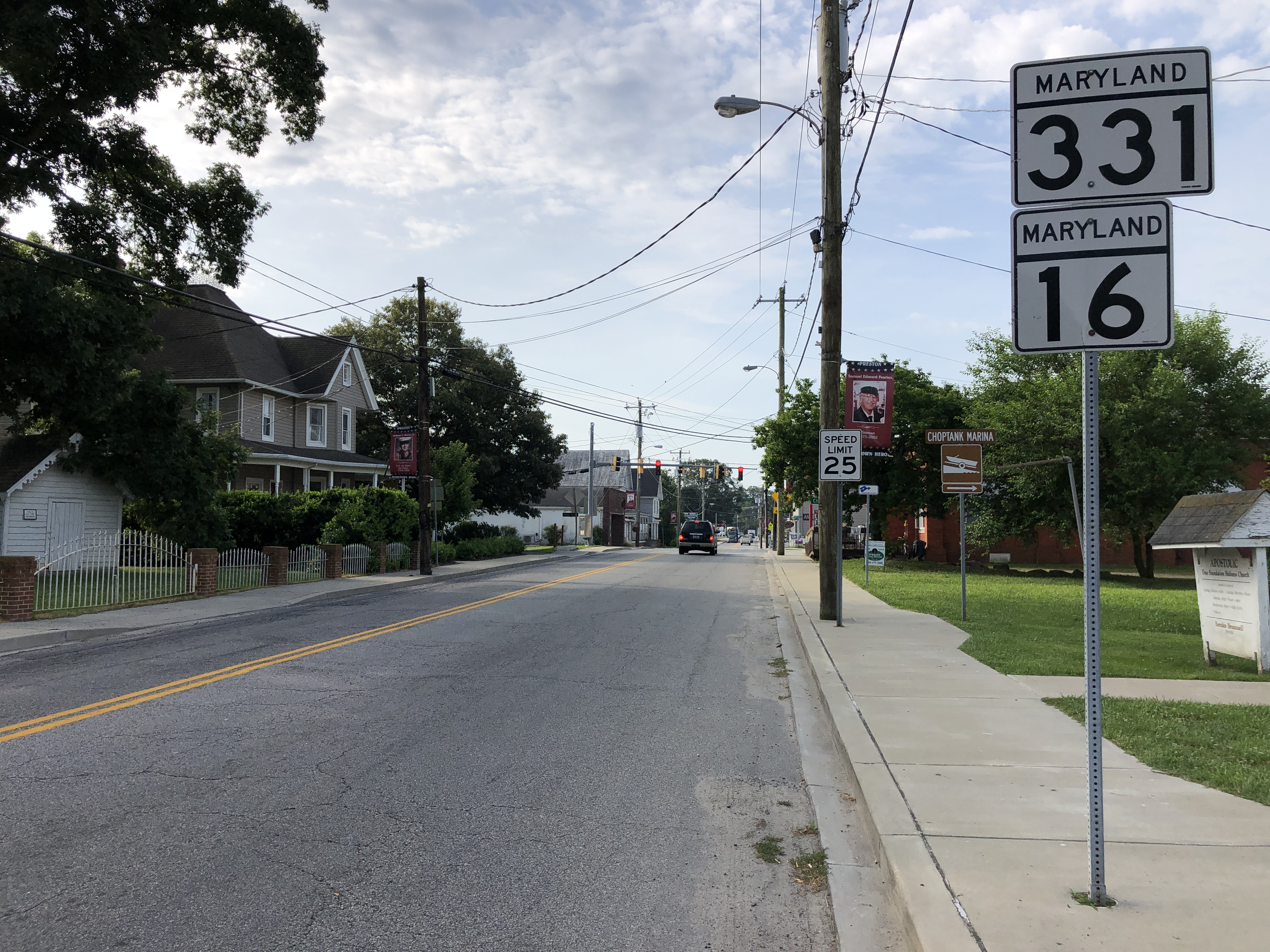
MD 16 and MD 331 running concurrently through central Preston

== Transportation ==
The primary means of travel to and from Preston is by road, and four state highways serve the town. Maryland Route 16 enters from the northeast, while Maryland Route 331 enters from the northwest. They become concurrent within town limits and exit the town together towards the southeast. Maryland Route 324 and Maryland Route 817 also traverse the town, serving as local connectors.

== Geography ==
Preston is located at 38°42′39″N 75°54′30″W (38.710883, -75.908297).

According to the United States Census Bureau, the town has a total area of 0.57 square miles (1.48 km^{2}), all land.

=== Climate ===
The climate in this area is characterized by hot, humid summers and generally mild to cool winters. According to the Köppen Climate Classification system, Preston has a humid subtropical climate, abbreviated "Cfa" on climate maps.

== Demographics ==
Historical population
Census	Pop.	Note	%±
1880	156		—
1900	192		—
1910	288		50.0%
1920	784		172.2%
1930	315		−59.8%
1940	369		17.1%
1950	353		−4.3%
1960	469		32.9%
1970	509		8.5%
1980	498		−2.2%
1990	437		−12.2%
2000	566		29.5%
2010	719		27.0%
2020	673		−6.4%
U.S. Decennial Census

=== 2010 census ===
As of the census of 2010, there were 719 people, 264 households, and 190 families living in the town. The population density was 1,261.4 inhabitants per square mile (487.0/km^{2}). There were 295 housing units at an average density of 517.5 per square mile (199.8/km^{2}). The racial makeup of the town was 89.0% White, 6.3% African American, 0.4% Native American, 1.1% Asian, 0.4% from other races, and 2.8% from two or more races. Hispanic or Latino of any race were 1.0% of the population.

There were 264 households, of which 40.2% had children under the age of 18 living with them, 56.4% were married couples living together, 8.0% had a female householder with no husband present, 7.6% had a male householder with no wife present, and 28.0% were non-families. 22.3% of all households were made up of individuals, and 10.7% had someone living alone who was 65 years of age or older. The average household size was 2.72 and the average family size was 3.14.

The median age in the town was 35.2 years. 27.1% of residents were under the age of 18; 5.8% were between the ages of 18 and 24; 30.4% were from 25 to 44; 24.5% were from 45 to 64; and 12.1% were 65 years of age or older. The gender makeup of the town was 49.7% male and 50.3% female.

=== 2000 census ===
As of the census of 2000, there were 566 people, 225 households, and 168 families living in the town. The population density was 1,009.2 inhabitants per square mile (389.7/km^{2}). There were 242 housing units at an average density of 431.5 per square mile (166.6/km^{2}). The racial makeup of the town was 92.93% White, 4.77% African American, 0.71% Native American, 1.41% Asian, 0.18% from other races.

There were 225 households, out of which 32.4% had children under the age of 18 living with them, 61.8% were married couples living together, 9.8% had a female householder with no husband present, and 24.9% were non-families. 20.0% of all households were made up of individuals, and 7.1% had someone living alone who was 65 years of age or older. The average household size was 2.52 and the average family size was 2.86.

In the town, the population was spread out, with 25.3% under the age of 18, 4.9% from 18 to 24, 38.2% from 25 to 44, 17.1% from 45 to 64, and 14.5% who were 65 years of age or older. The median age was 36 years. For every 100 females, there were 101.4 males. For every 100 females age 18 and over, there were 93.2 males.

The median income for a household in the town was $48,125, and the median income for a family was $53,365. Males had a median income of $37,083 versus $23,182 for females. The per capita income for the town was $20,617. About 3.6% of families and 4.9% of the population were below the poverty line, including 7.9% of those under age 18 and 5.2% of those age 65 or over.
