= Maryland Route 313 =

Highway in Maryland

Maryland Route 313

Route information
- Maintained by MDSHA
- Length: 75.72 mi (121.86 km)
- Existed: 1927–present
- Tourist routes: Harriet Tubman Underground Railroad Byway; Chesapeake Country Scenic Byway

Major junctions
- South end: US 50 in Mardela Springs
- MD 54 in Mardela Springs; MD 318 in Federalsburg; MD 404 in Denton; MD 314 in Greensboro; MD 287 in Goldsboro; MD 302 in Barclay; MD 300 in Sudlersville; MD 291 in Millington; US 301 near Massey; MD 290 near Galena
- North end: MD 213 / MD 290 in Galena

Location
- Country: United States
- State: Maryland
- Counties: Wicomico, Dorchester, Caroline, Queen Anne's, Kent

Highway system
- Maryland highway system; Interstate; US; State; Scenic Byways
← MD 312	→ MD 314

Maryland Route 313 (MD 313) is a state highway located on the Eastern Shore of Maryland in the United States. The 75.72-mile (121.86 km) route runs from U.S. Route 50 (US 50) in Mardela Springs, Wicomico County, north to MD 213 and MD 290 in Galena, Kent County. It is predominantly a rural two-lane undivided road that runs through agricultural areas a short distance west of the Delaware state line, with the exception of a four-lane divided bypass of Denton that is concurrent with MD 404. MD 313 serves many communities, including Sharptown, Eldorado, Federalsburg, Denton, Greensboro, Goldsboro, Barclay, Sudlersville, Millington, and Massey. The route intersects many major roads, including MD 54 in Mardela Springs, MD 404 in the Denton area, MD 302 in Barclay, MD 300 in Sudlersville, and US 301 near Massey.

The designation MD 313 was first used in 1927 for the road running from Eldorado to Galena, while the portion south to Mardela Springs was designated a part of US 213. By 1933, the route was extended to Mardela Springs following a realignment of US 213. MD 313 was rerouted to bypass Ingleside in 1949 and Greensboro in 1950. The route was moved to its current alignment between Federalsburg and Denton in 1954, replacing what had been briefly designated MD 322 between Federalsburg and Andersontown. The former alignment is now Auction Road and American Corner Road (formerly designated MD 630) and MD 16. The route bypassed Federalsburg in 1964. MD 313 was moved to a one-way pair in Denton along with MD 404 in 1972. In 1987, MD 313 and MD 404 were moved onto the four-lane divided bypass of the town. The original routing of MD 313 in Denton is designated MD 619. The divided highway in the Denton area was extended further south in the early 2000s. The remaining two-lane portions of MD 313 that are concurrent with MD 404 are slated to be upgraded to a four-lane divided highway to provide relief to beach traffic along MD 404, a part of the main route between the Chesapeake Bay Bridge and the Delaware Beaches.

== Route description ==
MD 313 runs through rural areas of woods and farms on the Eastern Shore of Maryland, generally a short distance west of the Delaware state line. The route heads through five counties in Maryland from south to north: Wicomico, Dorchester, Caroline, Queen Anne's, and Kent. It connects several towns including Mardela Springs and Sharptown in Wicomico County, Eldorado in Dorchester County, Federalsburg, Denton, Greensboro and Goldsboro in Caroline County, Barclay and Sudlersville in Queen Anne's County, and Millington and Galena in Kent County. MD 313 is a part of the National Highway System along its concurrency with MD 404 from Andersontown to Denton.

=== Wicomico and Dorchester counties ===
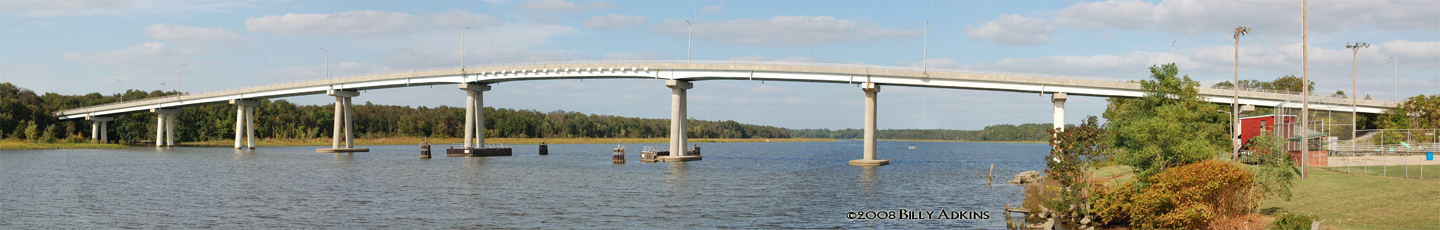
Sharptown Bridge over the Nanticoke River

MD 313 begins at an intersection with US 50 in the town of Mardela Springs, Wicomico County, where the route heads east past residences along Delmar Road, a two-lane undivided road. A short distance past US 50, the route turns north onto Sharptown Road, with MD 54 continuing east on Delmar Road toward the Delaware-Maryland state line town of Delmar. The route passes west of Mardela Middle and High School and continues north past more residences before it leaves Mardela Springs and heads into farmland a short distance west of the Delaware state line. It continues through a mix of woods and farms with some residences, crossing Plum Creek before reaching the town of Sharptown. Here, the road intersects unsigned MD 813F (Twiford Road). MD 313 bypasses Sharptown to the south and intersects MD 348 (Laurel Road). Past this intersection, the route turns north and runs along the eastern edge of the town before crossing over the Nanticoke River on the Sharptown Bridge.

Upon crossing the Nanticoke River, MD 313 enters Dorchester County and heads northwest through wooded areas before continuing into a mix of woodland and farmland. It turns west before heading northwest again and reaching the town of Eldorado. Here, the route intersects the eastern terminus of MD 14 (Rhodesdale Eldorado Road). At this intersection, MD 313 makes a right turn to head north on Eldorado Road. The route leaves Eldorado and it continues through farmland with some patches of woods. It intersects MD 392 (Finchville Reliance Road) in Finchville and passes more farming areas with intermittent residences before coming to an intersection with MD 577 (Reliance Road) on the Caroline County border in Allens Corner.

=== Caroline County ===
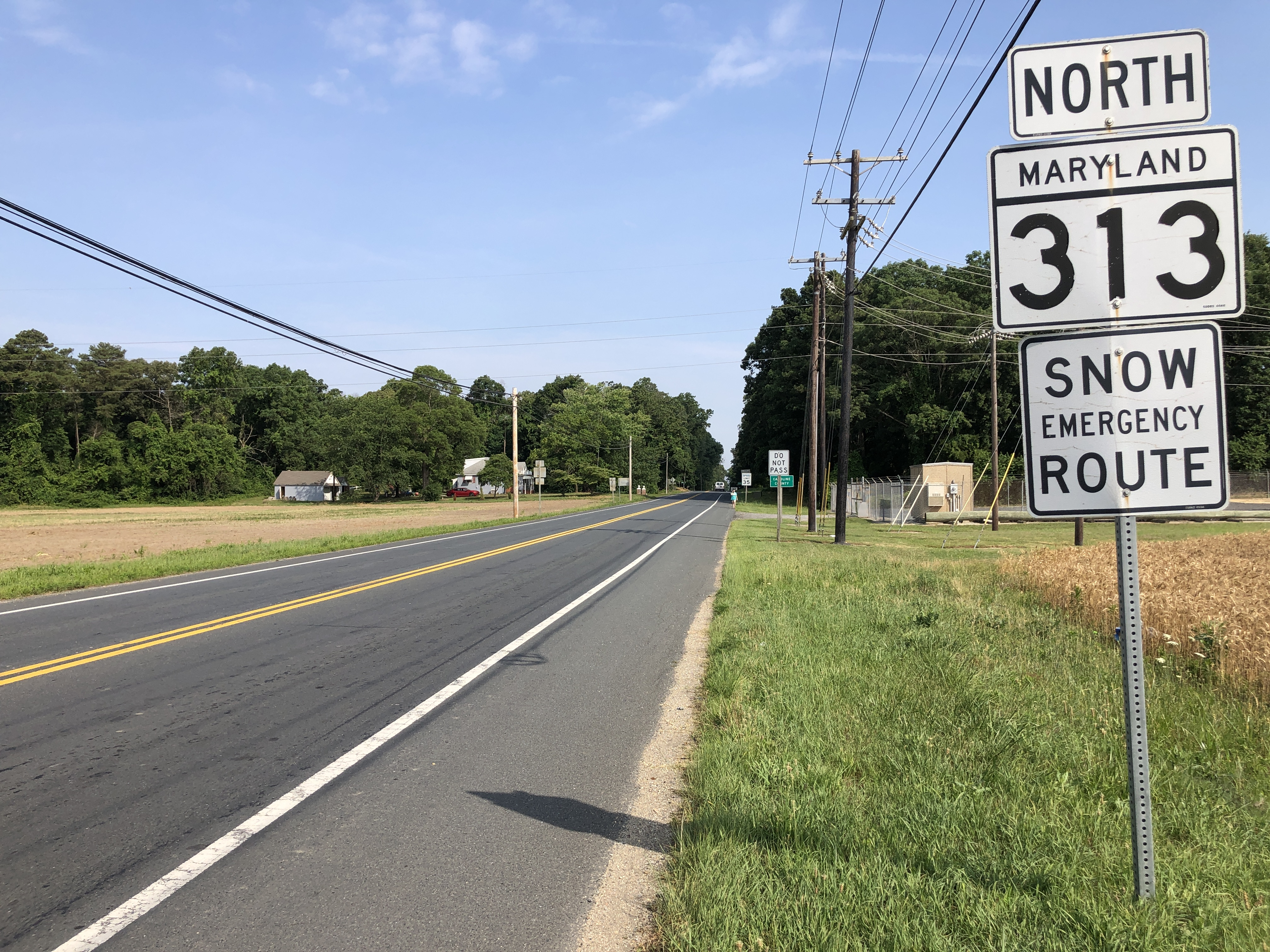
MD 313 northbound past MD 577 in Allens Corner

At the MD 577 intersection, MD 313 runs northwest along the border of Caroline and Dorchester counties as Reliance Road. The route heads toward the town of Federalsburg, passing through a mix of agricultural and residential areas. The route then leaves the border line and enters Caroline County, intersecting MD 318 (Federalsburg Highway) and making a left turn to form a concurrency with that route. The two routes bypass Federalsburg to the south, crossing over Marshyhope Creek. After crossing the creek, the road intersects MD 308 (South Main Street). The road passes an industrial park before turning north into wooded areas and crossing the Maryland and Delaware Railroad's Seaford Line at-grade. After the railroad crossing, MD 313/MD 318 intersect MD 307 (Williamsburg Road) at a roundabout located in the southwestern corner of Federalsburg. A short distance later, MD 318 splits from MD 313 by heading west on Preston Road while MD 315 continues east into Federalsburg on Bloomingdale Avenue. Past this intersection, MD 313 continues north on the Federalsburg Highway, leaving the Federalsburg area and heading into a mix of woodland and farmland.

In Andersontown, MD 313 intersects MD 16/MD 404 (Shore Highway). Here, the route makes a northwest turn onto that road, forming a three-route concurrency. At this point, the Shore Highway heads northwest through a mix of woods and farms with some homes before widening to a four-lane divided highway. Upon widening into a divided highway, MD 16 splits from MD 313/MD 404 at an intersection and heads west on Harmony Road. Past this intersection, MD 313/MD 404 cross over Watts Creek and heads north through farmland, passing east of Martinak State Park.

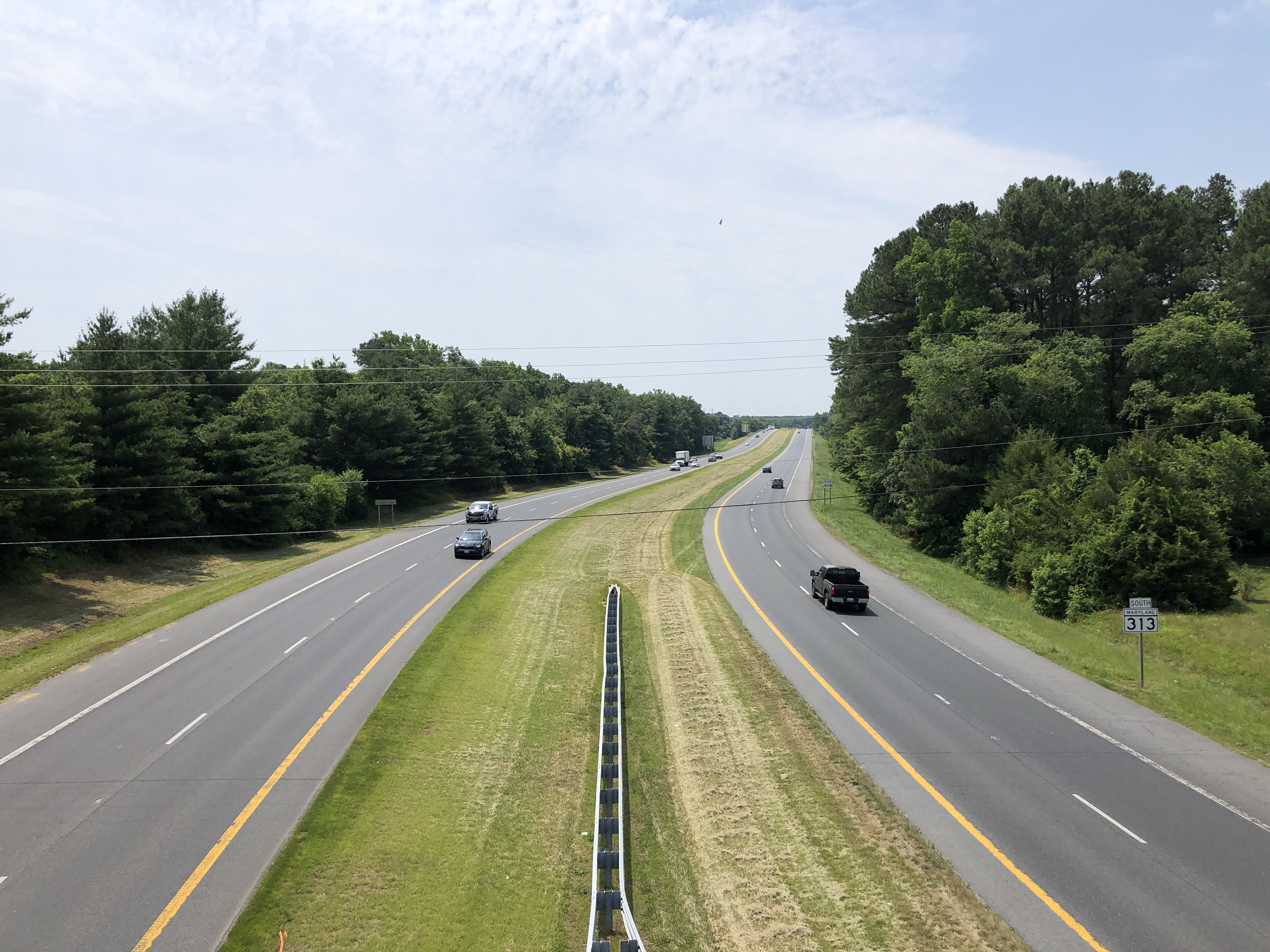
MD 313 southbound/MD 404 eastbound in Denton

The road heads into commercial areas in the southern part of the town of Denton. The road turns northeast into woods and intersects the eastern terminus of MD 404 Bus. (Franklin Street/Gay Street) at an at-grade intersection. Past this intersection, MD 313/MD 404 become a freeway and head north, passing residential neighborhoods and woodland along the eastern side of Denton. The road turns to the west and comes to a diamond interchange where MD 313 splits from the MD 404 freeway by heading north on two-lane undivided Greensboro Road and MD 619 heads south into Denton on Sixth Street.

The route heads through farmland before passing residences and intersecting the western terminus of MD 317 (Burrsville Road) in Oil City. Past MD 317, the road continues through mostly wooded areas with some residences and farmland. It reaches the town of Greensboro, where MD 313 intersects MD 314 (Whiteleysburg Road). The route crosses the Choptank River past MD 314 and continues to the intersection with the eastern terminus of MD 480 (Ridgely Road) just north of Greensboro. The road continues north through agricultural areas before entering the town of Goldsboro, where the route becomes Old Town Road. In Goldsboro, MD 313 crosses an unused railroad grade owned by the Maryland Department of Transportation and intersects the southern terminus of MD 311 (Main Street), continuing through residential areas before coming to an intersection with the western terminus of MD 287 (Old Line Road). Here, the route makes a left turn to head west on Goldsboro Road. MD 313 leaves Goldsboro and heads into a mix of farmland and woodland. The road curves northwest and intersects unsigned MD 820 (Castle Hall Road), where it heads back to the west. MD 313 turns to the northwest and intersects the northern terminus of MD 312 (Oakland Road) in Baltimore Corner, where it heads north through farm fields past that intersection.

=== Queen Anne's County ===
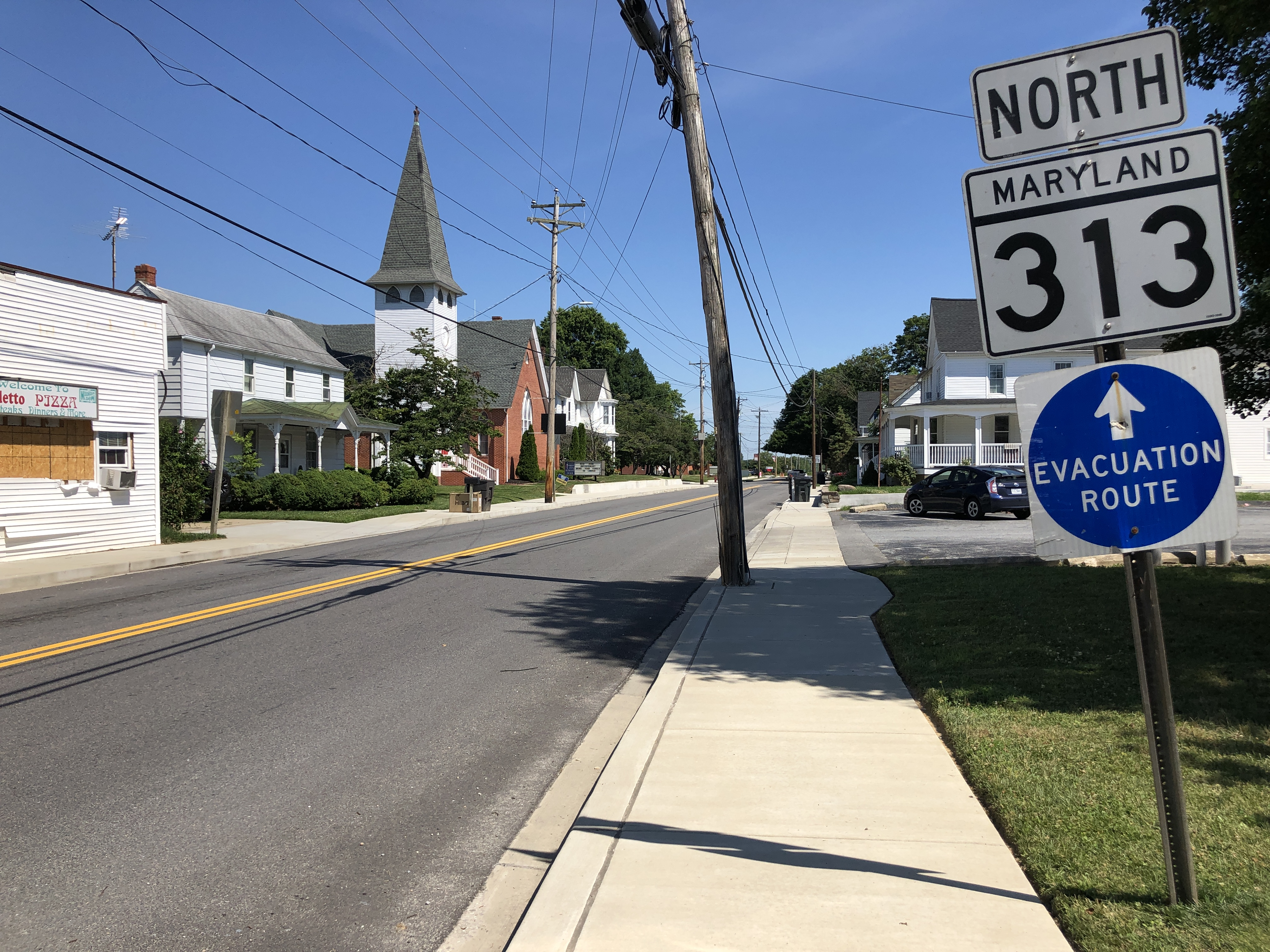
View north along MD 313 at MD 300 in Sudlersville

MD 313 crosses Long Marsh Ditch into Queen Anne's County and continues north through more farmland, before intersecting the eastern terminus of MD 19 (Roberts Station Road) in Ingleside. The route proceeds north before reaching the town of Barclay. Here, the road passes residences and intersects MD 302 (Church Street). Past this intersection, the road crosses the Centreville Branch of the Northern Line of the Maryland and Delaware Railroad at-grade before leaving Barclay and heading back into agricultural areas. The Maryland and Delaware Railroad line runs a short distance to the east of MD 313 before eventually running next to the road as it passes through a mix of farms, woods, and residences. The route enters the town of Sudlersville, where it passes through residential areas in the town on Church Street, with the railroad line drawing farther to the east. In the center of town, the road intersects MD 300 (Main Street). Past the MD 300 intersection, MD 313 intersects MD 837 (Church Circle), an unsigned loop that leads southwest to MD 300.

Upon leaving Sudlersville, the route becomes Millington Road and continues north through farm fields with intermittent residences. MD 313 heads into forested areas as it runs a short distance to the east of US 301. It leaves the woodland as it intersects the eastern terminus of MD 544 (McGinnes Road). The route heads northeast through a mix of agricultural and residential areas before turning east in a patch of woodland and passing more farm fields and residences. MD 313 turns northeast into wooded residential areas and enters the town of Millington, where it becomes Sassafras Street.

=== Kent County ===
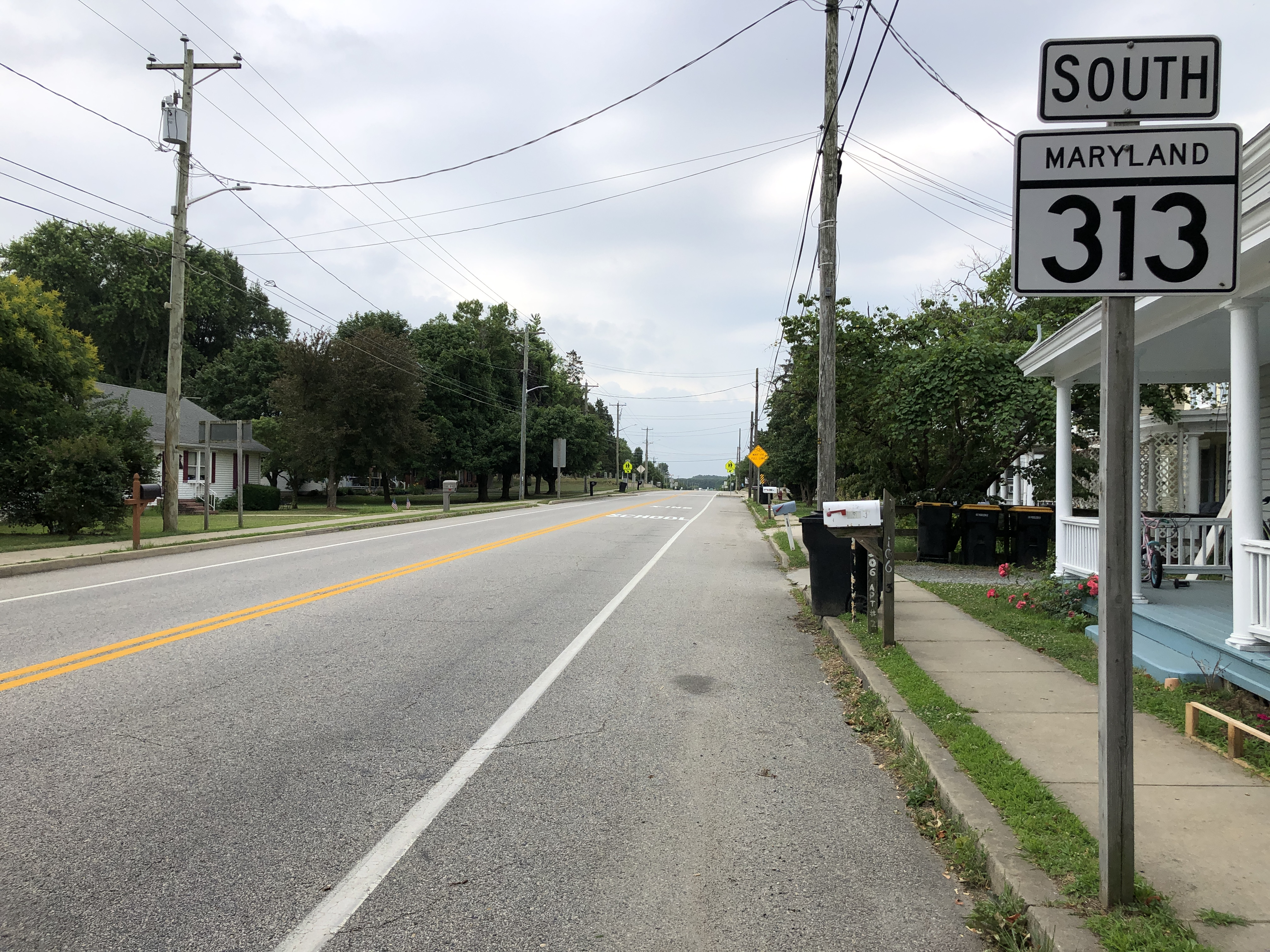
MD 313 southbound past MD 213 in Galena

MD 313 crosses the Chester River into Kent County, where it continues north through Millington and crosses MD 291 (Cypress Street). The road passes more residences before leaving Millington and becoming Galena Road, which passes by farmland and some residences. MD 313 reaches Massey, where it passes by residences before coming to an intersection at the center of town where it makes a left turn to remain along Galena Road. It is here that MD 299 heads north on Massey Road and MD 330 heads east on Maryland Line Road. The route leaves Massey and heads west through farm fields, crossing the Chestertown Branch of the Northern Line of the Maryland and Delaware Railroad at-grade before heading northwest into forested areas. The route intersects the four-lane, divided US 301 (Blue Star Memorial Highway) at a superstreet intersection in which traffic on MD 313 cannot continue directly across US 301 and must use a U-turn ramp in the median of that route.

Past the US 301 intersection, the route officially becomes MD 313A, but is still signed as MD 313. It heads west through farmland before turning north and intersecting MD 290 (Chesterville Road). The two routes continue north together into the town of Galena, where the road becomes Main Street. It passes residences before intersecting MD 213 (Main Street) in the center of town where MD 313 ends, MD 290 turns east on Cross Street, and MD 213 goes northbound on Main Street and southbound by going west on Cross Street.

== History ==
In 1911, what is now MD 313 was built as a state highway between Mardela Springs and Riverton, to the north of Federalsburg, and between south of Denton and Greensboro, with the portions between Riverton and Sharptown and Williston and Denton under contract. At this time, the state highway was under proposal between Sharptown and Eldorado, north of Federalsburg and Williston, and Greensboro and Ingleside. By 1915, the state highway was completed between Riverton and Eldorado and south of Denton and Ingleside. The state road was finished to the north of Eldorado, between Federalsburg and Williston, to the north of Ingleside, to the south of Sudlersville, and from west of Massey to Galena by 1921. At this time, the remainder of the state highway was under proposal between Eldorado and Galena. By 1923, portions of the state highway were completed to the south of Federalsburg, between north of Ingleside and south of Sudlersville, and from north of Sudlersville to west of Massey.

Maryland Route 322
- Location: Federalsburg–Andersontown
- Existed: c. 1952–1954

MD 313 was designated in 1927 to run from US 213 in Eldorado north to US 213 in Galena. The route headed north from Eldorado to Federalsburg, where it continued northwest to Williston, northeast to Denton, north to Goldsboro, northwest to Ingleside, north to Massey, and northwest to Galena. All of MD 313 was state-maintained except for two portions to the south of Federalsburg. At this time, the road between Mardela Springs and Eldorado was designated as part of US 213, which ran from Ocean City to Elkton. By 1933, the southern terminus of MD 313 was extended to US 213 in Mardela Springs when US 213 was rerouted to cross the Nanticoke River in Vienna. At this time, the missing state-maintained segments south of Federalsburg were completed. By 1949, the route was moved to a straight alignment bypassing Ingleside to the east, with the former routing becoming an extended MD 19 and St. Paul Road. In 1950, MD 313 was rerouted to bypass Greensboro to the east. The former alignment through Greensboro became an extended MD 314 along Sunset Avenue and an extended MD 480 along Main Street. Construction on the modern alignment of MD 313 between Federalsburg and Andersontown began by 1950; MD 322 was assigned to the new highway by 1952. In 1954, MD 313 replaced MD 322 on the new highway from Federalsburg to Andersontown and continued concurrent with MD 404 between Andersontown and Denton. The former alignment became MD 630 along Auction Road and American Corner Road between Federalsburg and Bureau and was removed from a concurrency with MD 16 between Bureau and Denton. In 1964, MD 313 was moved to a bypass to the south and west of Federalsburg along with MD 318, with the former alignment through the town becoming Reliance Avenue and MD 315.

In 1972, MD 404 and MD 313 were relocated to a one-way pair, eastbound Franklin Street and westbound Gay Street, through Denton. The routes previously headed south out of Denton on Sixth Street and Fifth Avenue. The former alignment along Sixth Street became MD 619 by 1978. In the early 1980s, construction began to widen MD 313/MD 404 to a divided highway around Denton. By 1985, construction was underway for the four-lane divided bypass of Denton between MD 404 west of Denton and MD 313 north of Denton. In 1987, MD 313 and MD 404 were rerouted to bypass Denton along the newly completed four-lane divided bypass. The former alignment of MD 313 through Denton became MD 404 Bus. along Franklin and Gay streets and MD 619 along Sixth Street. In 1987, MD 313 was moved to a bypass to the north and east of Sharptown, having previously followed State Street through the town. A superstreet intersection was built at US 301 in 2000, resulting in the northern terminus of MD 313 being officially moved to US 301 and the portion of the route between US 301 and MD 213 being designated MD 313A. The divided highway portion of MD 313/MD 404 in the Denton area was extended further in the 2000s from the south end of Denton to the Sennett Road intersection east of where MD 16 joins the two routes. The section between south of Legion Road and Double Hills Road was widened in 2005 while the section between Double Hills Road and Sennett Road was widened in 2007. This project received $3 million from the federal government in 2001. The remaining two-lane portions of MD 313 that are concurrent with MD 404 are slated to be widened into a four-lane divided highway in order to provide relief to travelers driving to the ocean resorts along MD 404. The Federalsburg Bypass bridge over Marshyhope Creek, which was originally built in 1962, was rehabilitated in 2012. During the project, which replaced the bridge's deck, alternating one-way traffic crossed the bridge directed by traffic lights at either end of the construction area.

== Junction list ==
County	Location	mi	km	Destinations	Notes
Wicomico	Mardela Springs	0.00	0.00	US 50 (Ocean Gateway) – Cambridge, Salisbury	Southern terminus of MD 313
Wicomico	Mardela Springs	0.12	0.19	MD 54 east (Delmar Road) – Delmar	Western terminus of MD 54
Wicomico	Sharptown	5.57	8.96	MD 813 (Twiford Road)	
Wicomico	Sharptown	6.12	9.85	MD 348 (Laurel Road) – Sharptown, Laurel, DE	
Dorchester	Eldorado	12.25	19.71	MD 14 west (Rhodesdale Eldorado Road) – Cambridge	Eastern terminus of MD 14
Dorchester	Finchville	15.75	25.35	MD 392 (Finchville Reliance Road) – Hurlock, Seaford	
Dorchester–Caroline county line	Allens Corner	18.93	30.46	MD 577 south (Reliance Road) – Reliance, Seaford	Northern terminus of MD 577
Caroline	Federalsburg	20.13	32.40	MD 318 east (Federalsburg Highway) – Bridgeville	South end of MD 318 overlap
Caroline	Federalsburg	20.64	33.22	MD 308 north (South Main Street) – Federalsburg	Southern terminus of MD 308
Caroline	Federalsburg	21.86	35.18	MD 307 (Williamsburg Road) – Hurlock, Federalsburg	Roundabout
Caroline	Federalsburg	22.32	35.92	MD 318 west (Preston Road) / MD 315 east (Bloomingdale Avenue) – Preston, Federalsburg	North end of MD 318 overlap; western terminus of MD 315
Caroline	Andersontown	32.22	51.85	MD 16 east / MD 404 east (Shore Highway) – Ocean Resorts	South end of MD 16/MD 404 overlap
Caroline	Denton	34.50	55.52	MD 16 west (Harmony Road) – Harmony, Preston, American Corner	North end of MD 16 overlap
Caroline	Denton	36.69	59.05	MD 404 Bus. west (Gay Street/Franklin Street) – Denton	Eastern terminus of MD 404 Bus.
Caroline	Denton	36.69	59.05	South end of freeway section	
Caroline	Denton	38.09	61.30	MD 404 west (Shore Highway) – Bay Bridge, Easton MD 619 south (North Sixth Street) – Denton	Diamond interchange; north end of MD 404 overlap; northern terminus of MD 619
Caroline	Denton	38.09	61.30	North end of freeway section	
Caroline	Oil City	38.86	62.54	MD 317 east (Burrsville Road) – Burrsville, Harrington, Milford	Western terminus of MD 317
Caroline	Greensboro	44.01	70.83	MD 314 (Sunset Avenue/Whiteleysburg Road) – Whiteleysburg, Harrington, Greensboro	
Caroline	Greensboro	44.89	72.24	MD 480 west (Ridgely Road) – Greensboro, Ridgely	Eastern terminus of MD 480
Caroline	Goldsboro	48.40	77.89	MD 311 north (Main Street) – Henderson, Marydel, Smyrna	Southern terminus of MD 311
Caroline	Goldsboro	48.83	78.58	MD 287 east (Old Line Road) to MD 311 – Camden, DE	Western terminus of MD 287
Caroline	Goldsboro	50.13	80.68	MD 820 east (Castle Hall Road)	Western terminus of MD 820
Caroline	Baltimore Corner	52.28	84.14	MD 312 south (Oakland Road) – Ridgely	Northern terminus of MD 312
Queen Anne's	Ingleside	55.01	88.53	MD 19 west (Roberts Station Road) – Ingleside, Church Hill	Eastern terminus of MD 19
Queen Anne's	Barclay	58.74	94.53	MD 302 (Church Street) to US 301 – Templeville, Dover, DE	
Queen Anne's	Sudlersville	61.77	99.41	MD 300 (Main Street) – Church Hill, Chestertown, Dover, DE	
Queen Anne's	Sudlersville	61.84	99.52	MD 837 south (Church Circle)	Northern terminus of MD 837
Queen Anne's	Millington	65.59	105.56	MD 544 west (McGinnes Road) to US 301 – Chestertown	Eastern terminus of MD 544
Kent	Millington	68.03	109.48	MD 291 (Cypress Street) – Chestertown, Smyrna, DE	
Kent	Massey	71.74	115.45	MD 299 north (Massey Road) – Sassafras MD 330 east (Maryland Line Road)	Southern terminus of MD 299; western terminus of MD 330
Kent	Massey	73.19	117.79	US 301 (Blue Star Memorial Highway) – Bay Bridge, Wilmington	Superstreet intersection; northern terminus of MD 313; southern terminus of MD 313A
Kent	Galena	75.00	120.70	MD 290 south (Chesterville Road) – Chesterville	South end of MD 290 overlap
Kent	Galena	75.72	121.86	MD 213 / MD 290 north (Cross Street/Main Street) – Chestertown, Sassafras, Cecilton	Northern terminus of MD 313A
1.000 mi = 1.609 km; 1.000 km = 0.621 mi: Concurrency terminus
