= November 2020 North American storm complex =

Weather event in North America

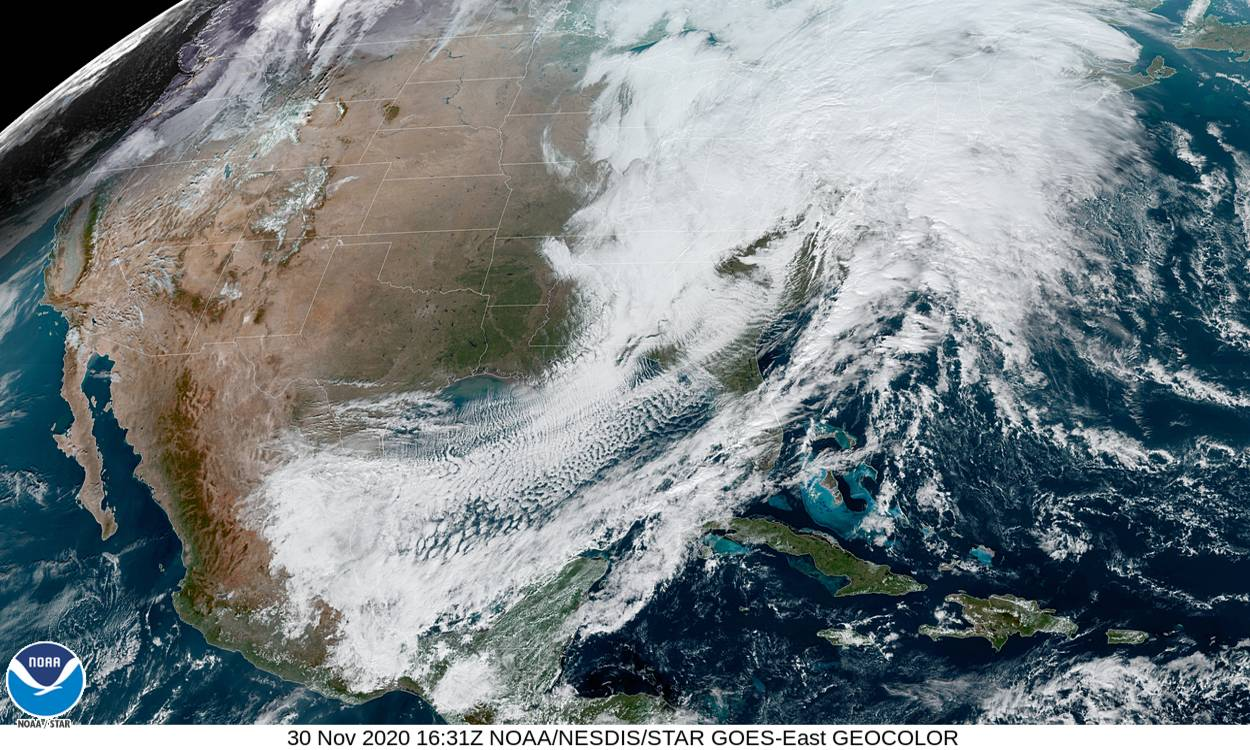
- GOES-16 satellite imagery of the storm complex impacting the Ohio Valley at 16:31 UTC (11:31 a.m. EDT) on November 30

Meteorological history
- Formed: November 29, 2020
- Dissipated: December 2, 2020

Winter storm
- Highest gusts: 130 km/h (80 mph)
- Lowest pressure: 993 hPa (mbar); 29.32 inHg
- Max. snowfall: 24 in (61 cm) at Thompson, Ohio

Tornado outbreak
- Tornadoes: 5
- Max. rating: EF1 tornado
- Duration: 12 hours, 43 minutes

Overall effects
- Fatalities: None confirmed
- Damage: >$100 million (2020 USD)
- Areas affected: Southern United States, Ohio Valley, Northeastern United States, Eastern Canada
- Power outages: >100,000
- Part of the 2020–21 North American winter and tornado outbreaks of 2020

The November 2020 North American storm complex was a major early-season snowstorm that impacted most of the Ohio Valley from November 30–December 2 with heavy snow, gusty winds, and near-whiteout conditions. The system originated from a weak gulf low off the coast of Texas on November 29, which began to move northeastward onto land the next day. It then began to strengthen, as well as slowing its movement down, resulting in heavy, wind-driven snow for prolonged periods of time in the Ohio Valley. It also triggered a major lake-effect snow event from December 1–2 as the system stalled over Lake Ontario, resulting in additional heavy snowfall. The storm system was also responsible for a severe thunderstorm outbreak in the Southeast and Mid-Atlantic regions, causing 22 severe thunderstorms and 5 tornadoes. In total, the system is estimated to have caused at least $100 million (2020 USD) in damages. It was unofficially named Winter Storm Dane by The Weather Channel.

== Meteorological history ==
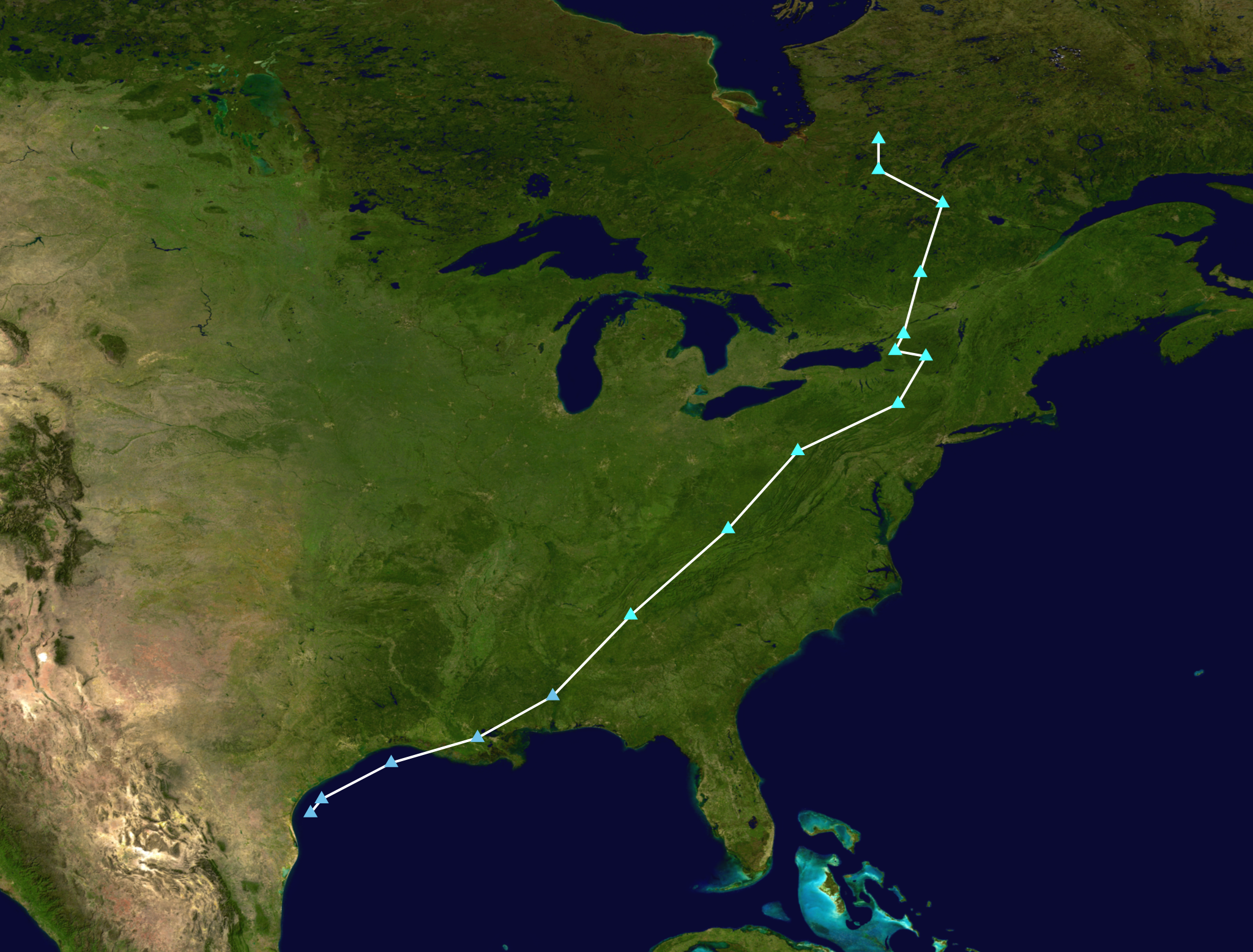
Map plotting the storm's track and intensity, according to the Saffir–Simpson scale Map key Saffir–Simpson scale Tropical depression (≤38 mph, ≤62 km/h) Tropical storm (39–73 mph, 63–118 km/h) Category 1 (74–95 mph, 119–153 km/h) Category 2 (96–110 mph, 154–177 km/h) Category 3 (111–129 mph, 178–208 km/h) Category 4 (130–156 mph, 209–251 km/h) Category 5 (≥157 mph, ≥252 km/h) Unknown Storm type Tropical cyclone Subtropical cyclone Extratropical cyclone, remnant low, tropical disturbance, or monsoon depression

The system formed as a weak low-pressure system off the coast of southeastern Texas early on November 29. After meandering eastward for around 12 hours, the low-pressure made landfall and came ashore in southeastern Louisiana at 18:00 UTC. It then turned northeastward, beginning to strengthen and spawning a secondary low-pressure to the east. By 15:00 UTC on November 30, the system had spawned two more low-pressures, and the main low had reached an initial intensity of 995 millibars (29.4 inHg). The system reached a peak intensity of 993 millibars (29.3 inHg) at 00:00 UTC on December 1, while two of the low-pressure areas dissipated and the main low stalled out over Lake Ontario. Another low-pressure dissipated a few hours later, leaving only the main low remaining, which began to slowly weaken. The system continued weakening throughout December 1, and by early on December 2, it had begun moving to the northeast again. After continuing to weaken for several hours, it dissipated late on December 2.

== Preparations and impact ==
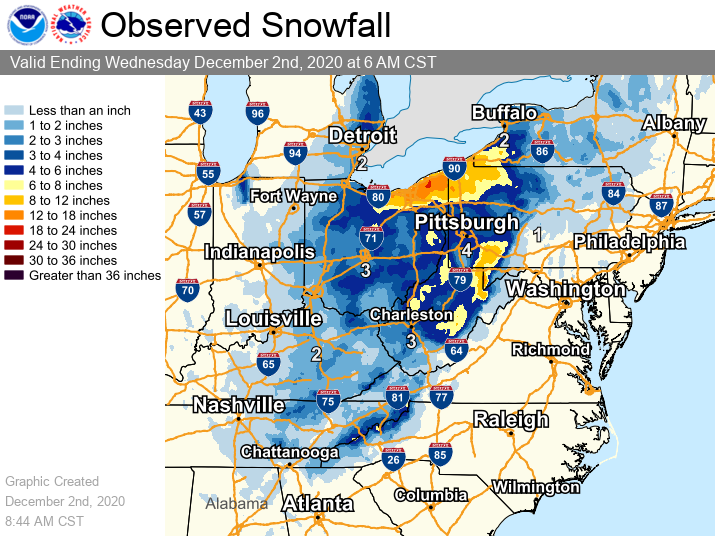
A map of observed snowfall accumulation reports in the Ohio Valley and Appalachians from the storm

Winter Storm Warnings were issued in parts of Ohio and Pennsylvania, mainly along the shores of Lake Erie due to the potential for heavy snow. Winter Weather Advisories were issued in a broad swath farther south, stretching all the way down to eastern Tennessee.

=== Ohio Valley ===
A fairly large area of Ohio and Pennsylvania picked up over 10 inches (25 cm) of snow, with the highest totals near Lake Erie. Snow fell in Cleveland all day November 30, and the city saw 10.1 inches (26 cm) of snow during the event. Areas near Cleveland, such as Thompson, Ohio, saw as much as 24 inches (61 cm) of snow, due to lake-effect enhancement. Trees and power lines were downed in the Cleveland area due to the heavy snow and strong winds. Elnora, Indiana had received nearly 7 inches (18 cm) by the time snow had ended. Detroit, Pittsburgh, Columbus, and other areas further away from Lake Erie generally saw 1–4 inches (2.5–10.2 cm) of snow from the system.

=== Southern Appalachians ===
In Arab, Alabama, 1 inch (2.5 cm) of snow was measured. Around 0.5 inches (1.3 cm) of snow was reported in the Murfreesboro, Tennessee area. The Gatlinburg and Pigeon Forge areas had seen up to 5 inches (13 cm). By the end of the night, Mount Le Conte, Tennessee had seen 11 inches (28 cm) inches of snow, as reported by the National Weather Service. Roan Mountain, Tennessee had seen 12 inches (30 cm) by the time snow and finished, and Robbinsville, North Carolina picked up a total of 15 inches (38 cm) from the system.

=== Northeast ===
On November 30, the Verrazzano–Narrows Bridge closed all lanes due to high wind conditions. The bridge shaking resulted in viral social media videos. In Massachusetts, wind gusts at Blue Hill Observatory reached 81 mph (130 km/h).

== Severe weather ==
The warm side of the system also resulted in some severe thunderstorms in the Southeast and Mid-Atlantic regions. Several of the storms became tornadic, with at least five tornadoes being confirmed on November 30. The storms also resulted in 22 reports of wind damage in an area from Maryland to eastern Pennsylvania.

Confirmed tornadoes by Enhanced Fujita rating
EFU	EF0	EF1	EF2	EF3	EF4	EF5	Total
1	2	2	0	0	0	0	5

=== Confirmed tornadoes ===
List of confirmed tornadoes – Monday, November 30, 2020 (Note: All dates are based on the local time zone where the tornado touched down; however, all times are in Coordinated Universal Time for consistency.)
EF#	Location	County / Parish	State	Start Coord.	Time (UTC)	Path length	Max width
EF1	NNW of Hamburg to SE of Nankin	Madison	FL	30.5923°N 83.5222°W	08:10–08:18	5.52 mi (8.88 km)	475 yd (434 m)
EF1	Significant tree damage and minor damage to a home occurred near where this tornado touched down. The tornado was at its strongest and its widest point as it continued to significantly damage trees, and cause damage to multiple farm outbuildings. As the tornado narrowed, it snapped many pine trees. The tornado lifted near SR 53, just south of the Florida/Georgia state border.						
EFU	East Lake to NE of Odessa	Pinellas, Hillsborough, Pasco	FL	28.1°N 82.69°W	11:00–11:25	12.45 mi (20.04 km)	50 yd (46 m)
EFU	Despite this tornado touching down intermittently for over 12 mi (19 km), only damage reported was downed tree limbs and blown around patio furniture.						
EF1	E of Port Deposit to Woodlawn	Cecil	MD	39.644°N 76.063°W	19:37–19:42	3.36 mi (5.41 km)	75 yd (69 m)
EF1	Many trees were snapped or uprooted at the beginning of the path, including some near a home. As the tornado moved northeast, it damaged newly installed power poles near another home. Additional trees and power poles were damaged. The tornado was at its strongest point when a front porch awning was lifted. Damage to other homes occurred, including damage to roof shingles and siding. One home's garage door was bent inward. Trees were snapped or uprooted along the rest of the path before the tornado lifted.						
EF0	NNW of Baltimore Corner to SW of Templeville	Caroline	MD	39.0675°N 75.8520°W	20:13–20:20	5.32 mi (8.56 km)	75 yd (69 m)
EF0	This tornado first touched down along MD 313, just south of the Caroline/Queen Anne's county border. Little to no damage was found in this area, however, a small tornado debris signature appeared on doppler radar. As this tornado moved northeastward, it passed northwest of Henderson. In this area, a small horse barn was destroyed, with its walls collapsed, and its roof blown across a yard into a nearby home. The nearby home had damage done to its roof, siding, and chimney. Several trees and tree branches were snapped or uprooted. Later on down the path, two barns were destroyed. One of the barns' roofs was lifted and tossed, while the other was peeled and twisted. The tornado continued northeast before lifting.						
EF0	Montgomeryville	Montgomery	PA	40.23°N 75.24°W	20:52–20:53	0.87 mi (1.40 km)	100 yd (91 m)
EF0	A brief tornado touched down just east of the PA 309 northbound onramp to the US 202 parkway. As the tornado crossed the US 202 parkway, two small trees were uprooted. Wooden picnic tables outside of a Texas Roadhouse were tossed, shattering the front window of a nearby closed restaurant. This same restaurant had air-handling equipment and siding torn from the building. Six to eight cars in the parking lots of both the Texas Roadhouse and the nearby restaurant were either shaken or tossed by the tornado. Several small tree branches were snapped in the area. Metal light posts were bent at the base, and two stop signs were either bent over or removed from the ground. A supporting pole at the entrance of a nearby Staybridge Suites was damaged. The tornado inflicted minor damage to roofing at a Costco before lifting less than one minute after it touched down.						

== See also ==
- April 2016 North American storm complex
- Tornado outbreak and floods of April 28 – May 1, 2017
- Tornado outbreak and blizzard of April 13–15, 2018
