= Maryland Route 454 =

State highway in Maryland, United States

Maryland Route 454
- Maryland Route 454 highlighted in red

Route information
- Maintained by MDSHA
- Length: 2.21 mi (3.56 km)
- Existed: 1927–present

Major junctions
- South end: DE 8 in Marydel
- MD 311 in Marydel
- North end: MD 302 in Templeville

Location
- Country: United States
- State: Maryland
- Counties: Caroline

Highway system
- Maryland highway system; Interstate; US; State; Scenic Byways
← MD 452	→ MD 456

Maryland Route 454 (MD 454) is a state highway in the U.S. state of Maryland. Known for most of its length as Crown Stone Road, the state highway runs 2.21 miles (3.56 km) from the Delaware state line in Marydel, where the highway continues east as Delaware Route 8 (DE 8), north to MD 302 in Templeville. MD 454 was built in the late 1910s. The state highway originally ended in Marydel at MD 311, which crossed the state line. MD 454 replaced MD 311 along the stretch to the state line around 1946 and bypassed Marydel by 1956.

== Route description ==
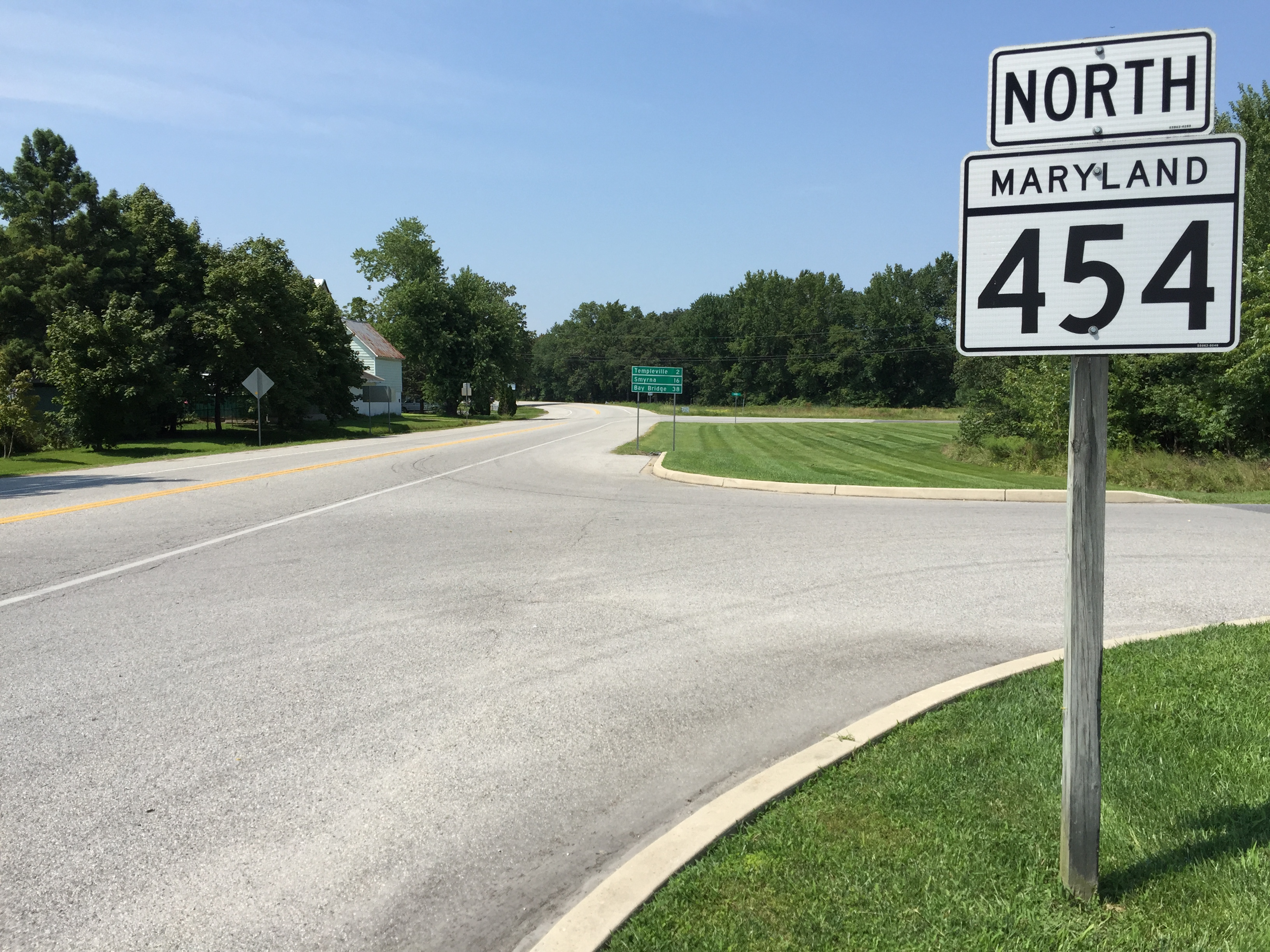
View north along MD 454 at MD 311 in Marydel

MD 454 begins at the Delaware state line in the town of Marydel in Caroline County, adjacent to a five-mile (8 km) Mason–Dixon marker that gives the highway its name. The highway continues east as DE 8 (Halltown Road) toward Dover. The state highway, known as Halltown Road, heads northwest as a two-lane undivided road. The route immediately encounters the eastern end of MD 821 (Main Street) and crosses an unused railroad grade owned by the Maryland Department of Transportation. MD 454 meets the northern terminus of MD 311 (Halltown Road), where the name changes to Crown Stone Road, before leaving Marydel and collecting the other end of MD 821. The state highway turns north through farmland before entering the town of Templeville and terminating at MD 302 (Barclay Road), which forms the border between Caroline County and Queen Anne's County.

== History ==
MD 454 was paved as a state-aid road from Marydel to Templeville between 1915 and 1921. The state highway originally had its southern terminus in Marydel at MD 311. It was MD 311 that continued to the state line until 1946. MD 454 was moved off of Main Street and onto a new alignment through Marydel by 1956.

== Junction list ==
The entire route is in Caroline County.

Location	mi	km	Destinations	Notes
Marydel	0.00	0.00	DE 8 east (Halltown Road) – Dover	Delaware state line; southern terminus
Marydel	0.03	0.048	MD 821 west (Main Street)	Eastern terminus of MD 821; MD 821 is unsigned
Marydel	0.11	0.18	MD 311 south (Halltown Road) – Henderson, Goldsboro, Denton	Northern terminus of MD 311
Marydel	0.36	0.58	MD 821 east (Main Street)	Western terminus of MD 821; MD 821 is unsigned
Templeville	2.21	3.56	MD 302 (Barclay Road) to US 301 – Barclay, Bay Bridge, Smyrna	Northern terminus
1.000 mi = 1.609 km; 1.000 km = 0.621 mi
