= Maryland Route 302 =

State highway in Maryland, United States

Maryland Route 302
- Maryland Route 302 highlighted in red

Route information
- Maintained by MDSHA
- Length: 10.21 mi (16.43 km)
- Existed: 1927–present

Major junctions
- West end: US 301 near Barclay
- MD 313 in Barclay; MD 454 in Templeville
- East end: DE 11 at the Delaware state line near Templeville

Location
- Country: United States
- State: Maryland
- Counties: Queen Anne's, Caroline

Highway system
- Maryland highway system; Interstate; US; State; Scenic Byways
← US 301	→ MD 303

Maryland Route 302 (MD 302) is a state highway in the U.S. state of Maryland. Known for most of its length as Barclay Road, the state highway runs 10.21 miles (16.43 km) from U.S. Route 301 (US 301) near Barclay east to the Delaware state line near Templeville, where the highway continues northeast as Delaware Route 11 (DE 11). MD 302 follows the Queen Anne's–Caroline county line for part of its length near Templeville. The county line road is considered to be in Caroline County for maintenance purposes. MD 302 was first paved in Barclay in the early 1920s and from Templeville to the state line in the late 1920s. The gap between Barclay and Templeville was filled in the late 1930s. MD 302 was extended west toward Church Hill in the late 1940s and to US 301 in the mid-1960s.

== Route description ==
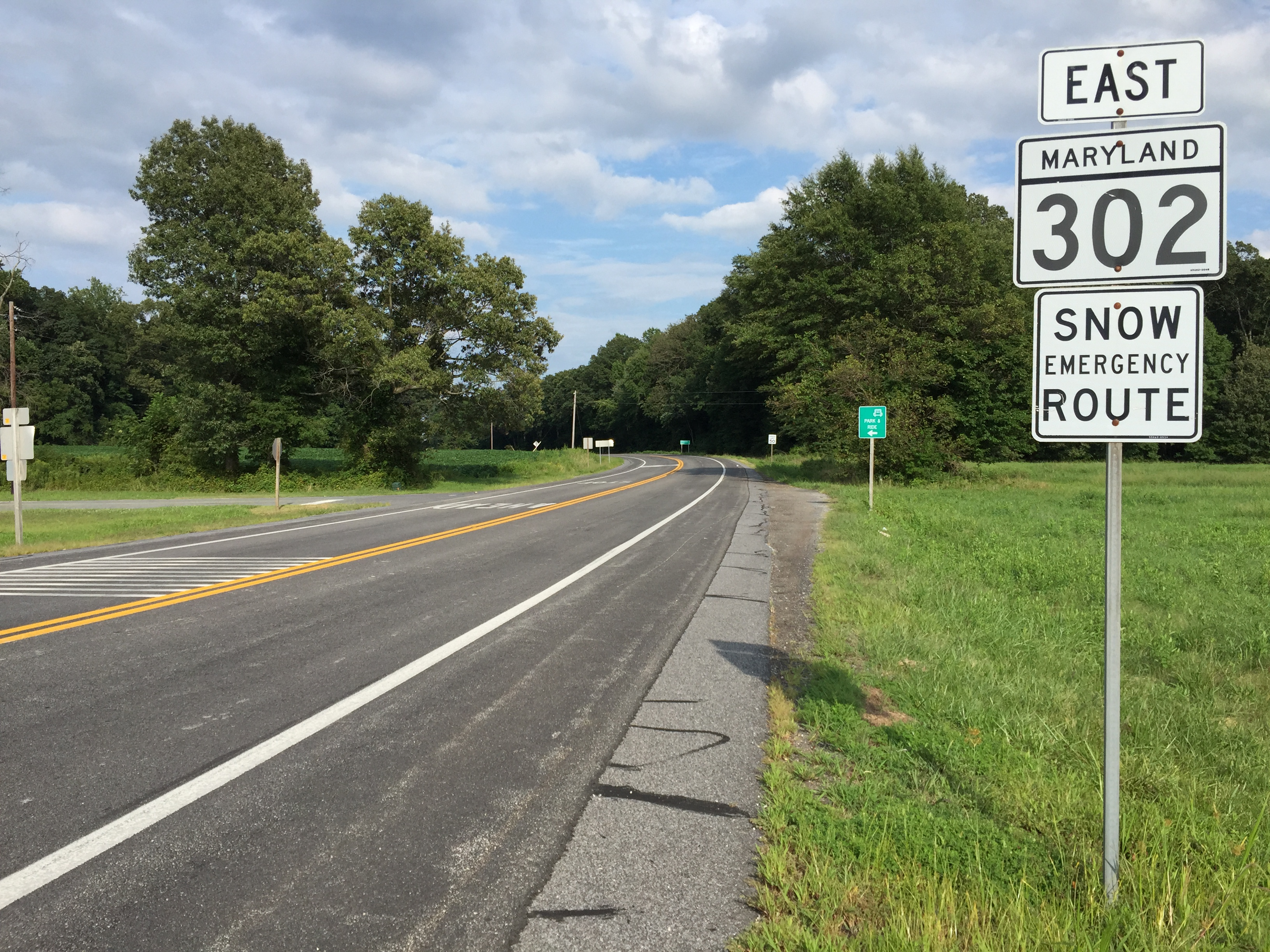
View east along MD 302 at US 301 in Queen Anne's County

MD 302 begins at an intersection with US 301 (Blue Star Memorial Highway) about midway between Church Hill and Barclay in Queen Anne's County. County-maintained Hall Road heads west from the intersection toward Church Hill, and a park and ride lot is located in the northeast quadrant of the intersection. MD 302 heads east as two-lane undivided Barclay Road, which crosses Red Lion Branch near its source west of Stevens Corners. The highway passes through the town of Barclay as Church Street. In the center of town, the highway has a grade crossing with the Centreville Branch of the Northern Line of the Maryland and Delaware Railroad just west of the route's junction with MD 313 (Goldsboro Road). Upon leaving Barclay, the route becomes Barclay Road again. MD 302 crosses Unicorn Branch at its source, and the highway begins to follow the Queen Anne's–Caroline county line at its intersection with Woodyard Road. MD 302 passes through the town of Templeville, where the highway intersects the northern terminus of MD 454 (Crown Stone Road). East of the town, shortly after crossing Beaver Dam Ditch, MD 302 reaches its eastern terminus at the Delaware state line. The highway continues northeast as DE 11 (Arthursville Road) toward the town of Hartly.

== History ==
The first section of MD 302 was about 1 mile (1.6 km) east from MD 313 in Barclay paved in 1923. A second, unconnected section was completed between Templeville and the Delaware state line in 1930. The gap between Barclay and Templeville was filled in 1939. MD 302 was extended west about 2 miles (3.2 km) toward Church Hill in 1949. The state highway reached its present length when it was extended to US 301 in 1966.

== Junction list ==
MD 302 follows the Queen Anne's–Caroline county line from just west of Woodyard Road near Templeville to the Delaware state line. The county line portion is considered to be in Caroline County for maintenance purposes.

County	Location	mi	km	Destinations	Notes
Queen Anne's		0.00	0.00	US 301 (Blue Star Memorial Highway) / Hall Road west – Bay Bridge, Wilmington	Western terminus
Queen Anne's	Barclay	3.48	5.60	MD 313 (Goldsboro Road) – Sudlersville, Goldsboro	
Queen Anne's–Caroline county line	Templeville	9.10	14.65	MD 454 south (Crown Stone Road) – Marydel, Dover	Northern terminus of MD 454
Queen Anne's–Caroline county line	Templeville	10.21	16.43	DE 11 north (Arthursville Road) – Hartly	Delaware state line; eastern terminus
1.000 mi = 1.609 km; 1.000 km = 0.621 mi
