= Maryland Route 287 =

State highway in Maryland, United States

Maryland Route 287
- Maryland Route 287 highlighted in red

Route information
- Maintained by MDSHA
- Length: 2.88 mi (4.63 km)
- Existed: 1933–present
- Tourist routes: Harriet Tubman Underground Railroad Byway

Major junctions
- West end: MD 313 in Goldsboro
- MD 311 in Goldsboro
- East end: DE 10 near Goldsboro

Location
- Country: United States
- State: Maryland
- Counties: Caroline

Highway system
- Maryland highway system; Interstate; US; State; Scenic Byways
← MD 286	→ MD 288

Maryland Route 287 (MD 287) is a state highway in Caroline County in the U.S. state of Maryland. Known for much of its length as Sandtown Road, the state highway runs 2.88 miles (4.63 km) from MD 313 in Goldsboro east to the Delaware state line, where the highway continues east as Delaware Route 10 (DE 10). MD 287 was constructed in the early 1930s.

== Route description ==
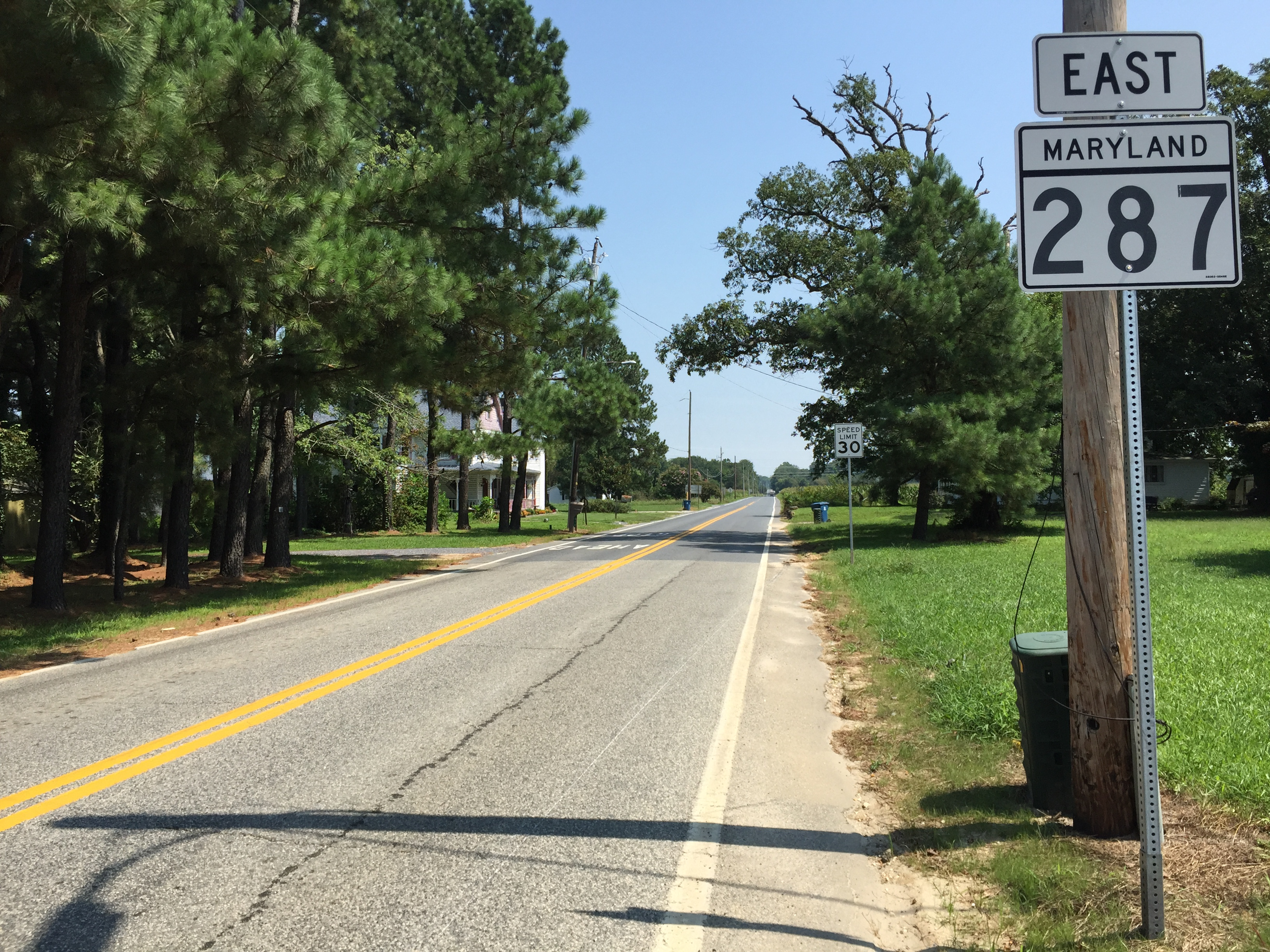
View east along MD 287 at MD 311 in Goldsboro

MD 287 begins at an intersection with MD 313 on the northwest edge of the town of Goldsboro. MD 313 heads south into the town as Oldtown Road and west as Goldsboro Road. MD 287 heads east as two-lane undivided Old Line Road along the northern edge of Goldsboro. After intersecting MD 311 (Main Street) and crossing an unused railroad grade owned by the Maryland Department of Transportation, the state highway's name changes to Sandtown Road and it leaves Goldsboro as it heads east through farmland, crossing Broadway Branch and the upper part of the Choptank River. MD 287 reaches its eastern terminus at the Delaware state line, where the road continues east as DE 10 (Willow Grove Road) toward the town of Camden.

== History ==
MD 287 was constructed starting in 1930 and completed by 1933.

== Junction list ==
The entire route is in Caroline County.

Location	mi	km	Destinations	Notes
Goldsboro	0.00	0.00	MD 313 (Goldsboro Road/Oldtown Road) – Ingleside, Bay Bridge	Western terminus
Goldsboro	0.29	0.47	MD 311 (Main Street) to MD 313 south – Henderson, Marydel	
	2.88	4.63	DE 10 east (Willow Grove Road) – Camden	Delaware state line; eastern terminus
1.000 mi = 1.609 km; 1.000 km = 0.621 mi
