= Castle Hall =

Castle Hall may refer to:

- Castle Hall School and Specialist Language College, located in Mirfield, United Kingdom.
- Osaka-jō Hall, or Osaka Castle Hall
- Castle Hall (Goldsboro, Maryland), listed on the NRHP in Maryland
