= Marydel =

Marydel is the name of two places in the United States of America (acquiring their names by being on the Maryland-Delaware border):

- Marydel, Delaware
- Marydel, Maryland
