= Maryland Route 311 =

State highway in Maryland, United States

Maryland Route 311
- Maryland Route 311 highlighted in red

Route information
- Maintained by MDSHA
- Length: 6.11 mi (9.83 km)
- Existed: 1927–present
- Tourist routes: Harriet Tubman Underground Railroad Byway

Major junctions
- South end: MD 313 in Goldsboro
- MD 287 in Goldsboro
- North end: MD 454 in Marydel

Location
- Country: United States
- State: Maryland
- Counties: Caroline

Highway system
- Maryland highway system; Interstate; US; State; Scenic Byways
| ← MD 310 | → MD 312 |

Maryland Route 311 (MD 311) is a state highway in the U.S. state of Maryland. Known for most of its length as Henderson Road, the state highway runs 6.11 miles (9.83 km) from MD 313 in Goldsboro north to MD 454 in Marydel in Caroline County. MD 311 was constructed in the mid-1920s. The state highway originally continued through Marydel to the Delaware state line, but was rolled back in favor of MD 454 in the mid-1940s.

== Route description ==
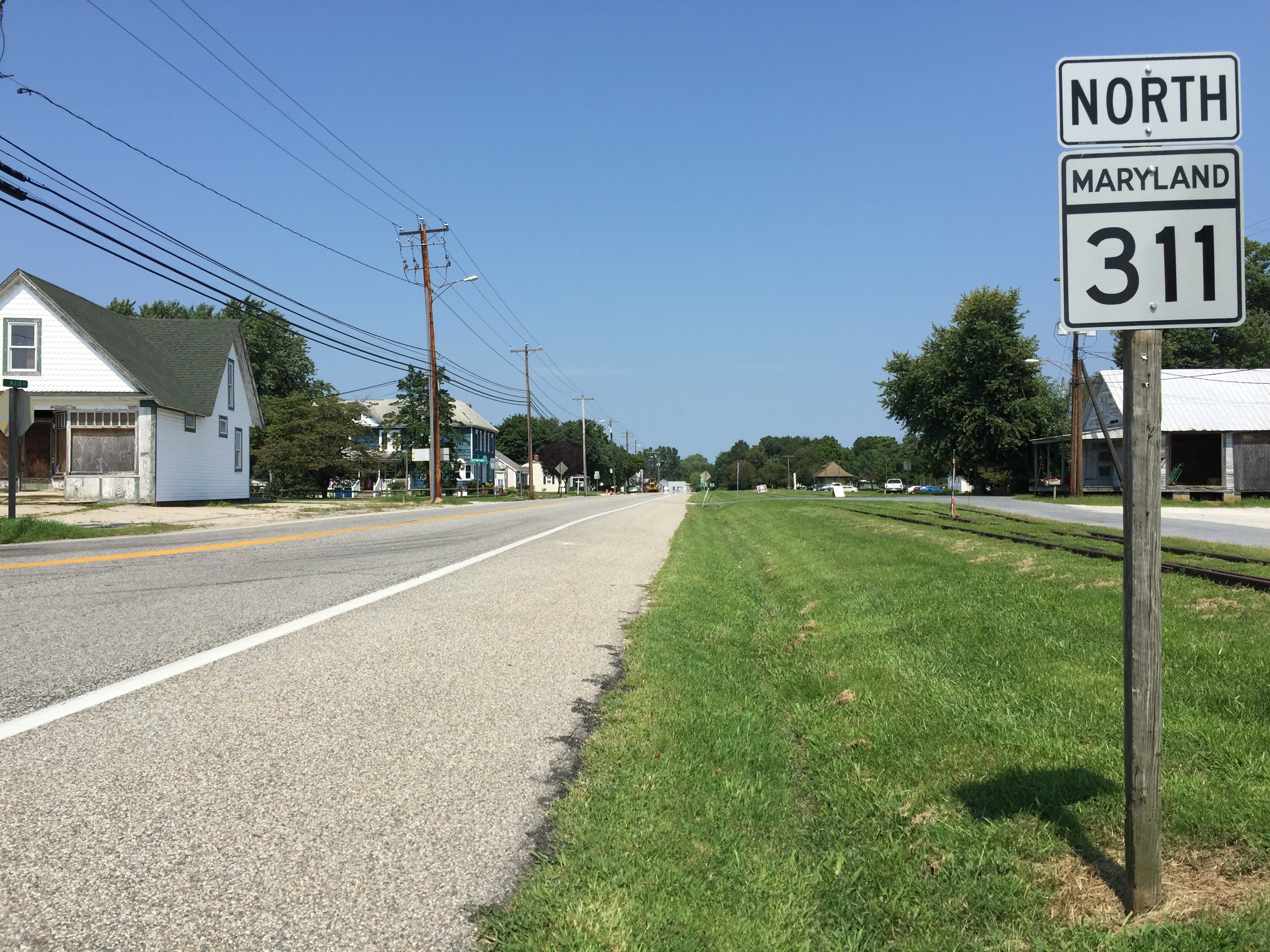
View north along MD 311 at MD 313 in Goldsboro

MD 311 begins at a junction with MD 313 (Oldtown Road) in the town of Goldsboro. The state highway, named Main Street, heads north as a two-lane undivided road, closely paralleling an unused rail line whose right-of-way is owned by the Maryland Department of Transportation that is situated east of the road. After intersecting MD 287 (Sandtown Road), MD 311 leaves the town of Goldsboro and the vicinity of the rail line, with the highway's name changing to Henderson Road. The state highway crosses Broadway Branch before rejoining the rail line immediately before the intersection with River Bridge Road, where the highway enters the town of Henderson. After leaving Henderson, MD 311 veers away from the rail line and crosses Cold Spring Branch. The state highway passes through a mix of farms and forests as it approaches the town of Marydel. Within the town, the state highway becomes Halltown Road and intersects Main Street, which is unsigned MD 821, shortly before reaching its northern terminus at MD 454 (Crown Stone Road/Halltown Road).

== History ==
MD 311 was constructed in its modern form in 1924. At the time, the state highway turned east onto Main Street in Marydel and followed it to the Delaware state line. By 1946, MD 311's northern terminus was rolled back to Main Street and MD 454 headed to the state line instead. MD 311 was widened along its entire length in 1952. The state highway was extended a short distance to its present northern terminus when MD 454 was transferred to a new alignment in Marydel in 1956.

== Junction list ==
The entire route is in Caroline County.

| Location | mi | km | Destinations | Notes |
|---|---|---|---|---|
| Goldsboro | 0.00 | 0.00 | MD 313 (Oldtown Road) – Greensboro, Denton | Southern terminus |
| Goldsboro | 0.27 | 0.43 | MD 287 (Sandtown Road) to MD 313 north – Camden, DE, Ingleside | |
| Marydel | 6.06 | 9.75 | MD 821 (Main Street) | MD 821 is unsigned |
| Marydel | 6.11 | 9.83 | MD 454 (Crown Stone Road/Halltown Road) – Bay Bridge, Smyrna, Templeville, Dover | Northern terminus |
1.000 mi = 1.609 km; 1.000 km = 0.621 mi
