= Maryland Route 577 =

State highway in Maryland, United States

Maryland Route 577
- Reliance Road
- Maryland Route 577 highlighted in red

Route information
- Maintained by MDSHA
- Length: 3.70 mi (5.95 km)
- Existed: 1935–present

Major junctions
- South end: MD 392 at Reliance
- North end: MD 313 near Federalsburg

Location
- Country: United States
- State: Maryland
- Counties: Caroline, Dorchester

Highway system
- Maryland highway system; Interstate; US; State; Scenic Byways
← MD 575	→ MD 578

Maryland Route 577 (MD 577) is a state highway in the U.S. state of Maryland. Known as Reliance Road, the state highway runs 3.70 miles (5.95 km) from MD 392 at Reliance north to MD 313 near Federalsburg. MD 577 follows the Dorchester–Caroline county line for its entire length. The state highway is considered to be in Caroline County for maintenance purposes. The first section of MD 577 was paved near its northern terminus by 1910 and reconstructed as a state highway in 1935. The highway was completed south to Reliance in 1942.

== Route description ==
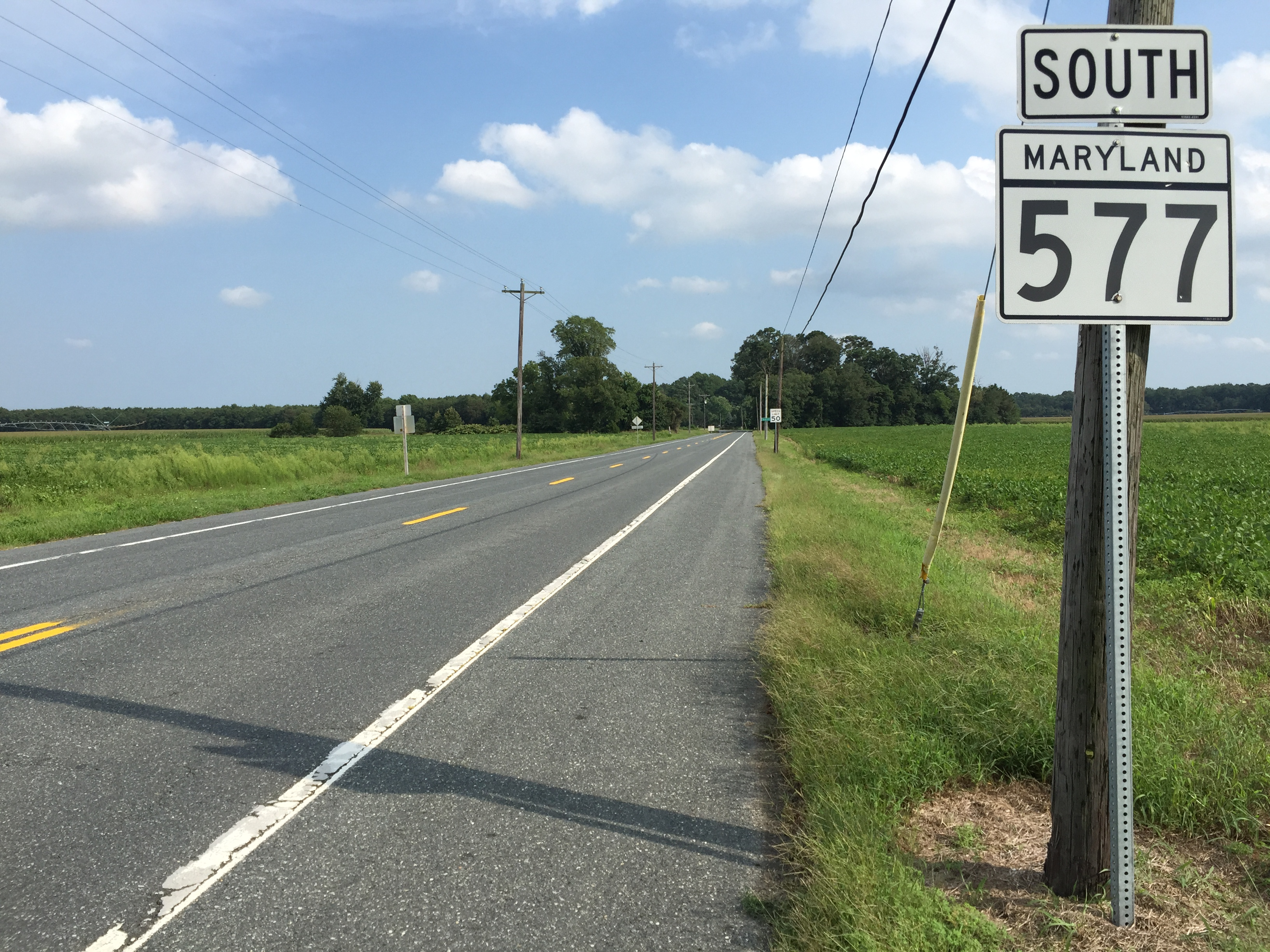
View south along MD 577 at MD 313 near Federalsburg

MD 577 begins at an intersection with MD 392 (Finchville–Reliance Road) 0.03 miles (0.048 km) west of the Delaware state line. The state highway heads northwest as a two-lane undivided road along the Caroline–Dorchester county line, passing through farmland. MD 577 reaches its northern terminus at an intersection with MD 313 south of Federalsburg. Reliance Road continues north toward Federalsburg as MD 313, while southbound MD 313 follows Eldorado Road into Dorchester County.

== History ==
The section of MD 577 for 1 mile (1.6 km) south of the MD 313 junction was paved by 1910. That portion was repaved in 1935 as a state highway. The remainder of MD 577 south to Reliance was completed in 1942.

== Junction list ==
MD 577 follows the Caroline–Dorchester county line for its entire length. The state highway is considered to be in Caroline County for maintenance purposes.

Location	mi	km	Destinations	Notes
Reliance	0.00	0.00	MD 392 (Finchville–Reliance Road) – Seaford, Hurlock	Southern terminus
Federalsburg	3.70	5.95	MD 313 (Reliance Road/Eldorado Road) – Federalsburg, Eldorado	Northern terminus
1.000 mi = 1.609 km; 1.000 km = 0.621 mi
