= Willin Village Archeological Site =

- U.S. National Register of Historic Places
- Nearest city: Eldorado, Maryland
- NRHP reference No.: 75000890
- Added to NRHP: May 12, 1975

Willin Village Archeological Site is an archaeological site near Eldorado in Dorchester County, Maryland. The Sussex Society of Archeology and History extensively excavated this site between 1951 and 1953. They identified grooved axes and stemmed points indicating use by Archaic peoples. It was possibly the site of a village during the Late Woodland period.

It was listed on the National Register of Historic Places in 1975.
