= Rehoboth (Eldorado, Maryland) =

Historic house in Maryland, USA

- U.S. National Register of Historic Places
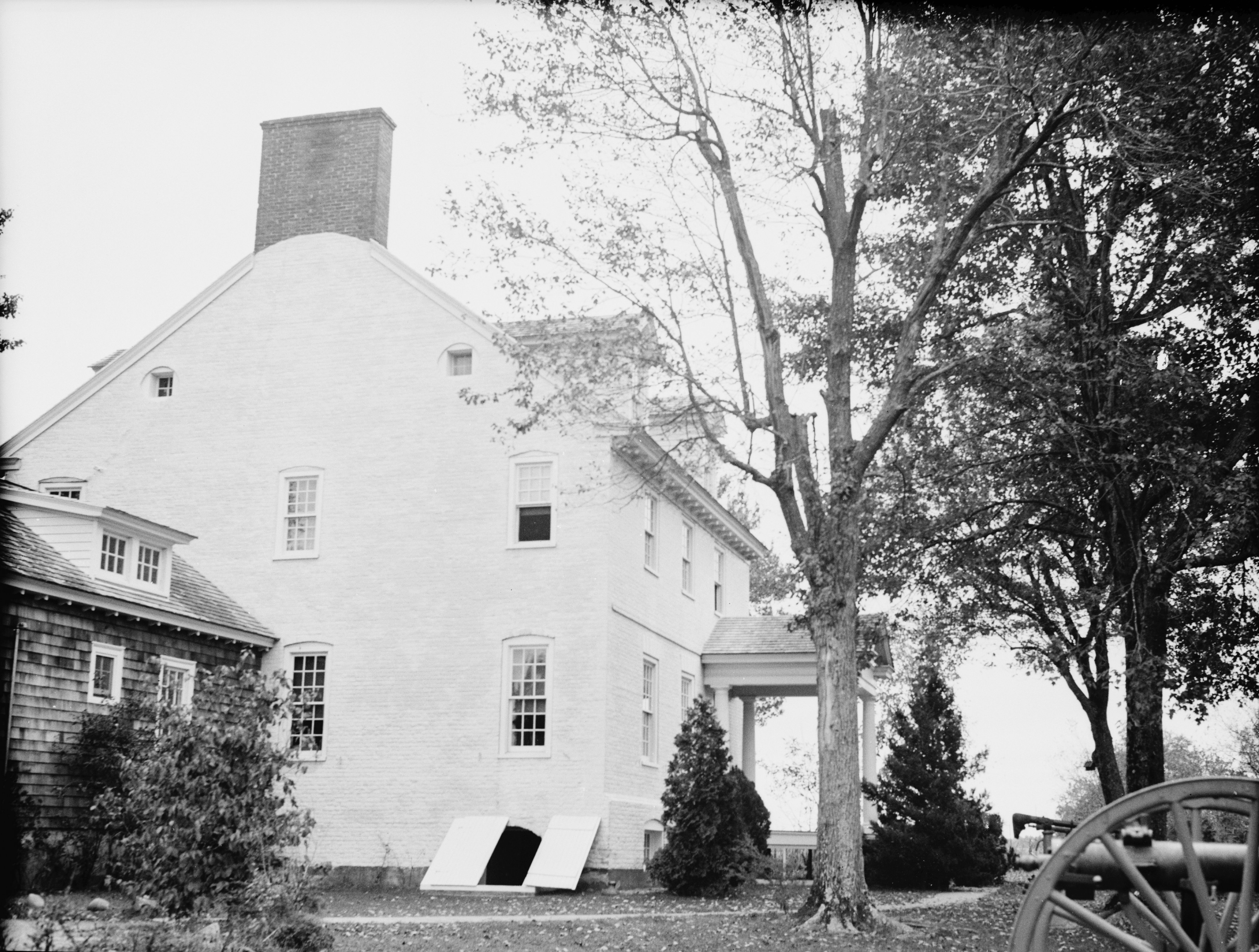
- Rehoboth, HABS Photo, 1933

- Location within Maryland Location within the United States
- Location: W side of Punkum Rd., Eldorado, Maryland
- Coordinates: 38°35′14″N 75°47′48″W
- Area: 16 acres (6.5 ha)
- Built: 1783
- NRHP reference No.: 72000577
- Added to NRHP: November 9, 1972

Rehoboth, also known as Turpin Place or Lee Mansion, is a historic home located at Eldorado, Dorchester County, Maryland, United States. It is a 2 1/2-story Flemish bond brick house. A chimney rises flush with the one gable end, and a 1 1/2-story frame kitchen wing is attached to the other end. The interior of the house was gutted by fire in October 1916, and rebuilt. It was the family home of the second elected Governor of Maryland, Thomas Sim Lee.

Rehoboth was listed on the National Register of Historic Places in 1972.
