= Athol (Henderson, Maryland) =

Historic house in Maryland

- U.S. National Register of Historic Places
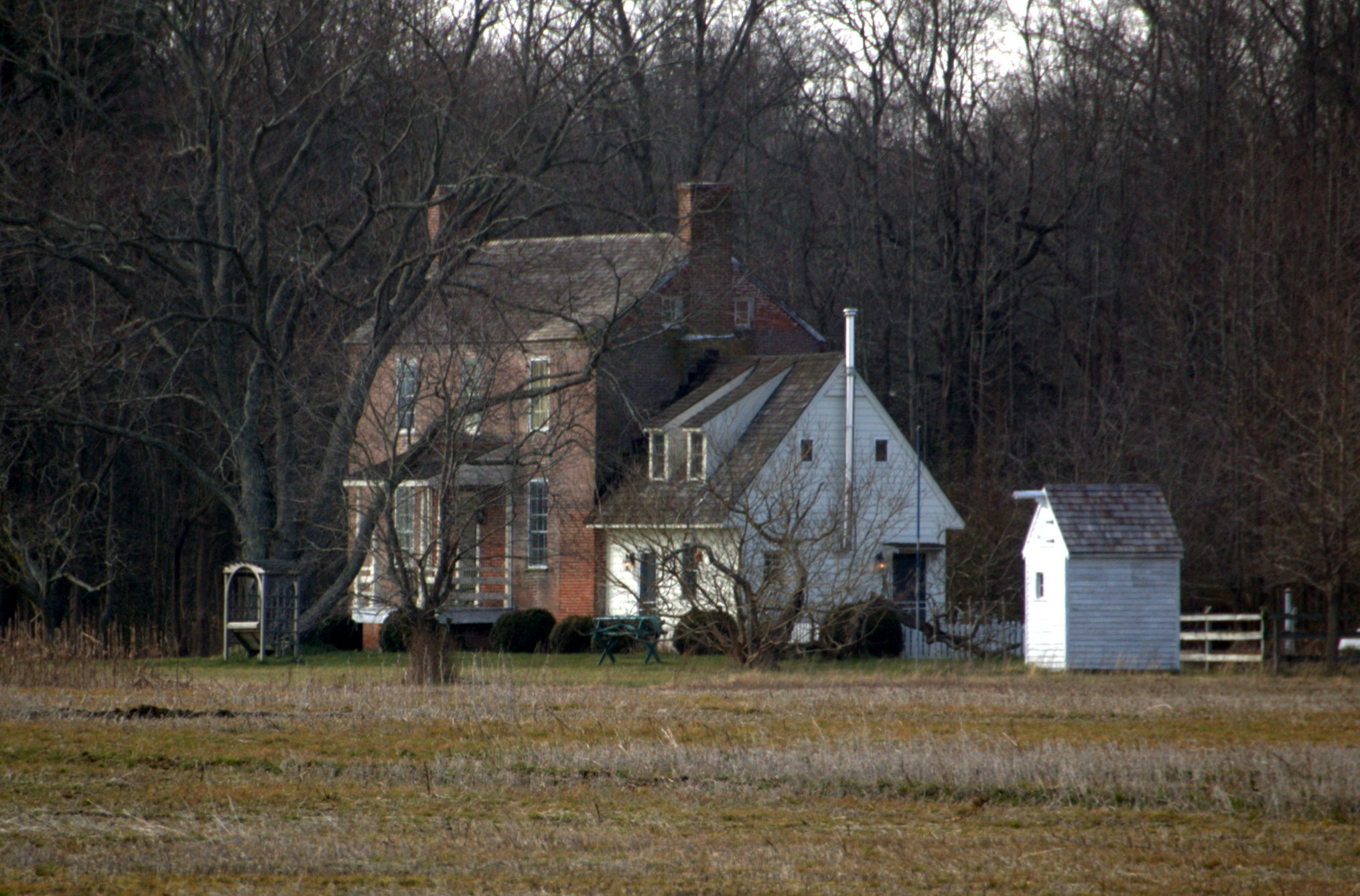

- Location within Maryland Location within the United States
- Nearest city: Melville Rd. near Trunk Line Rd., Henderson, Maryland
- Coordinates: 39°5′15″N 75°47′41″W
- Area: 2 acres (0.81 ha)
- Built: 1825
- Architectural style: Federal
- NRHP reference No.: 89000485
- Added to NRHP: June 9, 1989

Athol is a historic home located at Henderson, Caroline County, Maryland. It is a 2 1/2-story single-pile brick dwelling built around 1825 by William Jones. It has several characteristics common to the few remaining early-19th-century brick three-bay-wide houses of modest size on the Eastern Shore of Maryland: Flemish bond facade, common bond on the sides and rear, chimneys at each end of a gable roof, and Federal stylistic influence.

It was listed on the National Register of Historic Places in 1989.
