= William J. Winchester =

American politician

Member of the Delaware House of Representatives from the 1st district
- In office 1948–1952

Wilmington City Council

Personal details
- Born: 1875 or 1876 Barclay, Maryland, U.S.
- Died: January 3, 1952 (aged 76) Wilmington, Delaware, U.S.
- Party: Republican
- Spouse: Alverta Winchester
- Children: Lem Winchester
- Profession: Politician

William J. Winchester (c. 1876 – January 3, 1952) was a city councilor and state legislator in Delaware. He served from 1948 until 1952 and was the first African American in the Delaware House of Representatives. A historical marker the state capital, Wilmington, Delaware, commemorates him and other of the state's pioneering African American legislators.

== Life before politics ==
William J. Winchester was born in Barclay, Maryland around 1876. In 1888, he moved to Wilmington, Delaware.

He married a woman named Alverta. They had one child, vibraphonist Lem Winchester. Winchester served as grand master of a local Odd Fellows lodge.

== Political career and life ==
He was a Republican. Winchester served on the Wilmington City Council for sixteen years, leaving the council in 1941.

He ran for the Delaware House of Representatives in 1944 and was defeated. He was elected in 1948, making him the first Black man elected to the Delaware House of Representatives. He was re-elected in 1950.

While serving in the house, Winchester worked as superintendent for Wilmington's garbage collection. In June 1949, Winchester was awarded an honorary doctor of law from Delaware State College.

== Death ==
Winchester became sick in late 1951, missing numerous legislative sessions. He died of cerebral thrombosis at his house in Wilmington on January 3, 1952, while serving his second term in office.

At the time of his death, he was a member of the Odd Fellows and Elks. He was also a trustee and the treasurer of Mount Joy Methodist Church and a trustee of Morgan State University.

== Legacy ==
In 1979, a bridge in Wilmington over the Christina River at Third Street was named in his honor.

== See also ==
- List of African-American officeholders (1900–1959)
