= Reliance, Delaware and Maryland =

Unincorporated community in Delaware, United States and Maryland, United States

Reliance, Delaware
- Unincorporated community
- Location within Delaware Location within Maryland Location within the United States
- Coordinates: 38°38′07″N 75°42′23″W
- Country: United States
- State: Delaware, Maryland
- County: Sussex (DE), Caroline (MD), Dorchester (MD)
- Elevation: 43 ft (13 m)
- Time zone: UTC-5 (Eastern (EST))
  - Summer (DST): UTC-4 (EDT)
- Area codes: 302, 410, 443, and 667
- GNIS feature ID: 214538

Reliance is an unincorporated community located on the border of the U.S. states of Maryland and Delaware. The Maryland side of the community has portions in Caroline and Dorchester counties, while the Delaware side is located within Sussex County. Reliance is along Delaware Route 20 and Maryland Route 392 at the junction with Maryland Route 577, west of Seaford. It was previously known as Johnson's Crossroads.

== Notable person ==
Patty Cannon (c. 1760 or 1759 or 1769 – May 11, 1829) was an illegal slave trader and the co-leader of the Cannon-Johnson Gang of Maryland-Delaware, which operated for about a decade in the early 19th century kidnapping free blacks and refugee slaves to sell into slavery in the South, which came to be known as the Reverse Underground Railroad.
