= Barclay, Maryland =

- Town
- Flag Seal

- Location of Barclay, Maryland
- Coordinates: 39°8′41″N 75°51′53″W
- Country: United States
- State: Maryland
- County: Queen Anne's
- Incorporated: 1931

Area
  - Total: 0.39 sq mi (1.02 km^{2})
  - Land: 0.39 sq mi (1.02 km^{2})
  - Water: 0 sq mi (0.00 km^{2})
- Elevation: 69 ft (21 m)

Population (2020)
  - Total: 183
  - Density: 462.5/sq mi (178.57/km^{2})
- Time zone: UTC-5 (Eastern (EST))
  - Summer (DST): UTC-4 (EDT)
- ZIP code: 21607
- Area code: 410
- FIPS code: 24-04250
- GNIS feature ID: 0597048
- Website: Official Website

Barclay is a town in Queen Anne's County, Maryland, United States. As of the 2020 census, Barclay had a population of 183.

== Geography ==
Barclay is located at 39°8′41″N 75°51′53″W (39.144714, -75.864655).

According to the United States Census Bureau, the town has a total area of 0.16 square miles (0.41 km^{2}), all land.

== History ==
Barclay was founded in 1873 as Merrikton and renamed Barclay in 1890. The community was incorporated as the "Town of Barclay" in February 1931.

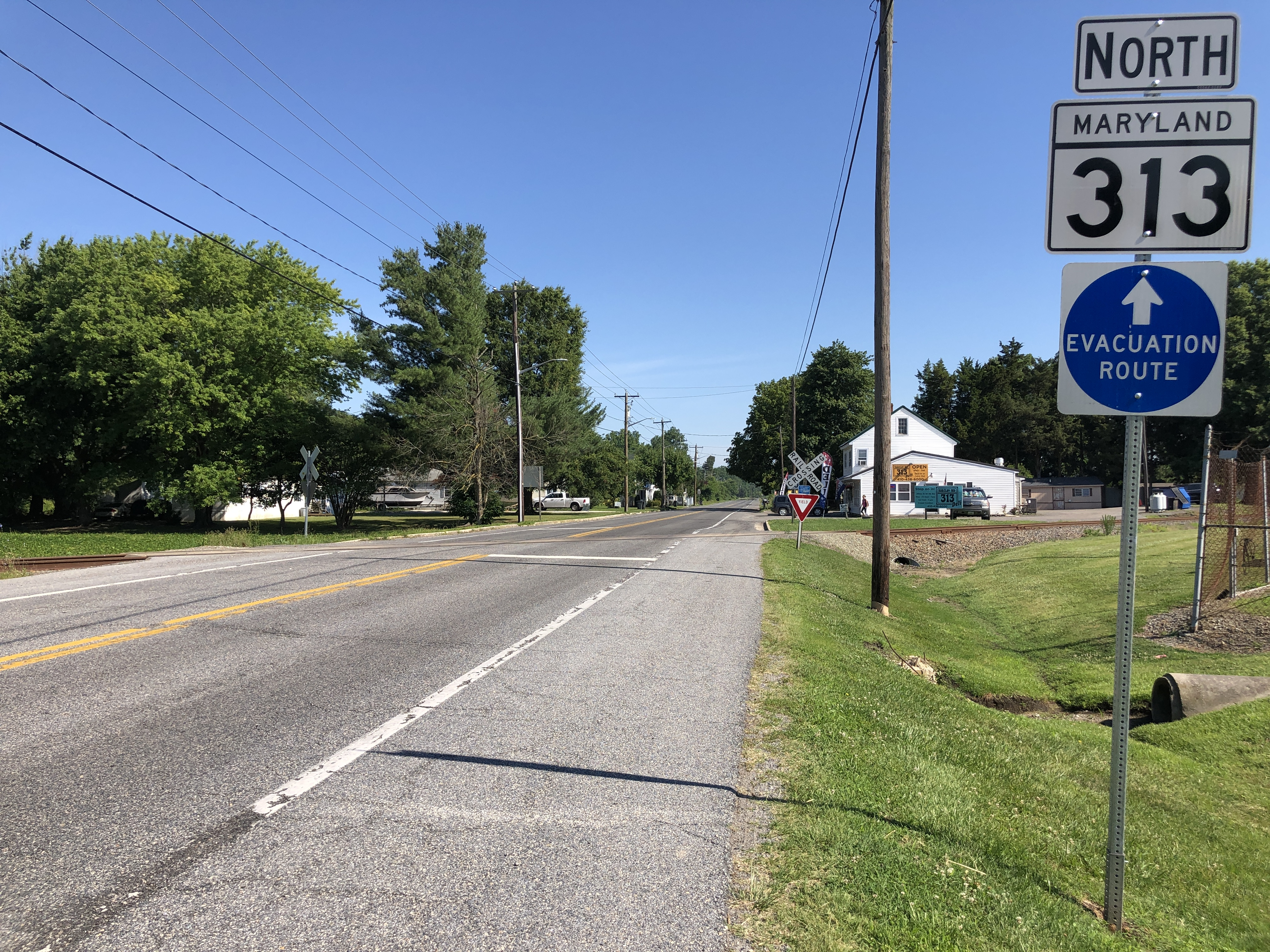
MD 313 northbound in Barclay

== Transportation ==
The primary method of travel to and from Barclay is by road. Maryland Route 313 is the north-south road serving the town, while Maryland Route 302 is the east-west highway serving Barclay. Both connect to U.S. Route 301, which provides a high-speed route to nearby metropolitan areas such as Philadelphia and Washington D.C.

== Demographics ==
Historical population
Census	Pop.	Note	%±
1940	119		—
1950	108		−9.2%
1960	142		31.5%
1970	187		31.7%
1980	132		−29.4%
1990	170		28.8%
2000	143		−15.9%
2010	120		−16.1%
2020	183		52.5%
U.S. Decennial Census

=== 2010 census ===
As of the census of 2010, there were 120 people, 48 households, and 32 families living in the town. The population density was 750.0 inhabitants per square mile (289.6/km^{2}). There were 57 housing units at an average density of 356.3 per square mile (137.6/km^{2}). The racial makeup of the town was 88.3% White, 0.8% African American, 4.2% Native American, and 6.7% from other races. Hispanic or Latino of any race were 9.2% of the population.

There were 48 households, of which 27.1% had children under the age of 18 living with them, 52.1% were married couples living together, 4.2% had a female householder with no husband present, 10.4% had a male householder with no wife present, and 33.3% were non-families. 29.2% of all households were made up of individuals, and 8.4% had someone living alone who was 65 years of age or older. The average household size was 2.50 and the average family size was 2.91.

The median age in the town was 42.5 years. 20% of residents were under the age of 18; 9.2% were between the ages of 18 and 24; 24.2% were from 25 to 44; 39.1% were from 45 to 64; and 7.5% were 65 years of age or older. The gender makeup of the town was 46.7% male and 53.3% female.

=== 2000 census ===
As of the census of 2000, there were 143 people, 54 households, and 42 families living in the town. The population density was 552.9 inhabitants per square mile (213.5/km^{2}). There were 60 housing units at an average density of 232.0 per square mile (89.6/km^{2}). The racial makeup of the town was 92.31% White, 6.99% African American, and 0.70% from two or more races.

There were 54 households, out of which 42.6% had children under the age of 18 living with them, 63.0% were married couples living together, 13.0% had a female householder with no husband present, and 22.2% were non-families. 20.4% of all households were made up of individuals, and 9.3% had someone living alone who was 65 years of age or older. The average household size was 2.65 and the average family size was 3.07.

In the town, the population was spread out, with 30.1% under the age of 18, 4.2% from 18 to 24, 30.8% from 25 to 44, 25.2% from 45 to 64, and 9.8% who were 65 years of age or older. The median age was 38 years. For every 100 females, there were 76.5 males. For every 100 females age 18 and over, there were 81.8 males.

The median income for a household in the town was $41,250, and the median income for a family was $46,250. Males had a median income of $36,250 versus $18,750 for females. The per capita income for the town was $19,698. There were none of the families and 2.5% of the population living below the poverty line, including no under eighteens and none of those over 64.

== Notable residents ==
Politician William J. Winchester was born in Barclay circa 1876. He left Barclay for Wilmington, Delaware in 1888.
