= Castle Hall (Goldsboro, Maryland) =

Historic house in Maryland, United States

- U.S. National Register of Historic Places
- Location within Maryland Location within the United States
- Location: 16070 Henderson Rd., Goldsboro, Maryland
- Coordinates: 39°3′5″N 75°47′8″W
- Area: 5.739 acres (2.322 ha)
- Built: 1781
- Built by: Hardcastle, Thomas H.
- Architectural style: Colonial Revival, Late Georgian
- NRHP reference No.: 75000872
- Added to NRHP: December 4, 1975

Castle Hall (also known as Golden Bottom) is a historic home, formerly part of a larger farm of the same name. The home itself is on a 5.739 acre parcel that was subdivided from the farm in the late 20th century. The surrounding farm, still used for agricultural purposes, is located in Goldsboro, Caroline County, Maryland, and covers 676 acres. The main structure is a three-part "telescope" house, so called because it was built in stages, with each successive addition being smaller than the previous one. The original 2 1/2-story portion is the largest of the three parts and stands at the northeast end. The smallest of the three parts is constructed of both wood framing and brick, unlike the rest of the structure which is almost entirely brick. It was built by Thomas Hardcastle in 1781.

It was listed on the National Register of Historic Places in 1975.
