= Goldsboro, Maryland =

- Town
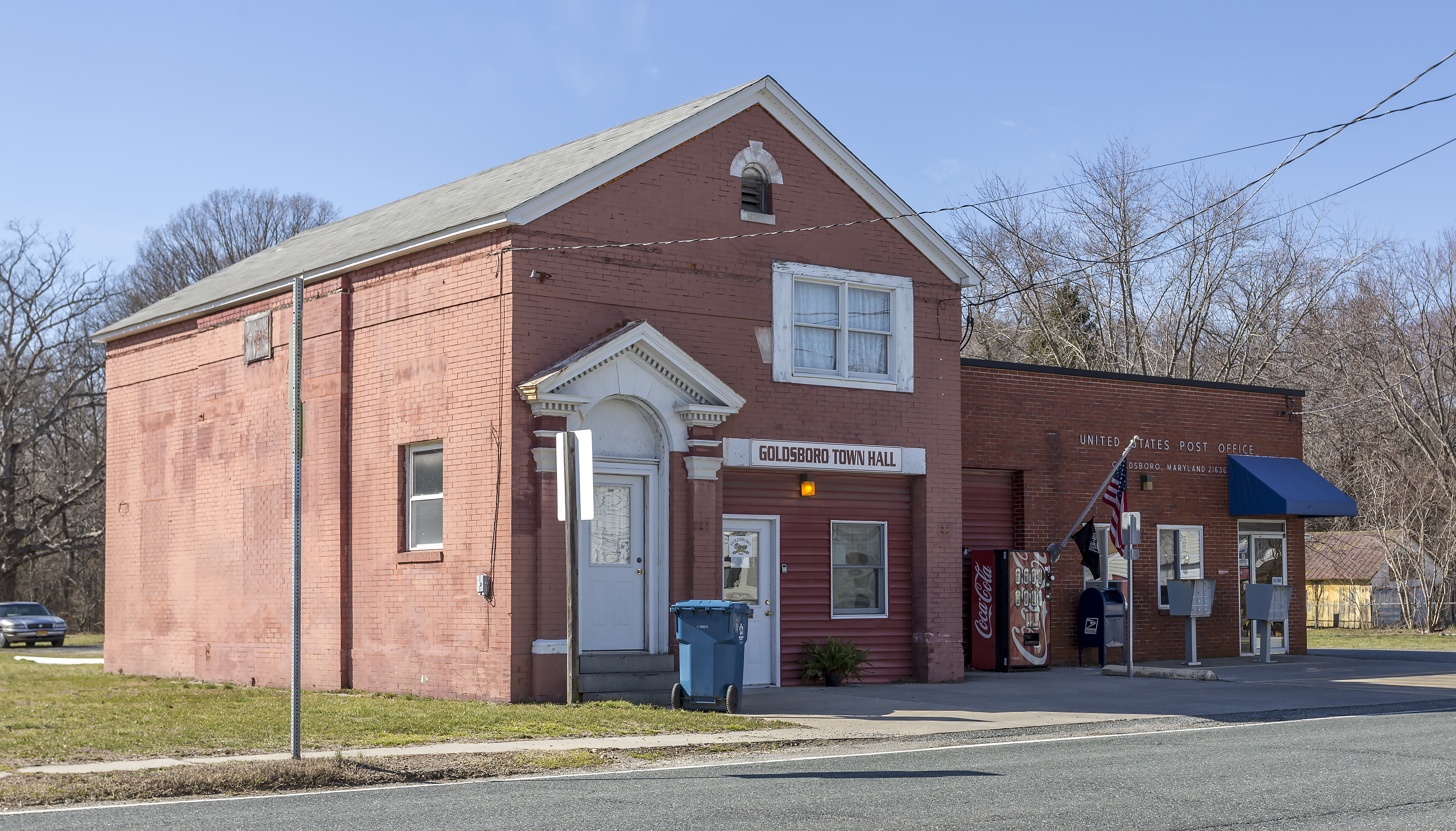
- The Goldsboro town hall and post office in 2016

- Logo

- Location of Goldsboro, Maryland

- Location within the U.S. state of Maryland Goldsboro (the United States)
- Coordinates: 39°2′8″N 75°47′14″W
- Country: United States of America
- State: Maryland
- County: Caroline
- Incorporated: 1906

Government
  - Mayor: William Jamie Yeager

Area
  - Total: 0.79 sq mi (2.05 km^{2})
  - Land: 0.78 sq mi (2.02 km^{2})
  - Water: 0.012 sq mi (0.03 km^{2})
- Elevation: 56 ft (17 m)

Population (2020)
  - Total: 211
  - Density: 270.0/sq mi (104.24/km^{2})
- Time zone: UTC-5 (Eastern (EST))
  - Summer (DST): UTC-4 (EDT)
- ZIP code: 21636
- Area code: 410
- FIPS code: 24-33950
- GNIS feature ID: 0590343
- Website: https://goldsboromd.com/

Goldsboro is a town in Caroline County, Maryland, United States. As of the 2020 census, Goldsboro had a population of 211. The zip code is 21636. First known as Oldtown, it was renamed in 1870 for the prominent Goldsborough family who owned land in the area. Castle Hall was listed on the National Register of Historic Places in 1975.

== Geography ==
Goldsboro is located at 39°2′8″N 75°47′14″W (39.035483, -75.787085).

According to the United States Census Bureau, the town has a total area of 0.75 square miles (1.94 km^{2}), of which 0.74 square miles (1.92 km^{2}) is land and 0.01 square miles (0.03 km^{2}) is water.

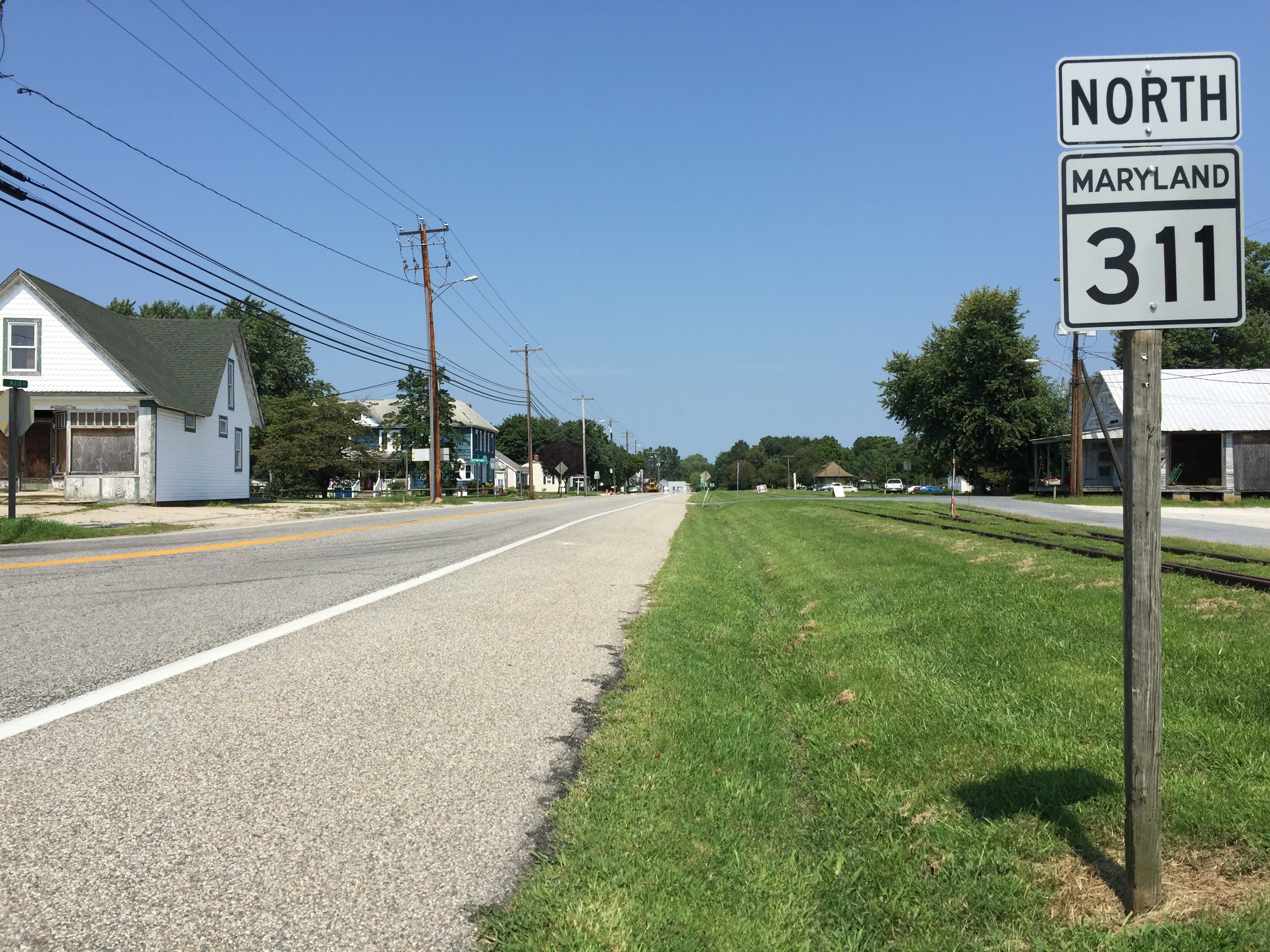
MD 311 northbound in Goldsboro

== Transportation ==
The primary means of travel to and from Goldsboro is by road. Three state highways serve the town: Maryland Route 313, which, while signed north-south, comes in from the south but turns toward the west within the town; Maryland Route 311, which heads north out of town from MD 313; and Maryland Route 287, which departs eastward from MD 313 in Goldsboro.

== Demographics ==
Historical population
| Census | Pop. | Note | %± |
|---|---|---|---|
| 1910 | 201 | | — |
| 1920 | 224 | | 11.4% |
| 1930 | 211 | | −5.8% |
| 1940 | 197 | | −6.6% |
| 1950 | 198 | | 0.5% |
| 1960 | 204 | | 3.0% |
| 1970 | 231 | | 13.2% |
| 1980 | 188 | | −18.6% |
| 1990 | 185 | | −1.6% |
| 2000 | 216 | | 16.8% |
| 2010 | 246 | | 13.9% |
| 2020 | 211 | | −14.2% |
U.S. Decennial Census

=== 2010 census ===
As of the census of 2010, there were 246 people, 87 households, and 69 families living in the town. The population density was 332.4 inhabitants per square mile (128.3/km^{2}). There were 97 housing units at an average density of 131.1 per square mile (50.6/km^{2}). The racial makeup of the town was 87.0% White, 4.9% African American, 0.4% Native American, 7.3% from other races, and 0.4% from two or more races. Hispanic or Latino of any race were 8.1% of the population.

There were 87 households, of which 43.7% had children under the age of 18 living with them, 54.0% were married couples living together, 18.4% had a female householder with no husband present, 6.9% had a male householder with no wife present, and 20.7% were non-families. 19.5% of all households were made up of individuals, and 12.6% had someone living alone who was 65 years of age or older. The average household size was 2.83 and the average family size was 3.10.

The median age in the town was 34 years. 30.5% of residents were under the age of 18; 7.6% were between the ages of 18 and 24; 31.2% were from 25 to 44; 15.9% were from 45 to 64; and 14.6% were 65 years of age or older. The gender makeup of the town was 46.7% male and 53.3% female.

=== 2000 census ===
As of the census of 2000, there were 216 people, 77 households, and 58 families living in the town. The population density was 1,221.5 inhabitants per square mile (471.6/km^{2}). There were 84 housing units at an average density of 475.0 per square mile (183.4/km^{2}). The racial makeup of the town was 93.98% White, 5.56% African American, and 0.46% from two or more races. Hispanic or Latino of any race were 2.78% of the population.

There were 77 households, out of which 37.7% had children under the age of 18 living with them, 54.5% were married couples living together, 13.0% had a female householder with no husband present, and 23.4% were non-families. 20.8% of all households were made up of individuals, and 7.8% had someone living alone who was 65 years of age or older. The average household size was 2.81 and the average family size was 3.17.

In the town, the population was spread out, with 31.5% under the age of 18, 5.6% from 18 to 24, 31.0% from 25 to 44, 21.3% from 45 to 64, and 10.6% who were 65 years of age or older. The median age was 32 years. For every 100 females, there were 98.2 males. For every 100 females age 18 and over, there were 102.7 males.

The median income for a household in the town was $39,500, and the median income for a family was $38,750. Males had a median income of $27,083 versus $23,750 for females. The per capita income for the town was $14,548. About 5.1% of families and 9.6% of the population were below the poverty line, including 21.7% of those under the age of eighteen and none of those 65 or over.
