= Eldorado, Maryland =

- Town
- Location of Eldorado, Maryland
- Coordinates: 38°35′6″N 75°47′15″W
- Country: United States
- State: Maryland
- County: Dorchester
- Incorporated: 1947

Area
  - Total: 0.077 sq mi (0.20 km^{2})
  - Land: 0.073 sq mi (0.19 km^{2})
  - Water: 0.0039 sq mi (0.01 km^{2})
- Elevation: 9.8 ft (3 m)

Population (2020)
  - Total: 45
  - Density: 619.8/sq mi (239.29/km^{2})
- Time zone: UTC-5 (Eastern (EST))
  - Summer (DST): UTC-4 (EDT)
- ZIP code: 21659
- Area codes: 410, 443, and 667
- FIPS code: 24-25600
- GNIS feature ID: 0584269

Eldorado /ˌɛldəˈreɪdoʊ/ EL-də-RAY-doh is a town in Dorchester County, Maryland, United States. The population was 45 at the 2020 census, making it the second smallest town in Maryland.

== History ==
Rehoboth was listed on the National Register of Historic Places in 1972. The Willin Village Archeological Site was listed in 1975.

== Geography ==
Eldorado is located at 38°35′6″N 75°47′15″W (38.584874, -75.787617).

According to the United States Census Bureau, the town has a total area of 0.08 square mile (0.21 km^{2}), all land.

== Demographics ==
Historical population
Census	Pop.	Note	%±
1950	79		—
1960	80		1.3%
1970	99		23.8%
1980	93		−6.1%
1990	49		−47.3%
2000	60		22.4%
2010	59		−1.7%
2020	45		−23.7%
U.S. Decennial Census

=== 2010 census ===
As of the census of 2010, there were 59 people, 23 households, and 17 families living in the town. The population density was 737.5 inhabitants per square mile (284.8/km^{2}). There were 26 housing units at an average density of 325.0 per square mile (125.5/km^{2}). The racial makeup of the town was 81.4% White, 10.2% African American, 1.7% Asian, and 6.8% from two or more races. Hispanic or Latino of any race were 1.7% of the population.

There were 23 households, of which 43.5% had children under the age of 18 living with them, 39.1% were married couples living together, 26.1% had a female householder with no husband present, 8.7% had a male householder with no wife present, and 26.1% were non-families. 21.7% of all households were made up of individuals, and 8.7% had someone living alone who was 65 years of age or older. The average household size was 2.57 and the average family size was 2.94.

The median age in the town was 37.3 years. 28.8% of residents were under the age of 18; 3.5% were between the ages of 18 and 24; 28.9% were from 25 to 44; 27.2% were from 45 to 64; and 11.9% were 65 years of age or older. The gender makeup of the town was 47.5% male and 52.5% female.

=== 2000 census ===
As of the census of 2000, there were 60 people, 26 households, and 15 families living in the town. The population density was 762.6 inhabitants per square mile (294.4/km^{2}). There were 29 housing units at an average density of 368.6 per square mile (142.3/km^{2}). The racial makeup of the town was 96.67% White, 1.67% African American, and 1.67% from two or more races.

There were 26 households, out of which 30.8% had children under the age of 18 living with them, 34.6% were married couples living together, 15.4% had a female householder with no husband present, and 42.3% were non-families. 38.5% of all households were made up of individuals, and 15.4% had someone living alone who was 65 years of age or older. The average household size was 2.31 and the average family size was 3.13.

In the town, the population was spread out, with 28.3% under the age of 18, 5.0% from 18 to 24, 23.3% from 25 to 44, 28.3% from 45 to 64, and 15.0% who were 65 years of age or older. The median age was 41 years. For every 100 females, there were 76.5 males. For every 100 females age 18 and over, there were 72.0 males.

The median income for a household in the town was $33,125, and the median income for a family was $34,375. Males had a median income of $30,417 versus $22,321 for females. The per capita income for the town was $14,494. There were 6.7% of families and 17.5% of the population living below the poverty line, including no under eighteens and 25.0% of those over 64.
