= Templeville, Maryland =

- Town
- Location of Templeville, Maryland

- Location within the U.S. state of Maryland Templeville (the United States)
- Coordinates: 39°8′11″N 75°46′6″W
- Country: United States
- State: Maryland
- Counties: Queen Anne's, Caroline
- Incorporated: 1865

Area
  - Total: 0.054 sq mi (0.14 km^{2})
  - Land: 0.054 sq mi (0.14 km^{2})
  - Water: 0 sq mi (0.00 km^{2})
- Elevation: 69 ft (21 m)

Population (2020)
  - Total: 113
  - Density: 2,073.3/sq mi (800.51/km^{2})
- Time zone: UTC-5 (Eastern (EST))
  - Summer (DST): UTC-4 (EDT)
- ZIP code: 21670
- Area code: 410
- FIPS code: 24-77200
- GNIS feature ID: 0591398

Templeville is a town in Caroline and Queen Anne's counties, Maryland, United States. Templeville is located near the Maryland-Delaware line. As of the 2020 census, Templeville had a population of 113. It was known as Bullock Town until the name was changed in 1847. The name Templeville derives from the Temple family, whose most famous member was Governor William Temple of Delaware.

== History ==
Originally called "Bullock Town", the town changed its name to "Templeville" in 1847. The name was chosen based on "one of several historic cemeteries located near the town". Templeville was originally incorporated in 1865; the charter was renewed in 1947.

== Geography ==
Templeville is located at 39°8′11″N 75°46′6″W (39.136330, −75.768398).

According to the United States Census Bureau, the town has a total area of 0.08 square miles (0.21 km^{2}), all land.

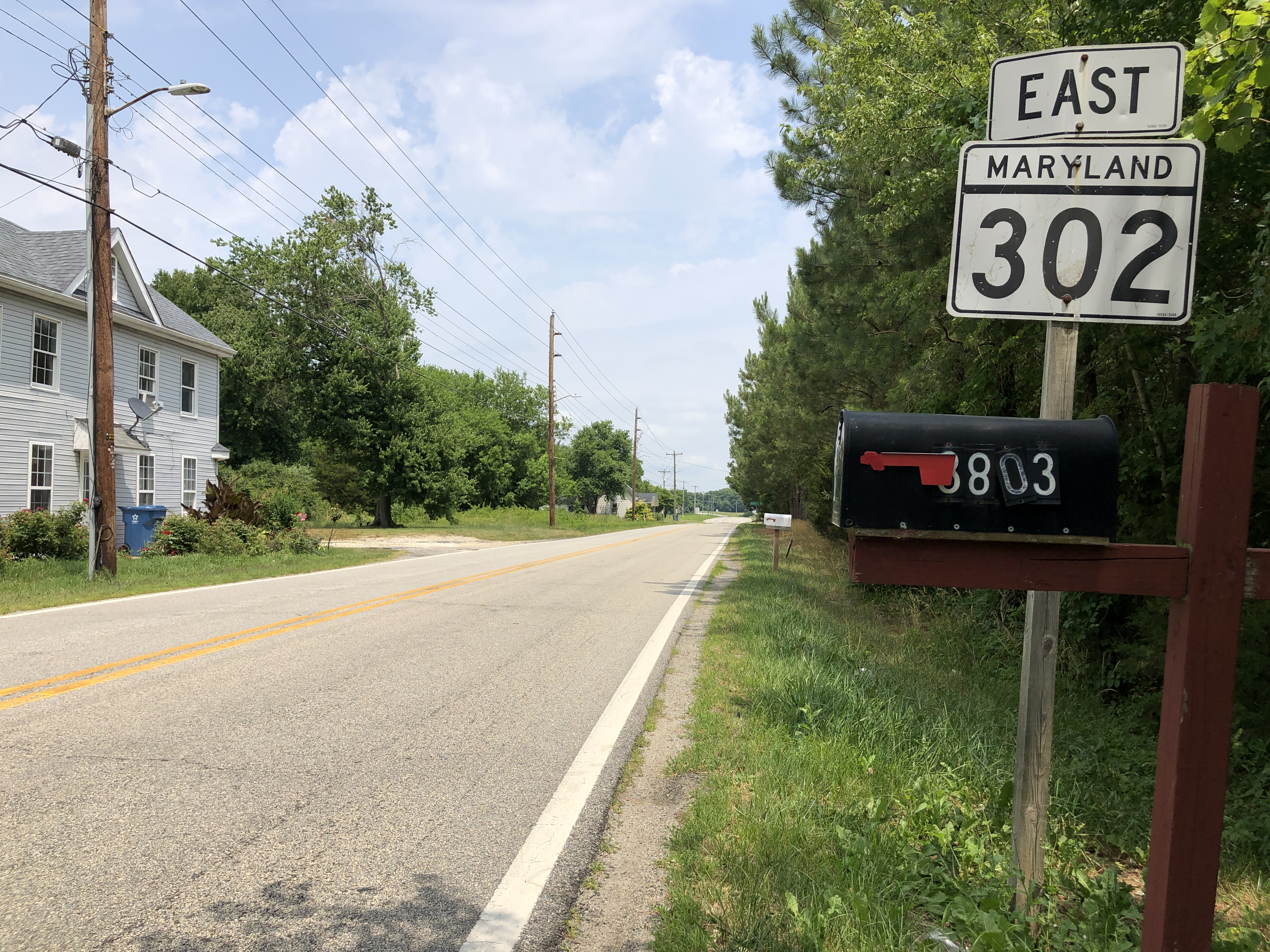
MD 302 eastbound in Templeville

== Transportation ==
The main method of travel to and from Templeville is by road, and two state highways serve the town. Maryland Route 302 traverses the town from east to west, while Maryland Route 454 heads south out of the town from its terminus at MD 302.

== Demographics ==
Historical population
| Census | Pop. | Note | %± |
|---|---|---|---|
| 1880 | 101 | | — |
| 1950 | 82 | | — |
| 1960 | 98 | | 19.5% |
| 1970 | 102 | | 4.1% |
| 1980 | 96 | | −5.9% |
| 1990 | 66 | | −31.2% |
| 2000 | 80 | | 21.2% |
| 2010 | 138 | | 72.5% |
| 2020 | 113 | | −18.1% |
U.S. Decennial Census

=== 2010 census ===
As of the 2010 census, there were 138 people, 39 households, and 27 families living in the town. The population density was 1,725.0 inhabitants per square mile (666.0/km^{2}). There were 43 housing units at an average density of 537.5 per square mile (207.5/km^{2}). The racial makeup of the town was 47.8% White, 0.7% Native American, 50.7% from other races, and 0.7% from two or more races. Hispanic or Latino of any race were 60.1% of the population.

There were 39 households, of which 43.6% had children under the age of 18 living with them, 38.5% were married couples living together, 20.5% had a female householder with no husband present, 10.3% had a male householder with no wife present, and 30.8% were non-families. 25.6% of all households were made up of individuals, and 12.9% had someone living alone who was 65 years of age or older. The average household size was 3.54 and the average family size was 3.89.

The median age in the town was 27.3 years. 27.5% of residents were under the age of 18; 15.9% were between the ages of 18 and 24; 35.4% were from 25 to 44; 14.4% were from 45 to 64; and 6.5% were 65 years of age or older. The gender makeup of the town was 50.7% male and 49.3% female.

=== 2000 census ===
As of the 2000 census, there were 80 people, 32 households, and 14 families living in the town. The population density was 1,084.8 inhabitants per square mile (418.8/km^{2}). There were 37 housing units at an average density of 501.7 per square mile (193.7/km^{2}). The racial makeup of the town was 77.50% White, 5.00% African American, 1.25% Native American, 8.75% Asian, 5.00% from other races, and 2.50% from two or more races. Hispanic or Latino of any race were 5.00% of the population.

There were 32 households, out of which 28.1% had children under the age of 18 living with them, 21.9% were married couples living together, 12.5% had a female householder with no husband present, and 56.3% were non-families. 50.0% of all households were made up of individuals, and 31.3% had someone living alone who was 65 years of age or older. The average household size was 2.50 and the average family size was 3.79.

In the town, the population was spread out, with 27.5% under the age of 18, 12.5% from 18 to 24, 26.3% from 25 to 44, 16.3% from 45 to 64, and 17.5% who were 65 years of age or older. The median age was 36 years. For every 100 females, there were 86.0 males. For every 100 females age 18 and over, there were 87.1 males.

The median income for a household in the town was $15,938, and the median income for a family was $24,375. Males had a median income of $26,667 versus $15,625 for females. The per capita income for the town was $10,202. There were 40.0% of families and 40.7% of the population living below the poverty line, including 30.0% of under eighteens and none of those over 64.
