= Marydel, Maryland =

- Town
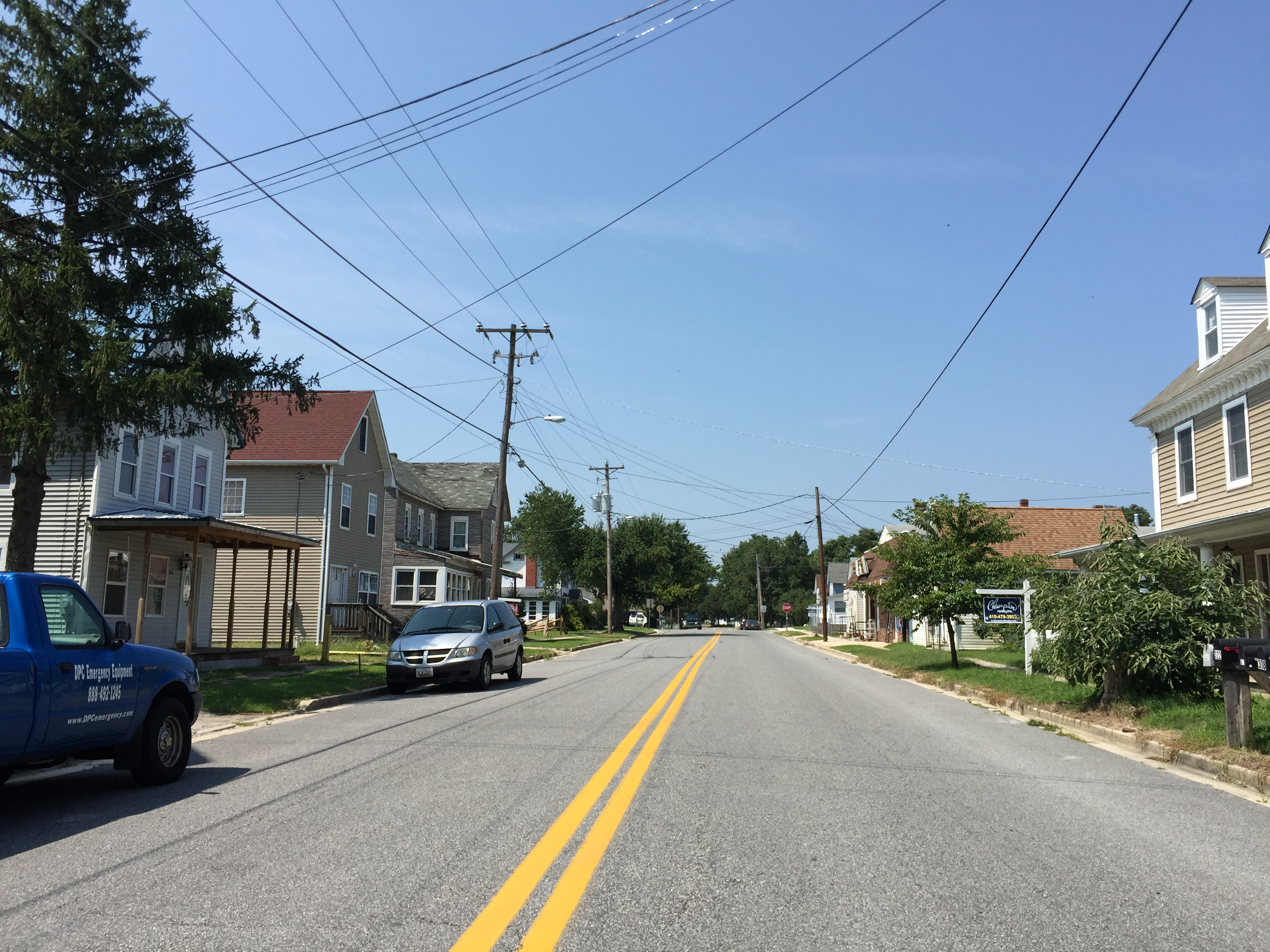
- Main Street in Marydel

- Location of Marydel, Maryland

- Location within the U.S. state of Maryland Marydel (the United States)
- Coordinates: 39°6.8′N 75°44.8′W
- Country: United States of America
- State: Maryland
- County: Caroline
- Incorporated: 1929

Area
  - Total: 0.12 sq mi (0.31 km^{2})
  - Land: 0.12 sq mi (0.31 km^{2})
  - Water: 0 sq mi (0.00 km^{2})
- Elevation: 59 ft (18 m)

Population (2020)
  - Total: 176
  - Density: 1,489.0/sq mi (574.91/km^{2})
- Time zone: UTC-5 (Eastern (EST))
  - Summer (DST): UTC-4 (EDT)
- ZIP code: 21649
- Area code: 410
- FIPS code: 24-51025
- GNIS feature ID: 0590751

Marydel is an incorporated town in Caroline County, Maryland, United States. As of the 2020 census, Marydel had a population of 176. Its name is a portmanteau, after its location, being partially located in Maryland and partially in Delaware. Marydel was originally known as Halltown.

Publisher James Gordon Bennett Jr. participated in a duel near Marydel in 1877.

== Geography ==
Marydel is located at 39°6.8′N 75°44.8′W (39.1130, -75.7468).

According to the United States Census Bureau, the town has a total area of 0.08 square miles (0.21 km^{2}), all land.

== History ==
The town of Marydel was settled by Austro-Hungarian Catholic farmers circa 1914, around the time that the Austro-Hungarian Empire was about to plunge Europe into World War I, and some immigrants from that area came to the United States. In recent times, beginning in the 1990s, the town became home to a large community of Hispanic immigrants of Guatemalan descent. The majority of these Guatemalan immigrants came from an agricultural, rural, mountainous regions in Guatemala (specifically rural San Marcos), making them feel at home in rural, agricultural (though not mountainous) Caroline County. This community is primarily Spanish speaking, with some of the Guatemalan Mam dialect mixed in. Many of Marydel's Guatemalans have become permanent residents and American citizens.

== Transportation ==
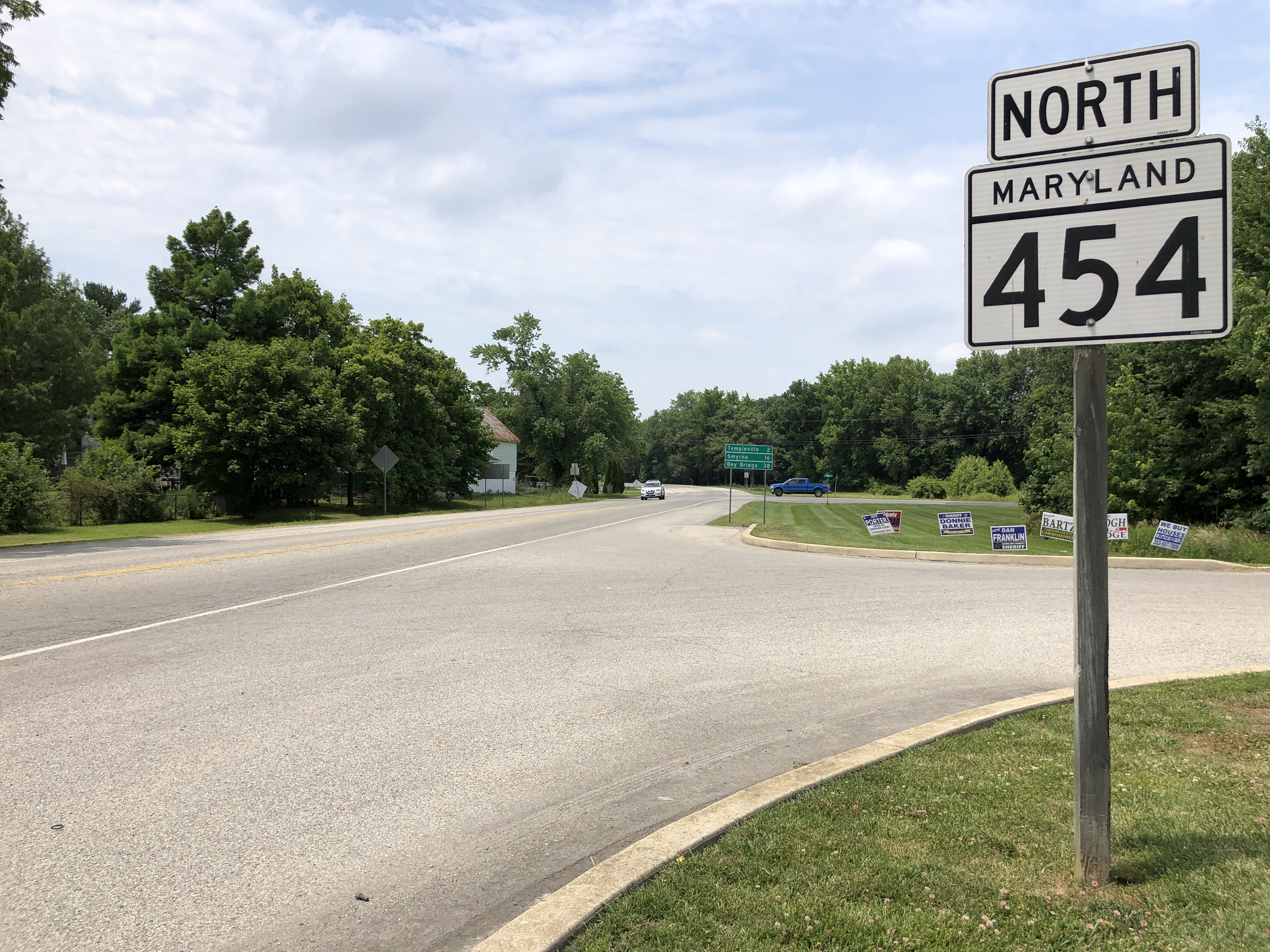
MD 454 northbound in Marydel

The primary means of travel to and from Marydel is by road, and three state highways serve the town. Maryland Route 311 travels south from Marydel, and Maryland Route 454 travels northwestward. Maryland Route 821 follows Main Street through central Marydel. In addition, Delaware Route 8 ends at the town and state line and heads eastward from Marydel.

== Demographics ==
Historical population
| Census | Pop. | Note | %± |
|---|---|---|---|
| 1880 | 98 | | — |
| 1930 | 127 | | — |
| 1940 | 78 | | −38.6% |
| 1950 | 110 | | 41.0% |
| 1960 | 130 | | 18.2% |
| 1970 | 176 | | 35.4% |
| 1980 | 152 | | −13.6% |
| 1990 | 143 | | −5.9% |
| 2000 | 147 | | 2.8% |
| 2010 | 141 | | −4.1% |
| 2020 | 176 | | 24.8% |
U.S. Decennial Census

=== 2010 census ===
As of the census of 2010, there were 141 people, 36 households, and 24 families living in the town. The population density was 1,762.5 inhabitants per square mile (680.5/km^{2}). There were 50 housing units at an average density of 625.0 per square mile (241.3/km^{2}). The racial makeup of the town was 46.1% White, 3.5% African American, 0.7% Native American, 1.4% Asian, 46.1% from other races, and 2.1% from two or more races. Hispanic or Latino of any race were 53.9% of the population.

There were 36 households, of which 44.4% had children under the age of 18 living with them, 58.3% were married couples living together, 2.8% had a female householder with no husband present, 5.6% had a male householder with no wife present, and 33.3% were non-families. 22.2% of all households were made up of individuals, and 13.9% had someone living alone who was 65 years of age or older. The average household size was 3.92 and the average family size was 4.83.

The median age in the town was 26.1 years. 36.2% of residents were under the age of 18; 12.6% were between the ages of 18 and 24; 25.5% were from 25 to 44; 14.8% were from 45 to 64; and 10.6% were 65 years of age or older. The gender makeup of the town was 51.8% male and 48.2% female.

=== 2000 census ===
As of the census of 2000, there were 147 people, 47 households, and 32 families living in the town. The population density was 2,353.5 inhabitants per square mile (908.7/km^{2}). There were 52 housing units at an average density of 832.5 per square mile (321.4/km^{2}). The racial makeup of the town was 85.71% White, 6.80% African American, 2.72% Native American, 0.68% Asian, and 4.08% from two or more races. Hispanic or Latino of any race were 8.16% of the population.

There were 47 households, out of which 38.3% had children under the age of 18 living with them, 48.9% were married couples living together, 17.0% had a female householder with no husband present, and 29.8% were non-families. 25.5% of all households were made up of individuals, and 8.5% had someone living alone who was 65 years of age or older. The average household size was 3.00 and the average family size was 3.42.

In the town, the population was spread out, with 28.6% under the age of 18, 12.2% from 18 to 24, 31.3% from 25 to 44, 18.4% from 45 to 64, and 9.5% who were 65 years of age or older. The median age was 32 years. For every 100 females, there were 116.2 males. For every 100 females age 18 and over, there were 133.3 males.

The median income for a household in the town was $25,250, and the median income for a family was $26,500. Males had a median income of $22,083 versus $12,083 for females. The per capita income for the town was $12,379. There were 20.8% of families and 16.5% of the population living below the poverty line, including 24.2% of under eighteens and none of those over 64.

== See also ==
- Mason–Dixon line
- Marydel, Delaware
