= Henderson, Maryland =

- Town
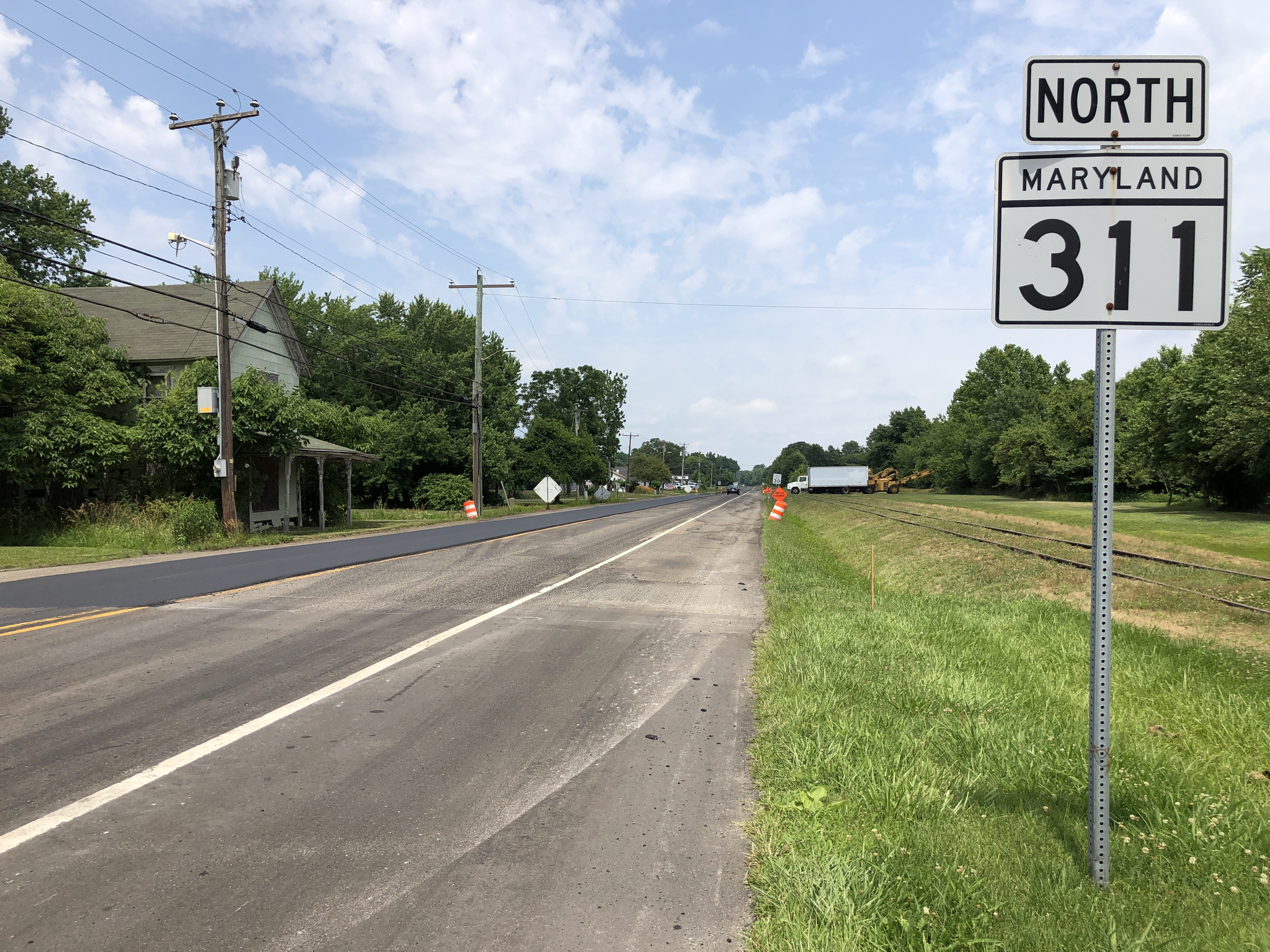
- MD 311 northbound in Henderson

- Location of Henderson, Maryland

- Location within the U.S. state of Maryland Henderson (the United States)
- Coordinates: 39°4′26″N 75°45′59″W
- Country: United States of America
- State: Maryland
- County: Caroline
- Incorporated: 1949

Area
  - Total: 0.12 sq mi (0.32 km^{2})
  - Land: 0.12 sq mi (0.32 km^{2})
  - Water: 0 sq mi (0.00 km^{2})
- Elevation: 56 ft (17 m)

Population (2020)
  - Total: 160
  - Density: 1,278.6/sq mi (493.68/km^{2})
- Time zone: UTC-5 (Eastern (EST))
  - Summer (DST): UTC-4 (EDT)
- ZIP code: 21640
- Area code: 410
- FIPS code: 24-37925
- GNIS feature ID: 0590445

Henderson is a town in Caroline County, Maryland, United States. As of the 2020 census, Henderson had a population of 160. It was named for a stockholder of the Delaware and Chesapeake Railroad.

Athol was listed on the National Register of Historic Places in 1989.

== Geography ==
According to the United States Census Bureau, the town has a total area of 0.13 square miles (0.34 km^{2}), all land.

== Demographics ==
Historical population
Census	Pop.	Note	%±
1880	52		—
1950	106		—
1960	129		21.7%
1970	135		4.7%
1980	156		15.6%
1990	66		−57.7%
2000	118		78.8%
2010	146		23.7%
2020	160		9.6%
U.S. Decennial Census

=== 2010 census ===
At the census of 2010, there were 146 people, 44 households and 28 families residing in the town. The population density was 1,123.1 per square mile (433.6/km^{2}). There were 51 housing units at an average density of 392.3 per square mile (151.5/km^{2}). The racial make-up of the town was 65.8% White, 2.1% African American, 0.7% Native American, 30.8% from other races and 0.7% from two or more races. Hispanic or Latino of any race were 37% of the population.

There were 44 households, of which 38.6% had children under the age of 18 living with them, 47.7% were married couples living together, 4.5% had a female householder with no husband present, 11.4% had a male householder with no wife present, and 36.4% were non-families. 22.7% of all households were made up of individuals, and 6.8% had someone living alone who was 65 years of age or older. The average household size was 3.32 and the average family size was 3.64.

The median age was 30 years. 23.3% of residents were under the age of 18, 13% were between the ages of 18 and 24, 34.2% were from 25 to 44, 23.9% were from 45 to 64 and 5.5% were 65 years of age or older. The sex make-up of the town was 52.7% male and 47.3% female.

The median household income was $32,500 and the median family income was $33,125. Males had a median income of $30,625 and females $21,875. The per capita income was $11,678. There were 16.1% of families and 14.2% of the population living below the poverty line, including 15.2% of under eighteens and 16.7% of those over 64.

== Transportation ==
- Maryland Route 311
