= National Register of Historic Places listings in Caroline County, Maryland =

Location of Caroline County in Maryland

This is a list of the National Register of Historic Places listings in Caroline County, Maryland.

This is intended to be a complete list of the properties and districts on the National Register of Historic Places in Caroline County, Maryland, United States. Latitude and longitude coordinates are provided for many National Register properties and districts; these locations may be seen together in a map.

There are 24 properties and districts listed on the National Register in the county.

Contents: Counties in Maryland
Allegany - Anne Arundel - Baltimore (city) - Baltimore County - Calvert - Caroline - Carroll - Cecil - Charles - Dorchester - Frederick - Garrett - Harford - Howard - Kent - Montgomery - Prince George's - Queen Anne's - Somerset - St. Mary's - Talbot - Washington - Wicomico - Worcester

This National Park Service list is complete through NPS recent listings posted February 20, 2026.

== Current listings ==
	Name on the Register	Image	Date listed	Location	City or town	Description
1	Athol	Athol	June 9, 1989 (#89000485)	Melville Rd. near Trunk Line Rd. 39°05′15″N 75°47′41″W	Henderson	
2	Brick House Farm	Brick House Farm	December 2, 2009 (#09000963)	24870 E. Cherry Ln. 39°00′38″N 75°50′21″W	Greensboro	
3	Castle Hall	Castle Hall	December 4, 1975 (#75000872)	8 miles north of Goldsboro on Maryland Route 311; 39°03′05″N 75°47′08″W	Goldsboro	
4	Chambers Park Log Cabin	Chambers Park Log Cabin	June 28, 2016 (#16000408)	Liberty Rd. 38°41′37″N 75°45′42″W	Federalsburg	
5	Daffin House		October 21, 1975 (#75000873)	3 miles south of Hillsboro on Deep Branch Rd. 38°52′31″N 75°55′47″W	Hillsboro	
6	Delaware Boundary Markers	Delaware Boundary Markers	February 18, 1975 (#75002101)	Boundary line dividing Delaware from Maryland and Pennsylvania	Multiple	Extends into Delaware and southeastern Pennsylvania.
7	Denton Armory	Denton Armory	September 25, 1985 (#85002665)	Maple Ave. and Randolph St. 38°53′02″N 75°49′53″W	Denton	
8	Denton Historic District	Denton Historic District	December 1, 1983 (#83003738)	Roughly bounded by 1st, 10th, Gay, High, Franklin, and Sunnyside Sts. 38°53′07″N 75°49′41″W	Denton	
9	Denton Schoolhouse	Denton Schoolhouse	April 19, 1978 (#78001447)	104 S. 2nd St. 38°53′07″N 75°50′02″W	Denton	
10	Exeter	Exeter	January 3, 1978 (#78001448)	North of Federalsburg on Maryland Route 630; 38°42′10″N 75°46′37″W	Federalsburg	
11	Federalsburg West Historic District	Federalsburg West Historic District	May 12, 2016 (#16000250)	Roughly bounded by Railroad, University & Bloomingdale Aves., Denton & Idlewild Rds. & Marshyhope Creek; 38°41′55″N 75°46′49″W	Federalsburg	
12	Leonard House	Leonard House	November 14, 1988 (#88001444)	Main St. 38°58′43″N 75°48′14″W	Greensboro	
13	Jacob and Hannah Leverton House		December 2, 2009 (#09000964)	3531 Seaman Rd. 38°42′09″N 75°53′29″W	Preston	
14	Linchester Mill	Linchester Mill	December 23, 2009 (#09001148)	3395 Linchester Rd. 38°42′03″N 75°53′51″W	Preston	
15	Marble Head	Marble Head	December 27, 2002 (#02001577)	24435 Marblehead Rd. 38°59′21″N 75°48′18″W	Ridgely	
16	Memory Lane	Memory Lane	October 12, 2000 (#00001200)	24700 Williston Rd. 38°49′51″N 75°50′54″W	Denton	
17	Nanticoke Lodge No. 172, A.F. and A.M.	Nanticoke Lodge No. 172, A.F. and A.M.	June 2, 2014 (#14000270)	112-116 N. Main St. 38°41′42″N 75°46′26″W	Federalsburg	
18	Neck Meetinghouse and Yard	Neck Meetinghouse and Yard	October 22, 1976 (#76000982)	Maryland Route 404; 38°53′26″N 75°50′29″W	West Denton	
19	Oak Lawn	Oak Lawn	May 28, 1975 (#75000875)	2.8 miles north of Ridgely on Maryland Route 312; 38°58′50″N 75°52′51″W	Ridgely	
20	Potter Hall	Potter Hall	November 30, 1982 (#82001590)	Martin Lane; 38°49′52″N 75°51′10″W	Williston	
21	St. Paul's Episcopal Church	St. Paul's Episcopal Church	May 12, 1975 (#75000874)	South of Maryland Route 404; 38°54′56″N 75°56′32″W	Hillsboro	
22	West Denton Warehouse-Wharf	West Denton Warehouse-Wharf	November 15, 2000 (#00001285)	10215 River Landing Rd. 38°53′18″N 75°50′23″W	West Denton	
23	Williston Mill Historic District	Williston Mill Historic District	December 27, 2002 (#02001576)	24729 Williston Rd. 38°49′46″N 75°50′50″W	Denton	
24	Willow Grove	Willow Grove	June 13, 1972 (#72000573)	Maryland Route 457 off Maryland Route 213; 38°55′34″N 75°46′28″W	Greensboro	

== See also ==
- List of National Historic Landmarks in Maryland
- National Register of Historic Places listings in Maryland
