= Maryland Route 312 =

State highway in Maryland, United States

Maryland Route 312
- Maryland Route 312 highlighted in red

Route information
- Maintained by MDSHA
- Length: 11.41 mi (18.36 km)
- Existed: 1927–present

Major junctions
- South end: MD 404 near Ridgely
- MD 480 in Ridgely; MD 304 in Bridgetown
- North end: MD 313 at Baltimore Corner

Location
- Country: United States
- State: Maryland
- Counties: Caroline

Highway system
- Maryland highway system; Interstate; US; State; Scenic Byways
← MD 311	→ MD 313

Maryland Route 312 (MD 312) is a state highway in the U.S. state of Maryland. The state highway runs 11.41 miles (18.36 km) from MD 404 near Ridgely north to MD 313 at Baltimore Corner. MD 312 traverses northwestern Caroline County, connecting Ridgely with Bridgetown. The highway's first section was paved around Ridgely in the 1910s. The highway was completed from MD 404 to Ridgely in the mid-1920s and from north of Ridgely to Baltimore Corner in the late 1920s.

== Route description ==
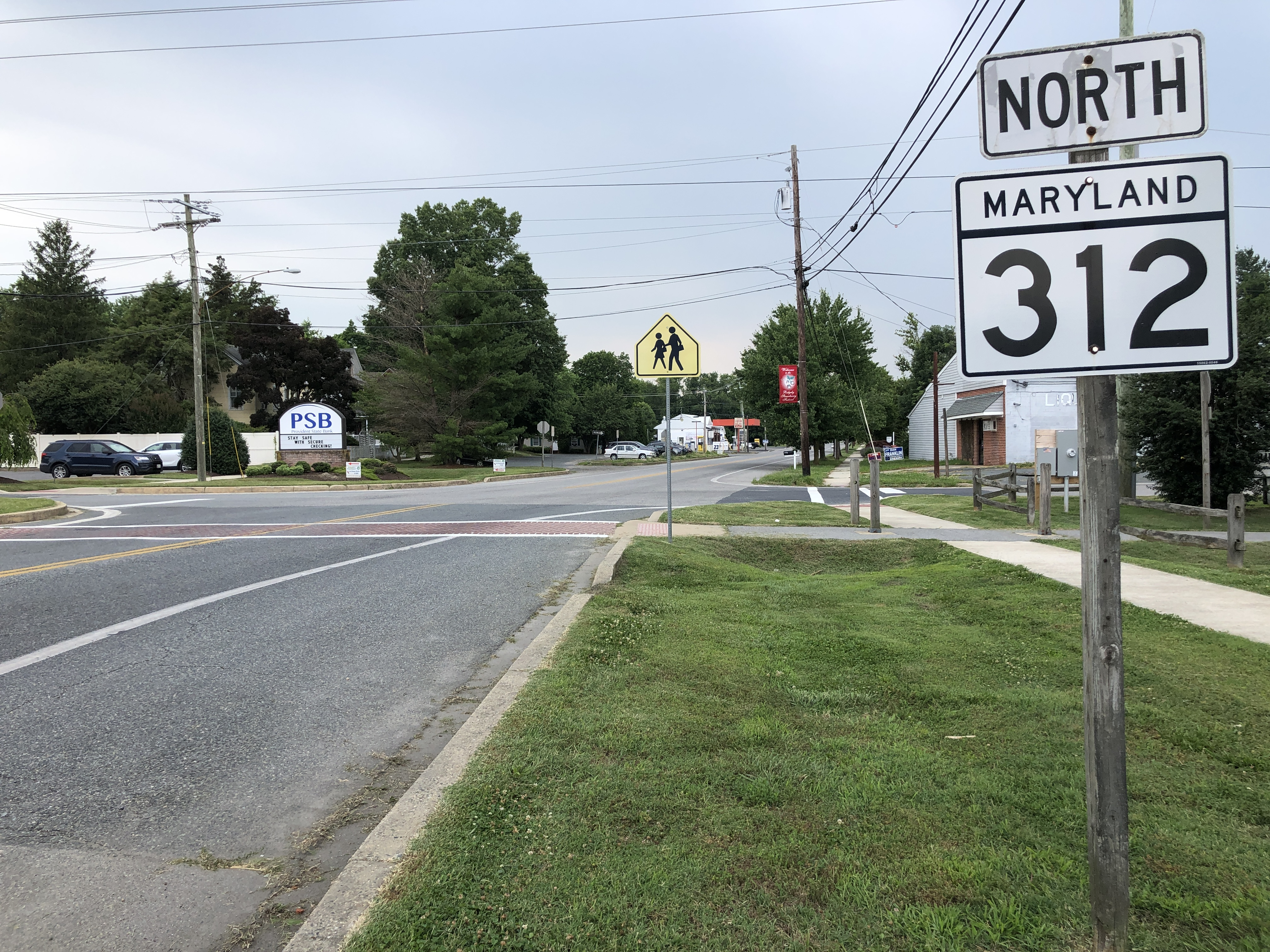
MD 312 northbound past MD 776 in Ridgely

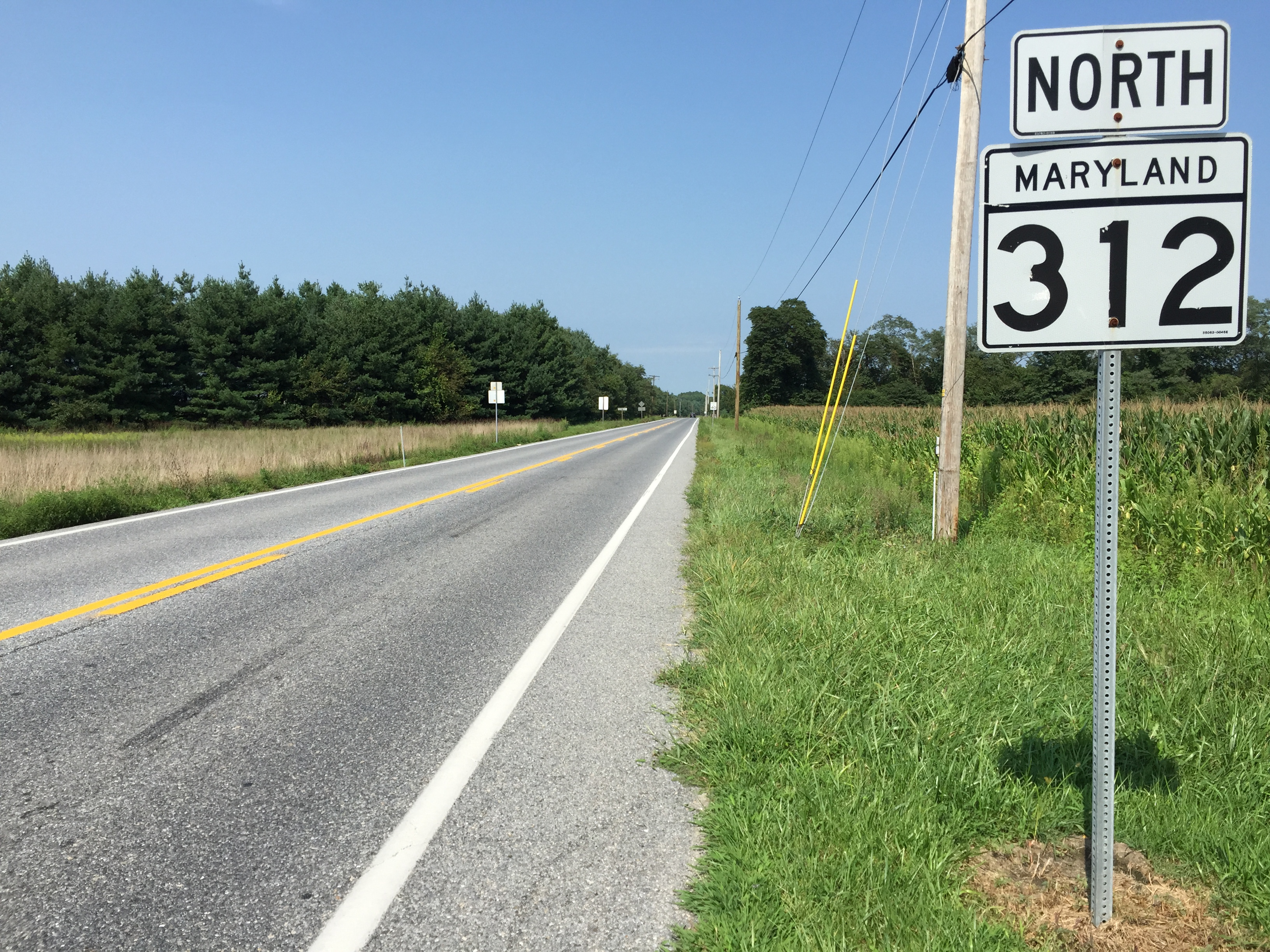
View north along MD 312 at MD 304 in Bridgetown

MD 312 begins at a superstreet intersection with MD 404 (Shore Highway) between the towns of Hillsboro and Denton. The roadway continues south as county-maintained Log Cabin Road. MD 312 heads north as two-lane undivided Downes Station Road, passing through farmland until it curves to the east and meets MD 480 (Ridgely Road) on a tangent, joining that highway in a concurrency. After MD 776 (Sunset Boulevard), the old alignment of MD 312, splits to the north, MD 312 and MD 480 enter the town of Ridgely and the highway's name changes to Sixth Street. MD 312 leaves MD 480 by turning north onto Central Avenue, a two-lane street with very wide shoulders used for angle or perpendicular parking. The state highway intersects an abandoned railroad grade owned by the Maryland Department of Transportation after meeting the other end of MD 776 (Railroad Avenue). MD 312 leaves the town of Ridgely shortly after passing west of Ridgely Elementary School. The state highway continues north through farmland as Oakland Road, passing west of Ridgely Airpark and through the hamlet of Oakland. MD 312 intersects the eastern terminus of MD 304 (Bridgetown Road) in Bridgetown and passes through a forested area before reaching its northern terminus at MD 313 (Goldsboro Road) at Baltimore Corner.

== History ==
The first section of MD 312 was paved through Ridgely and north about 1 mile (1.6 km) toward Oakland by 1921. That highway was extended to Oakland by 1923. The state highway was constructed between MD 404 at Long's School House Corner and Ridgely in 1924 and 1925. The remainder of the highway through Bridgetown to MD 313 at Baltimore Corner was constructed between 1926 and 1929. MD 312 originally followed Sunset Boulevard and Railroad Avenue through Ridgely, rejoining the present route at Railroad Avenue's intersection with Central Avenue, which headed south as MD 480. In 1953, Sixth Street was completed between Sunset Boulevard and Central Avenue. MD 312 and MD 480, which was later extended west to Hillsboro, were assigned to the new road and MD 312 replaced MD 480 on Central Avenue.

== Junction list ==
The entire route is in Caroline County.

Location	mi	km	Destinations	Notes
	0.00	0.00	MD 404 (Shore Highway) / Log Cabin Road south – Denton, Queen Anne	Superstreet intersection; southern terminus
Ridgely	1.42	2.29	MD 480 west (Ridgely Road) – Hillsboro	South end of concurrency with MD 480
Ridgely	1.82	2.93	MD 776 north (Sunset Boulevard)	Southern terminus of MD 776
Ridgely	2.30	3.70	MD 480 east (Sixth Street) / Central Avenue south – Greensboro	MD 312 turns north onto Central Avenue; north end of concurrency with MD 480
Ridgely	2.71	4.36	MD 776 south (Railroad Avenue) / Railroad Avenue east	Northern terminus of MD 776
Bridgetown	9.09	14.63	MD 304 west (Bridgetown Road) / Bridgetown Road east – Centreville	Eastern terminus of MD 304
Baltimore Corner	11.41	18.36	MD 313 (Goldsboro Road) – Ingleside, Goldsboro	Northern terminus
1.000 mi = 1.609 km; 1.000 km = 0.621 mi: Concurrency terminus
