= List of botanical gardens and arboretums in Maryland =

This list of botanical gardens and arboretums in Maryland is intended to include all significant botanical gardens and arboretums in the U.S. state of Maryland

Name	Image	Affiliation	City
Adkins Arboretum		Tuckahoe State Park	Ridgely
Brookside Gardens		Maryland-National Capital Park and Planning Commission	Wheaton
Cylburn Arboretum		City of Baltimore Recreation and Parks Department	Baltimore
Historic London Town and Gardens			Edgewater
Ladew Topiary Gardens			Monkton
McCrillis Gardens		Maryland-National Capital Park and Planning Commission	Bethesda
Howard Peters Rawlings Conservatory and Botanic Gardens of Baltimore		City of Baltimore Recreation and Parks Department	Baltimore
Salisbury University Arboretum		Salisbury University	Salisbury
Helen Avalynne Tawes Garden		Maryland Park Service	Annapolis
University of Maryland Arboretum & Botanical Garden		University of Maryland	College Park

== See also ==
- List of botanical gardens and arboretums in the United States
