= Nanticoke =

Nanticoke may refer to:

== Nanticoke people ==
- Nanticoke people, a Native American tribe originating in Delaware, United States
- Nanticoke language, an Algonquian language
- Nanticoke Indian Association, a state-recognized tribe in Delaware
- Nanticoke Lenni-Lenape Tribal Nation, a state-recognized tribe in New Jersey

== Buildings and structures ==
- Nanticoke Generating Station, a coal-fired power plant active in 1972–2013 in Nanticoke, Ontario; formerly the largest coal-fired power plant in North America
- Nanticoke Solar Facility, a solar power station built on the site of the former Nanticoke Generating Station
- Nanticoke Refinery, an oil refinery in Nanticoke, Ontario
- Nanticoke Lodge No. 172, A.F. and A.M., a building in Federalsburg, Maryland, built in 1919

== Ships ==
- Nanticoke (YTB-803), a United States Navy tug launched in 1969
- USS Nanticoke (AOG-66), a United States Navy tanker launched in 1945

== People ==
- Tehoka Nanticoke (born 1998), a professional lacrosse player

== Places ==
=== Canada ===
- Nanticoke, Ontario, a settlement
- Nanticoke Creek (Ontario), near Nanticoke, Ontario

=== United States ===
- Nanticoke Creek, in Pennsylvania
- Nanticoke River, in Delaware and Maryland
  - Nanticoke River Wildlife Management Area, in Maryland, located near the Nanticoke River
  - Nanticoke Wildlife Area, in Delaware, located near the Nanticoke River
- Nanticoke Hundred, an unincorporated subdivision of Sussex County, Delaware
- Nanticoke, Maryland, an unincorporated community
- Nanticoke, New York, a town
- Nanticoke, Pennsylvania, a city
- Nanticoke Acres, Maryland, an unincorporated community
- West Nanticoke, Pennsylvania, a census-designated place
