= Chambers Park Log Cabin =

Historic house in Maryland, United States

- U.S. National Register of Historic Places
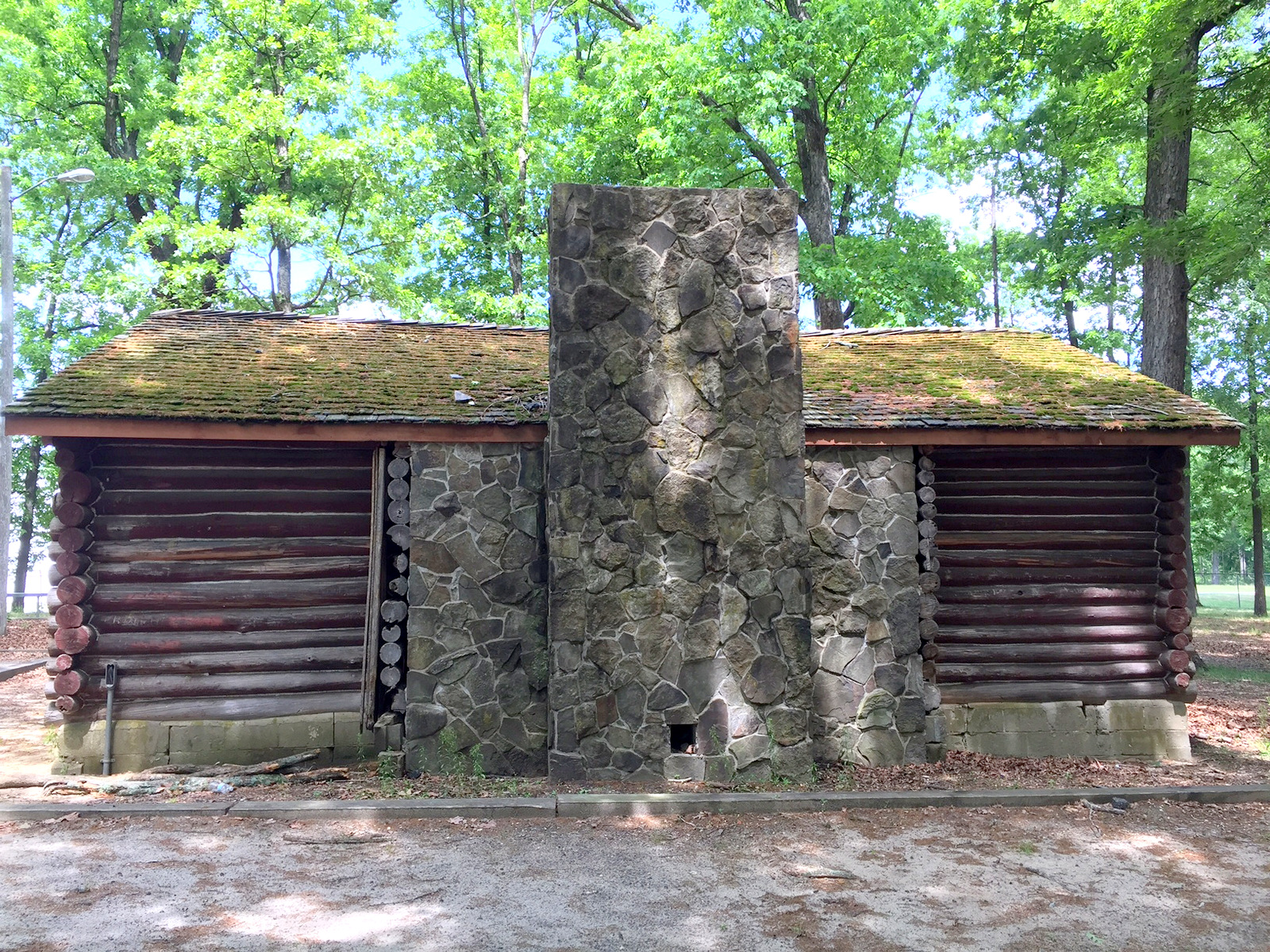

- Location within Maryland Location within the United States
- Location: Chambers Park; Federalsburg, Maryland
- Coordinates: 38°41′37″N 75°45′42″W
- Area: less than one acre
- Built: 1936
- Architectural style: New Deal
- NRHP reference No.: 16000408
- Added to NRHP: June 28, 2016

The Chambers Park Log Cabin is a historic structure in Chambers Park, Federalsburg, Maryland. It is a single-story log structure with a gabled roof covered in original wooden shingles layered over with asphalt shingles. It has a stone chimney at one end, which replaced a brick one in 1993. The cabin was built in 1936 by a crew funded by the National Youth Administration, a New Deal jobs program. It is one of the few surviving New Deal constructions on Maryland's Eastern Shore.

The cabin was listed on the National Register of Historic Places in 2016.

== See also ==
- National Register of Historic Places listings in Caroline County, Maryland
