= Gooden Airpark =

Airport near Ridgely, Maryland, US

- IATA: none; ICAO: KRJD; FAA LID: RJD

Summary
- Owner: AIR-LAND LLC
- Operator: John Gooden
- Serves: Ridgely, Maryland
- Built: November 1966
- Elevation AMSL: 64 ft / 20 m
- Coordinates: 38°58′14″N 075°52′05″W

Map
- Location of airport in Maryland

Runways
Direction	Length		Surface
Direction	ft	m	Surface
12-30	3,214	980	Asphalt

Statistics (2015)
- 34 aircraft based on field

Gooden Airpark (formerly Ridgely Airpark) (ICAO: KRJD, FAA LID: RJD) is an airport located 2 miles (3 km) northeast of Ridgely, Maryland, United States.

== See also ==
- List of airports in Maryland
