= Maryland Route 480 =

State highway in Maryland, United States

Maryland Route 480
- Maryland Route 480 highlighted in red

Route information
- Maintained by MDSHA
- Length: 9.08 mi (14.61 km)
- Existed: 1933–present
- Tourist routes: Harriet Tubman Underground Railroad Byway

Major junctions
- West end: MD 404 in Hillsboro
- MD 312 in Ridgely; MD 314 in Greensboro
- East end: MD 313 in Greensboro

Location
- Country: United States
- State: Maryland
- Counties: Caroline

Highway system
- Maryland highway system; Interstate; US; State; Scenic Byways
← MD 478	→ MD 481

Maryland Route 480 (MD 480) is a state highway in the U.S. state of Maryland. Known for most of its length as Ridgely Road, the state highway runs 9.08 miles (14.61 km) from MD 404 in Hillsboro east to MD 313 in Greensboro. MD 480 passes through Ridgely, where it has a concurrency with MD 312. The state highway was constructed between Ridgely and Greensboro in the early 1930s. MD 480 was rerouted in both towns in the early 1950s before being extended west to Hillsboro in the late 1950s. According to Backroads and Byways of Chesapeake Bay, Drives, Day Trips & Weekend Excursions, Leslie Atkins. MD 480 follows St. Joan's Path which was originally an ancient Native Americans trail used by both Choptank and Naticoke tribes.

== Route description ==
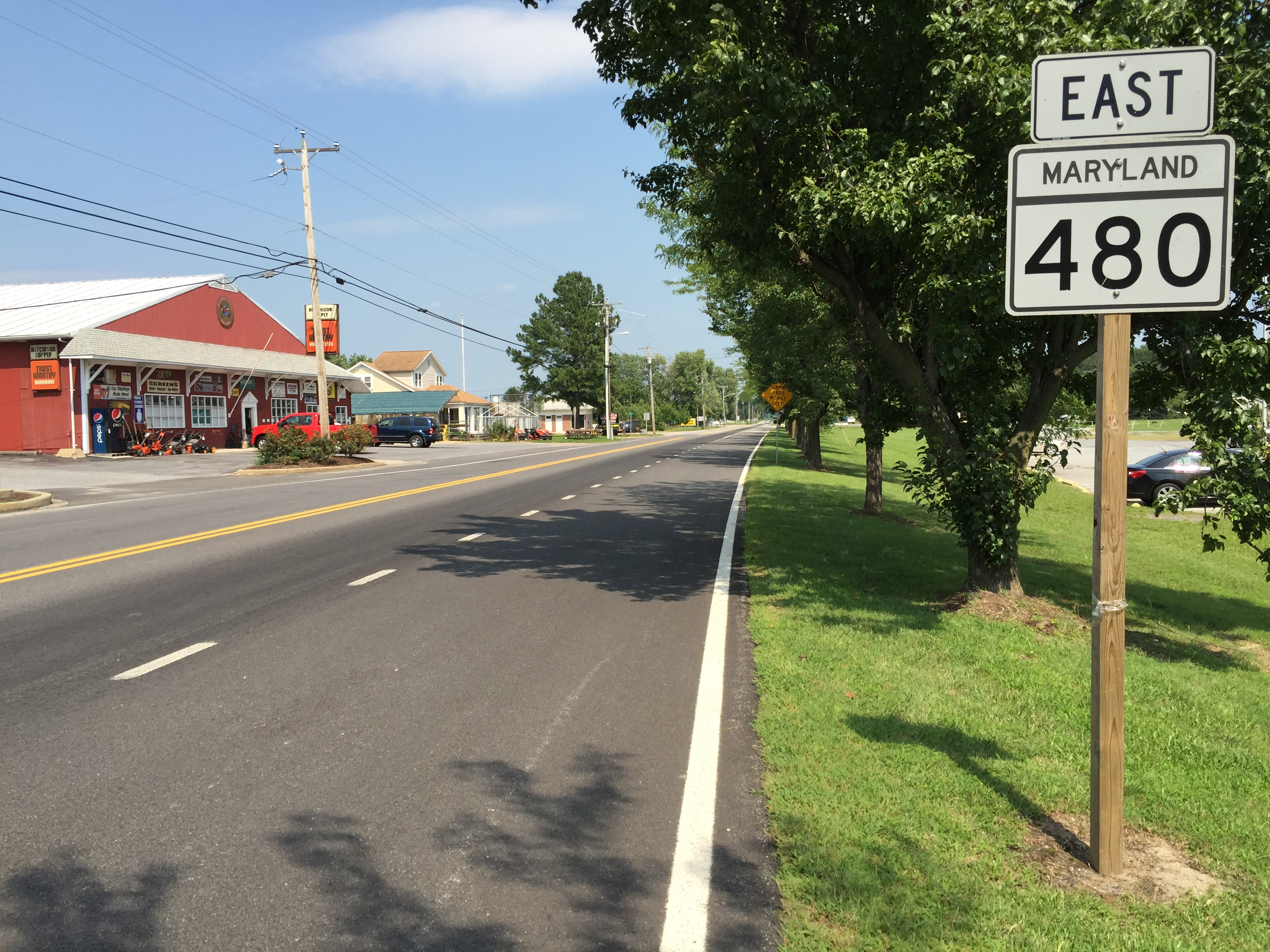
View east along MD 480 at MD 312 in Ridgely

MD 480 begins at an intersection with MD 404 in Hillsboro. Ridgely Road continues south toward the center of Hillsboro. MD 480 heads northeast as a two-lane undivided road through farmland until it meets MD 312 (Downes Station Road) on the outskirts of Ridgely. The two state highways continue northeast, with MD 776 (Sunset Boulevard) splitting to the north immediately before the road enters the town limits of Ridgely, where its name temporarily changes to Sixth Street and the highway passes south of Martin Sutton Memorial Park. The concurrency of MD 480 and MD 312 ends where the latter highway heads north into the center of town on Central Avenue. MD 480 heads east out of town, continuing straight through farmland. After traversing Forge Branch, the state highway veers to the northeast, paralleling the Choptank River at a distance until the highway enters Greensboro, where its name changes again to Main Street. MD 480 intersects MD 314 (Sunset Avenue) in the center of the town. The state highway traverses an S-curve and passes east of Greensboro Elementary School before reaching its northern terminus at MD 313 (Greensboro Road).

== History ==
MD 480 was under construction from Ridgely to Greensboro by 1932 and completed in 1933. The state highway originally followed Central Avenue in Ridgely south from MD 312, then turned east onto Sixth Street toward Greensboro. In Greensboro, MD 480 had its eastern terminus at present-day MD 314. MD 480 north to its present eastern terminus and MD 314 east across the Choptank River were originally part of MD 313. When MD 313 bypassed Greensboro in 1950, MD 480 was extended north through Greensboro to its present terminus. When the Ridgely Cutoff was completed in 1953, MD 312 replaced MD 480 on Central Avenue. MD 480's western terminus was the intersection of Central Avenue and Sixth Street until MD 480 was extended west to MD 404 in Hillsboro in 1959.

== Junction list ==
The entire route is in Caroline County.

Location	mi	km	Destinations	Notes
Hillsboro	0.00	0.00	MD 404 (Shore Highway) / Ridgely Road south – Denton, Wye Mills	Western terminus
Ridgely	2.50	4.02	MD 312 south (Downes Station Road) – Denton	West end of concurrency with MD 312
Ridgely	2.90	4.67	MD 776 north (Sunset Boulevard)	Southern terminus of MD 776
Ridgely	3.38	5.44	MD 312 north (Central Avenue) / Central Avenue south – Ridgely	East end of concurrency with MD 312
Greensboro	8.21	13.21	MD 314 (Sunset Avenue) – Whiteleysburg	
Greensboro	9.08	14.61	MD 313 (Greensboro Road) to MD 314 – Goldsboro, Denton	Eastern terminus
1.000 mi = 1.609 km; 1.000 km = 0.621 mi: Concurrency terminus
