= Federalsburg West Historic District =

Historic district in Maryland, United States

- U.S. National Register of Historic Places
- U.S. Historic district
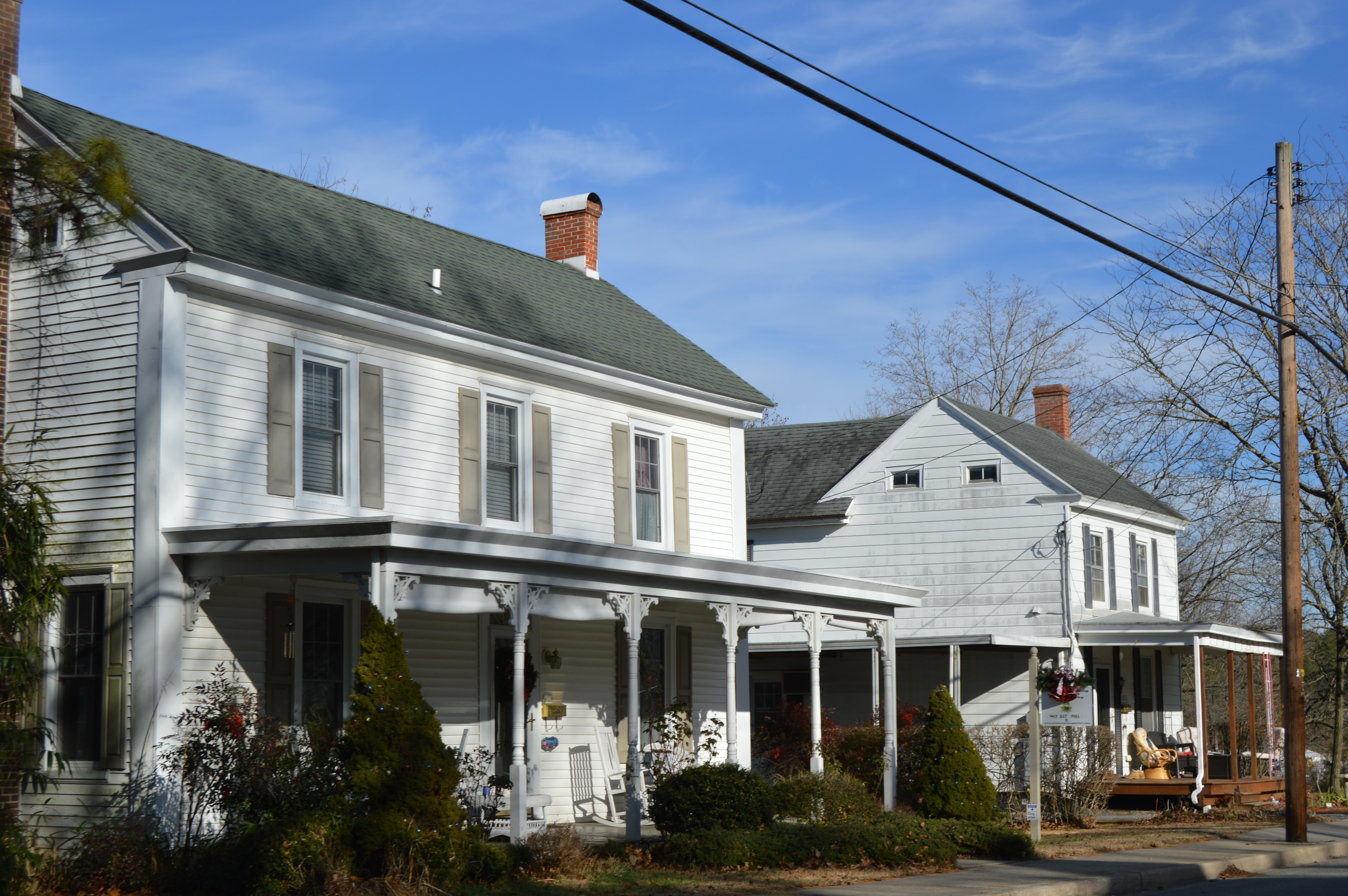

- Location within Maryland Location within the United States
- Location: Roughly bounded by Railroad, University & Bloomingdale Aves., Denton & Idlewild Rds. & Marshyhope Creek, Federalsburg, Maryland
- Coordinates: 38°41′55″N 75°46′49″W
- Area: 200 acres (81 ha)
- NRHP reference No.: 16000250
- Added to NRHP: May 12, 2016

The Federalsburg West Historic District encompasses a portion of the downtown area of the city of Federalsburg, Maryland. Centered at the junction of Main Street and Central Avenue, it extends north along Main Street to beyond Park Lane, and south to the railroad tracks. It also extends along Park Lane and West Central Avenue. The area is predominantly residential, its roads laid out during the early period of the city's growth, and reflect the period of the city's greatest growth, between the mid-19th and early 20th centuries. Prominent non-residential buildings include the 1901 Methodist Church, and the Federalsburg Railroad Station.

The district was listed on the National Register of Historic Places in 2016.

== See also ==
- National Register of Historic Places listings in Caroline County, Maryland
