= Baltimore Corner, Maryland =

Unincorporated community in Maryland, United States

- Populated place
- Location within Maryland Location within the United States
- Coordinates: 39°03′29″N 75°50′41″W
- Country: United States
- State: Maryland
- County: Caroline
- Elevation: 56 ft (17 m)
- GNIS feature ID: 589688

Baltimore Corner is a populated place on the Eastern Shore of Maryland, in Caroline County, Maryland, United States. It is near the Queen Anne's County line at the intersection of Maryland routes 312 and 313. It is not to be confused with Baltimore, located on the opposite shore of the Chesapeake Bay.

The crossroads is so named because of its position on the route to Baltimore locals often used prior to the construction of the Chesapeake Bay Bridge.
