= West Denton Warehouse-Wharf =

- West Denton Warehouse--Wharf
- U.S. National Register of Historic Places
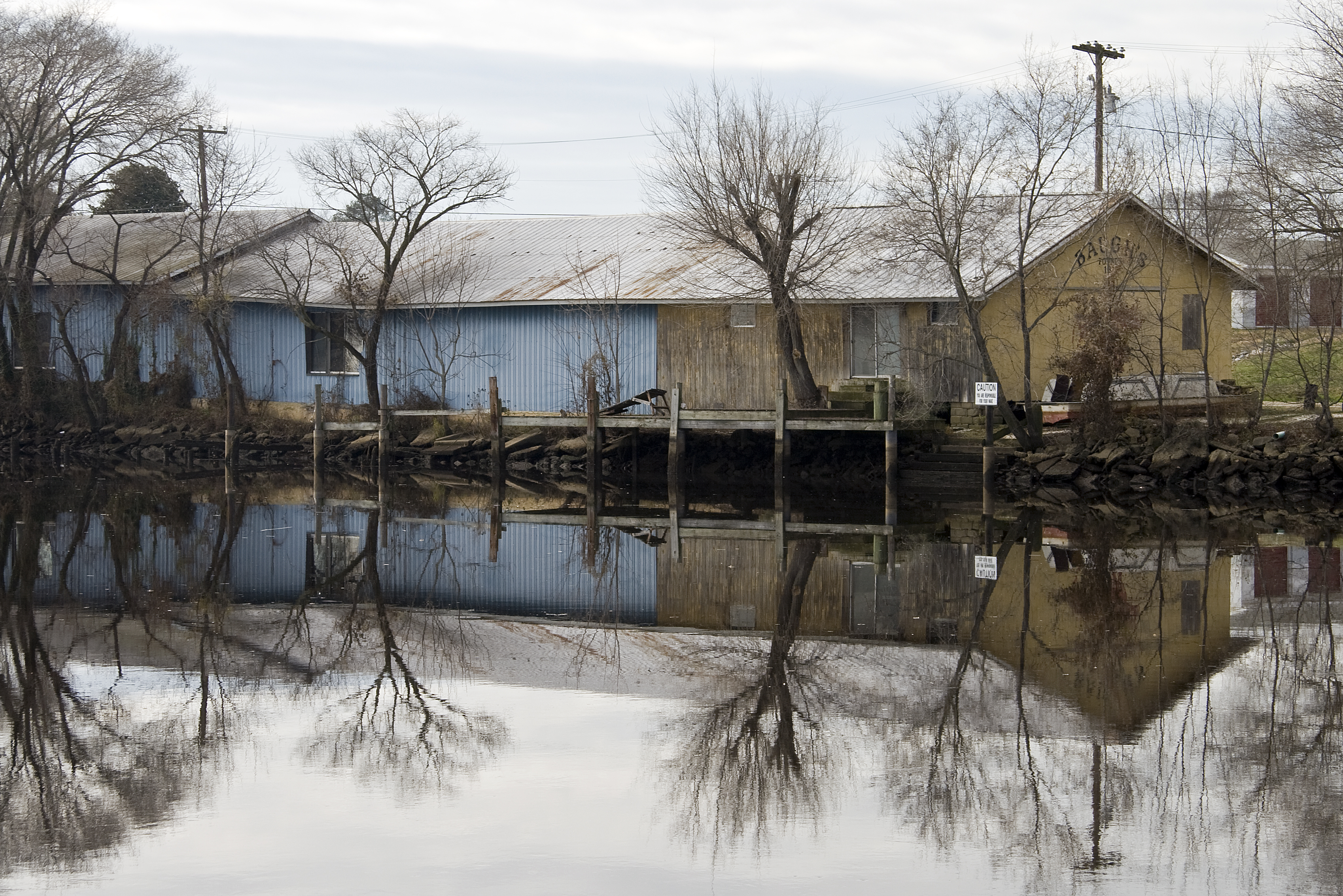

- Location within Maryland Location within the United States
- Location: 10215 River Landing Rd., West Denton, Maryland
- Coordinates: 38°53′18″N 75°50′23″W
- Area: 0.4 acres (0.16 ha)
- Built: 1850
- NRHP reference No.: 00001285
- Added to NRHP: November 15, 2000

West Denton Warehouse-Wharf is a historic warehouse located at West Denton, Caroline County, Maryland. It is an early-20th century timber-framed warehouse structure situated along the west bank of the upper Choptank River. The earliest section was built about 1850, and is the 40 foot x 100 foot center portion. The north (40 foot x 20 foot) and south (40 foot x 40 foot) additions were built in the 1940s. It is a representative example of a type of structure which served various functions in connection with waterborne commerce, and is one of only two remaining riverfront warehouses in Maryland.

The location is associated with the 1858 capture of Underground Railroad conductor Hugh Hazlett, who was transported on a steamboat from Denton to face trial in Cambridge.

It was listed on the National Register of Historic Places in 2000.

== Restoration ==
The Joppa wharf warehouse was restored and the wharf rebuilt. It became part of the National Park Service National Underground Railroad Network to Freedom.

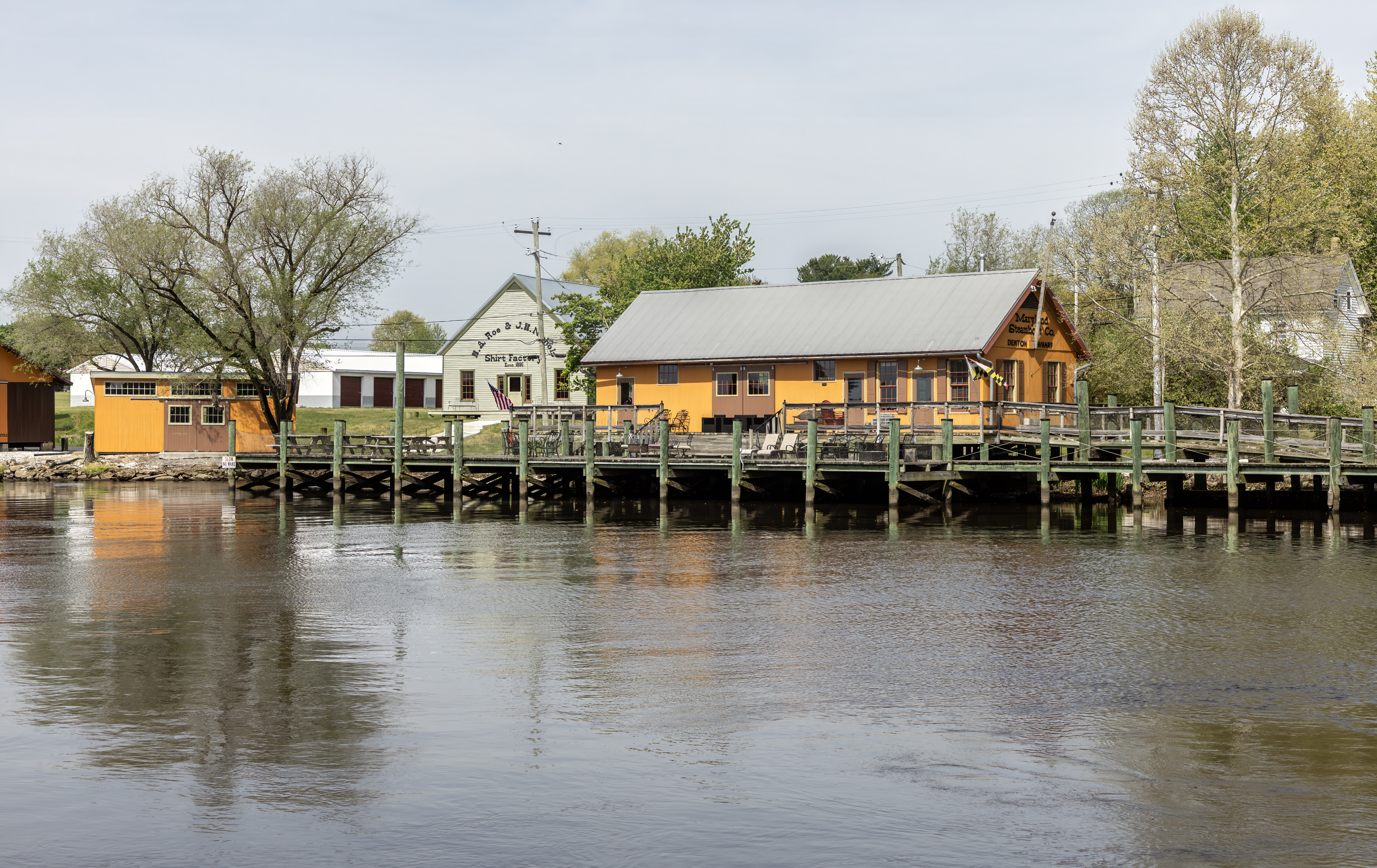
The wharf in 2026
