= Adkins Arboretum =

Garden in Ridgely, Maryland, United States

Coordinates: 38.953285°N 75.933444°W

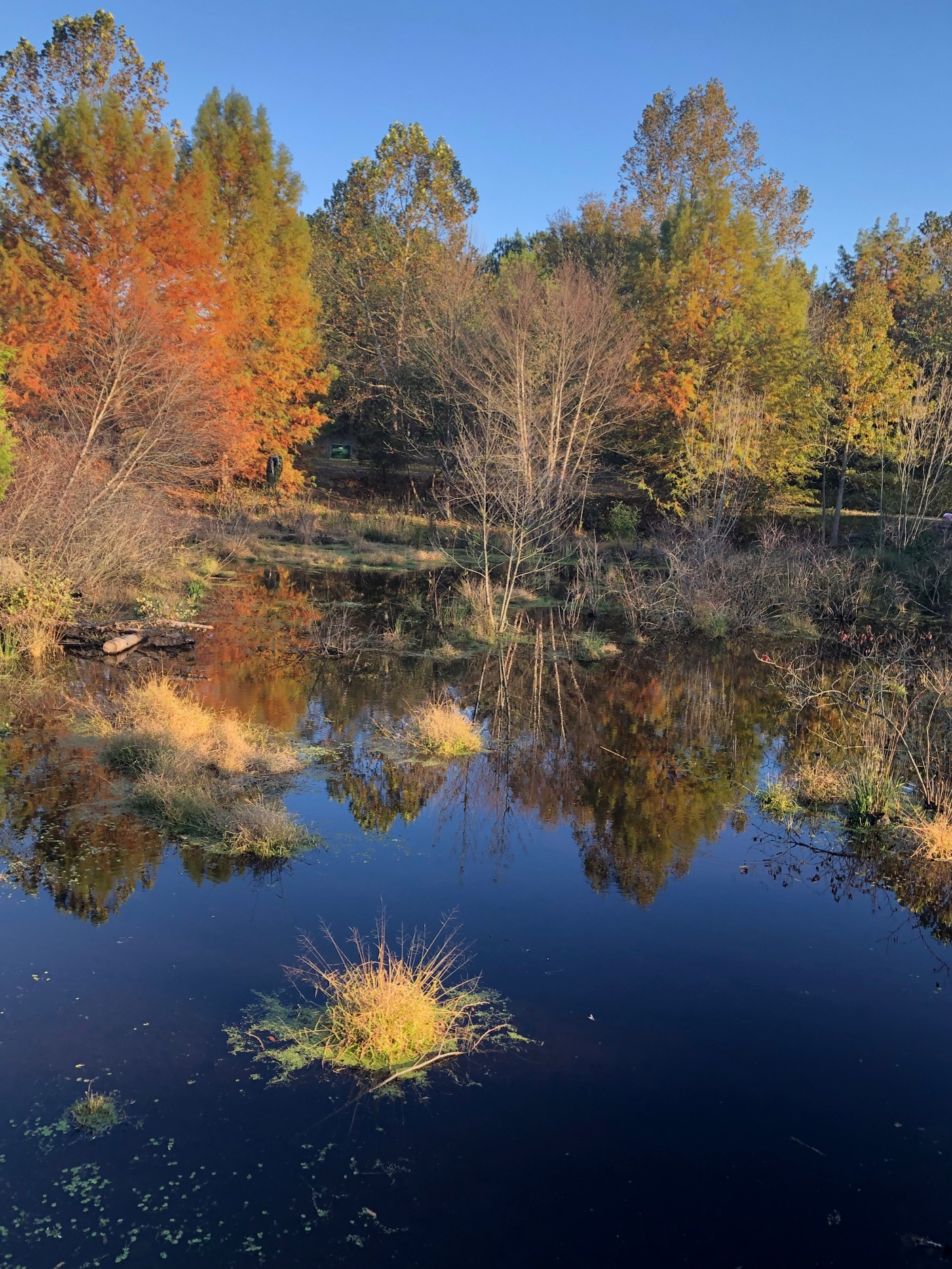
- Wetlands area of the arboretum.
- Interactive map of Adkins Arboretum
- Website: Official website

Adkins Arboretum is a 400-acre native garden and preserve located near Tuckahoe State Park at 12610 Eveland Road, Ridgely, Maryland. The grounds contain five miles of paths through meadows and native plant gardens on the Eastern Shore of Maryland. Its gardens contain a "living collection" of more than 600 species of native shrubs, trees, wildflowers and grasses, used to promote land stewardship practices in the Chesapeake Bay region.

== History ==
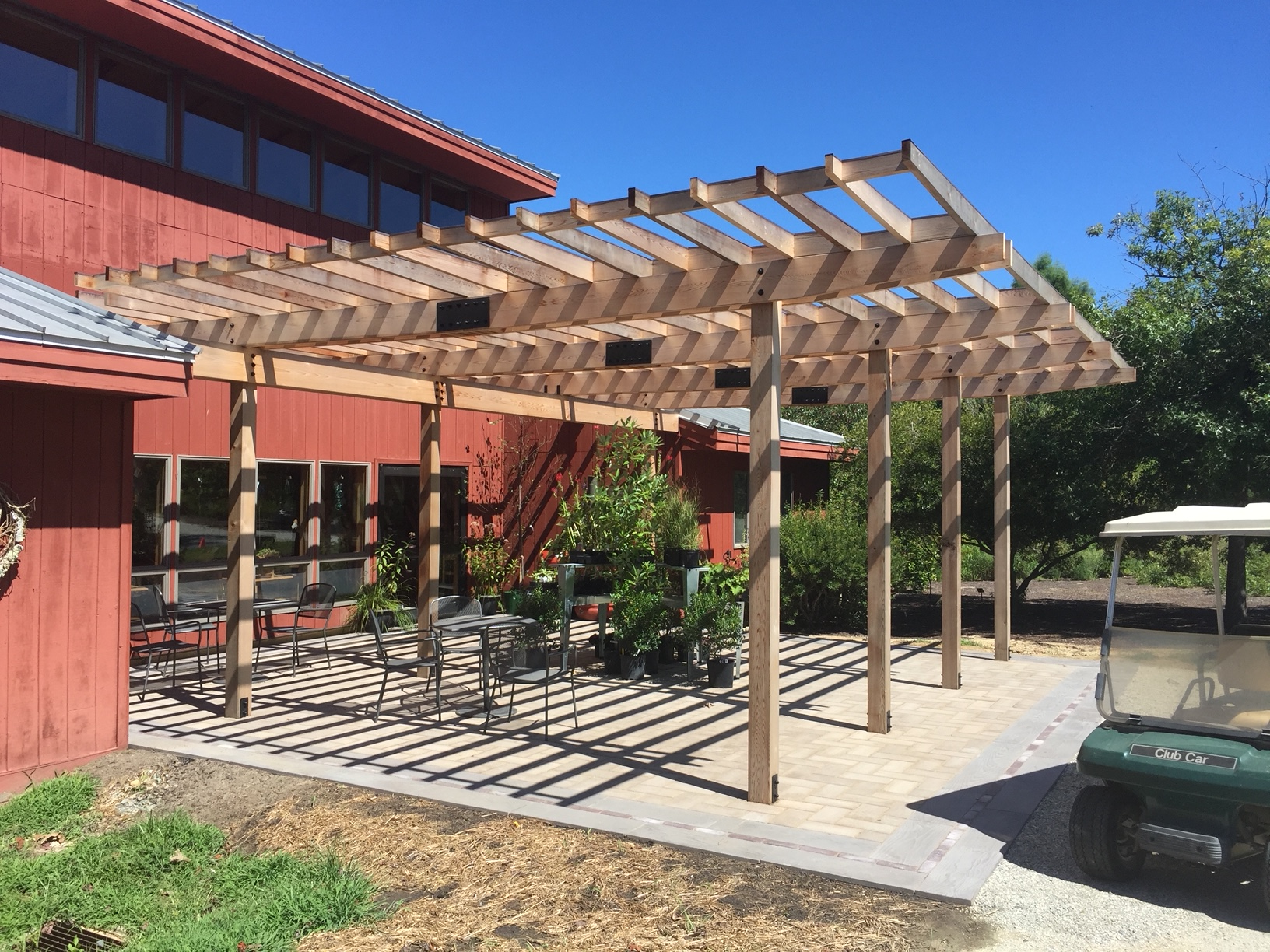
Rear patio and Pergola of the Adkins Arboretum Visitor Center

The arboretum was originally established in 1972 to be the Maryland state arboretum on the grounds of Tuckahoe State Park. It first opened in the 1980s as a result of a major donation from Leon Andrus, a native of Queen Anne's County. The arboretum derives its name from the Adkins family, an Eastern Shore family of conservationists who were friends with Andrus. When Andrus died in 1989, he left a bequest to the arboretum's endowment.

Its original mission was to display all of Maryland's forest types; however, in the 1990s, its mission was revised to emphasize the display and study of the Delmarva Peninsula's indigenous plant communities. In 1998, its operations were converted to a public/private partnership, with Maryland granting a 50-year lease to the Friends of Adkins Arboretum. The arboretum is supported by grants and donations.

== See also ==
- List of botanical gardens in the United States
