= Denton Schoolhouse =

- U.S. National Register of Historic Places
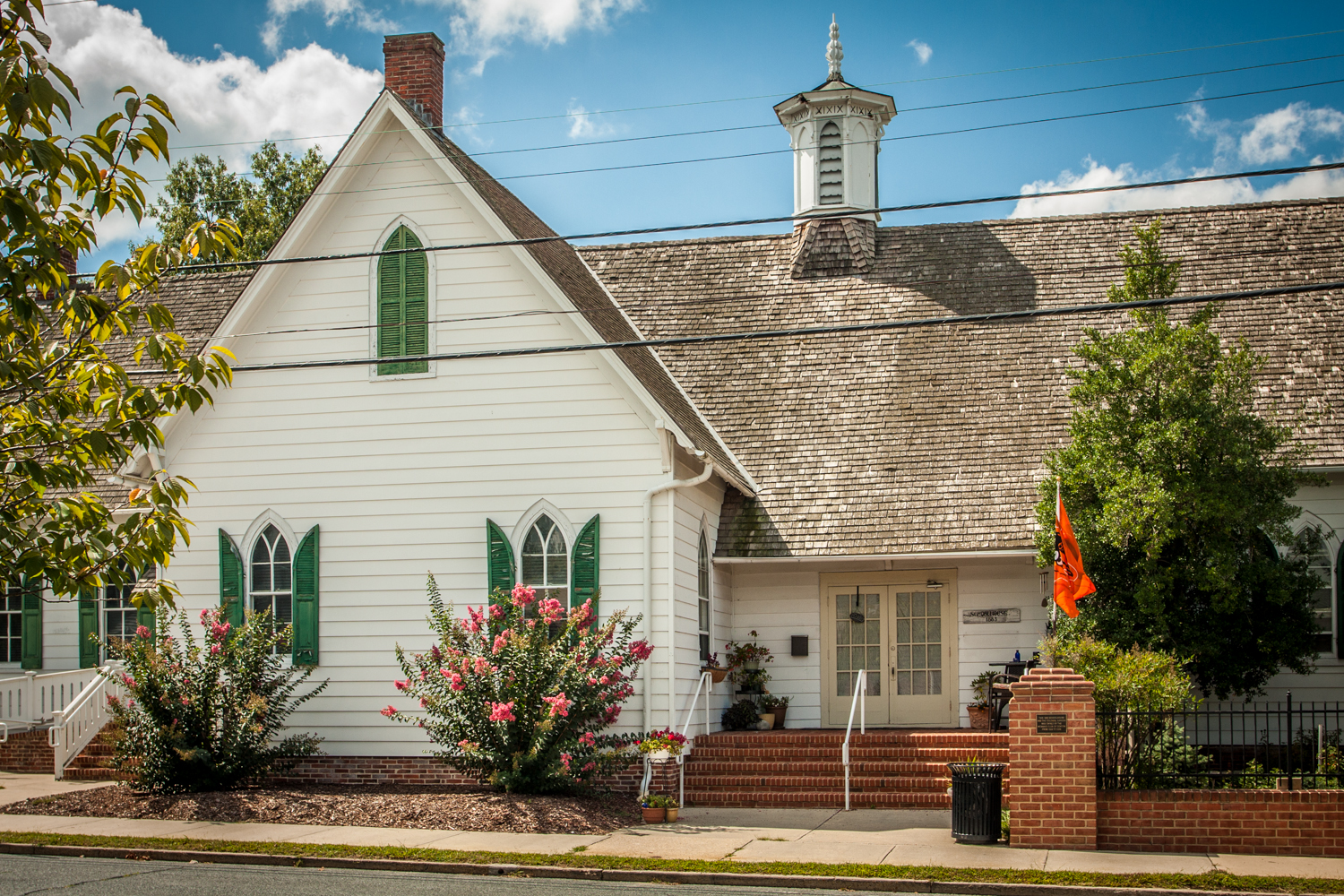

- Location within Maryland Location within the United States
- Location: 104 S. 2nd St., Denton, Maryland
- Coordinates: 38°53′7″N 75°50′2″W
- Area: 0.5 acres (0.20 ha)
- Built: 1883
- Architectural style: Gothic Revival
- NRHP reference No.: 78001447
- Added to NRHP: April 19, 1978

The Denton Schoolhouse is a historic school located at Denton, Caroline County, Maryland, United States. It is a small building with a Latin cross plan and several features of the Gothic Revival style, built about 1883. On the roof ridge is an octagonal cupola with a belfry of alternating louvered and plain drop-arched panels, with a cut wooden spire on top.

The Denton Schoolhouse was listed on the National Register of Historic Places in 1978.
