= Denton Armory =

- U.S. National Register of Historic Places
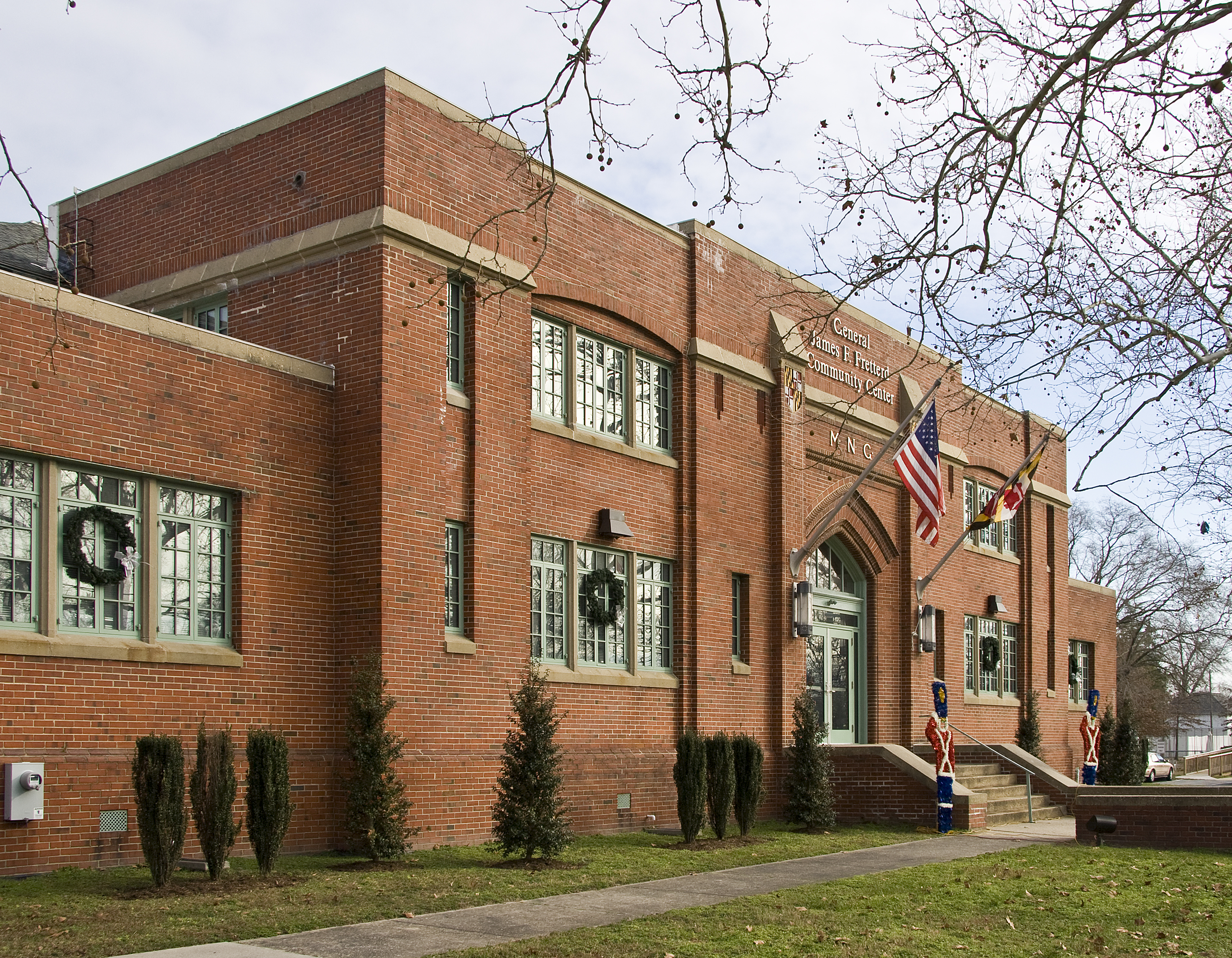
- Denton Armory, December 2011

- Location within Maryland Location within the United States
- Location: Maple Ave. & Randolph St., Denton, Maryland
- Coordinates: 38°53′2″N 75°49′53″W
- Area: less than one acre
- Built: 1938
- Built by: Carlstrand Engineering Co.
- Architectural style: Gothic Revival, PWA Moderne
- MPS: Maryland National Guard Armories TR
- NRHP reference No.: 85002665
- Added to NRHP: September 25, 1985

The Denton Armory is a historic armory located at Denton, Caroline County, Maryland.

== Description ==
It is a two-story brick structure with a full basement, completed in 1938. Its basic structure was designed in the PWA Moderne style, with numerous historicist Gothic Revival architectural elements.

It is important for its association with the reorganization and expansion of the U.S. National Guard system in the 20th century.

It currently houses the General James F. Fretterd Community Center of Caroline County, used for county-sponsored services including the county Recreation and Parks Department staff headquarters, and is also available by reservation for community events.

=== Landmark ===
The Denton Armory was listed on the National Register of Historic Places in 1985.
