= Brick House Farm =

Historic house in Maryland

- U.S. National Register of Historic Places
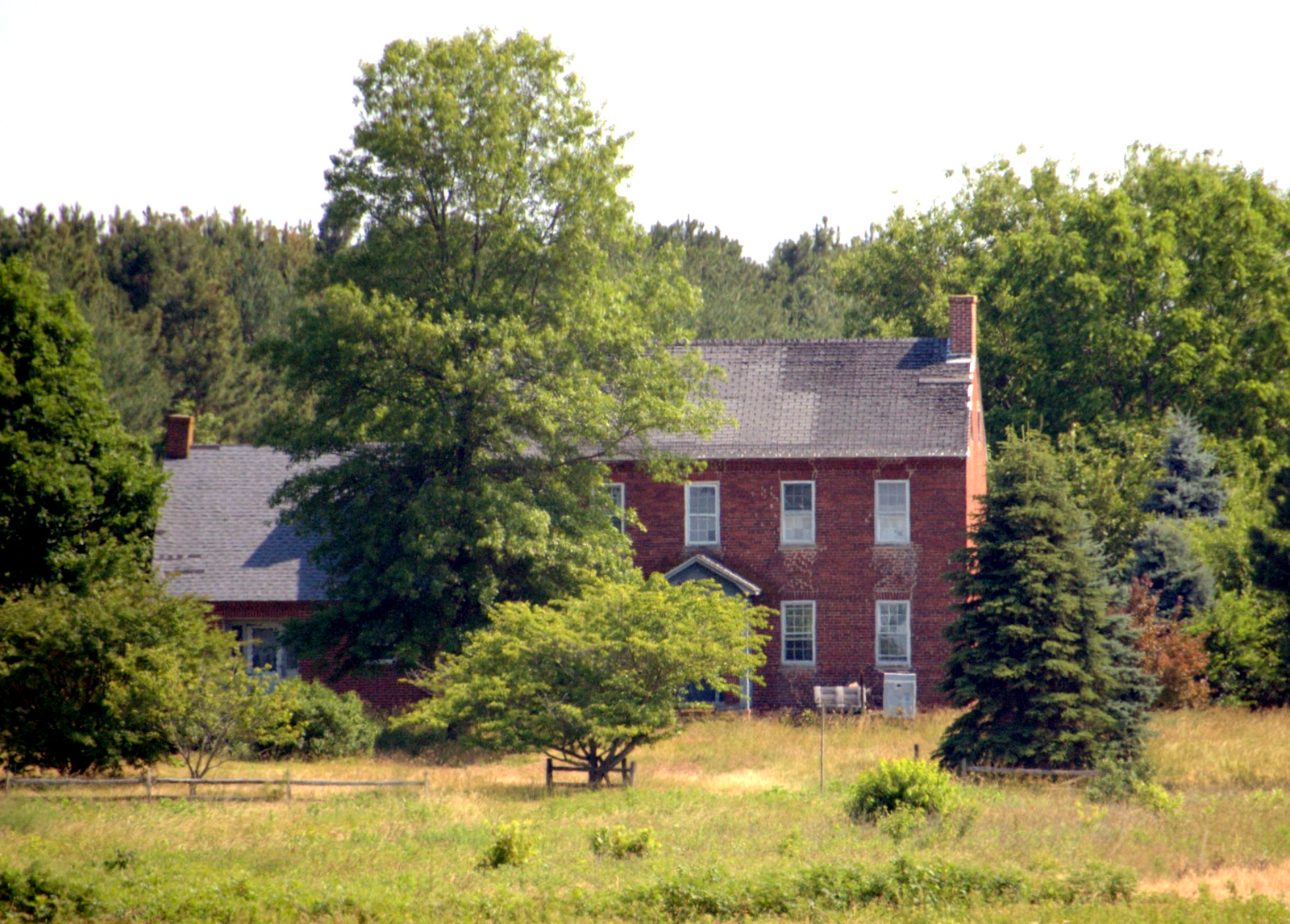

- Location within Maryland Location within the United States
- Nearest city: 24870 E. Cherry Ln. Greensboro, Maryland
- Coordinates: 39°0′38.13″N 75°50′20.89″W
- Area: 8.7 acres (3.5 ha)
- Built: 1823
- Architectural style: Federal
- NRHP reference No.: 09000963
- Added to NRHP: December 2, 2009

Brick House Farm, also known as the Richard Jarrell Farmhouse, is a historic home in Greensboro in Caroline County, Maryland, United States. It was built about 1823 and is a five-bay-long, two-story brick “I” house with a kitchen addition dating to the 1970s. The main house measures 41 feet 8 inches (12.70 m) long by 20 feet 1 inch (6.12 m) deep. It is one room deep and features a gable roof. The perimeter of the estate is wooded by pine and cherry trees. A small orchard is located at the front of the property. The remaining barn and chicken coop lays behind the house. The house is full of intricate wood work and features several rooms on each floor. The stairs continue up to the attic which goes above the entire house and one can stand up without having to duck.

It was listed on the National Register of Historic Places in 2009.

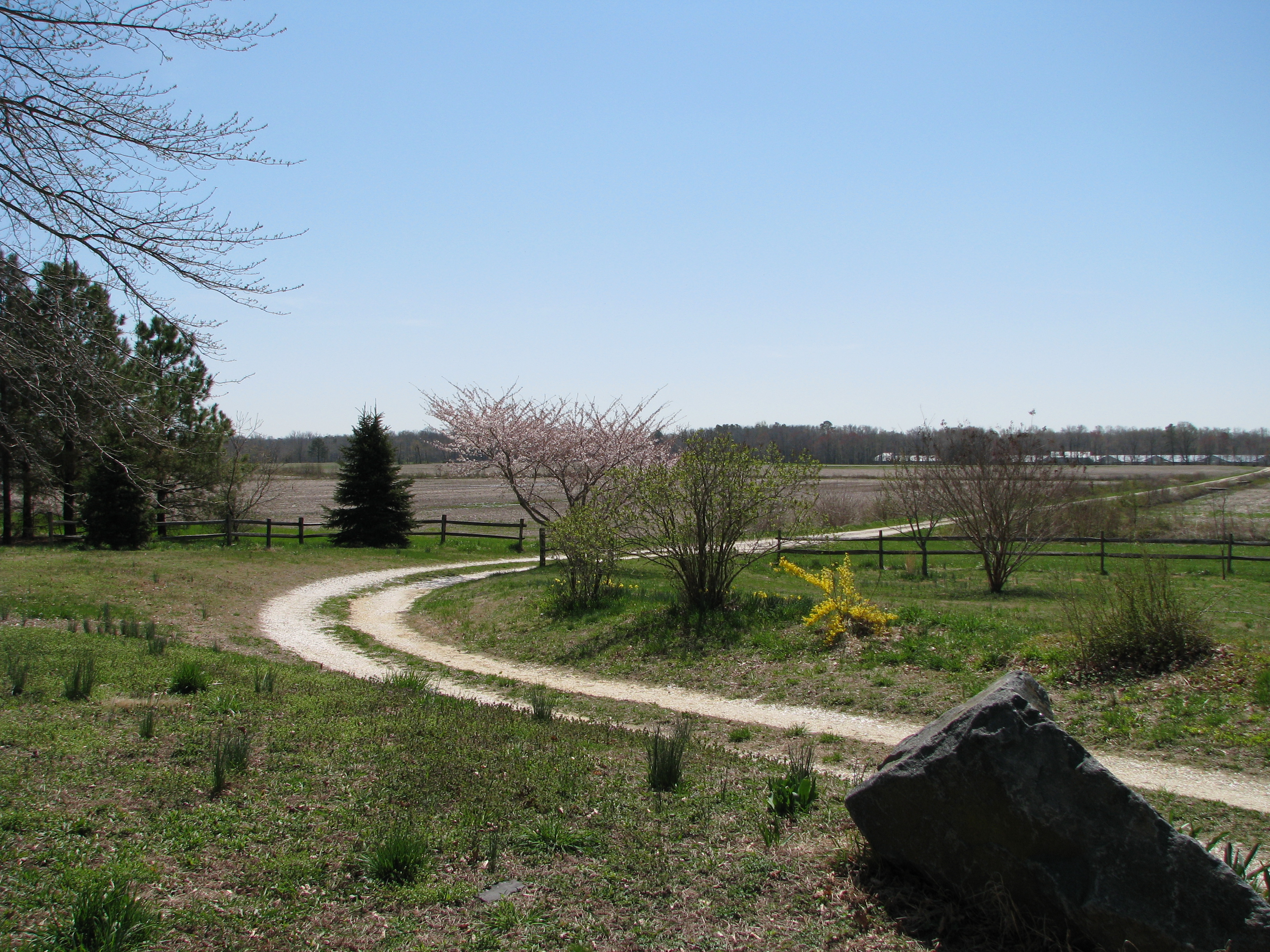
