= Willow Grove (Greensboro, Maryland) =

Historic house in Maryland, United States

- U.S. National Register of Historic Places
- Location within Maryland Location within the United States
- Location: Maryland Route 457 off Maryland Route 213, Greensboro, Maryland
- Coordinates: 38°55′34″N 75°46′28″W
- Area: 25 acres (10 ha)
- Architectural style: Georgian
- NRHP reference No.: 72000573
- Added to NRHP: June 13, 1972

Willow Grove is a historic home located at Greensboro, Caroline County, Maryland, United States. It is one of the few Georgian-style houses in Caroline County that were constructed between 1780 and 1790. It is a two-story brick house covered with a thin coat of stucco, measuring 37 feet long and 34 feet deep. It was built by Matthew Driver, Jr., who with three other members from Caroline County ratified the United States Constitution at the State Convention in 1788.

Willow Grove was listed on the National Register of Historic Places in 1972.
