= Nanticoke Lodge No. 172, A.F. and A.M. =

- U.S. National Register of Historic Places
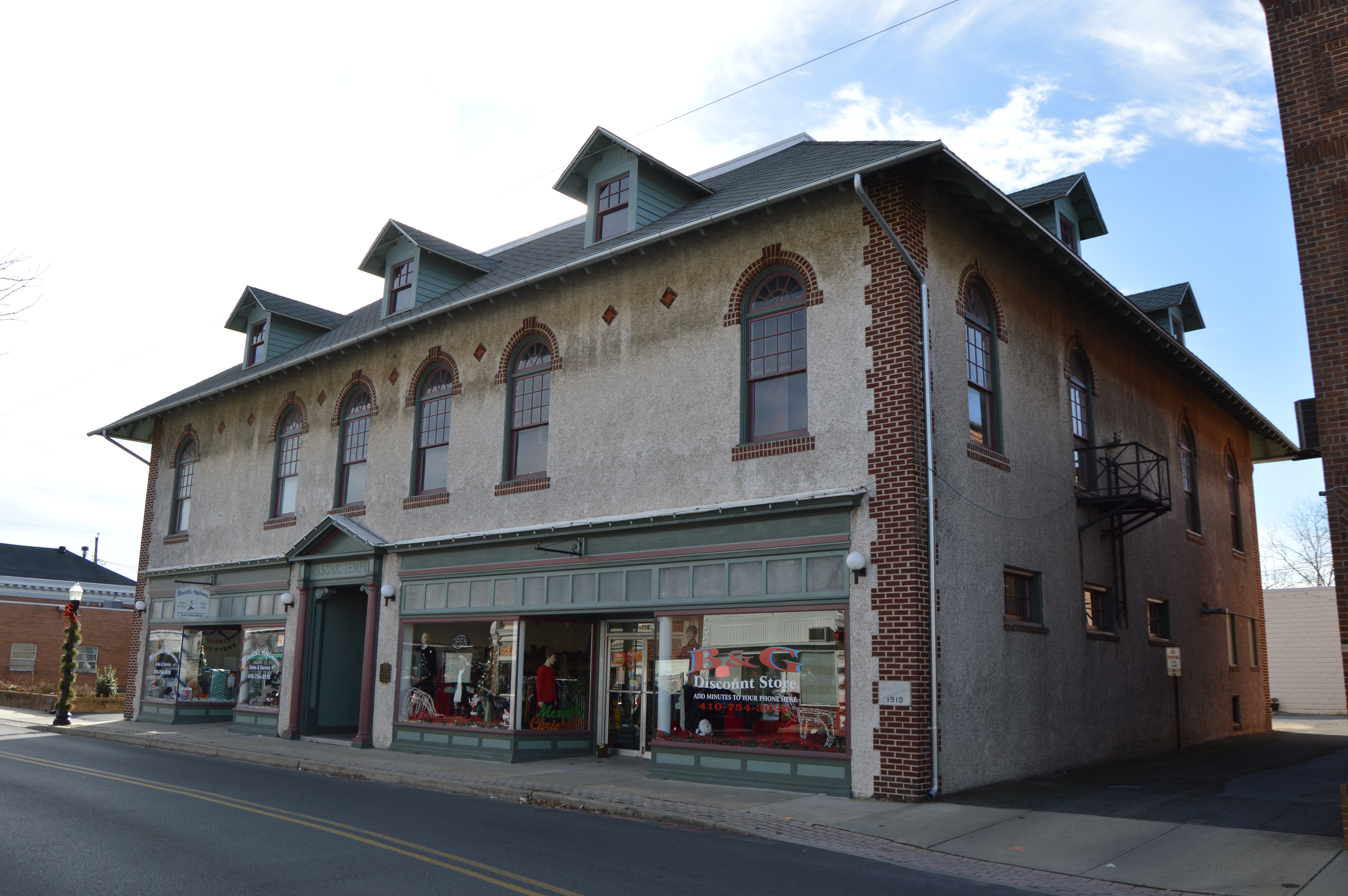
- Front of the lodge building

- Location within Maryland Location within the United States
- Location: 112-116 N. Main St., Federalsburg, Maryland
- Coordinates: 38°41′42″N 75°46′26″W
- NRHP reference No.: 14000270
- Added to NRHP: June 2, 2014

The Nanticoke Lodge No. 172, A.F. and A.M. is a historic mixed-use commercial building at 112-116 North Main Street in Federalsburg, Maryland. The two story terra cotta brick building was erected in 1919-20 by local Masonic groups. It housed retail operations on the first floor, and a large auditorium for lodge functions on the second. It is one of two surviving purpose-built Masonic buildings in Caroline County. Its upper floor lodge spaces have well-preserved period detailing.

The building was listed on the National Register of Historic Places in 2014.

== See also ==
- National Register of Historic Places listings in Caroline County, Maryland
