= Denton Historic District =

Historic district in Maryland, United States

- U.S. National Register of Historic Places
- U.S. Historic district
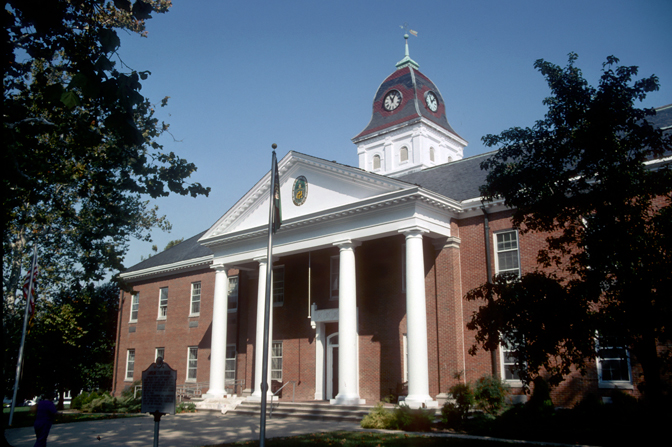
- Caroline County Courthouse, located in the district

- Location within Maryland Location within the United States
- Location: Roughly bounded by 1st, 10th, Gay, High, Franklin and Sunnyside Sts., Denton, Maryland
- Coordinates: 38°53′7″N 75°49′41″W
- Area: 200 acres (81 ha)
- Built: 1774
- Architect: Multiple
- Architectural style: Colonial Revival, Queen Anne
- NRHP reference No.: 83003738
- Added to NRHP: December 1, 1983

Denton Historic District is a national historic district in Denton, Caroline County, Maryland, United States. It is located on the flat land along the south bank of the Choptank River. The west end of the district focuses on the courthouse square, which was laid out in the 1790s, with its late 19th century courthouse building and square faced on all sides by noteworthy residences and commercial structures. The historic commercial district extends east of the square along Market Street. It comprises a notable collection of two-story brick storefronts and one-story concrete block commercial structures, with frame residences representing late-19th / early-20th century forms interspersed among them.

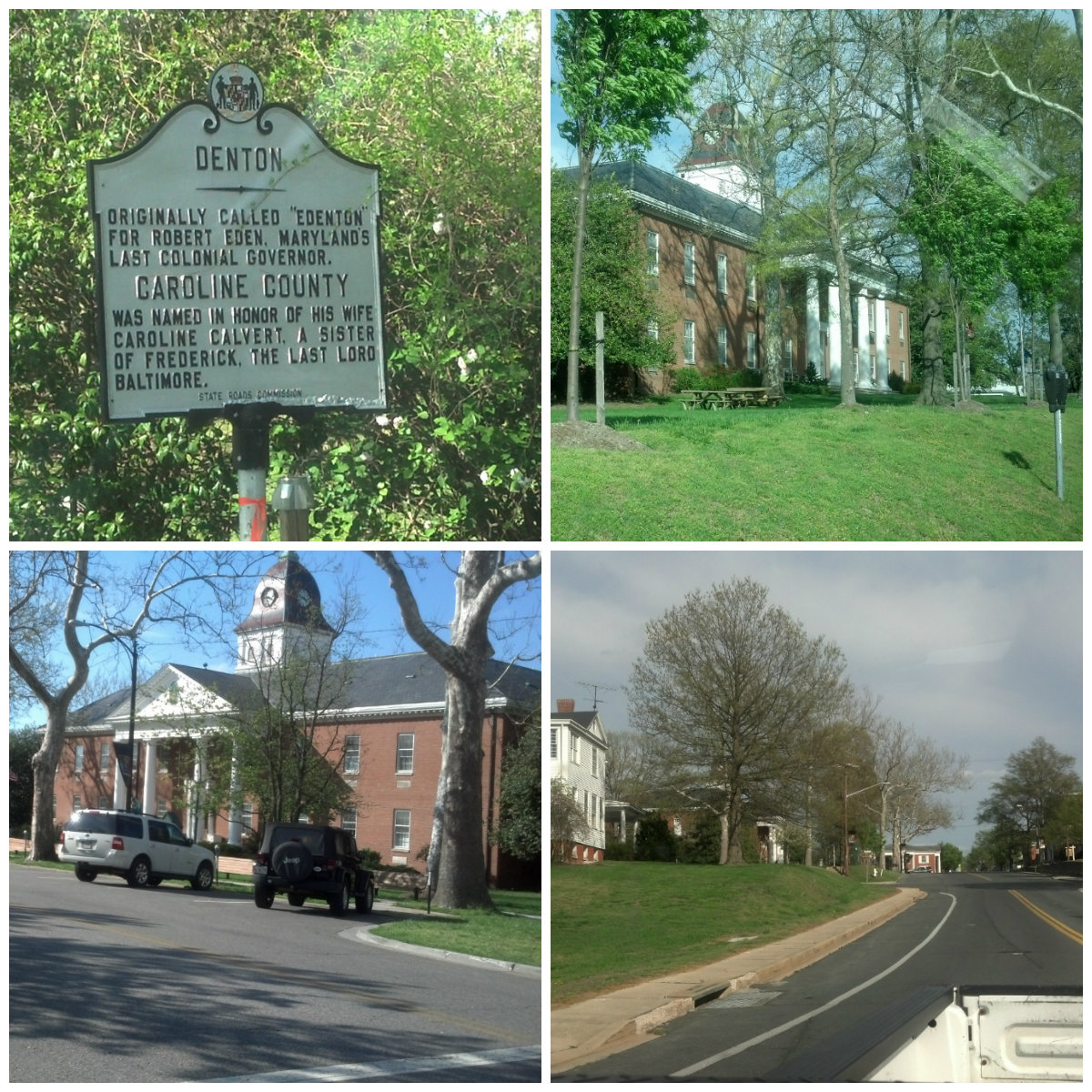
Historical Denton, Maryland

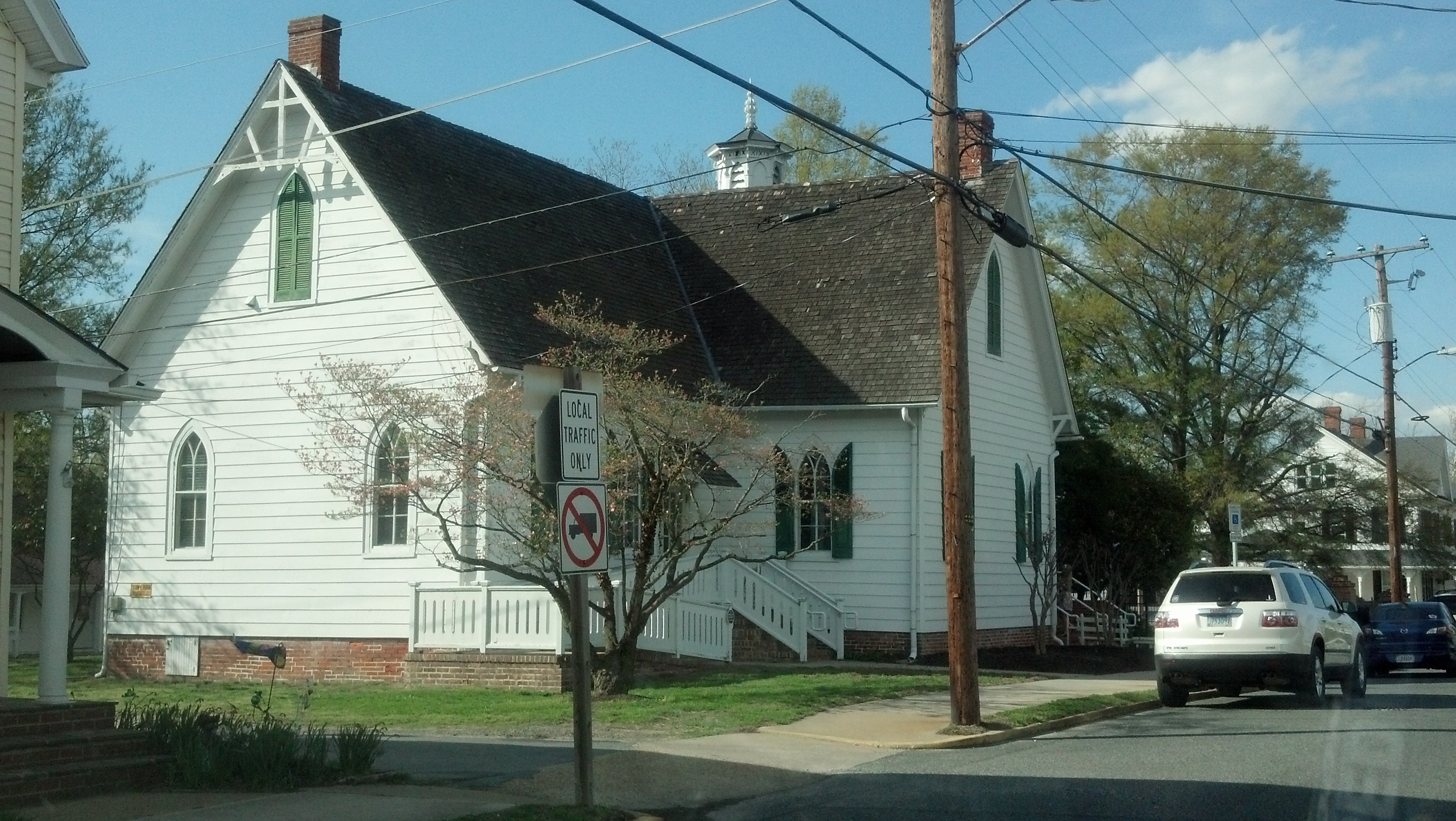
Denton's Historical School House

It was added to the National Register of Historic Places in 1983.
