= Oak Lawn (Ridgely, Maryland) =

Historic house in Maryland, United States

- U.S. National Register of Historic Places
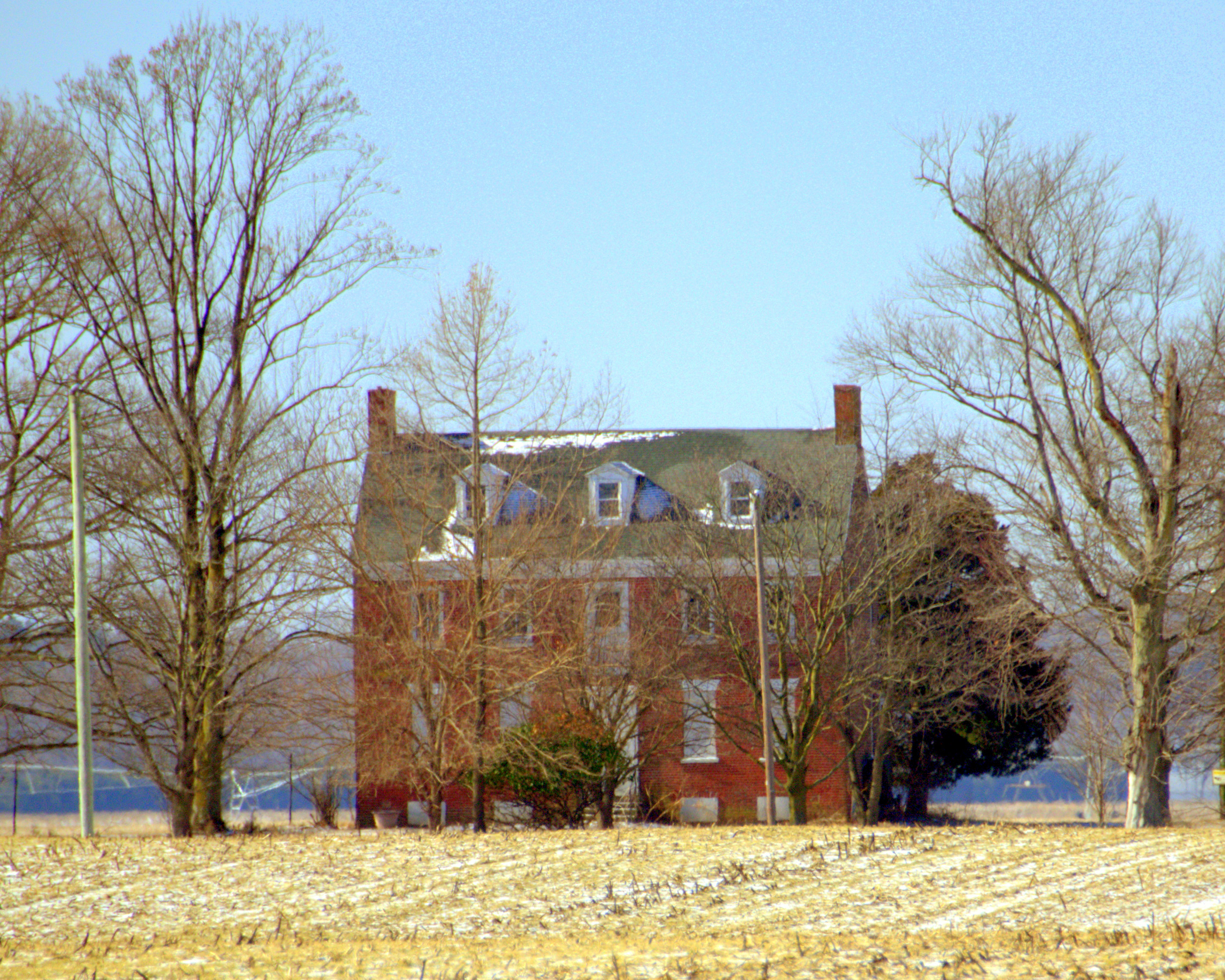

- Location within Maryland Location within the United States
- Location: 2.8 miles north of Ridgely on Maryland Route 312, Ridgely, Maryland
- Coordinates: 38°58′50″N 75°52′51″W
- Area: 72 acres (29 ha)
- Built: 1783
- Architectural style: Federal
- NRHP reference No.: 75000875
- Added to NRHP: May 28, 1975

Oak Lawn is a historic home located at Ridgely, Caroline County, Maryland, United States. It is a large rectangular 2 1/2-story brick structure with an arched brick colonnade connecting the two-story brick kitchen wing. The main house was erected in 1783 and the kitchen and arcade added before 1798. In the mid 19th century, it was owned by Greenbury Ridgely, the founder of the town of Ridgely.

Oak Lawn was listed on the National Register of Historic Places in 1975.
