= Daffin House =

Historic house in Maryland, United States

- U.S. National Register of Historic Places
- Location within Maryland Location within the United States
- Location: 3 miles south of Hillsboro on Deep Branch Rd., Hillsboro, Maryland
- Coordinates: 38°52′31″N 75°55′47″W
- Area: 82 acres (33 ha)
- Built: 1760
- Architectural style: Federal
- NRHP reference No.: 75000873
- Added to NRHP: October 21, 1975

Daffin House is a historic home located at Hillsboro, Caroline County, Maryland, United States. It is a large, 2½-story brick structure built about 1780. Attached is a two-part, 1½-story Flemish bond brick wing built in 1760, with a dormered gable roof. It was constructed by Charles Daffin who received a patent for the land in 1784 under the name of Daffin's Farm.

Future president Andrew Jackson met Charles Dickinson here in 1796. Jackson would later kill Dickinson in an 1806 duel at Adairville, Kentucky.

Daffin House was listed on the National Register of Historic Places in 1975.
