= Neck Meetinghouse and Yard =

Historic church in Maryland, United States

- U.S. National Register of Historic Places
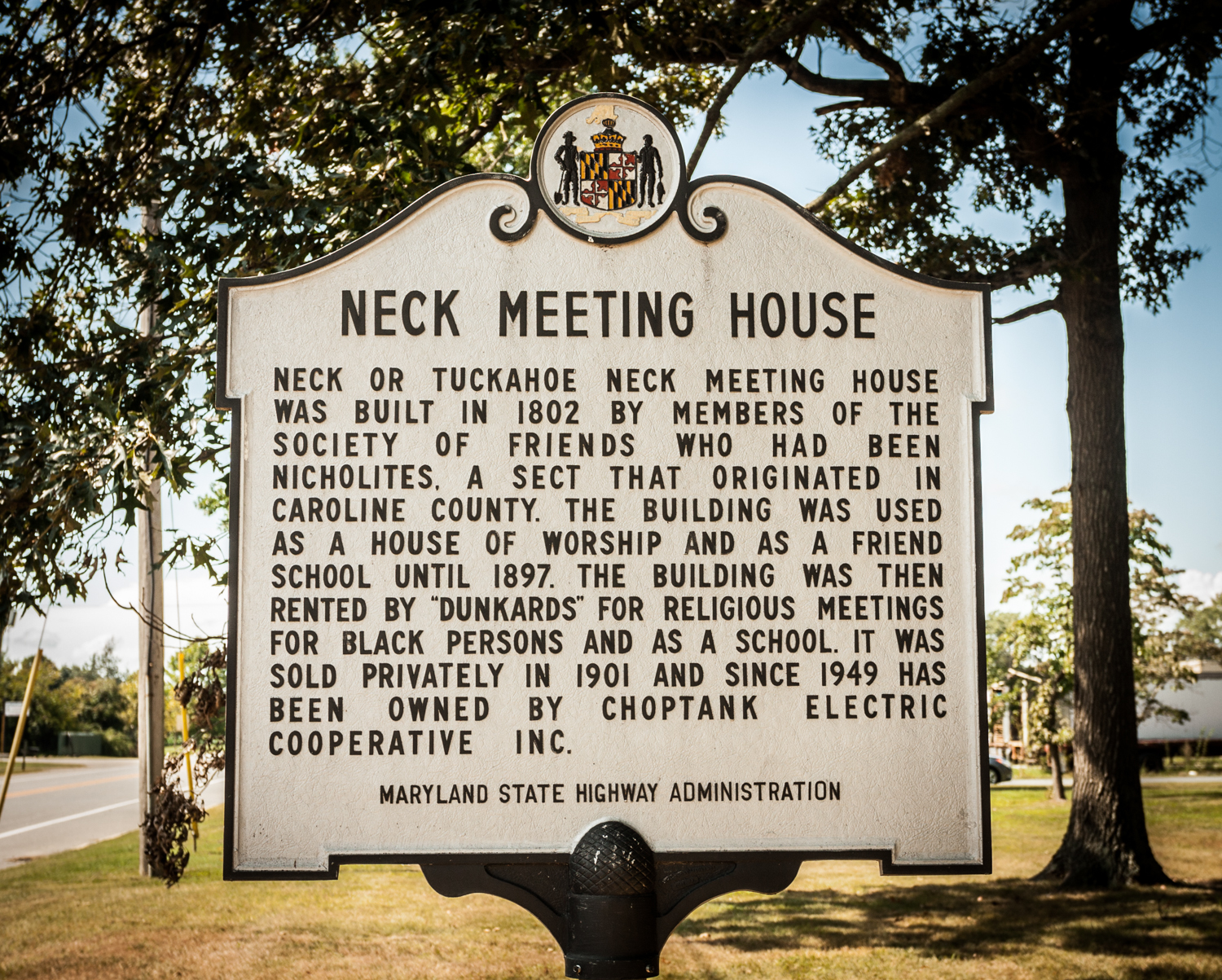

- Location within Maryland Location within the United States
- Location: MD 404, West Denton, Maryland, U.S.
- Coordinates: 38°53′26″N 75°50′29″W
- Area: 1.5 acres (0.61 ha)
- Built: 1802
- NRHP reference No.: 76000982
- Added to NRHP: October 22, 1976

The Neck Meetinghouse and Yard, also known as the Quaker Meetinghouse and Graveyard, is a historic Quaker meetinghouse located at West Denton, Caroline County, Maryland. It is a one-story rectangular frame building with a pitched gable roof measuring 30 feet, 8 1/2 inches long and 20 feet, 5 inches deep. In the graveyard are six marked burials with stones dating from the 1850s to 1890, with some more recent interments. It is the only extant Friends meeting house in Caroline County, and one of only a few still standing on the Eastern Shore. The meeting house was utilized from September 26, 1802, when the first meeting was held in the building, until it was abandoned in 1890 for lack of funds and participants.

It was listed on the National Register of Historic Places in 1976.

== Saving the Meetinghouse ==
With Quakers moving away or joining other meetings, Tuckahoe Neck quickly fell into disrepair. In 1930, a few of the former members made an attempt at limited repairs, but once again it was left to deteriorate. By 2002, the building was in a terrible condition with extensive termite damage. Major restoration work took place over the next two years. This included new footing and brick piers, replacement of termite damaged sills, and floor joists with new beams and joists being installed, and a new shingle roof added.

As had occurred in the past, there was no regular maintenance, and by 2017 more repairs were needed. The east end of the building required the most attention, and was repaired by the summer of 2019. However, there was no plan to address the need for repair of the other three sides or to establish a plan for regular maintenance. As a result, a few individuals came forward with a fundraising plan to restore the building, but also to establish a trust to provide perpetual care.
