= West Denton, Maryland =

- Census-designated place
- Location within Maryland
- Coordinates: 38°53′19″N 75°50′20″W
- Country: United States
- State: Maryland
- County: Caroline

Area
  - Total: 0.29 sq mi (0.75 km^{2})
  - Land: 0.29 sq mi (0.75 km^{2})
  - Water: 0 sq mi (0.00 km^{2})
- Elevation: 5 ft (1.5 m)

Population (2020)
  - Total: 46
  - Density: 159/sq mi (61.3/km^{2})
- Time zone: UTC−5 (Eastern (EST))
  - Summer (DST): UTC−4 (EDT)
- ZIP code: 21629
- Area code: 410
- FIPS code: 24-82625
- GNIS feature ID: 0591517

West Denton is an unincorporated community and census-designated place (CDP) in Caroline County, Maryland, United States. As of the 2010 census it had a population of 52.

It is located on the west bank of the Choptank River, across from Denton, the Caroline County seat. Maryland Route 404 Business crosses the Choptank and the oldest portion of the community on a bridge constructed in 1979. Maryland Route 328 forms the western edge of the CDP, and the Maryland Route 404 bypass (Shore Highway) forms the northern edge, crossing the Choptank on the Governor Harry R. Hughes Bridge, constructed in 1982.

Located at West Denton are the Neck Meetinghouse and Yard and West Denton Warehouse-Wharf, both listed on the National Register of Historic Places.

== Demographics ==
Historical population
Census	Pop.	Note	%±
2010	52		—
2020	46		−11.5%
U.S. Decennial Census
