= St. Paul's Episcopal Church (Hillsboro, Maryland) =

Historic church in Maryland, United States

- U.S. National Register of Historic Places
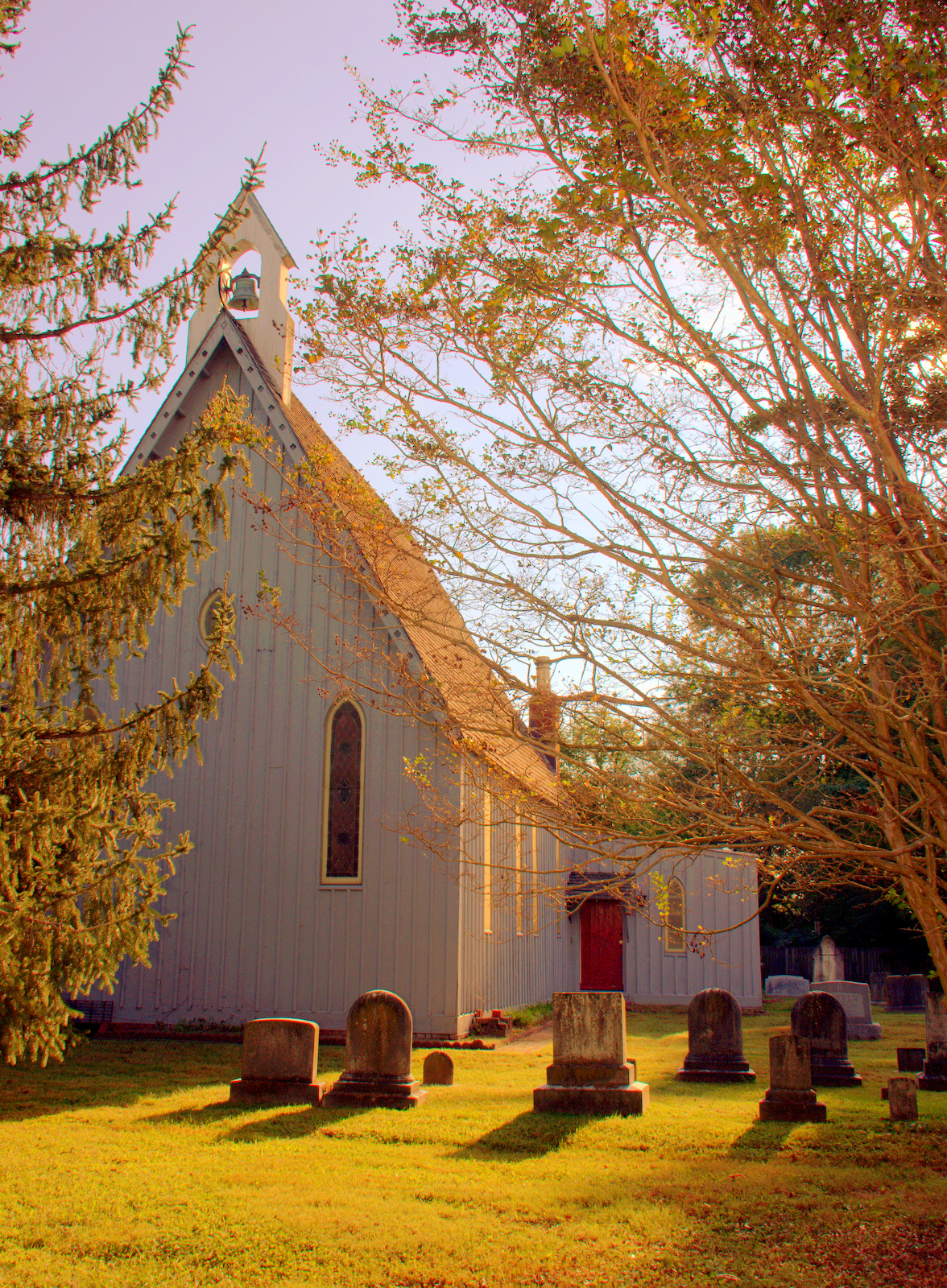

- Location within Maryland Location within the United States
- Location: S of MD 404, Hillsboro, Maryland
- Coordinates: 38°54′56″N 75°56′32″W
- Area: 2 acres (0.81 ha)
- Built: 1853
- Architect: Upjohn, Richard
- Architectural style: Carpenter Gothic
- NRHP reference No.: 75000874
- Added to NRHP: May 12, 1975

The St. Paul's Episcopal Church is an historic Episcopal church located at Hillsboro, Caroline County, Maryland. It is a small board-and-batten Carpenter Gothic-style structure set on a brick foundation. Its design is based upon a book of plans and sketches published in 1852 by Richard Upjohn.

It was listed on the National Register of Historic Places in 1975.

== See also ==
- List of post 1692 Anglican parishes in the Province of Maryland
