= Leonard House (Greensboro, Maryland) =

Historic house in Maryland, United States

- U.S. National Register of Historic Places
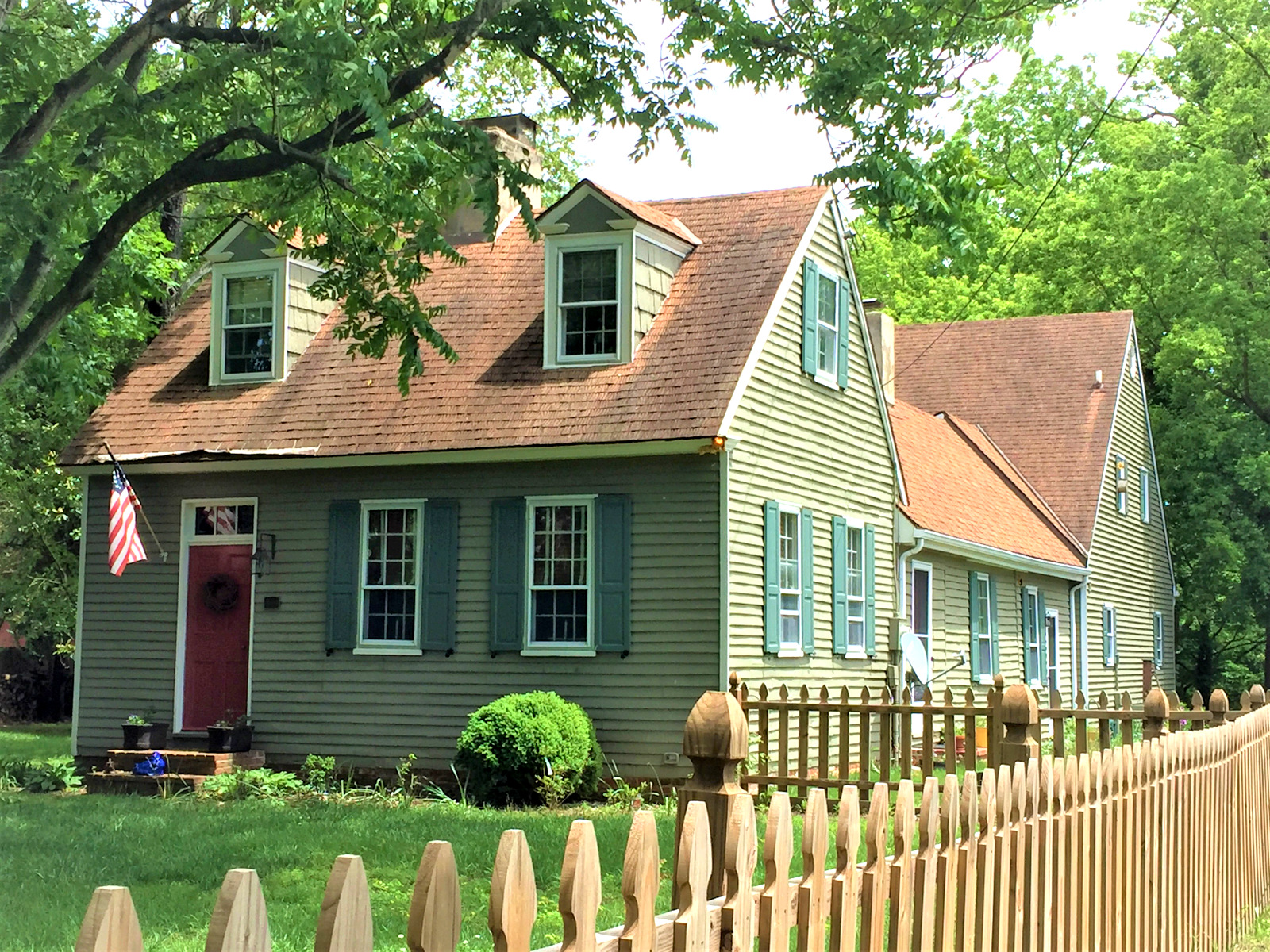

- Location within Maryland Location within the United States
- Location: Main St. Greensboro, Maryland
- Coordinates: 38°58′43″N 75°48′14″W
- Area: 1.3 acres (0.53 ha)
- Built: 1832
- Architectural style: Greek Revival
- NRHP reference No.: 88001444
- Added to NRHP: November 14, 1988

The Leonard House, also known as the Second Methodist Church Parsonage, is a historic home located at Greensboro, Caroline County, Maryland, United States. It is a small, 1 1/2-story frame dwelling with Greek Revival–influenced decorative detailing. It was constructed about 1832 presumably as the parsonage for the second Methodist church in Greensboro. The house has evidence suggestive of segregated access to servant's quarters in the loft of the wing.

The Leonard House was listed on the National Register of Historic Places in 1988.
