= Greensboro, Maryland =

- Town
- Flag Seal

- Location of Greensboro, Maryland

- Location within the U.S. state of Maryland Greensboro (the United States)
- Coordinates: 38°58′32″N 75°48′25″W
- Country: United States of America
- State: Maryland
- County: Caroline
- Incorporated: 1826

Area
  - Total: 1.07 sq mi (2.78 km^{2})
  - Land: 1.07 sq mi (2.78 km^{2})
  - Water: 0 sq mi (0.00 km^{2})
- Elevation: 16 ft (5 m)

Population (2020)
  - Total: 1,919
  - Density: 1,786.4/sq mi (689.73/km^{2})
- Time zone: UTC-5 (Eastern (EST))
  - Summer (DST): UTC-4 (EDT)
- ZIP code: 21639
- Area code: 410
- FIPS code: 24-35200
- GNIS feature ID: 0590381
- Website: www.greensboromd.com

Greensboro is a town located on the banks of the Choptank River in Caroline County, Maryland, United States. As of the 2020 census, Greensboro had a population of 1,919. The ZIP code is 21639. The primary phone exchange is 482 and the area code is 410. The town is served by Maryland Routes 480 and 313.

Greensboro hosted the Caroline County Softball League, which produced both state and national champions.

Willow Grove was listed on the National Register of Historic Places in 1972. Leonard House was listed in 1988 and Brick House Farm in 2009.

== Geography ==
Greensboro is located at 38°58′32″N 75°48′25″W.

According to the United States Census Bureau, the town has a total area of 1.05 square miles (2.72 km^{2}), all land.

== Demographics ==
Historical population
Census	Pop.	Note	%±
1860	406		—
1870	561		38.2%
1880	684		21.9%
1890	902		31.9%
1900	641		−28.9%
1910	609		−5.0%
1920	668		9.7%
1930	760		13.8%
1940	737		−3.0%
1950	1,181		60.2%
1960	1,160		−1.8%
1970	1,173		1.1%
1980	1,253		6.8%
1990	1,441		15.0%
2000	1,632		13.3%
2010	1,931		18.3%
2020	1,919		−0.6%
U.S. Decennial Census

=== 2020 census ===
As of the 2020 census, Greensboro had a population of 1,919. The median age was 33.9 years. 27.9% of residents were under the age of 18 and 13.0% of residents were 65 years of age or older. For every 100 females there were 92.3 males, and for every 100 females age 18 and over there were 93.4 males age 18 and over.

0.0% of residents lived in urban areas, while 100.0% lived in rural areas.

There were 703 households in Greensboro, of which 37.3% had children under the age of 18 living in them. Of all households, 41.0% were married-couple households, 17.9% were households with a male householder and no spouse or partner present, and 31.9% were households with a female householder and no spouse or partner present. About 30.6% of all households were made up of individuals and 14.8% had someone living alone who was 65 years of age or older.

There were 791 housing units, of which 11.1% were vacant. The homeowner vacancy rate was 4.3% and the rental vacancy rate was 9.1%.

Racial composition as of the 2020 census
Race	Number	Percent
White	1,303	67.9%
Black or African American	243	12.7%
American Indian and Alaska Native	12	0.6%
Asian	20	1.0%
Native Hawaiian and Other Pacific Islander	0	0.0%
Some other race	148	7.7%
Two or more races	193	10.1%
Hispanic or Latino (of any race)	256	13.3%

=== 2010 census ===
As of the census of 2010, there were 1,931 people, 703 households, and 477 families living in the town. The population density was 1,839.0 inhabitants per square mile (710.0/km^{2}). There were 798 housing units at an average density of 760.0 per square mile (293.4/km^{2}). The racial makeup of the town was 75.8% White, 13.6% African American, 0.9% Native American, 0.8% Asian, 1.4% Pacific Islander, 4.0% from other races, and 3.6% from two or more races. Hispanic or Latino of any race were 9.4% of the population.

There were 703 households, of which 42.4% had children under the age of 18 living with them, 42.0% were married couples living together, 18.3% had a female householder with no husband present, 7.5% had a male householder with no wife present, and 32.1% were non-families. 27.3% of all households were made up of individuals, and 12.4% had someone living alone who was 65 years of age or older. The average household size was 2.74 and the average family size was 3.30.

The median age in the town was 30.2 years. 30% of residents were under the age of 18; 10.5% were between the ages of 18 and 24; 30.2% were from 25 to 44; 19.5% were from 45 to 64; and 9.8% were 65 years of age or older. The gender makeup of the town was 46.5% male and 53.5% female.

=== 2000 census ===
As of the census of 2000, there were 1,632 people, 616 households, and 407 families living in the town. The population density was 2,451.3 inhabitants per square mile (946.5/km^{2}). There were 674 housing units at an average density of 1,012.4 per square mile (390.9/km^{2}). The racial makeup of the town was 78.86% White, 16.91% African American, 0.06% Native American, 0.67% Asian, 1.78% from other races, and 1.72% from two or more races. Hispanic or Latino of any race were 2.63% of the population.

There were 616 households, out of which 40.6% had children under the age of 18 living with them, 41.7% were married couples living together, 19.6% had a female householder with no husband present, and 33.9% were non-families. 29.1% of all households were made up of individuals, and 13.6% had someone living alone who was 65 years of age or older. The average household size was 2.64 and the average family size was 3.28.

In the town, the population was spread out, with 32.4% under the age of 18, 9.4% from 18 to 24, 29.4% from 25 to 44, 16.5% from 45 to 64, and 12.3% who were 65 years of age or older. The median age was 31 years. For every 100 females, there were 85.0 males. For every 100 females age 18 and over, there were 80.8 males.

The median income for a household in the town was $31,397, and the median income for a family was $36,083. Males had a median income of $27,092 versus $20,729 for females. The per capita income for the town was $13,787. About 15.6% of families and 16.5% of the population were below the poverty line, including 21.6% of those under age 18 and 17.1% of those age 65 or over.

== Communities ==
- Maple Village
- Foxgrape Farm
- Cedar Run
- Spring Branch
- Holly Corner
- Choptank Overlook
- Four Corners
- Three Corners
- Bowen Estates
- Choptank Ponds
- East Cherry
- Kinnamon Meadows (Under Construction)
- Greensboro Farms
- Caroline Farms

== Transportation ==
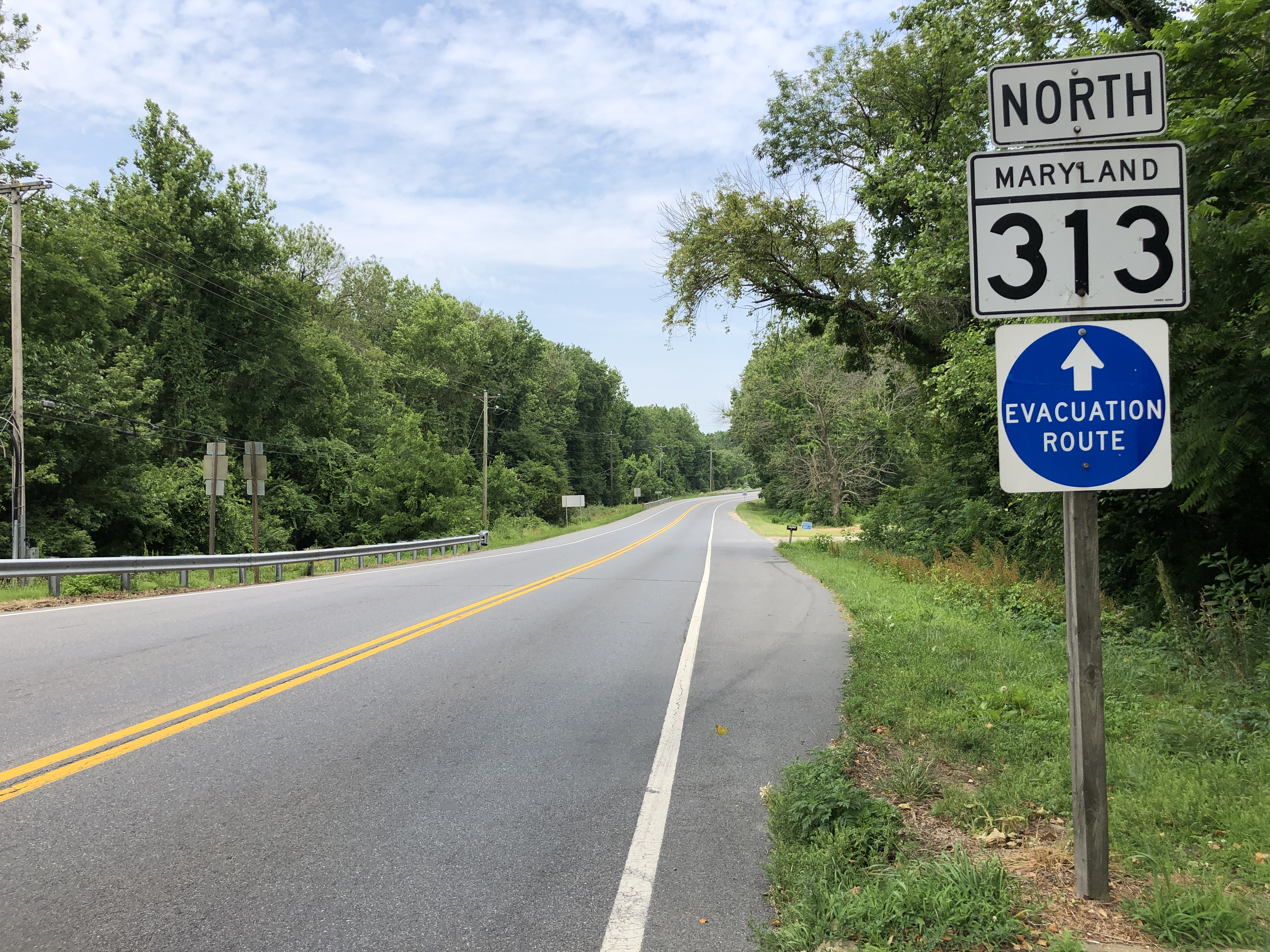
MD 313 northbound in Greensboro

The primary means of travel to and from Greensboro is by road. The town lies at the junction of three state highways: Maryland Route 313, which travels north-south through the town, Maryland Route 314, which travels east from the town, and Maryland Route 480, which heads southwest from the town.

== Notable people ==
- T. Alan Goldsborough, jurist
- William Hersey Hopkins, college administrator
