= Hillsboro, Maryland =

- Town
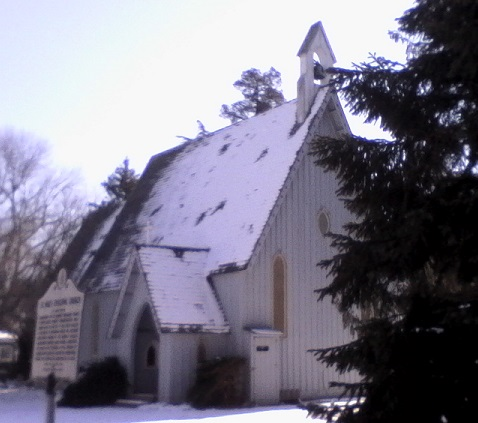
- St. Paul's Episcopal Church in Hillsboro

- Seal Logo

- Location of Hillsboro, Maryland

- Location within the U.S. state of Maryland Hillsboro (the United States)
- Coordinates: 38°55′00″N 75°56′20″W
- Country: United States of America
- State: Maryland
- County: Caroline
- Incorporated: 1853

Area
  - Total: 0.14 sq mi (0.35 km^{2})
  - Land: 0.14 sq mi (0.35 km^{2})
  - Water: 0 sq mi (0.00 km^{2})
- Elevation: 39 ft (12 m)

Population (2020)
  - Total: 128
  - Density: 946.0/sq mi (365.27/km^{2})
- Time zone: UTC-5 (Eastern (EST))
  - Summer (DST): UTC-4 (EDT)
- ZIP code: 21641
- Area code: 410
- FIPS code: 24-39175
- GNIS feature ID: 584985
- Website: https://hillsboromd.com/

Hillsboro is a town in Caroline County, Maryland, United States. As of the 2020 census, Hillsboro had a population of 128. Daffin House and St. Paul's Episcopal Church were listed on the National Register of Historic Places in 1975.

== History ==
Hillsboro is the oldest town in Caroline County. Evidence shows that as early as 1694 there was an Anglican chapel-of-ease located on the Eastern bank of the Tuckahoe.

Commercially Hillsboro was the site of a tobacco warehouse, one or more general stores, a shoe factory, and a tavern.

Painter Charles Willson Peale briefly resided in Hillsboro.

The first newspaper to be published in Caroline County was published in Hillsboro in 1831 by Lucas Brothers.

Hillsboro previously known as Tuckahoe Bridge was named in the honor of Lord Hillsboro of the Calvert Family. In 1804 there was a fever epidemic in Hillsboro then again in 1816; both occurred in the same house the Seller residence. Hillsboro was the site of the Tri-County fair and the meeting place of Congressional Conventions.

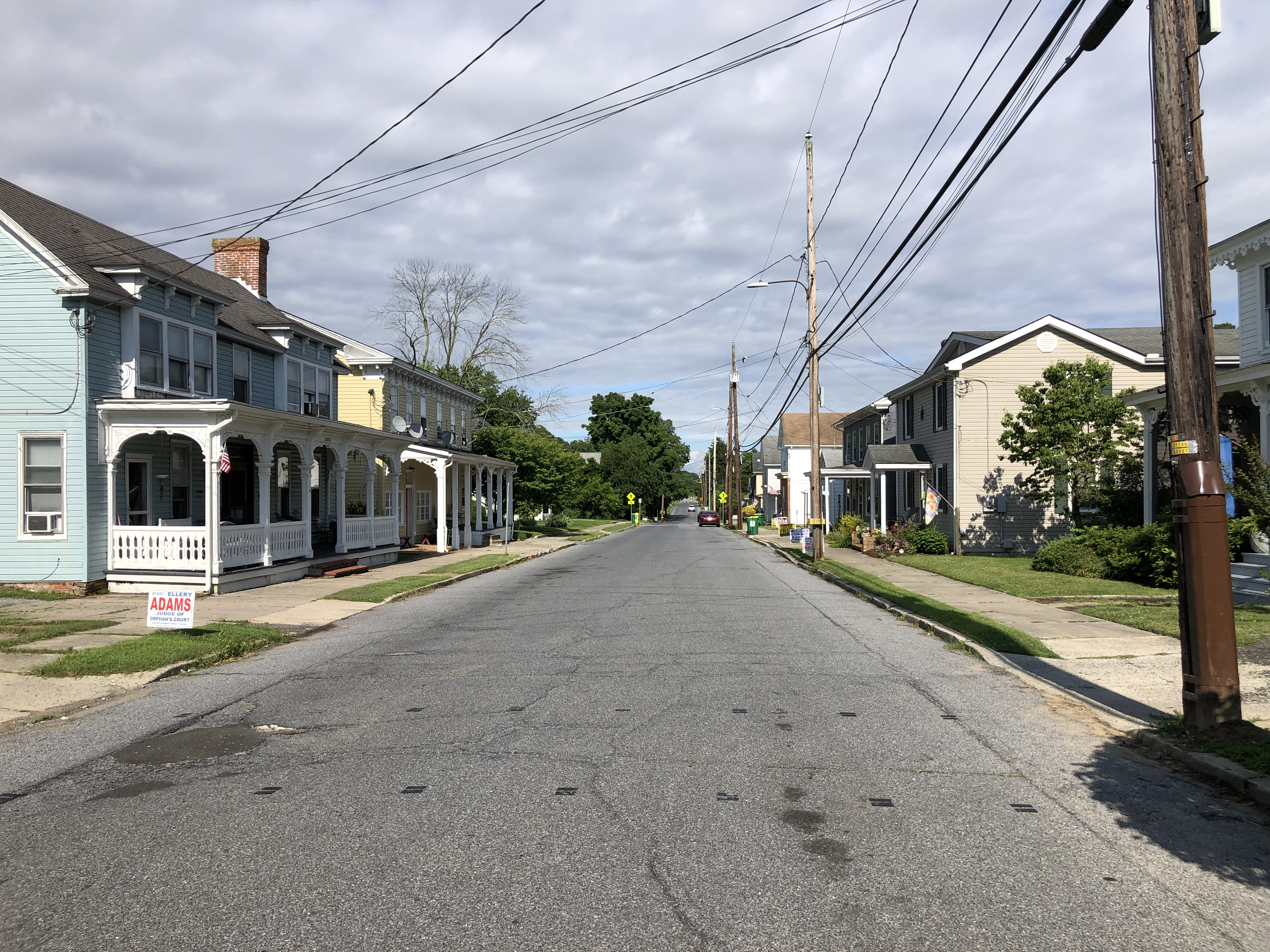
MD 404 Alt. eastbound in Hillsboro

== Transportation ==
The main method of transport to and from Hillsboro is by road. Maryland Route 404 Alternate is the only state highway serving the town. Maryland Route 404 and Maryland Route 480 pass just outside the town limits to the north and northeast.

== Geography ==
Hillsboro is located at 38°54′59″N 75°56′29″W (38.916284, -75.941354).

According to the United States Census Bureau, the town has a total area of 0.15 square miles (0.39 km^{2}), all land.

=== Climate ===
The climate in this area is characterized by hot, humid summers and generally mild to cool winters. According to the Köppen Climate Classification system, Hillsboro has a humid subtropical climate, abbreviated "Cfa" on climate maps.

== Demographics ==
Historical population
Census	Pop.	Note	%±
1880	264		—
1890	174		−34.1%
1900	196		12.6%
1910	209		6.6%
1920	222		6.2%
1930	200		−9.9%
1940	181		−9.5%
1950	179		−1.1%
1960	201		12.3%
1970	177		−11.9%
1980	180		1.7%
1990	164		−8.9%
2000	163		−0.6%
2010	161		−1.2%
2020	128		−20.5%
U.S. Decennial Census

=== 2010 census ===
As of the census of 2010, there were 161 people, 68 households, and 46 families living in the town. The population density was 1,073.3 inhabitants per square mile (414.4/km^{2}). There were 75 housing units at an average density of 500.0 per square mile (193.1/km^{2}). The racial makeup of the town was 96.3% White, 2.5% African American, and 1.2% from other races. Hispanic or Latino of any race were 3.1% of the population.

There were 68 households, of which 32.4% had children under the age of 18 living with them, 45.6% were married couples living together, 14.7% had a female householder with no husband present, 7.4% had a male householder with no wife present, and 32.4% were non-families. 26.5% of all households were made up of individuals, and 10.3% had someone living alone who was 65 years of age or older. The average household size was 2.37 and the average family size was 2.78.

The median age in the town was 38.3 years. 22.4% of residents were under the age of 18; 10.6% were between the ages of 18 and 24; 29.9% were from 25 to 44; 26% were from 45 to 64; and 11.2% were 65 years of age or older. The gender makeup of the town was 47.2% male and 52.8% female.

=== 2000 census ===
At the 2000 census, there were 163 people, 71 households and 45 families living in the town. The population density was 1,140.6 inhabitants per square mile (440.4/km^{2}). There were 78 housing units at an average density of 545.8 per square mile (210.7/km^{2}). The racial makeup of the town was 98.16% White, 1.23% African American, and 0.61% from two or more races. Hispanic or Latino of any race were 0.61% of the population.

There were 71 households, of which 29.6% had children under the age of 18 living with them, 52.1% were married couples living together, 8.5% had a female householder with no husband present, and 36.6% were non-families. 29.6% of all households were made up of individuals, and 11.3% had someone living alone who was 65 years of age or older. The average household size was 2.30 and the average family size was 2.71.

Age distribution was 20.9% under the age of 18, 9.8% from 18 to 24, 33.1% from 25 to 44, 23.3% from 45 to 64, and 12.9% who were 65 years of age or older. The median age was 37 years. For every 100 females, there were 94.0 males. For every 100 females age 18 and over, there were 87.0 males.

The median household income was $29,583, and the median family income was $35,500. Males had a median income of $29,167 versus $20,000 for females. The per capita income for the town was $16,318. None of the families and 9.5% of the population were living below the poverty line, including no under eighteens and 11.1% of those over 64.

== Communities ==
- Haketts Garden
- Hillsboro Estates
- Thomas Town
- Lor-J-Estates
