= Ridgely, Maryland =

- Town
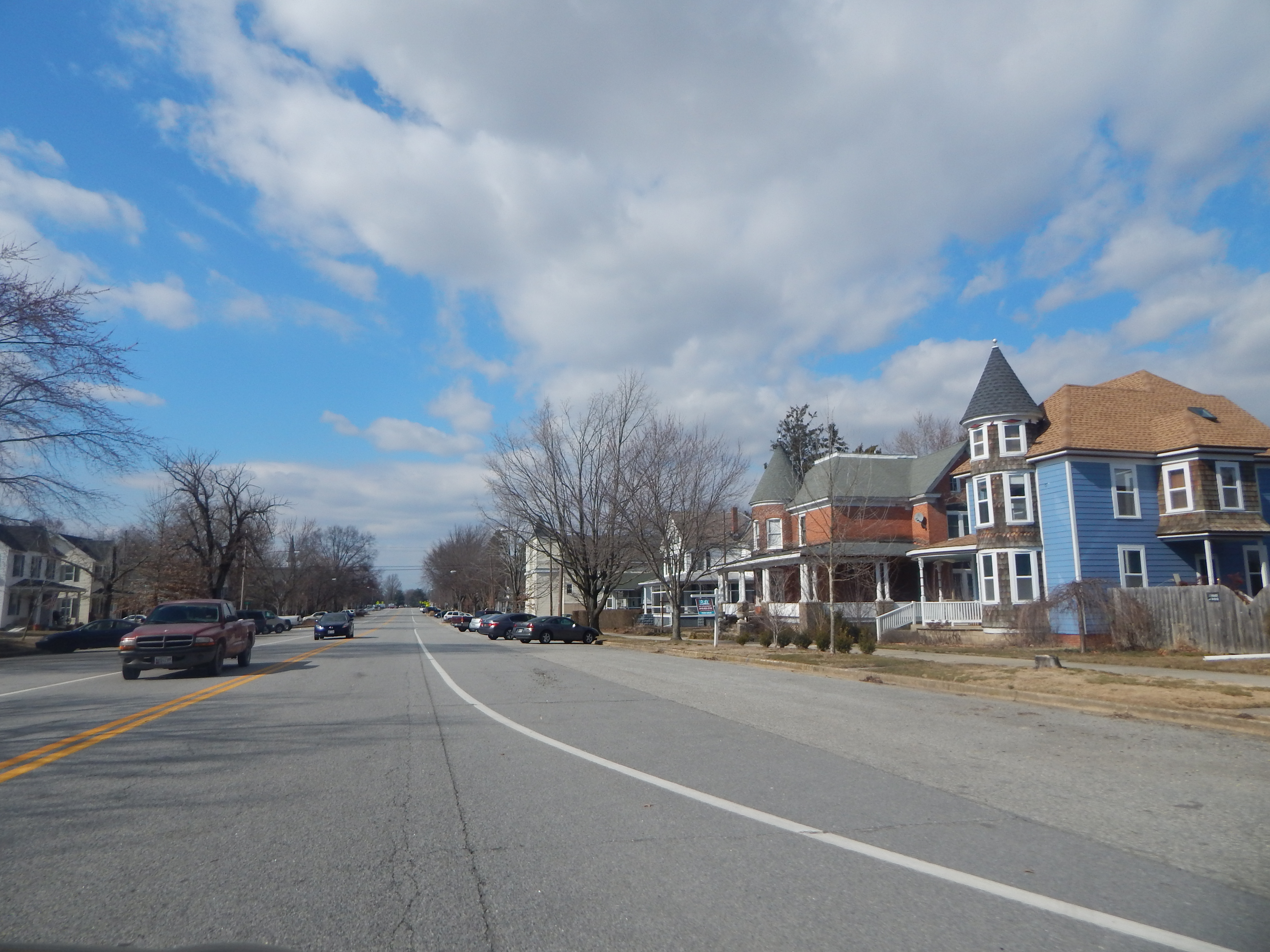
- Downtown Ridgely in March 2015

- Flag Seal
- Motto: "Dream City"
- Location of Ridgely, Maryland

- Location within the U.S. state of Maryland Ridgely (the United States)
- Coordinates: 38°56′42″N 75°53′1″W
- Country: United States
- State: Maryland
- County: Caroline
- Incorporated: 1896

Area
  - Total: 1.86 sq mi (4.83 km^{2})
  - Land: 1.86 sq mi (4.83 km^{2})
  - Water: 0 sq mi (0.00 km^{2})
- Elevation: 59 ft (18 m)

Population (2020)
  - Total: 1,611
  - Density: 864.1/sq mi (333.65/km^{2})
- Time zone: UTC−5 (Eastern (EST))
  - Summer (DST): UTC−4 (EDT)
- ZIP code: 21660
- Area code: 410
- FIPS code: 24-66000
- GNIS feature ID: 0586831
- Website: Town of Ridgely, Maryland

Ridgely is a town in Caroline County, Maryland, United States. As of the 2020 census, Ridgely had a population of 1,611.

== History ==
The town was established on May 13, 1867, by the Maryland and Baltimore Land Association. The land around present day Ridgely was purchased by the Maryland and Baltimore Land Association from Thomas Bell and the Reverend Greenbury W. Ridgely (2 May 1798-16 Aug 1883) . The town was named after the Rev. Greenbury W. Ridgely.

A railroad boom in the 1860s on the Delmarva Peninsula was fueling land speculation. Civil engineer J.J. Sickler from Philadelphia was commissioned to design the town's layout. The Land Association began construction and built four buildings, including a railroad station, hotel, and two private residences during the first year. James K. Saulsbury constructed a combined store and residence, now known as the Ridgely House.

During the Land's Association's first year, it went bankrupt; Ridgely was left unfinished and sparsely populated. Most properties were sold at public auction, and Ridgely began to grow gradually as a result of its location on the Maryland and Delaware Rail Road Company line.

Ridgely's economy flourished as a result of its local crop production, including strawberries, huckleberries, vegetables, eggs, and poultry. Most crops were processed in Ridgely or sent to various locations on the railroad. As the nation began to rely on highways instead of railroads for transportation and industry began to concentrate in larger urban areas, Ridgely's economy declined.

Ridgely became known as the "Strawberry Capital of the World" as a result of its prosperous agricultural business. Every May, Ridgely hosts the Strawberry Festival to celebrate its past. A Ridgely Historical Society was created in 2005 for the same purpose.

== Geography ==
According to the United States Census Bureau, the town has a total area of 1.78 square miles (4.61 km^{2}), all land.

== Demographics ==
Historical population
Census	Pop.	Note	%±
1880	81		—
1890	215		165.4%
1900	713		231.6%
1910	943		32.3%
1920	809		−14.2%
1930	703		−13.1%
1940	920		30.9%
1950	834		−9.3%
1960	886		6.2%
1970	822		−7.2%
1980	933		13.5%
1990	1,034		10.8%
2000	1,352		30.8%
2010	1,639		21.2%
2020	1,611		−1.7%
U.S. Decennial Census

=== 2020 census ===
As of the 2020 census, Ridgely had a population of 1,611. The median age was 38.4 years. 24.4% of residents were under the age of 18 and 15.0% of residents were 65 years of age or older. For every 100 females there were 86.2 males, and for every 100 females age 18 and over there were 76.8 males age 18 and over.

0.0% of residents lived in urban areas, while 100.0% lived in rural areas.

There were 618 households in Ridgely, of which 33.3% had children under the age of 18 living in them. Of all households, 40.6% were married-couple households, 16.2% were households with a male householder and no spouse or partner present, and 34.0% were households with a female householder and no spouse or partner present. About 29.3% of all households were made up of individuals and 13.5% had someone living alone who was 65 years of age or older.

There were 685 housing units, of which 9.8% were vacant. The homeowner vacancy rate was 1.7% and the rental vacancy rate was 14.5%.

Racial composition as of the 2020 census
Race	Number	Percent
White	1,196	74.2%
Black or African American	197	12.2%
American Indian and Alaska Native	3	0.2%
Asian	25	1.6%
Native Hawaiian and Other Pacific Islander	0	0.0%
Some other race	81	5.0%
Two or more races	109	6.8%
Hispanic or Latino (of any race)	151	9.4%

=== 2010 census ===
As of the census of 2010, there were 1,639 people, 604 households, and 412 families residing in the town. The population density was 920.8 inhabitants per square mile (355.5/km^{2}). There were 667 housing units at an average density of 374.7 per square mile (144.7/km^{2}). The racial makeup of the town was 77.1% White, 16.3% African American, 0.9% Native American, 0.2% Asian, 2.5% from other races, and 3.1% from two or more races. Hispanic or Latino of any race were 5.9% of the population.

There were 604 households, of which 44.7% had children under the age of 18 living with them, 46.9% were married couples living together, 16.1% had a female householder with no husband present, 5.3% had a male householder with no wife present, and 31.8% were non-families. 27.2% of all households were made up of individuals, and 9.8% had someone living alone who was 65 years of age or older. The average household size was 2.71 and the average family size was 3.26.

The median age in the town was 32 years. 30.9% of residents were under the age of 18; 6.9% were between the ages of 18 and 24; 30.4% were from 25 to 44; 22.9% were from 45 to 64; and 8.9% were 65 years of age or older. The gender makeup of the town was 47.0% male and 53.0% female.

=== 2000 census ===
As of the census of 2000, there were 1,352 people, 513 households, and 349 families residing in the town. The population density was 1,269.0 inhabitants per square mile (490.0/km^{2}). There were 553 housing units at an average density of 519.1 per square mile (200.4/km^{2}). The racial makeup of the town was 81.58% White, 15.61% African American, 0.22% Native American, 0.59% Asian, 0.96% from other races, and 1.04% from two or more races. Hispanic or Latino of any race were 3.18% of the population.

There were 513 households, out of which 39.6% had children under the age of 18 living with them, 49.5% were married couples living together, 15.0% had a female householder with no husband present, and 31.8% were non-families. 26.9% of all households were made up of individuals, and 10.7% had someone living alone who was 65 years of age or older. The average household size was 2.63 and the average family size was 3.21.

In the town, the age distribution of the population shows 30.4% under the age of 18, 8.1% from 18 to 24, 31.1% from 25 to 44, 19.6% from 45 to 64, and 10.8% who were 65 years of age or older. The median age was 33 years. For every 100 females, there were 89.6 males. For every 100 females age 18 and over, there were 87.1 males.

The median income for a household in the town was $35,750, and the median income for a family was $38,929. Males had a median income of $27,356 versus $19,844 for females. The per capita income for the town was $15,581. About 7.8% of families and 11.3% of the population were below the poverty line, including 12.4% of those under age 18 and 14.6% of those age 65 or over.

== Arts and culture ==
=== Historic places ===
Oak Lawn was listed on the National Register of Historic Places in 1975. Marble Head was listed in 2002.

=== Points of interest ===
- Adkins Arboretum

=== Strawberry Festival ===
Ridgelyites boast of the widest main street of any town in Maryland; it was once considered "The Strawberry Capital" and still holds a Strawberry Festival each May.

== Government ==
In March 2024, the town suspended with pay its entire police force of six officers for an as yet unknown reason. Shortly thereafter, the town signed an interim agreement with Caroline County Sheriff's department for policing services. The Maryland State Police also assisted. In May 2024, the town signed a one-year agreement with the county starting July 1, 2024 for police services. There is still no word on what caused the suspensions. In August 2024, the entire police department was exonerated and no criminal charges were being filed. Many citizens want the entire force reinstated.

== Infrastructure ==
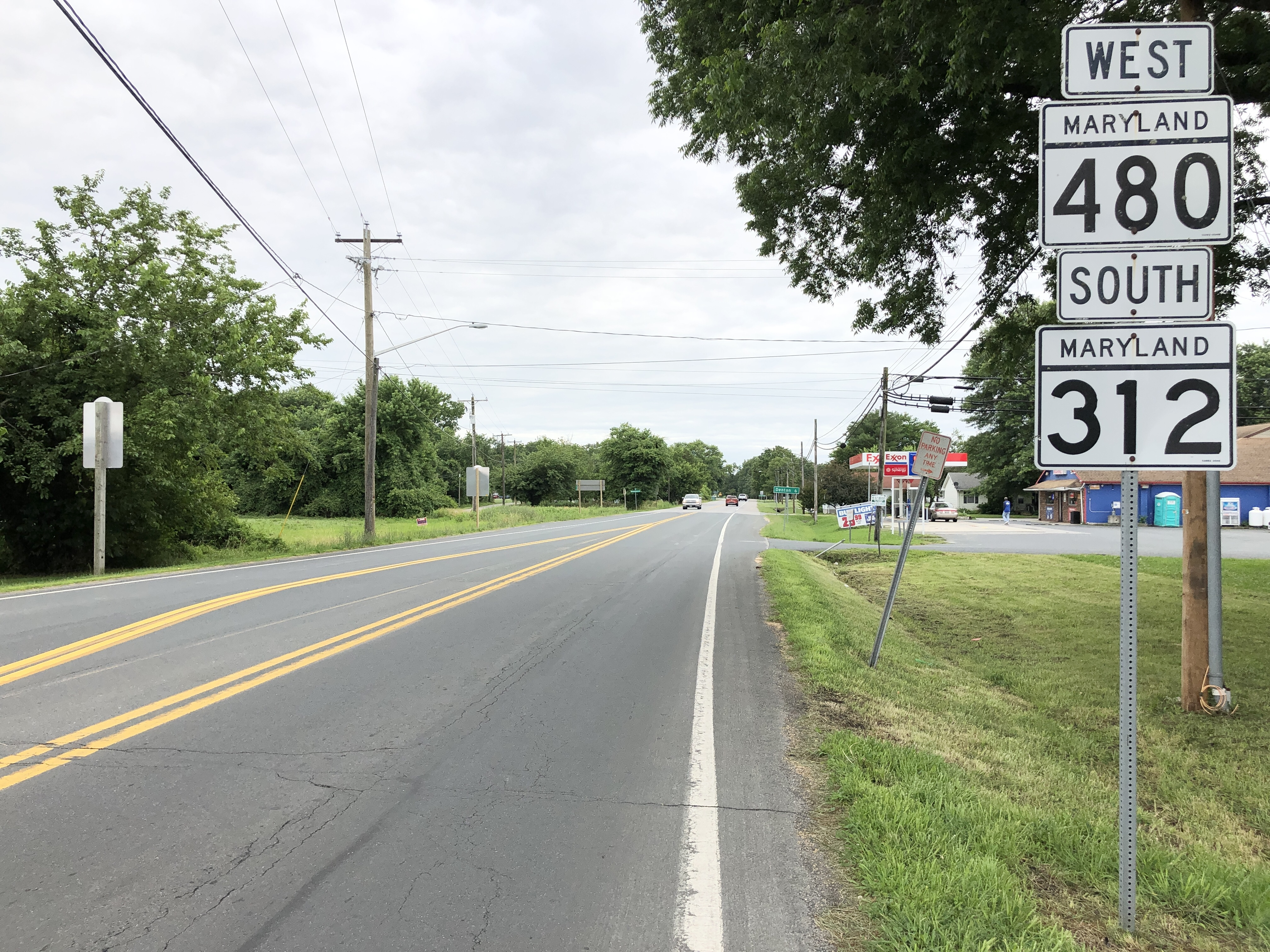
MD 312 and MD 480 in Ridgely

=== Transportation ===
Transportation to and from Ridgely is primarily by road, and three state highways serve the town. These include Maryland Route 312, which is signed north-south but has an alignment closer to north-northeast by south-southwest, and Maryland Route 480, which is signed east-west but has an alignment closer to east-northeast by west-southwest. Maryland Route 776 also traverses Ridgely, serving as a local connector.

The Ridgely Airpark serves the area also.

== Notable people ==
- Home Run Baker, Baseball Hall of Famer.
- Buck Herzog, a former major league baseball player with the New York Giants, Boston Braves, Cincinnati Reds, and Chicago Cubs from 1908 to 1920.
- Thomas Alexander Smith, congressman
- Frank E. Williams (1865–1920), state senator, Presbyterian minister and editor and publisher of The Cecil Whig
