= Maryland Route 16 =

State highway in Maryland, USA

Maryland Route 16
- Maryland Route 16 highlighted in red

Route information
- Maintained by MDSHA
- Length: 51.06 mi (82.17 km)
- Existed: 1927–present
- Tourist routes: Harriet Tubman Underground Railroad Byway; Chesapeake Country Scenic Byway

Major junctions
- West end: Hoopers Neck Road in Taylors Island
- MD 335 in Church Creek; MD 341 in Cambridge; US 50 near Whitehall; MD 14 near Secretary; MD 392 in East New Market; MD 318 near Linchester; MD 331 in Preston; MD 578 at Harmony; MD 313 / MD 404 near Denton; MD 313 in Andersontown
- East end: DE 16 at Hickman

Location
- Country: United States
- State: Maryland
- Counties: Dorchester, Caroline

Highway system
- Maryland highway system; Interstate; US; State; Scenic Byways
| ← US 15 | → MD 17 |

Maryland Route 16 (MD 16) is a state highway in the U.S. state of Maryland. The state highway runs 51.06 miles (82.17 km) from Taylors Island east to the Delaware state line in Hickman, where the highway continues as Delaware Route 16 (DE 16). MD 16 connects Cambridge with several communities in northern Dorchester County and southwestern Caroline County, including East New Market and Preston. The state highway runs concurrently with U.S. Route 50 (US 50) near Cambridge, MD 331 between East New Market and Preston, and both MD 404 and MD 313 near Andersontown. MD 16 was constructed between Church Creek and Preston as one of the original state roads in the early and mid-1910s. The highway was extended in both directions in the late 1910s: north to what was to be designated MD 313 near Denton and west to Taylors Island. MD 16 was extended through Andersontown to the Delaware state line in the early 1930s. MD 16's bypass of Cambridge was constructed in the mid-1960s.

== Route description ==
MD 16 is a part of the National Highway System as a principal arterial from Dailsville Road at the western city limit of Cambridge east to US 50 in Cambridge. The highway is also a part of the main National Highway System along its concurrencies with US 50 near Cambridge and MD 404 near Denton.

=== Dorchester County ===
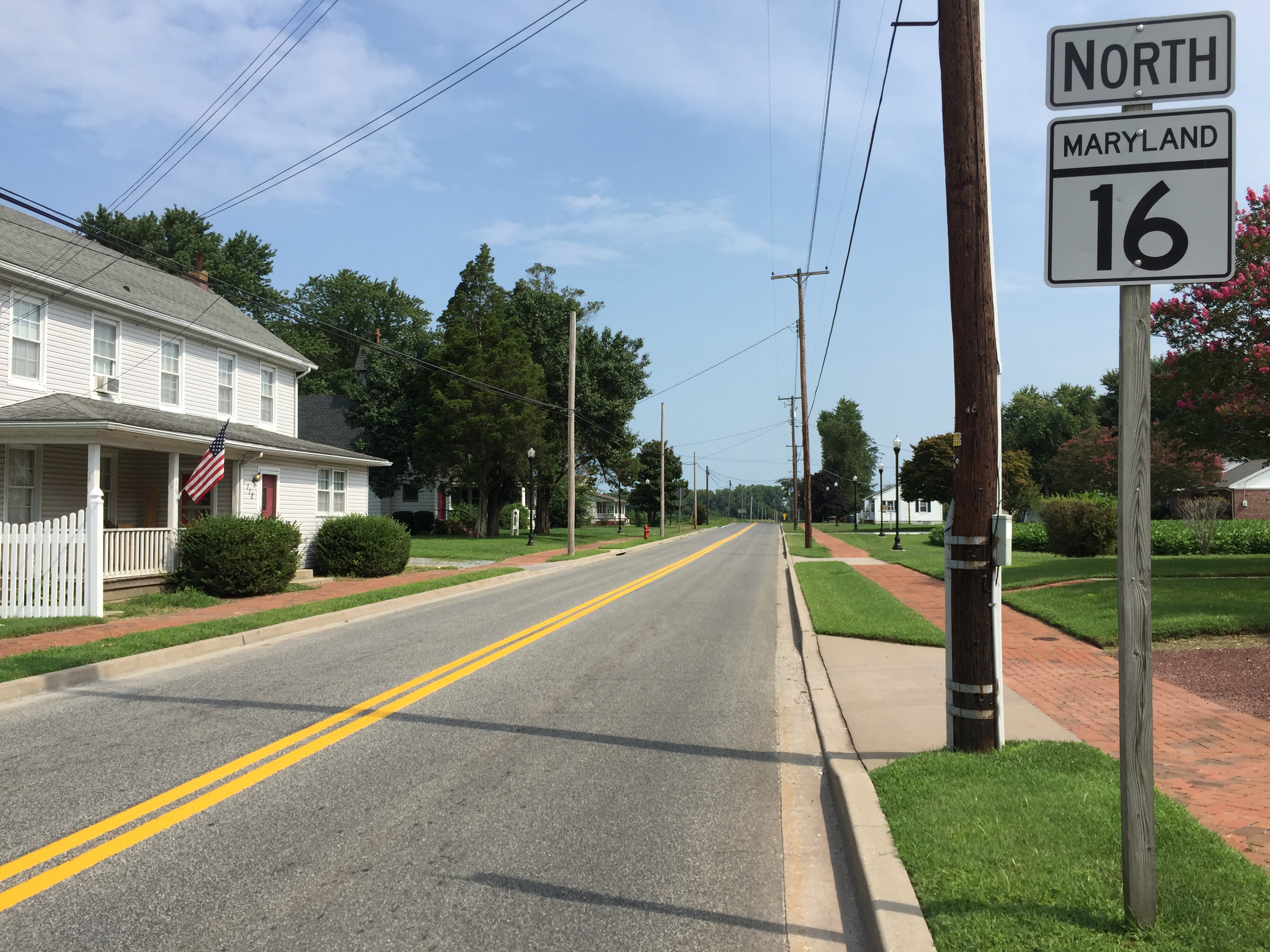
View north along MD 16 at MD 14 in East New Market

MD 16 begins on Taylors Island a short distance west of the bridge over Slaughter Creek to the mainland. The roadway continues west as county-maintained Hoopers Neck Road, which provides access to the historic Ridgeton Farm, Grace Episcopal Church Complex, and Bethlehem Methodist Episcopal Church. MD 16 heads northeast from the island as two-lane undivided Taylors Island Road. The state highway crosses Parsons Creek and passes through the hamlets of Madison and Woolford on its way to the town of Church Creek, where MD 16 intersects MD 335 (Golden Hill Road). A park and ride lot is located south of this intersection. MD 16 continues northeast as Church Creek Road toward Cambridge, where the state highway intersects MD 341 (Race Street), which is the old alignment of MD 16, just beyond Cambridge-South Dorchester High School along the southern edge of the city. MD 16 continues east and meets Woods Road at a roundabout before it curves north and crosses the Seaford Line of the Maryland and Delaware Railroad at-grade prior to an intersection with US 50 (Ocean Gateway). The state highway joins US 50 in a concurrency along the four-lane divided highway. US 50 and MD 16 intersect Bucktown Road, which leads southeast to Cambridge-Dorchester Airport, and both ends of MD 750 (Old Route 50) before reaching the eastern end of the concurrency in the community of Whitehall, also known as Mount Holly.

MD 16 heads northeast from US 50 as two-lane undivided Mount Holly Road. As the state highway approaches East New Market, the western terminus of MD 14 (Secretary Road) heads north toward Secretary and MD 392 (East New Market Bypass) heads northeast toward Hurlock. MD 16 turns north into the town, where the highway passes through the East New Market Historic District as Main Street. The state highway intersects MD 14 (Railroad Avenue) before leaving town as East New Market Ellwood Road. MD 16 crosses the Warwick River and Cabin Creek before meeting MD 331 (Waddells Corner Road) at Waddells Corner. MD 16 joins MD 331 in a concurrency that crosses Gravel Creek and passes Beulah Road, the old alignment of MD 16 and MD 331 through Ellwood. After an at-grade crossing of the Preston Branch of the Seaford Line of the Maryland and Delaware Railroad, the two state highways intersect MD 318 (Preston Road) and continue northwest as Preston Road, which passes near the Jacob and Hannah Leverton House before crossing Hunting Creek into Caroline County.

=== Caroline County ===
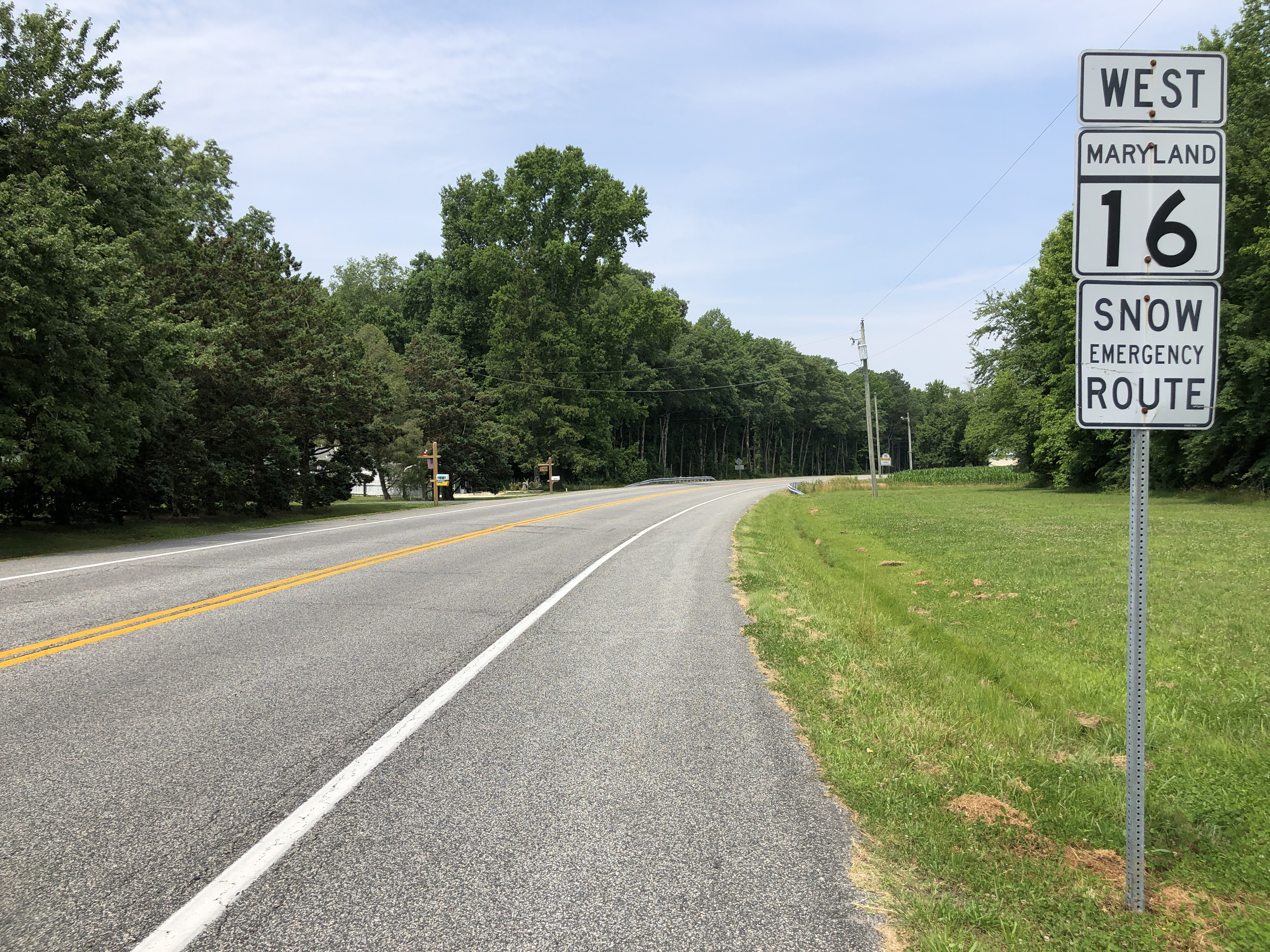
MD 16 westbound past its eastern terminus at DE 16 at the Delaware state line in Hickman

The MD 16–MD 331 concurrency continues northwest through Linchester, where the highway passes both ends of MD 817 (Linchester Road), which provides access to the historic Linchester Mill. The state highways continue through the town of Preston as Main Street. Unsigned MD 324 (Maple Avenue) heads south from MD 16 and MD 331 before the two highways split on the west side of town. MD 16 heads north as Harmony Road through the hamlet of Grove and intersects MD 578 (Bethlehem Road) in the community of Harmony. The state highway crosses Fowling Creek and Robins Creek and passes through the hamlet of Two Johns, which is also known as Bureau.

As MD 16 passes to the west of Williston Lake, an impoundment of Mill Creek, the highway closely parallels its old alignment, MD 617. The state highway passes through the Williston Mill Historic District just east of the community of Williston, which contains the historic homes Potter Hall and Memory Lane. MD 16 continues northeast until reaching an intersection with MD 404 and MD 313 (Shore Highway) south of Denton. MD 16 turns southeast onto Shore Highway, a four-lane divided highway that reduces to two lanes east of the intersection, to form a triple state highway concurrency. The three state highways continue east to Andersontown, where MD 313 heads south as Federalsburg Highway. A short distance to the east, MD 404 continues straight southeast while MD 16 turns northeast onto Greenwood Road. Shortly thereafter, MD 16 reaches its eastern terminus at the Delaware state line in Hickman. The highway continues east as DE 16 (Hickman Road) toward Greenwood.

== History ==
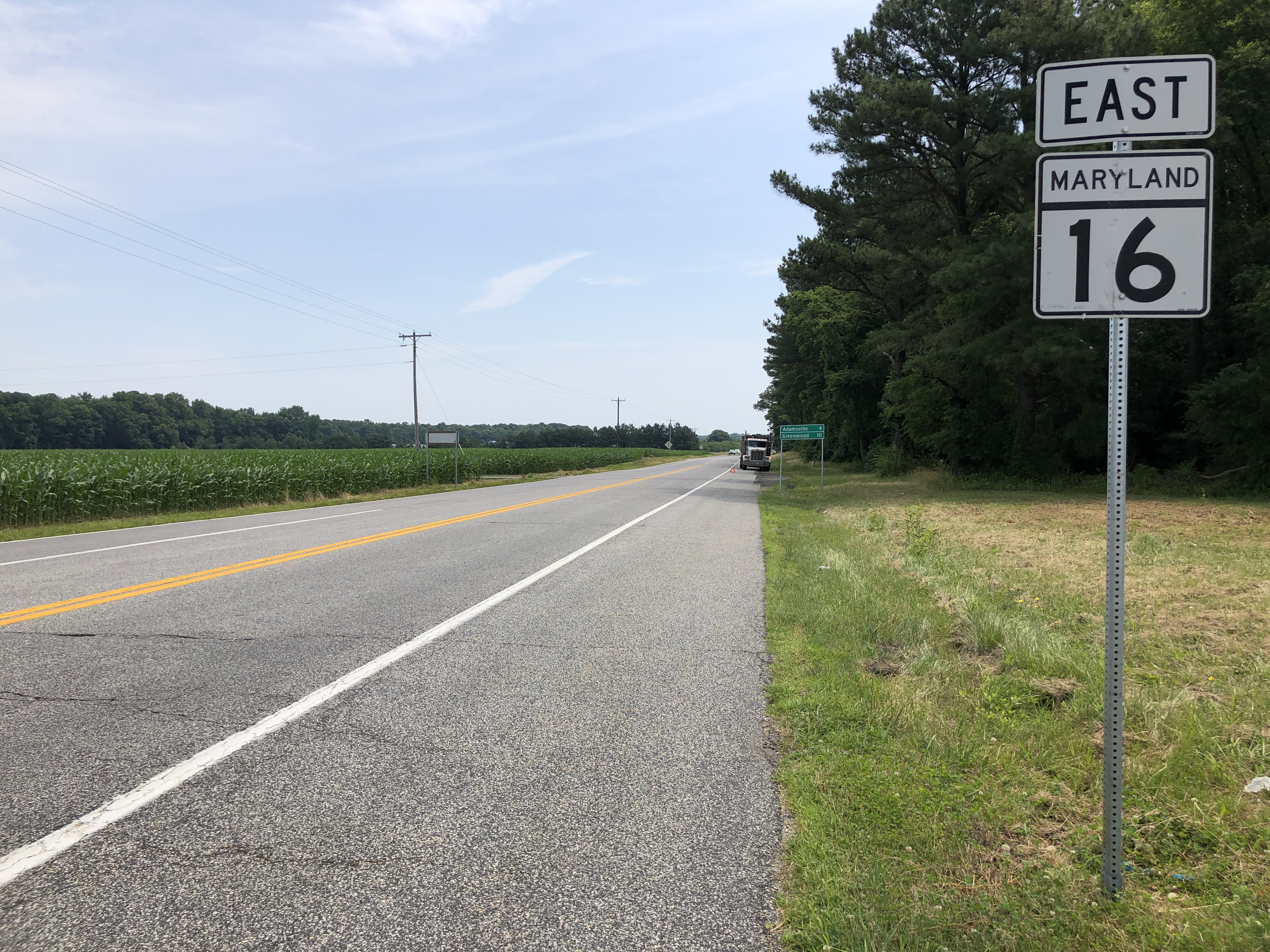
MD 16 eastbound past MD 404 in Andersontown

The portion of MD 16 between Church Creek and East New Market via Cambridge was chosen as one of the original state roads by the Maryland State Roads Commission in 1909. The portion of the highway between Bureau and the western junction with MD 313 and MD 404 south of Denton was also included in the planned state road system; that piece of highway was the first part of modern MD 16 completed in 1910. MD 16 was completed from Mount Holly to East New Market in 1911, from Cambridge to Mount Holly in 1913, from East New Market to Preston via Linchester in 1914, and from Church Creek to Cambridge in 1915. The gap in the state highway within East New Market was closed in 1917. The segment of highway between Preston and Grove was surfaced by 1915. MD 16 between Grove and Bureau was under construction by 1919 and finished around 1920. The state highway was constructed from the bridge to Taylor's Island to Church Creek between 1917 and 1919.

Maryland Route 450
- Location: Caroline County
- Existed: 1930–1939

When numbers were assigned to state highways in Maryland in 1927, MD 16 had a concurrency with US 213 between Waddell's Corner and Preston. Greenwood Road from MD 404 in Andersontown to the Delaware state line was built between 1930 and 1933 as MD 450. MD 16 was extended north and east through Andersontown to the Delaware state line by 1939, giving the state highway additional concurrencies with MD 313 and MD 404, replacing MD 450. Also in 1939, US 213 between Easton and Vienna was transferred to a new route via Cambridge; the old portion of US 213 was designated MD 331 and the new section of US 213 became concurrent with MD 16 between Cambridge and Mount Holly. Within Cambridge, MD 16 followed Race Street north to Washington Street, which the highway followed east toward Mount Holly.

The next changes in MD 16 occurred in the 1950s. MD 16 was extended west across Slaughter Creek to Taylors Island when a new bridge was completed in 1950. MD 313 was moved to its present alignment between Federalsburg and Denton in 1954; as a result, MD 16 became the sole route from Bureau to MD 404 south of Denton and part of a triple concurrency from there to Andersontown. US 50, which had replaced US 213 from Ocean City to Wye Mills in 1949, was expanded to a divided highway along its concurrency with MD 16 by 1955. MD 331 and MD 16 were realigned around Ellwood and Linchester around 1960. MD 16 was relocated to bypass Cambridge in 1967; the state highway's old route through the city was transferred to newly designated MD 341 and an extension of MD 343 east to US 50. MD 16 was relocated at Williston Lake shortly after the construction of a new bridge across the lake's outlet, Mill Creek, in 1968. The state highway was straightened out through Madison in 1970, leaving behind Old Madison Road. In 2018, a roundabout was constructed at Woods Road.

== Junction list ==
| County | Location | mi | km | Destinations | Notes |
|---|---|---|---|---|---|
| Dorchester | Taylors Island | 0.00 | 0.00 | Hoopers Neck Road west | Western terminus |
| Dorchester | Church Creek | 9.56 | 15.39 | MD 335 south (Golden Hill Road) – Hoopers Island | Northern terminus of MD 335 |
| Dorchester | Cambridge | 14.60 | 23.50 | MD 341 north (Race Street) / Maple Dam Road south – Cambridge | Southern terminus of MD 341 |
| Dorchester | Cambridge | 16.90 | 27.20 | US 50 west (Ocean Gateway) – Easton | West end of concurrency with US 50 |
| Dorchester | Cambridge | 17.31 | 27.86 | MD 750 east (Old Route 50) / Bucktown Road south | Western terminus of MD 750 |
| Dorchester | Cambridge | 18.11 | 29.15 | MD 750 west (Old Route 50) | Eastern terminus of MD 750 |
| Dorchester | Whitehall | 19.56 | 31.48 | US 50 east (Ocean Gateway) – Salisbury | East end of concurrency with US 50; no direct access from westbound MD 16 to eastbound US 50 |
| Dorchester | East New Market | 23.52 | 37.85 | MD 14 east (Secretary Road) – Secretary | Western terminus of MD 14 |
| Dorchester | East New Market | 24.41 | 39.28 | MD 392 east (East New Market Bypass) – Hurlock | Western terminus of MD 392 |
| Dorchester | East New Market | 25.17 | 40.51 | MD 14 (Railroad Avenue) – Secretary, Eldorado | |
| Dorchester | Waddells Corner | 29.15 | 46.91 | MD 331 south (Waddells Corner Road) – Hurlock | West end of concurrency with MD 331 |
| Dorchester | Linchester | 32.47 | 52.26 | MD 318 east (Preston Road) – Federalsburg | Western terminus of MD 318 |
| Caroline | Linchester | 32.69 | 52.61 | MD 817 north (Linchester Road) | Southern terminus of MD 817; officially MD 817A |
| Caroline | Preston | 33.11 | 53.29 | MD 817 south (Linchester Road) | Northern terminus of MD 817; officially MD 817A |
| Caroline | Preston | 33.66 | 54.17 | MD 324 south (Maple Avenue) – Choptank | Northern terminus of MD 324 |
| Caroline | Preston | 33.73 | 54.28 | MD 331 north (Main Street) – Easton | East end of concurrency with MD 331 |
| Caroline | Harmony | 38.85 | 62.52 | MD 578 west (Bethlehem Road) – Bethlehem | Eastern terminus of MD 578 |
| Caroline | Denton | 45.39 | 73.05 | MD 313 north / MD 404 west (Shore Highway) to US 50 west – Denton, Bay Bridge | West end of concurrency with MD 313 / MD 404 |
| Caroline | Andersontown | 47.67 | 76.72 | MD 313 south (Federalsburg Highway) – Federalsburg, American Corner | East end of concurrency with MD 313 |
| Caroline | Andersontown | 48.56 | 78.15 | MD 404 east (Shore Highway) – Bridgeville | East end of concurrency with MD 404 |
| Caroline | Hickman | 51.06 | 82.17 | DE 16 east (Hickman Road) – Greenwood | Delaware state line; eastern terminus |
1.000 mi = 1.609 km; 1.000 km = 0.621 mi: Concurrency terminus

== Auxiliary route ==
MD 16A is the designation for the 0.04-mile (0.064 km) section of Beauchamp Branch Road between MD 16 and its old alignment, MD 617, just south of Williston Lake near Williston.
