= Williston, Maryland =

- Census-designated place
- Location within Maryland
- Coordinates: 38°49′51″N 75°51′3″W
- Country: United States
- State: Maryland
- County: Caroline

Area
  - Total: 0.28 sq mi (0.72 km^{2})
  - Land: 0.26 sq mi (0.68 km^{2})
  - Water: 0.015 sq mi (0.04 km^{2})
- Elevation: 25 ft (7.6 m)

Population (2020)
  - Total: 153
  - Density: 582.7/sq mi (224.98/km^{2})
- Time zone: UTC−5 (Eastern (EST))
  - Summer (DST): UTC−4 (EDT)
- ZIP code: 21629
- Area code: 410
- FIPS code: 24-85175
- GNIS feature ID: 0591562

Williston is an unincorporated town and census-designated place on the Eastern Shore of the U.S. state of Maryland, in Caroline County. As of the 2010 census it had a population of 155. It is situated between Maryland Route 16 on its eastern edge and the Choptank River on its west. It was originally known as Potter's Landing for its first resident, Zabdiel Potter. His home, Potter Hall, was listed on the National Register of Historic Places in 1982.

The Caroline-Dorchester County Fair is held annually just east of the village proper.

Several other historical features are located near Williston, including Memory Lane (Denton, Maryland), the Williston Mill Historic District, and the Williston Community Church

== Demographics ==
Historical population
| Census | Pop. | Note | %± |
|---|---|---|---|
| 2010 | 155 | | — |
| 2020 | 153 | | −1.3% |
U.S. Decennial Census

== Neighborhoods ==
- Williams Heights
