= Choptank =

Choptank may refer to a location in the eastern United States or a former Native American tribe:

- Choptank people

Communities

- Choptank, Maryland, Caroline County
- Choptank Mills, Delaware, Kent County

Other

- Choptank (Middletown, Delaware), listed on the National Register of Historic Places listings in southern New Castle County, Delaware
- Choptank Electric Cooperative, a not-for-profit energy organization
- Choptank River, a tributary of Chesapeake Bay
- Choptank River Fishing Pier, on the Choptank River
- Choptank River Light, a lighthouse near Oxford, Maryland
