= Maryland Route 341 =

State highway in Maryland, United States

Maryland Route 341
- Race Street
- MD 341 highlighted in red

Route information
- Maintained by MDSHA
- Length: 1.25 mi (2.01 km)
- Existed: 1967–present
- Tourist routes: Harriet Tubman Underground Railroad Byway; Chesapeake Country Scenic Byway

Major junctions
- South end: MD 16 in Cambridge
- North end: MD 343 in Cambridge

Location
- Country: United States
- State: Maryland
- Counties: Dorchester

Highway system
- Maryland highway system; Interstate; US; State; Scenic Byways
← US 340	→ MD 342

Maryland Route 341 (MD 341) is a state highway in the U.S. state of Maryland. Known as Race Street, the state highway runs 1.25 miles (2.01 km) from MD 16 north to MD 343 within the city of Cambridge in Dorchester County. The part of Race Street that is now MD 341 was constructed in the mid-1910s as one of the original state roads and designated as part of MD 16 in 1927. MD 341 was assigned to the road after MD 16 bypassed Cambridge in the 1960s.

== Route description ==
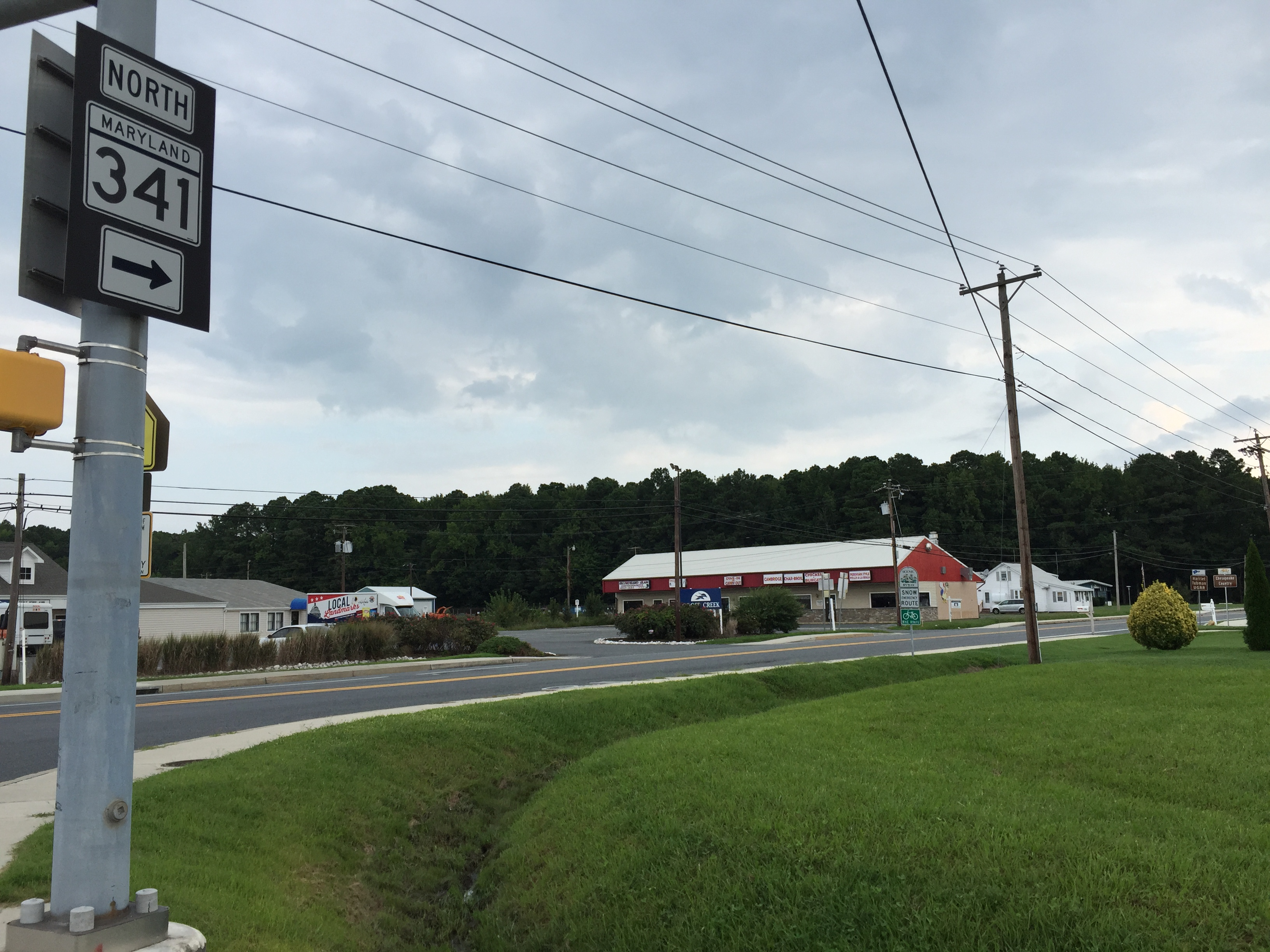
View north along MD 341 at MD 16 in Cambridge

MD 341 begins at an intersection with MD 16 (Church Creek Road) and Maple Dam Road near the southern edge of the city of Cambridge adjacent to Cambridge-South Dorchester High School. Maple Dam Road heads south toward Blackwater National Wildlife Refuge. MD 16 heads west toward Church Creek and east on a bypass of Cambridge toward U.S. Route 50. MD 341 heads north as a two-lane undivided road, passing through fields before transitioning to residential subdivisions and then residential neighborhoods as the highway approaches the center of Cambridge. The state highway reaches its northern terminus at an intersection with MD 343 (Washington Street). Race Street continues north toward downtown Cambridge as a municipal street.

== History ==
Race Street south of Washington Street was included as part of the Cambridge–Church Creek highway designated for improvement as a state road by the Maryland State Roads Commission in 1909. That 6-mile (9.7 km) highway was completed in 1915. The highway was designated part of MD 16, along with Washington Street east toward East New Market, in 1927. When MD 16 was rerouted to bypass Cambridge in 1967, MD 341 was assigned to the Race Street portion of the bypassed route.

== Junction list ==
The entire route is in Cambridge, Dorchester County.

mi	km	Destinations	Notes
0.00	0.00	MD 16 (Church Creek Road) / Maple Dam Road south – Church Creek, East New Market, Salisbury	Southern terminus
1.25	2.01	MD 343 (Washington Street) / Race Street north – Hudson, Easton	Northern terminus
1.000 mi = 1.609 km; 1.000 km = 0.621 mi
