= Madison, Maryland =

- Census-designated place
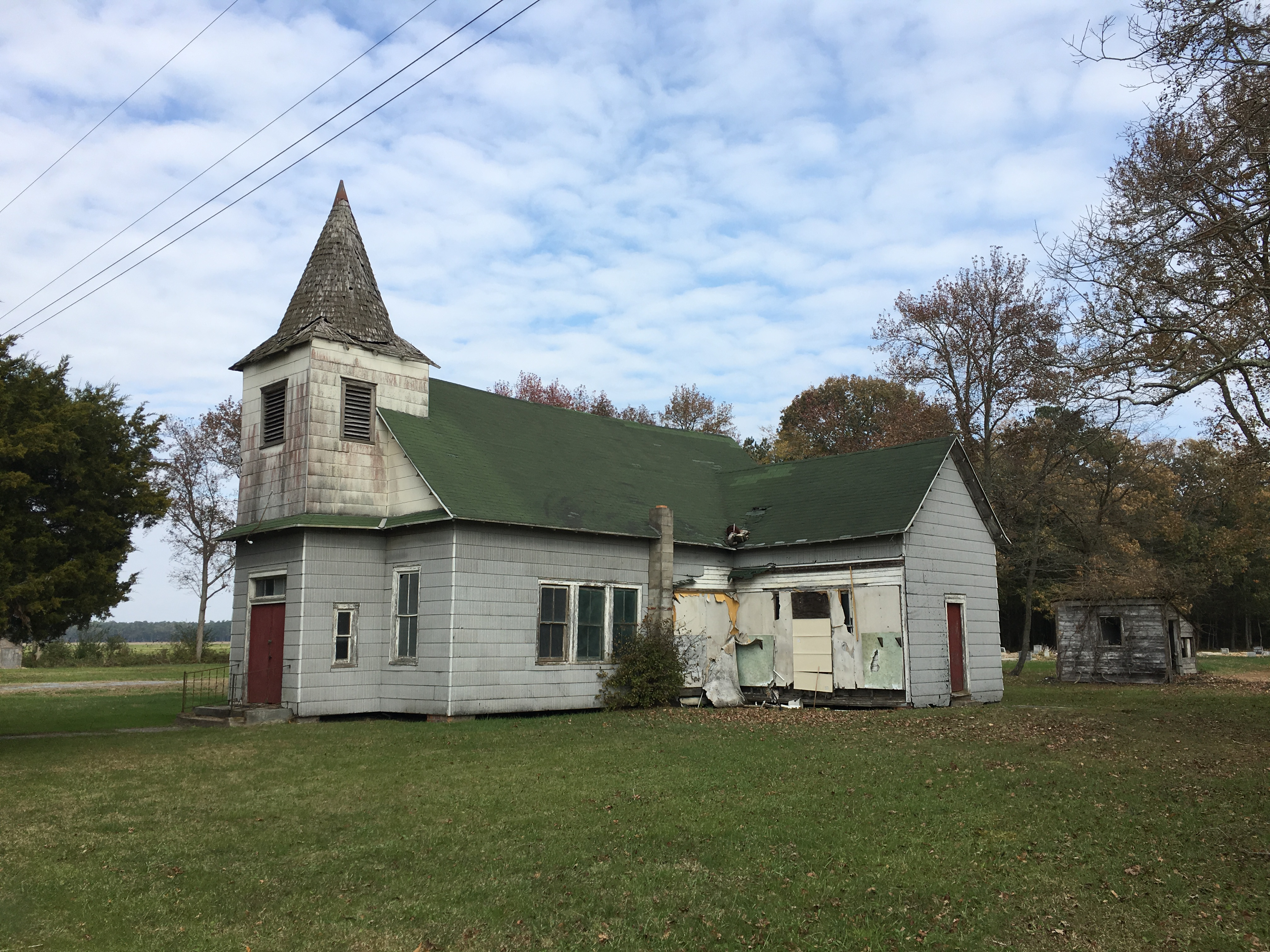
- Malone's Church, located just south of Madison

- Location in Maryland Madison (the United States)
- Coordinates: 38°30′25″N 76°13′19″W
- Country: United States
- State: Maryland
- County: Dorchester

Area
  - Total: 3.24 sq mi (8.40 km^{2})
  - Land: 3.20 sq mi (8.30 km^{2})
  - Water: 0.042 sq mi (0.11 km^{2})
- Elevation: 4 ft (1.2 m)

Population (2020)
  - Total: 205
  - Density: 64/sq mi (24.7/km^{2})
- Time zone: UTC−5 (Eastern (EST))
  - Summer (DST): UTC−4 (EDT)
- ZIP codes: 21648, 21677
- Area codes: 410, 443, and 667
- FIPS code: 24-49700
- GNIS feature ID: 585655

Madison is an unincorporated community and census-designated place (CDP) in Dorchester County, Maryland, United States. The population was 204 at the 2010 census.

== History ==
In the early 19th century, the community was a hamlet known as "Tobacco Stick." Around 1822, Harriet Tubman was born just outside the hamlet; in her youth, she lived in her father's cabin nearby, in what is now the Blackwater National Wildlife Refuge.

== Geography ==
Madison is located in western Dorchester County, at the south end of Madison Bay, an arm of the Little Choptank River and part of the Chesapeake Bay estuary system. Maryland Route 16 passes through the community, leading northeast 10 miles (16 km) to Cambridge, the county seat, and southwest 5 miles (8 km) to Taylors Island.

According to the United States Census Bureau, the Madison CDP has a total area of 3.2 square miles (8.4 km^{2}), of which 3.2 square miles (8.3 km^{2}) is land and 0.04 square miles (0.1 km^{2}), or 1.26%, is water.

== Demographics ==
Historical population
Census	Pop.	Note	%±
2010	204		—
2020	205		0.5%
U.S. Decennial Census
