= Friendship Hall =

Historic house in Maryland, United States

- U.S. National Register of Historic Places
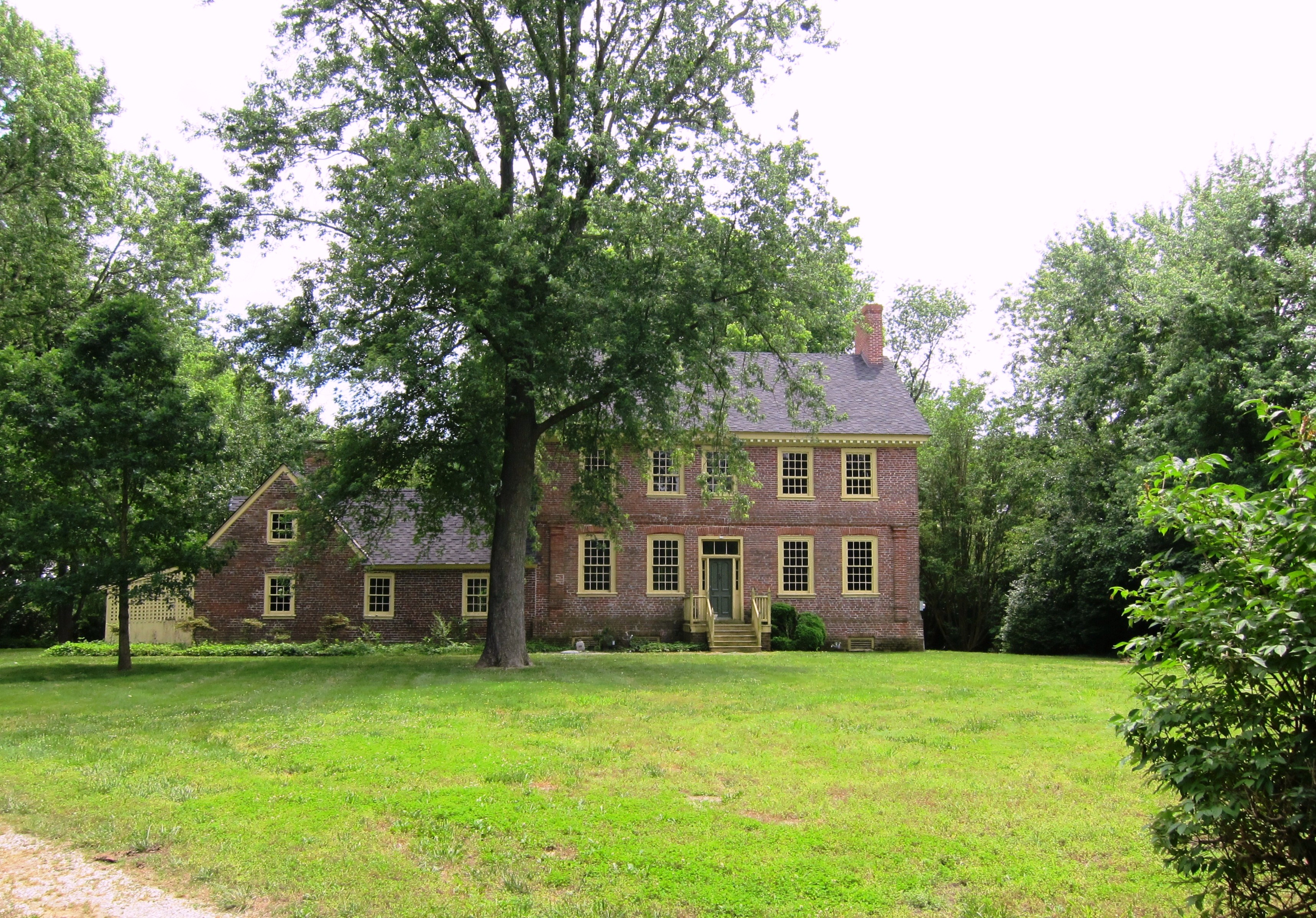
- Friendship Hall in 2011

- Location within Maryland Location within the United States
- Location: Off MD 14, East New Market, Maryland
- Coordinates: 38°35′41″N 75°55′28″W
- Area: 9 acres (3.6 ha)
- Built: 1790
- Architectural style: Georgian
- NRHP reference No.: 73000915
- Added to NRHP: October 18, 1973

Friendship Hall is a historic home located at East New Market, Dorchester County, Maryland. It is a Georgian-style brick dwelling. It consists of a large five-bay, two-story main block built about 1790; a two-bay one-story passage; and a 1 1/2-story kitchen wing. Also on the property is a tall frame smokehouse with board-and-batten siding and a steep gable roof. It is associated with the locally prominent Sulivane family, who first came to Maryland in 1695.

It was listed on the National Register of Historic Places in 1973.
