= Maryland Route 343 =

State highway in Maryland, United States

Maryland Route 343
- Maryland Route 343 highlighted in red

Route information
- Maintained by MDSHA
- Length: 11.29 mi (18.17 km)
- Existed: 1927–present
- Tourist routes: Chesapeake Country Scenic Byway

Major junctions
- West end: Hudson Road in Hudson
- MD 341 in Cambridge
- East end: US 50 in Cambridge

Location
- Country: United States
- State: Maryland
- Counties: Dorchester

Highway system
- Maryland highway system; Interstate; US; State; Scenic Byways
← MD 342	→ MD 344

Maryland Route 343 (MD 343) is a state highway in the U.S. state of Maryland. Known for most of its length as Hudson Road, the state highway runs 11.29 miles (18.17 km) from Hudson in northwestern Dorchester County east to U.S. Route 50 (US 50) in Cambridge. MD 343 was paved in the late 1920s and early 1930s. The state highway originally passed through downtown Cambridge, ending just west of its present terminus. After the original Choptank River Bridge was completed in the mid-1930s, MD 343 was truncated to Sunburst Highway. In the mid-1950s, the state highway was rerouted along Washington Street to Race Street, where it ended at MD 16. Finally, MD 343 was extended to its present terminus when MD 16 bypassed Cambridge in the late 1960s.

== Route description ==
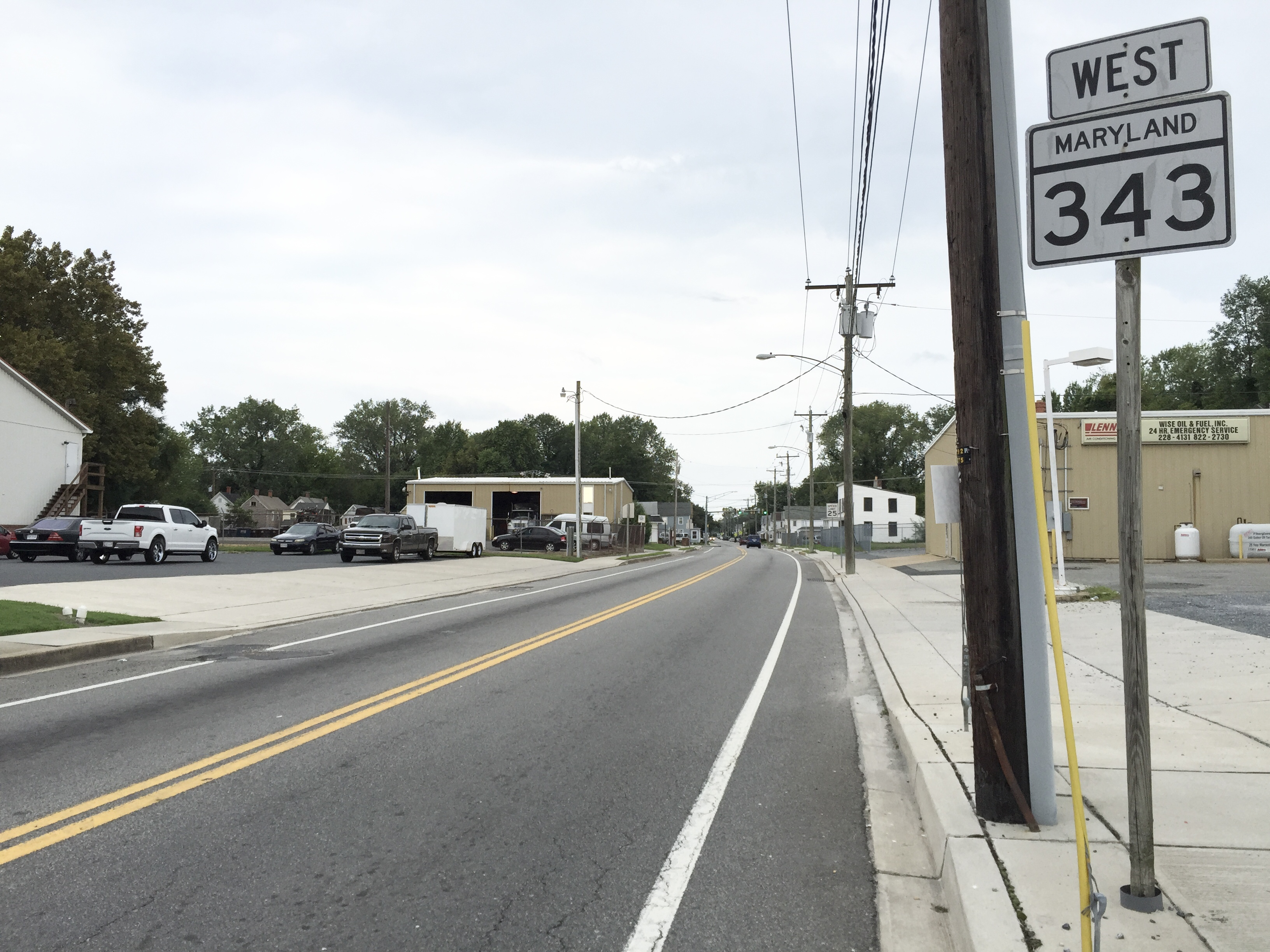
View west along MD 343 at MD 341 in Cambridge

MD 343 begins where state maintenance commences on Hudson Road a short distance west of Cook Point Road near the hamlet of Hudson. The state highway heads east as a two-lane undivided road through a mix of farmland and forest, intersecting roads that serve the peninsulas split by creeks that flow into the Choptank River to the north and the Little Choptank River to the south. MD 343 also passes through the hamlets of Cornersville and Lloyds. Shortly after passing Horns Point Road, which leads to a golf course and the Horn Point Laboratory of the University of Maryland Center for Environmental Science, the state highway passes a few residential subdivisions and enters the city limits of Cambridge, where the highway's name changes to Washington Street.

MD 343 intersects High Street, the old alignment of MD 343, before the route crosses Race Street, which heads south as MD 341 toward MD 16. The state highway continues east into an industrial area, where the highway crosses the Seaford Line of the Maryland and Delaware Railroad at-grade and meets the southern end of Dorchester Avenue. MD 343 continues east past Crusader Road to the highway's eastern terminus at US 50 (Sunburst Highway). Traffic on eastbound MD 343 must use Crusader Road to access westbound US 50.

MD 343 is a part of the National Highway System as a principal arterial within the city of Cambridge.

== History ==
Maryland Route 551
- Location: Cambridge
- Existed: c. 1946–1956

MD 343 was paved from the western city limit of Cambridge to Horns Point Road by 1921. The state highway was paved within Cambridge and extended west to Town Point Road by 1923. The state highway was extended to Lloyds in 1928 and was under construction west to Cornerville by 1930. MD 343 was completed to Hudson by 1933. The state highway followed its present path west of Cambridge. Within the city, MD 343 turned from Washington Street onto High Street into downtown Cambridge, where the state highway followed Poplar Street, Gay Street, Muse Street, and Market Street to the drawbridge across Cambridge Creek, which was completed in 1940, replacing an earlier drawbridge. From the drawbridge, the state highway followed Maryland Avenue east and Dorchester Avenue south to its eastern terminus at MD 16.

Following the completion of the Choptank River Bridge and Sunburst Highway in December 1935, MD 343's eastern terminus was changed to the intersection of Sunburst Highway and Maryland Avenue. Dorchester Avenue was redesignated MD 744 by 1950. By 1956, MD 343 was removed from downtown Cambridge and replaced MD 551 from High Street to its new eastern terminus at MD 16 at the corner of Washington and Race Streets. The drawbridge over Cambridge Creek remained under state maintenance and is today designated MD 795. Finally, MD 343 was extended east along Washington Street to its present eastern terminus at US 50 when MD 16 was moved to a new bypass of Cambridge in 1967.

== Junction list ==
The entire route is in Dorchester County.

Location	mi	km	Destinations	Notes
Hudson	0.00	0.00	Hudson Road west	Western terminus
Cambridge	10.37	16.69	MD 341 south (Race Street) / Race Street north – Church Creek	Northern terminus of MD 341
Cambridge	11.11	17.88	Crusader Road to US 50 west (Sunburst Highway) – Bay Bridge, Easton	
Cambridge	11.29	18.17	US 50 east (Sunburst Highway) – Salisbury	Eastern terminus; no direct access from eastbound MD 343 to westbound US 50
1.000 mi = 1.609 km; 1.000 km = 0.621 mi: Incomplete access

== Auxiliary routes ==
MD 343 has two unsigned auxiliary routes, both service roads near MD 343's eastern terminus where US 50 curves to the east heading from Easton to Salisbury. MD 343A is a 0.17-mile (0.27 km) spur from MD 343 that preserves Sunburst Highway's north–south alignment just east of Dorchester Avenue. MD 343B is a 0.09-mile (0.14 km) spur from MD 343 that continues the main highway's alignment from where it turns north to terminate at US 50.
