= Hickman, Maryland =

Unincorporated community in Maryland, U.S.

Coordinates: 38°50.0′N 75°43.4′W

Hickman is an unincorporated community in Caroline County, Maryland. It straddles the border with Kent County, Delaware, along Maryland Route 16.

The American Discovery Trail runs through the village.

== See also ==
- Hickman, Delaware
