= Two Johns, Maryland =

Unincorporated community in Maryland, U.S.

Coordinates: 38°49′18″N 75°51′44″W

Two Johns, is an unincorporated community on Maryland's Eastern Shore in Caroline County, Maryland, United States. It is situated on Maryland Route 16. The name derives from an early resident who was a vaudeville actor, John Stewart Crossy. He toured with John Hart and a series of other girthy men as the "Two Johns" or the "Fat Men's Club" during the height of his popularity. The village appears on the 1897 Map of Caroline County.
