= Edge Creek =

Bay in Talbot County, Maryland

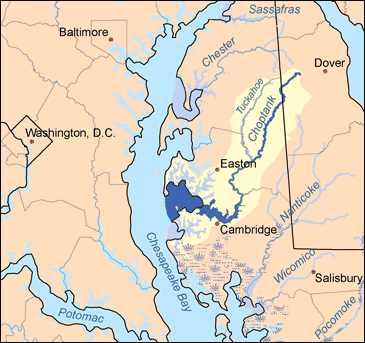
- Map of the rivers of the Eastern Shore of Maryland with the Choptank and its watershed highlighted

- Location within Maryland
- Interactive map of Edge Creek
- Location: Talbot County, Maryland
- Coordinates: 38°44′N 76°12.5′W
- Type: Bay
- Etymology: James Edge
- Part of: Choptank River Basin, Chesapeake Bay
- Primary outflows: Choptank River
- Basin countries: United States
- Settlements: Royal Oak, Maryland

Edge Creek is a bay in Talbot County, Maryland, in the United States. It is small tributary on the eastern edge of Broad Creek that flows from the north, dividing it from Leadenham Creek. The bay is surrounded by the peninsula of Royal Oak on three sides.

The water from Edge Creek flows into the Choptank River basin, continuing to the Chesapeake Bay.

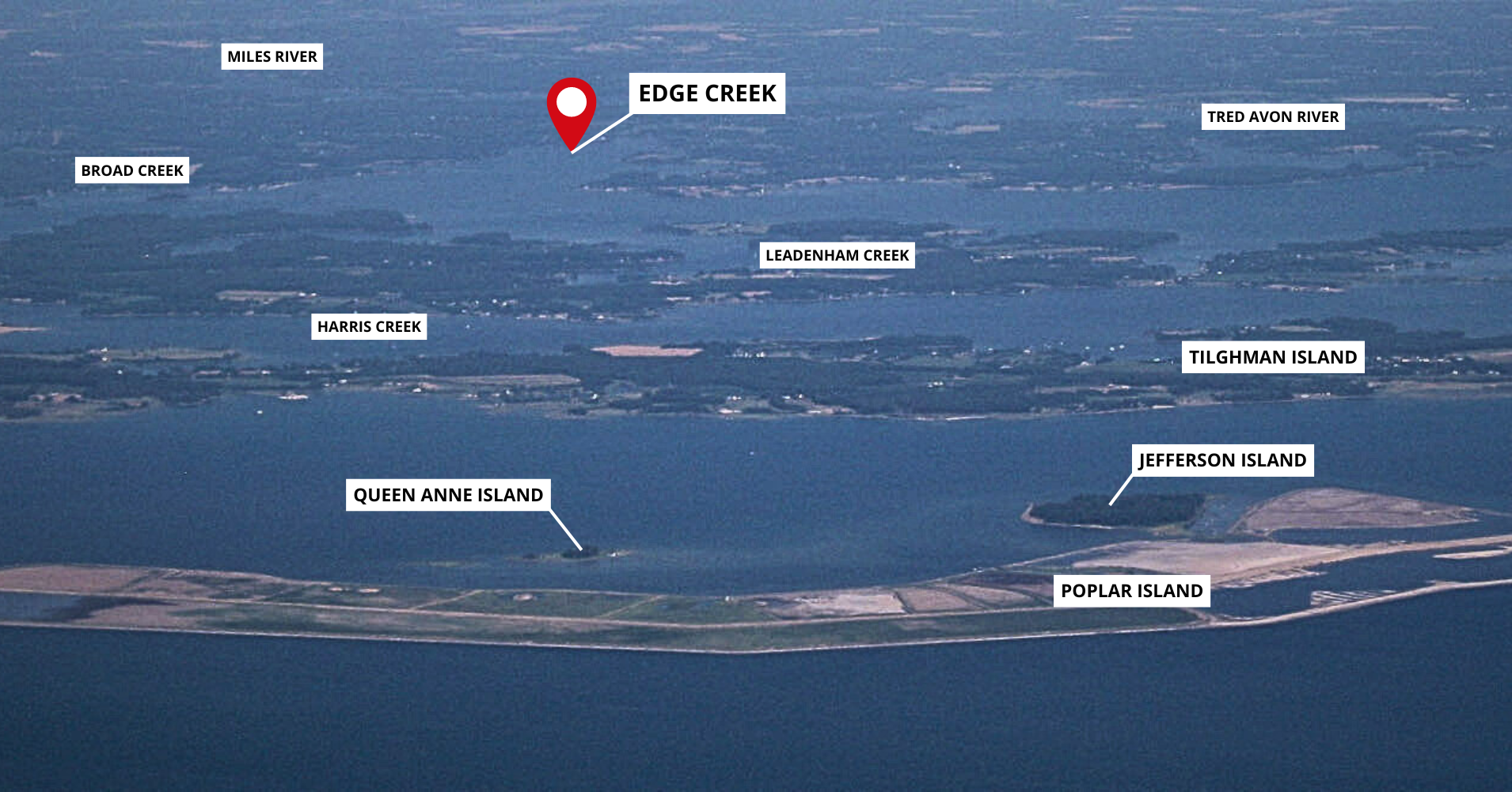
Location of Edge Creek

== Namesake ==
Edge Creek was named for James Edge (ca. 1710–1757, an 18th-century assessor. Edge immigrated to Maryland from England. On arrival in the county, he was a merchant, agent and factor for Richard Gildart, Esq., of Liverpool, England. He lived on the banks of the creek and owned property around which Edge Creek would be named. He did not have any natural born children. Upon his death, his nieces by marriage, Anne and Elizabeth Oldham inherited his property.

== See also ==
- Edge Hill, Liverpool, also named for the same Edge family
