= Waddells Corner, Maryland =

Coordinates: 38°39′05″N 075°54′11″W

Waddells Corner (also known as Waddles Corner) is a populated place in Dorchester County, Maryland, United States.

== See also ==
- Choptank, Maryland
