= Taylors Island Wildlife Management Area =

Wildlife Management Area in Maryland, US

Coordinates: 38°25′44.3″N 76°15′26.6″W

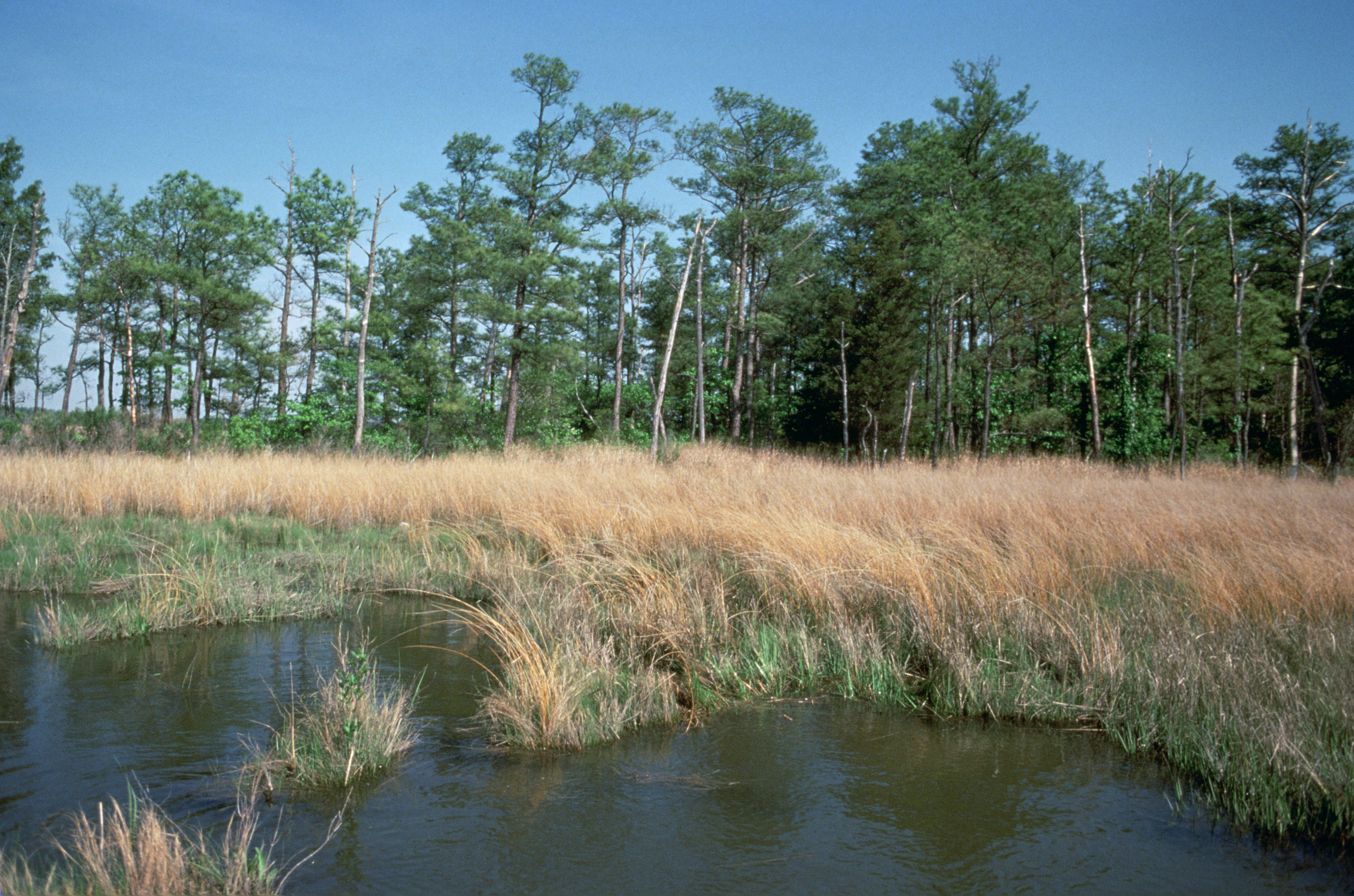
Eagles Nest Area, Taylor's Island

Taylors Island Wildlife Management Area is a Wildlife Management Area near the community of Taylors Island on the Eastern Shore of the state of Maryland, US.
