= Potter Hall =

Historic house in Maryland, United States

- U.S. National Register of Historic Places
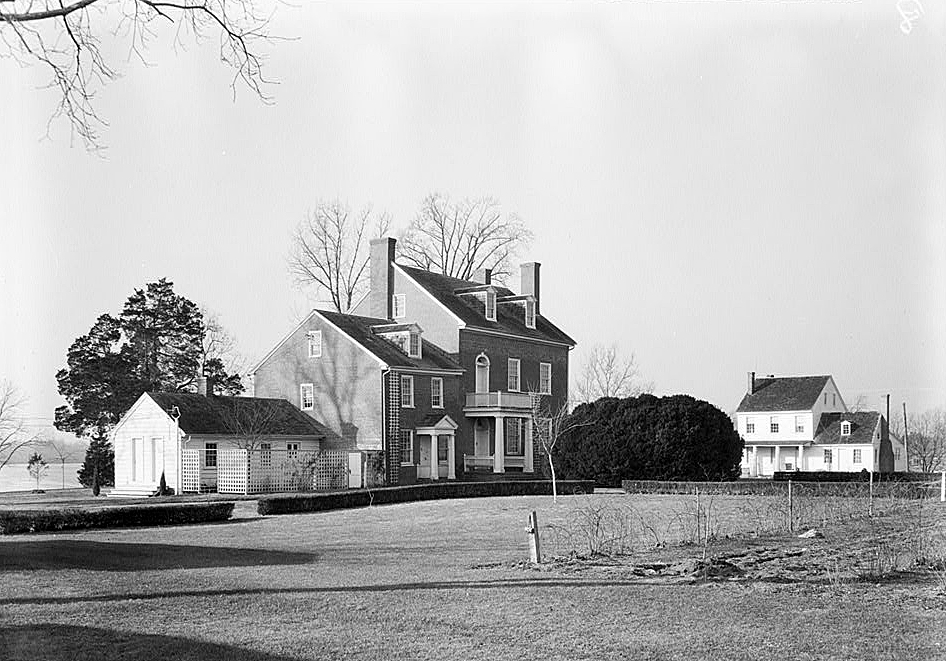
- Potter Hall land side in 1936

- Location within Maryland Location within the United States
- Location: Martin Lane, Williston, Maryland
- Coordinates: 38°49′52″N 75°51′10″W
- Area: 3.4 acres (1.4 ha)
- Built: 1808
- Architectural style: Federal
- NRHP reference No.: 82001590
- Added to NRHP: November 30, 1982

Potter Hall is a historic home located at Williston, Caroline County, Maryland, United States. It is an early-19th-century, Federal-influenced house facing the Choptank River. The house was constructed in three sections: a tall 2 1/2-story Flemish bond brick structure built about 1808 adjoining a lower 2 1/2-story, two-bay-wide central section built about 1750, also of Flemish bond brick, then a frame single-story kitchen wing added in 1930. Each of the three sections has a gable roof. Potter Hall was originally settled by Zabdiel Potter, who in the mid-18th century built a wharf and the small brick house. He developed Potter's Landing into a key early port for the shipping of tobacco to Baltimore.

Potter Hall was listed on the National Register of Historic Places in 1982.
