= James Sulivane =

Continental officer from Maryland, US

Captain James Sulivane (sometimes spelled Sullivane) was a 2nd lieutenant in the Continental Army during the American Revolutionary War. After the war's end, in 1785, he was the primary catalyst in the growth and development of present-day East New Market, Maryland.

== Background ==
Sulivane was born March 30, 1737, to Daniel Sullivane and Sarah Anderton possibly at East New Market's Friendship Hall in what was then pre-Revolution British America. Sulivane married Mary Ennalls in the early 1760s and had at least four children.

=== American War of Independence ===
Sulivane was also a prominent local figure in the American Revolutionary War. He served as a 2nd Lieutenant and Captain for a local militia group that he organized. The group was called "The New Market Blues". Sulivane later served as the Deputy Assistant Commissary for the Continental Army. As commissary, he would obtain arms, food, clothing, and other provisions for the army.

In 1775, James Sulivane, alongside Capt. Henry Travers, and Col. Henry Hooper were selected as delegates from Dorchester to attend the Annapolis Convention.

=== East New Market, Maryland ===
In 1776, Sulivane combined several tracts of land and resurveyed the 933-acre (3.78 km^{2}) tract as "Newmarket" in present-day East New Market, Maryland. In 1785, he carved out the town's first 20 lots on the northwest part of his property. Sulivane likely chose the name "New Market" because he had horse racing in mind and Newmarket, Suffolk was then among the most notable horse racing towns in England.

Horse racing had a short but prominent history in Newmarket, as it was then known. Horse racing was first mentioned as early as 1777 in a report by Thomas Sparrow to the Maryland Council of Safety, which read, "...I intended next to go to New Market, Dorchester County as I understood there was to be two days races, but my friends advised me not,..."

Over 12 horse racing notices from Maryland Herald and Eastern Shore Intelligencer and the Easton Republican Star dating from the 1790s to 1821 mention the races at Newmarket.

In 2006, Brian Tolley, a manager for a company engaged in aerial photography and satellite image processing, located the site of the race track using aerial photos from 1938 and 1957.

== See also ==
- Clement Sulivane, great grandson of James Sulivane
