= Choptank, Maryland =

- Census-designated place
- Location within Maryland
- Coordinates: 38°40′50″N 75°56′54″W
- Country: United States
- State: Maryland
- County: Caroline

Area
  - Total: 0.24 sq mi (0.62 km^{2})
  - Land: 0.24 sq mi (0.62 km^{2})
  - Water: 0 sq mi (0.00 km^{2})
- Elevation: 5 ft (1.5 m)

Population (2020)
  - Total: 126
  - Density: 529.5/sq mi (204.44/km^{2})
- Time zone: UTC−5 (Eastern (EST))
  - Summer (DST): UTC−4 (EDT)
- ZIP code: 21655
- Area code: 410
- FIPS code: 24-17000
- GNIS feature ID: 0589973

Choptank is an unincorporated town and census-designated place on the Eastern Shore of Maryland, in Caroline County, Maryland, United States. As of the 2010 census it had a population of 129.

The town was founded in the 17th century. It is located on the tidal Choptank River, which flows into the Chesapeake Bay. Tradition has it that the name "choptank" was an Anglicization of the Algonquian tshapetank and its namesake tribe.

The town is located at the southwestern corner of Caroline County on the northeast bank of the Choptank River, just north of where Hunting Creek enters the river from the east. The Choptank River flows southwest 11 miles (18 km) to the city of Cambridge and 25 miles (40 km) to the Chesapeake Bay. Choptank Road leads northeast 3 miles (5 km) to the town of Preston and the nearest state highways, Maryland Routes 16 and 331.

== Demographics ==
Historical population
Census	Pop.	Note	%±
2010	129		—
2020	126		−2.3%
U.S. Decennial Census
