= Ridgeton Farm =

Historic house in Maryland, United States

- U.S. National Register of Historic Places
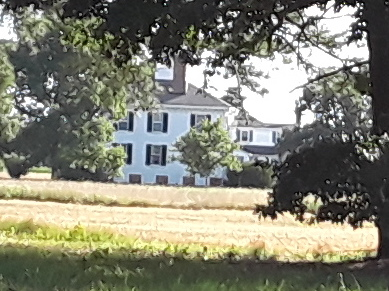
- House at Ridgeton Farm in July, 2018

- Location within Maryland Location within the United States
- Nearest city: Taylors Island, Maryland
- Coordinates: 38°27′39″N 76°18′24″W
- Area: 20 acres (8.1 ha)
- Built: 1857
- Built by: Fred Ridgeton
- Architectural style: Italianate
- NRHP reference No.: 77000694
- Added to NRHP: October 5, 1977

Ridgeton Farm is a historic home located at Taylor's Island, Dorchester County, Maryland, United States. It is an Italianate style, two story home built about 1857-1860 by the local architect Fred Ridgeton, who was quite unknown in the region. The house features a hip roof with a center gable, a widow's walk, and two huge interior chimneys. The property also includes a complex of 19th century barn and sheds.

Ridgeton Farm was listed on the National Register of Historic Places in 1977.
