= Williston Mill Historic District =

Historic mill complex in Maryland, United States

- U.S. National Register of Historic Places
- U.S. Historic district
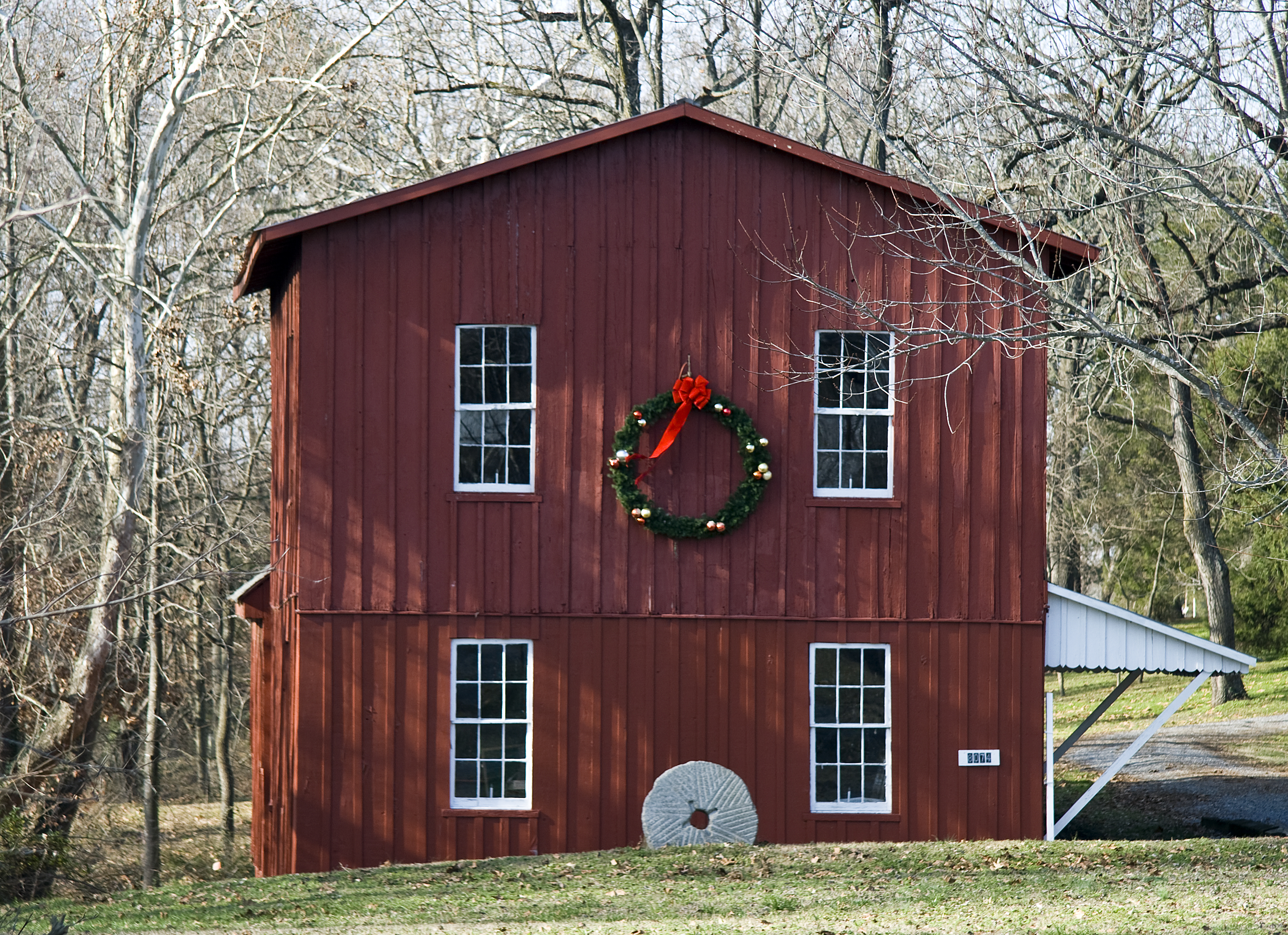
- Williston Mill

- Location within Maryland Location within the United States
- Location: 24729 Williston Rd., Denton, Maryland
- Coordinates: 38°49′46″N 75°50′50″W
- Area: 3 acres (1.2 ha)
- Built: 1830
- Architectural style: Greek Revival, Italianate
- NRHP reference No.: 02001576
- Added to NRHP: December 27, 2002

Williston Mill Historic District is a national historic district in Denton, Caroline County, Maryland, in the United States. It consists of two historic structures—a grist mill and a miller's house—which share the acreage with the mill stream and race that empties into Mill Creek, a tributary of the Choptank River. The Williston miller's house is a two-story, four-bay single-pile frame dwelling, built originally between 1840 and 1850 with later 19th century expansions. The mill building dates from around 1830–1840, with the two-story section built around 1895. It is one of two grist mills that remain standing in Caroline County.

It was added to the National Register of Historic Places in 2002.

An early morning fire on June 26, 2014, destroyed most of the grist mill. In 2015 it was decided that the grist mill would not be rebuilt.
