= East New Market Historic District =

Historic district in Maryland, United States

- U.S. National Register of Historic Places
- U.S. Historic district
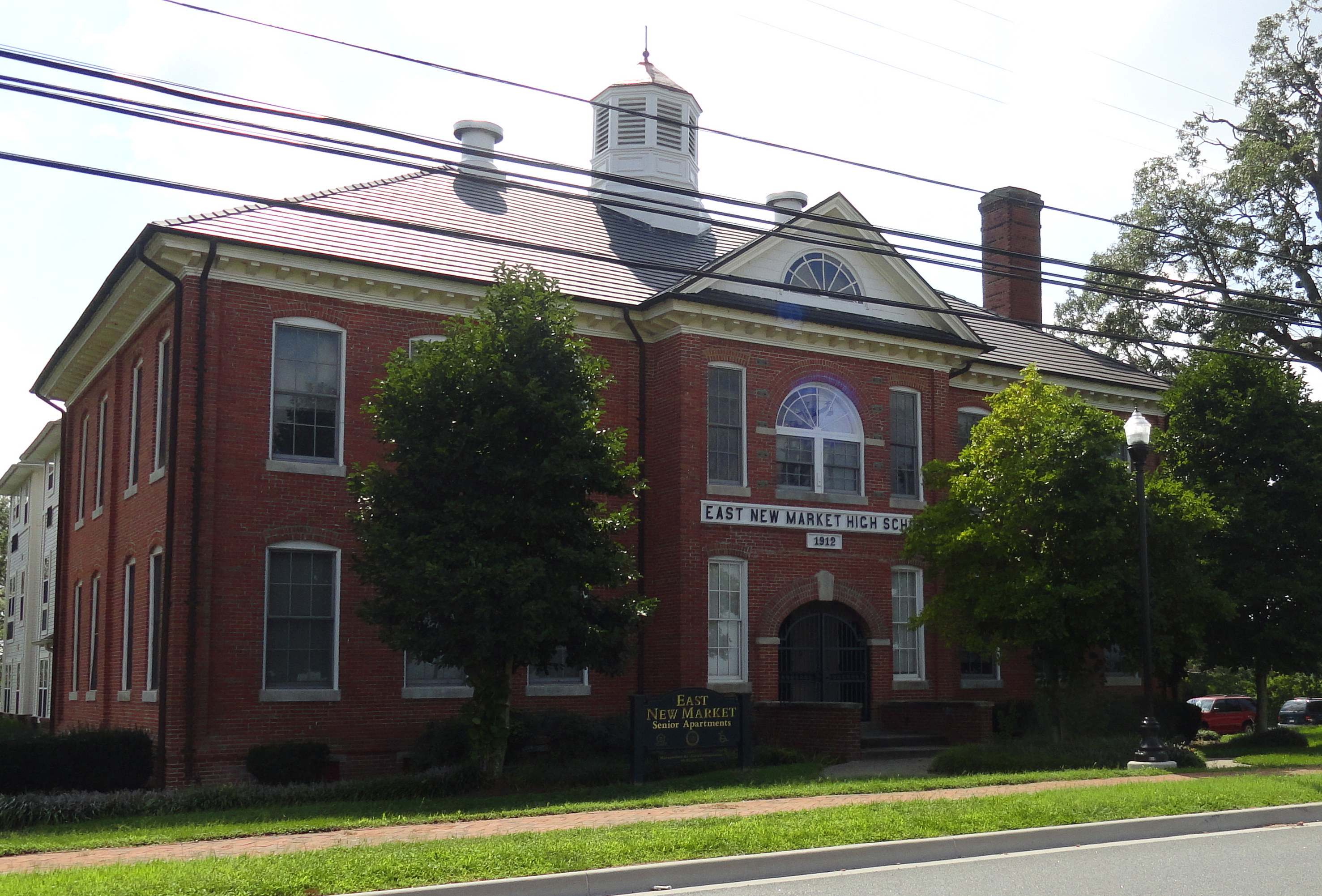
- East New Market High School

- Location within Maryland Location within the United States
- Location: MD 14 and MD 16, East New Market, Maryland
- Coordinates: 38°35′53″N 75°55′25″W
- Area: 300 acres (120 ha)
- Built: 1800
- Architectural style: Colonial Revival, Late Victorian, Federal
- NRHP reference No.: 75000889
- Added to NRHP: October 1, 1975

East New Market Historic District is a national historic district in East New Market, Dorchester County, Maryland. It consists of a village of about 75 buildings that represent a variety of 18th-, 19th-, and 20th-century architectural styles.

It was added to the National Register of Historic Places in 1975.
