= Choptank (Middletown, Delaware) =

Historic house in Delaware, US

- U.S. National Register of Historic Places
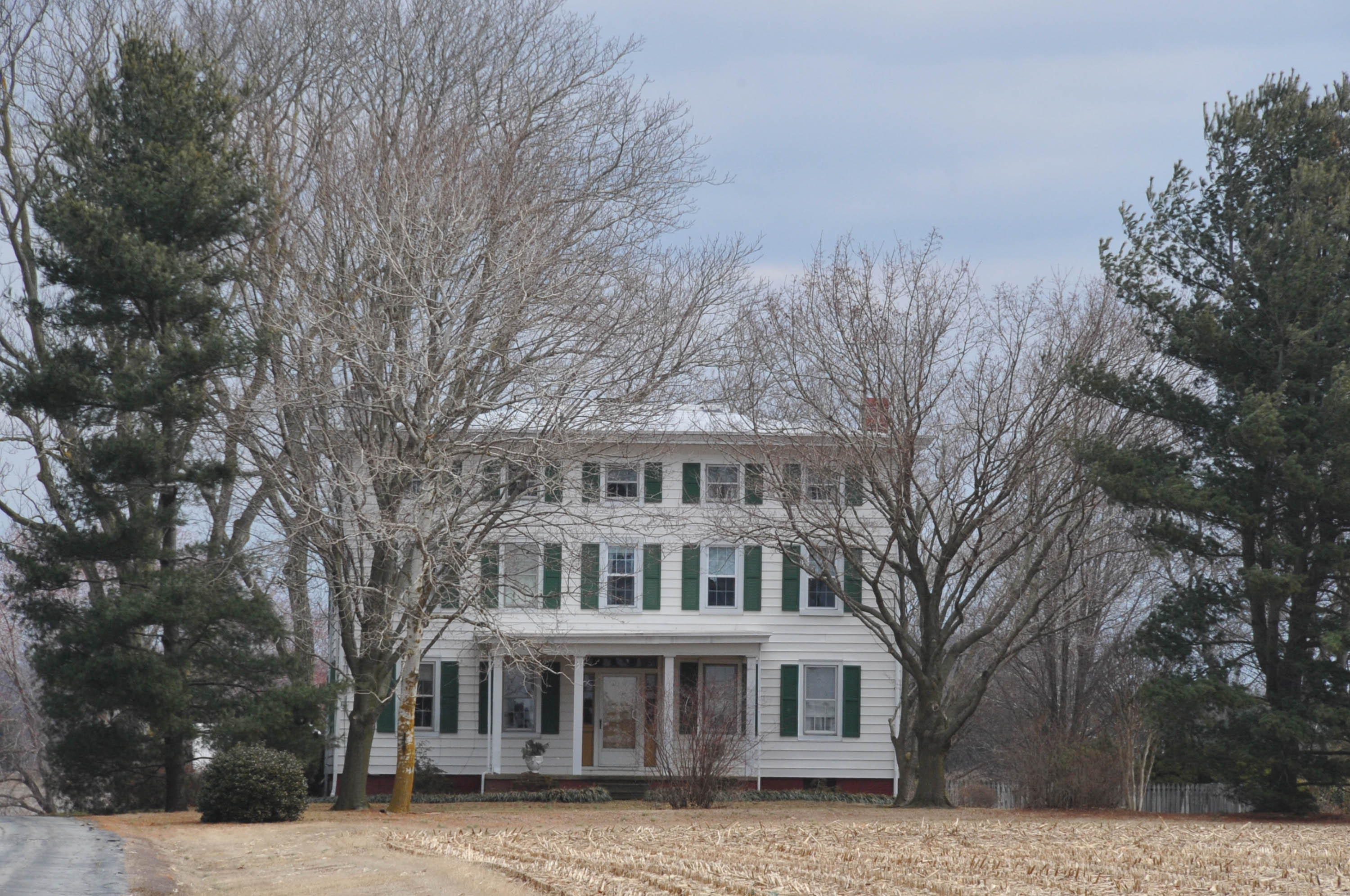
- Front of Choptank

- Location within Delaware Location within the United States
- Location: 1542 Choptank Road in St. Georges Hundred, near Middletown, Delaware
- Coordinates: 39.496833°N 75.740039°W
- Area: 8 acres (3.2 ha)
- Built: 1850
- Architectural style: Late Victorian, Greek Revival, Federal
- MPS: Rebuilding St. Georges Hundred 1850--1880 TR
- NRHP reference No.: 85002108
- Added to NRHP: September 13, 1985

Choptank, also known as the J. Clayton Farm, is a historic home located near Middletown in New Castle County, Delaware, United States. It was built about 1850, and is a three-story, five-by-two bay, timber-frame structure on a brick foundation. It has a low-hipped roof. Also on the property are a contributing large barn, corn crib, and shed.

It was listed on the National Register of Historic Places in 1985.
