= Linchester Mill =

- U.S. National Register of Historic Places
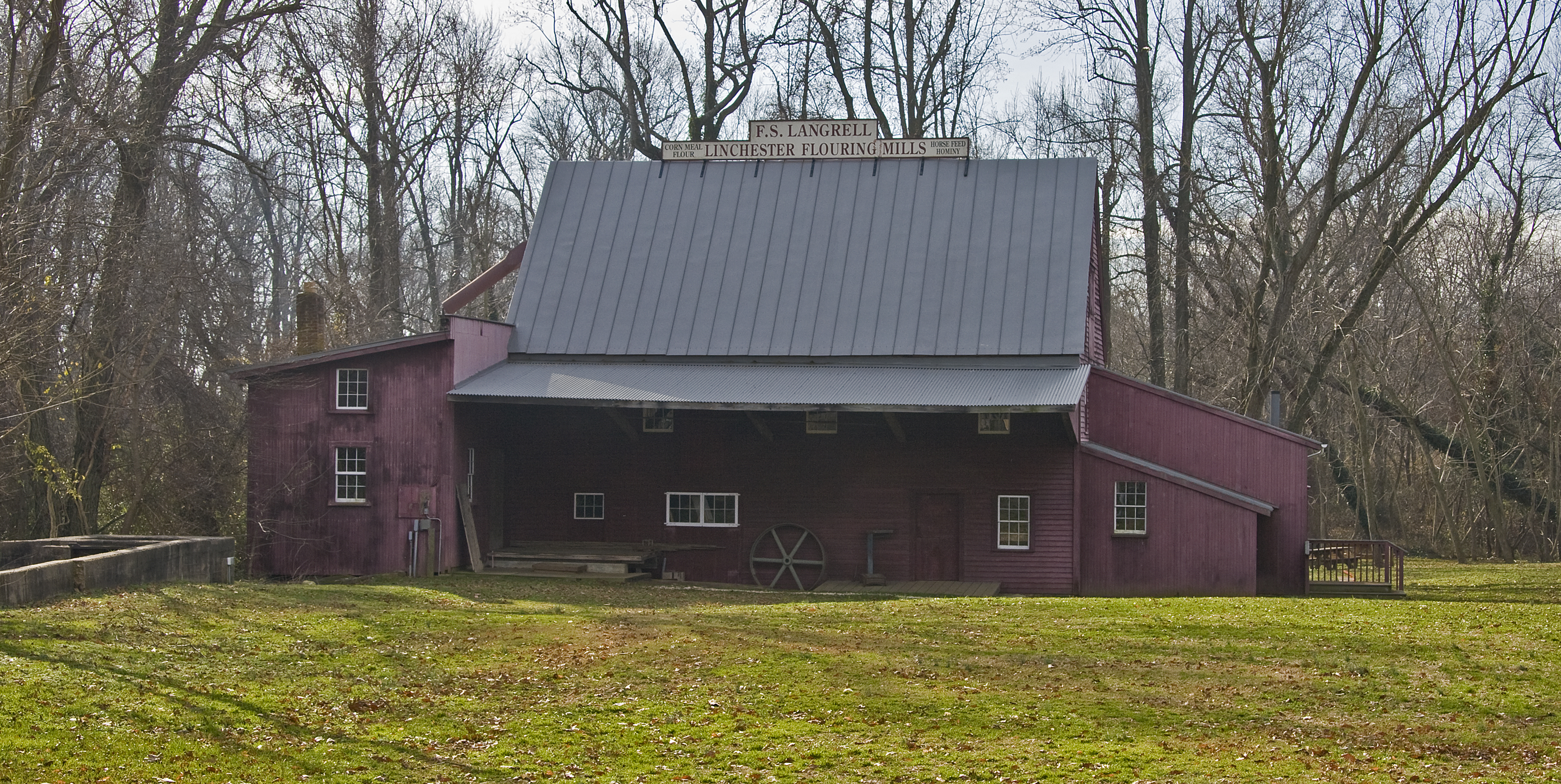
- Linchester Mill, December 2011

- Location within Maryland Location within the United States
- Nearest city: 3395 Linchester Rd., Preston, Maryland
- Coordinates: 38°42′02.54″N 75°53′50.65″W
- Area: 15 acres (6.1 ha)
- Built: 1840
- Architectural style: Greek Revival
- NRHP reference No.: 09001148
- Added to NRHP: December 23, 2009

Linchester Mill is a historic grist mill located at Preston in Caroline County, Maryland, United States. The original mill was built at the site in about 1682; the current structure was erected in approximately 1840 and is a 2 1/2-story frame building sided in red-painted weatherboard and roofed with raised-seam metal. It is four bays long and two bays deep, with a two-story lean-to addition. Then known as Langrell's Mill, operations ceased in 1974 but currently houses a museum collection of milling machinery dating from the 19th century to the mid-20th century.

It was listed on the National Register of Historic Places in 2009 after renovations began in 2004.
