= Taylors Island, Maryland =

- Census-designated place
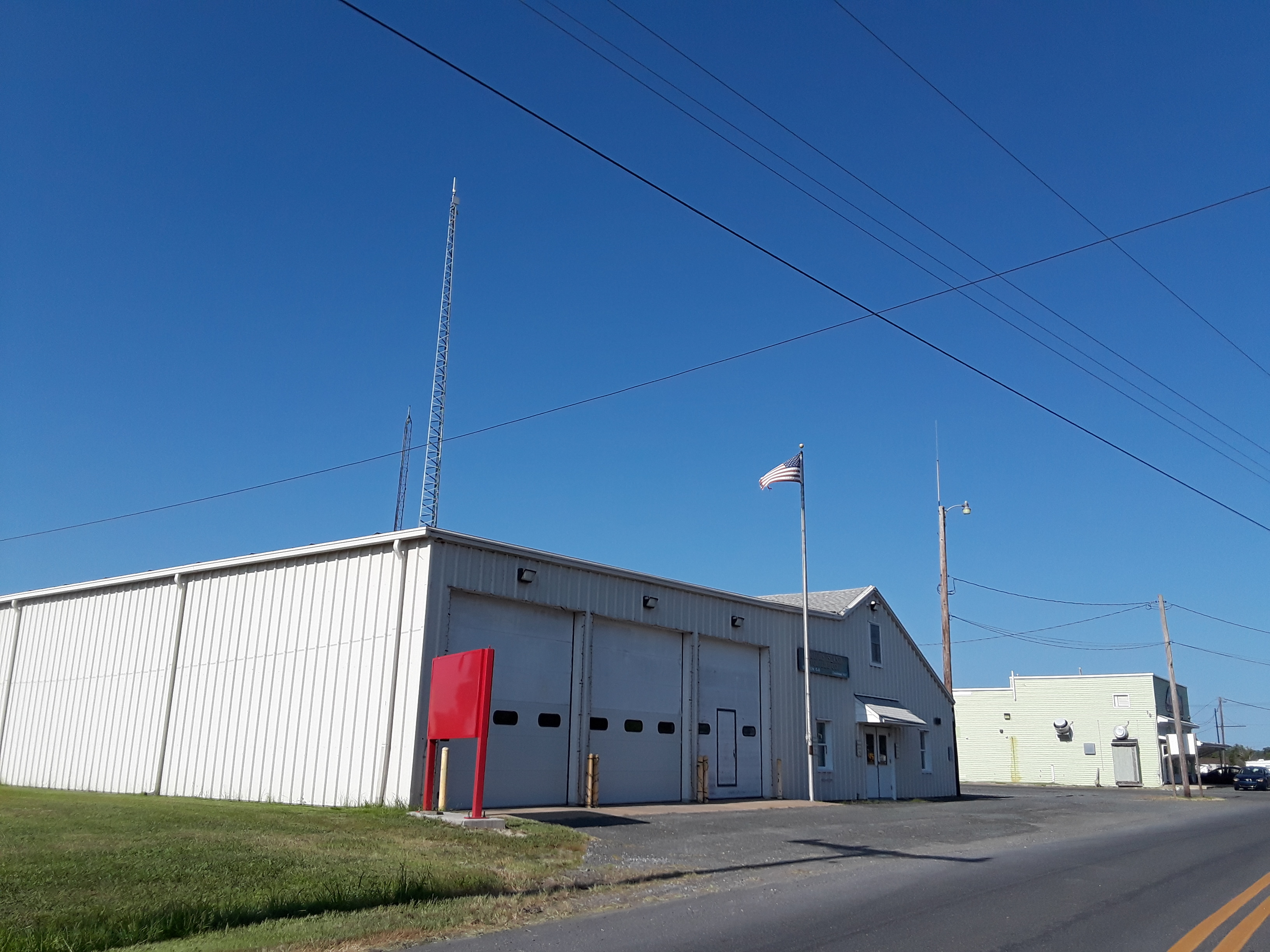

- Location in Maryland Taylors Island (the United States)
- Coordinates: 38°28′8″N 76°17′56″W
- Country: United States
- State: Maryland
- County: Dorchester

Area
  - Total: 4.16 sq mi (10.78 km^{2})
  - Land: 4.14 sq mi (10.73 km^{2})
  - Water: 0.019 sq mi (0.05 km^{2})
- Elevation: 3.0 ft (0.9 m)

Population (2020)
  - Total: 125
  - Density: 30.2/sq mi (11.65/km^{2})
- Time zone: UTC−5 (Eastern (EST))
  - Summer (DST): UTC−4 (EDT)
- ZIP code: 21669
- Area codes: 410, 443, and 667
- FIPS code: 24-76925
- GNIS feature ID: 591395

Taylors Island is an unincorporated community and census-designated place in Dorchester County, Maryland, United States, in the state's Eastern Shore region. The population was 173 at the 2010 census. It is known for hunting, crabbing and fishing. Ridgeton Farm was listed on the National Register of Historic Places in 1977. Bethlehem Methodist Episcopal Church and Grace Episcopal Church Complex were listed in 1979.

== Geography ==
Taylors Island is in western Dorchester County on the eastern shore of the Chesapeake Bay. It is separated from the mainland on the east by Slaughter Creek. Maryland Route 16 leads northeast from Taylors Island 16 miles (26 km) to Cambridge, the Dorchester County seat.

According to the United States Census Bureau, the Taylors Island CDP occupies the central, northern, and western parts of the island. The CDP has a total area of 4.2 square miles (10.8 km^{2}), of which 0.02 square miles (0.05 km^{2}), or 0.47%, is water.

== Demographics ==
Historical population
Census	Pop.	Note	%±
2010	173		—
2020	125		−27.7%
U.S. Decennial Census

== See also ==
- Taylors Island Wildlife Management Area
