= Grace Episcopal Church Complex (Taylor's Island, Maryland) =

Historic church in Maryland, United States

- U.S. National Register of Historic Places
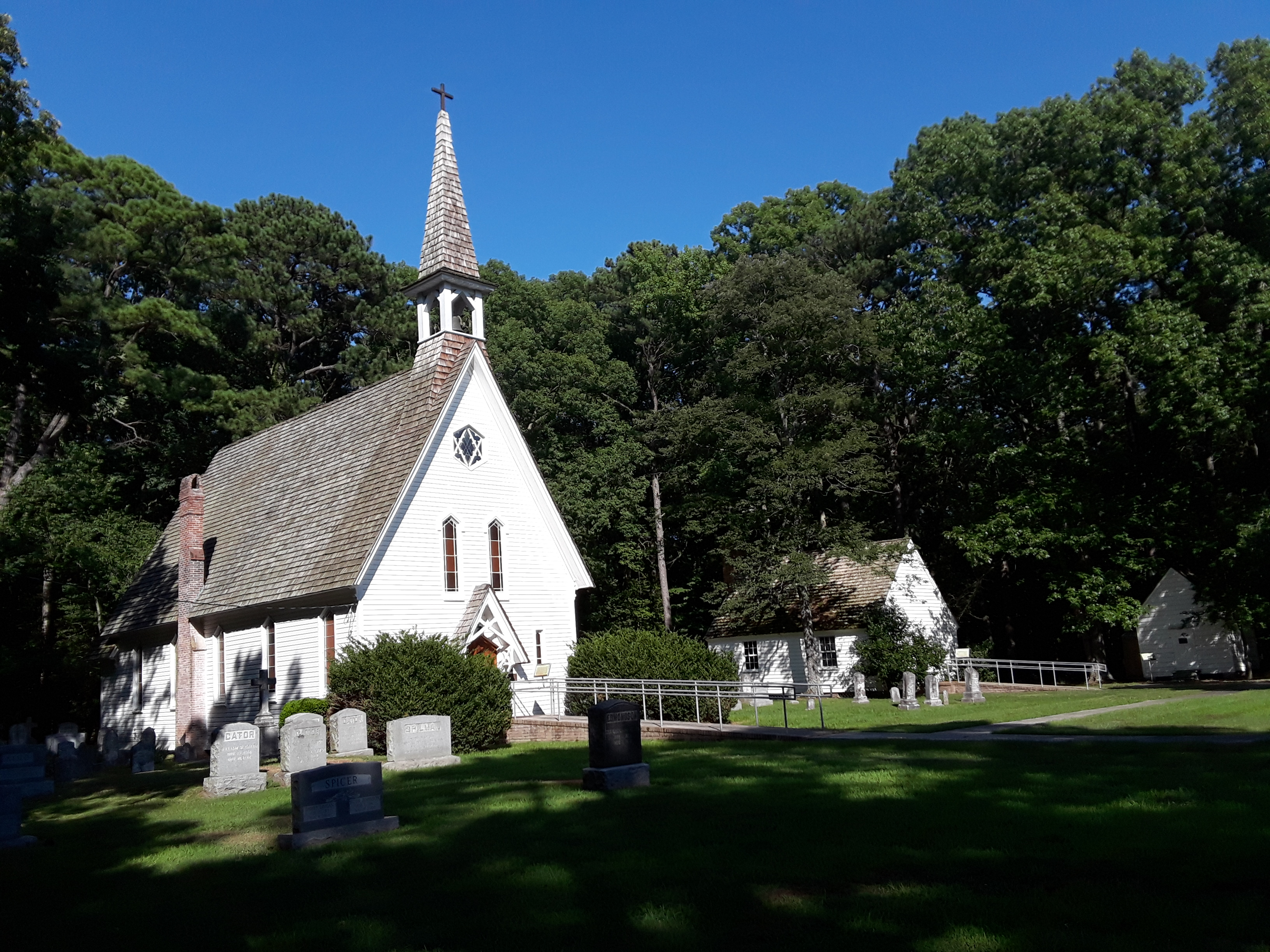
- View of the complete complex, showing the church, the former chapel of ease, and the schoolhouse. Taken in July 2018.

- Location within Maryland Location within the United States
- Location: Hooper Neck Rd., Taylors Island, Maryland
- Coordinates: 38°28′15″N 76°18′32″W
- Area: 2 acres (0.81 ha)
- Built: 1820
- Architectural style: Gothic, Carpenter Gothic
- NRHP reference No.: 79001127
- Added to NRHP: July 24, 1979

The Grace Episcopal Church Complex is a historic Episcopal church located at Taylor's Island, Dorchester County, Maryland, United States. The complex consists of three frame structures: a schoolhouse, chapel of ease, and Grace Episcopal Church. The chapel of ease dates from the first quarter of the 19th century and is a 20 foot by 30 foot frame structure in the Carpenter Gothic style. The school building was moved to its present site by the Grace Foundation in 1955, and was the first school house in Dorchester County and was built and used on Taylor's Island. Grace Episcopal Church is a frame structure built in the late 19th century in the Victorian Gothic style.

Grace Episcopal Church was listed on the National Register of Historic Places in 1979.
