= Bethlehem Methodist Episcopal Church =

Historic church in Maryland, US

- U.S. National Register of Historic Places
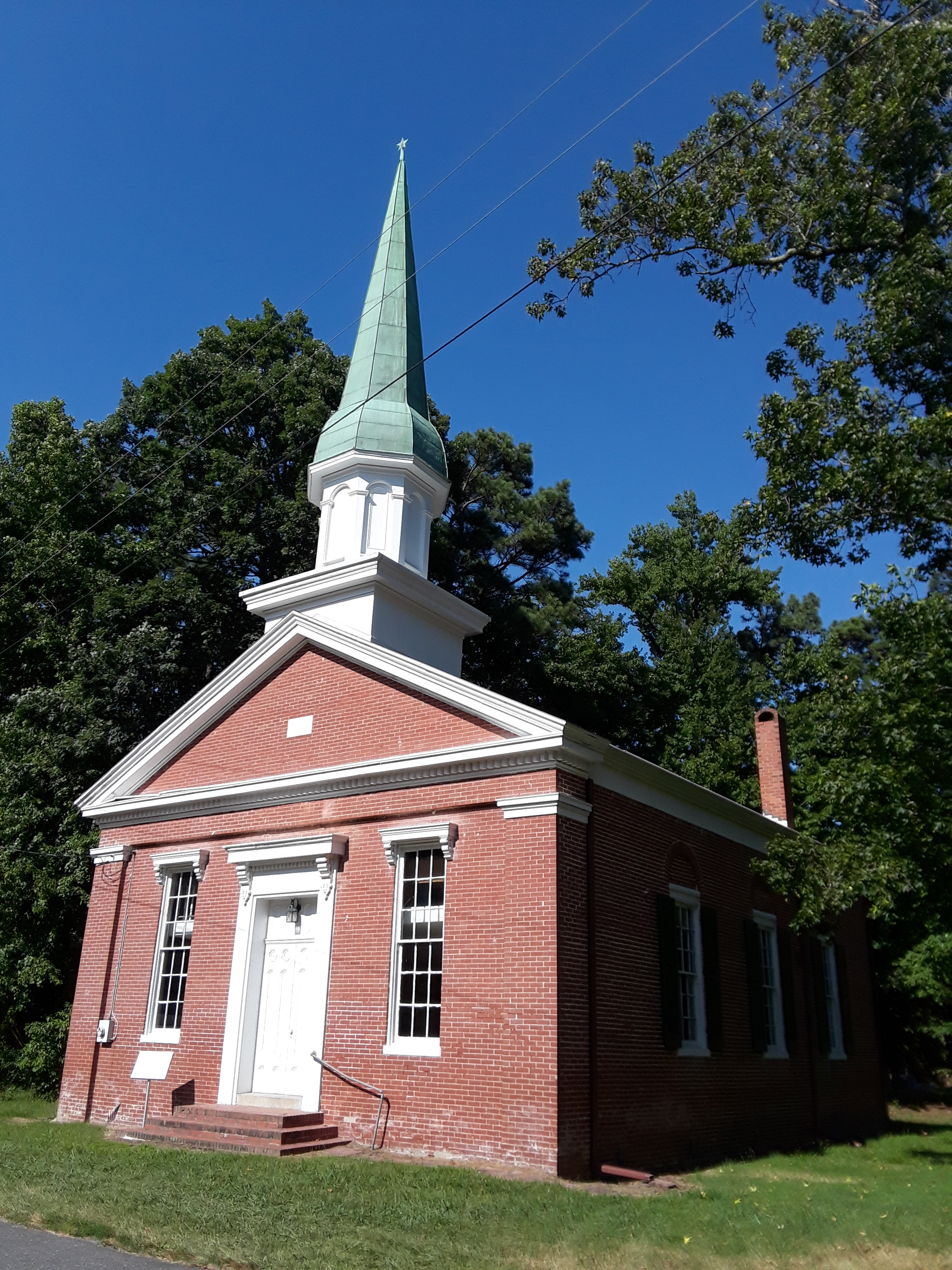
- Front of the church, July 2018

- Location within Maryland Location within the United States
- Location: Hoopers Neck Rd., Taylor's Island, Maryland
- Coordinates: 38°28′56″N 76°18′58″W
- Area: 2.4 acres (0.97 ha)
- Built: 1857
- Architectural style: Gothic Revival; Victorian
- NRHP reference No.: 79001126
- Added to NRHP: June 7, 1979

Bethlehem Methodist Episcopal Church is a historic Methodist church located at Bethlehem, Taylor's Island, Dorchester County, Maryland. It was built in 1857, and is a gable-front common bond brick church across the road from a mid-19th century cemetery.

The Gothic Revival Victorian church has an octagonal belfry above which is an octagonal dome with a spire superimposed and covered in copper, making it look like an inverted ice cream cone. It is the best example of a mid-19th century Methodist chapel in Dorchester County and retains its original interior.

It was listed on the National Register of Historic Places in 1979.
