= Whitehall, Dorchester County, Maryland =

Unincorporated community in Maryland, United States

Whitehall, Maryland
- Unincorporated community
- Location within Maryland
- Coordinates: 38°33′40″N 76°00′48″W
- Country: United States
- State: Maryland
- County: Dorchester
- Elevation: 13 ft (4.0 m)
- Time zone: UTC-5 (Eastern (EST))
  - Summer (DST): UTC-4 (EDT)
- Area codes: 410 & 443
- GNIS feature ID: 596743

Whitehall is an unincorporated community in Dorchester County, Maryland, United States. Whitehall is 3.5 miles (5.6 km) east of Cambridge.
