= Memory Lane (Denton, Maryland) =

Historic house in Maryland, United States

- U.S. National Register of Historic Places
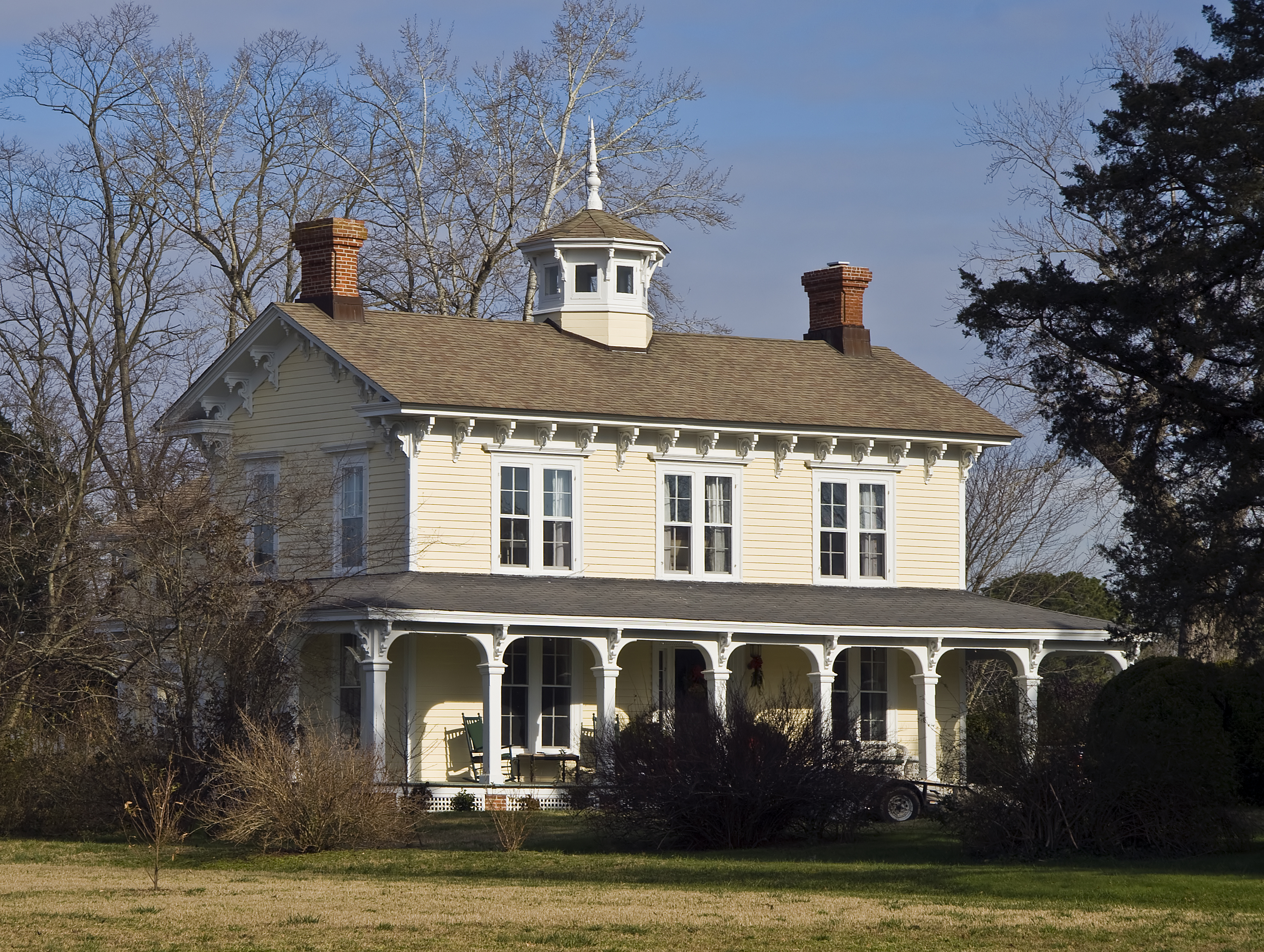
- Memory Lane, December 2011

- Location within Maryland Location within the United States
- Location: 24700 Williston Rd., Denton, Maryland
- Coordinates: 38°49′51″N 75°50′54″W
- Area: 5 acres (2.0 ha)
- Built: 1864
- Architectural style: Italianate
- NRHP reference No.: 00001200
- Added to NRHP: October 12, 2000

Memory Lane is a historic home located at Denton, Caroline County, Maryland. It a 2 1/2-story, frame Italianate-style house constructed in 1864. Notable exterior features include extensive porches, decorative brackets, and an octagonal cupola. The entire front facade features a wraparound porch.

Memory Lane was listed on the National Register of Historic Places in 2000.
