= East New Market, Maryland =

- Town
- Seal

- Location of East New Market, Maryland
- Coordinates: 38°35′46″N 75°55′25″W
- Country: United States
- State: Maryland
- County: Dorchester
- Incorporated: 1832

Area
  - Total: 0.40 sq mi (1.04 km^{2})
  - Land: 0.40 sq mi (1.04 km^{2})
  - Water: 0 sq mi (0.00 km^{2})
- Elevation: 39 ft (12 m)

Population (2020)
  - Total: 389
  - Density: 973.0/sq mi (375.68/km^{2})
- Time zone: UTC-5 (Eastern (EST))
  - Summer (DST): UTC-4 (EDT)
- ZIP code: 21631
- Area code: 410
- FIPS code: 24-24450
- GNIS feature ID: 0590123
- Website: townofeastnewmarket.org

East New Market is a town located in Dorchester County, Maryland, United States. As of the 2020 census, East New Market had a population of 389. The ZIP code is 21631.

== Geography ==
East New Market is located at 38°35′46″N 75°55′25″W (38.596219, -75.923613).

According to the United States Census Bureau, the town has a total area of 0.40 square miles (1.04 km^{2}), all land.

The town is located approximately six miles northeast of Cambridge, the seat for its home County of Dorchester. It is intersected by state highway routes 14 and 16; and may be found along the hypotenuse of a triangle running from Cambridge to Easton and from Easton to Salisbury, putting East New Market some 22 and 26 miles from those county seats of Talbot and Wicomico counties respectively. It also sits somewhat south of Denton, the county seat of Caroline County. [See any standard Md. issue Highway map for verification.]. This puts the town within relatively easy reach of four county seats in the rural areas where these counties join or are close by.

== Demographics ==
Historical population
Census	Pop.	Note	%±
1880	242		—
1900	282		—
1910	280		−0.7%
1920	271		−3.2%
1930	222		−18.1%
1940	267		20.3%
1950	264		−1.1%
1960	225		−14.8%
1970	251		11.6%
1980	230		−8.4%
1990	153		−33.5%
2000	167		9.2%
2010	400		139.5%
2020	389		−2.7%
U.S. Decennial Census

=== 2010 census ===
As of the census of 2010, there were 400 people, 169 households, and 99 families residing in the town. The population density was 1,000.0 inhabitants per square mile (386.1/km^{2}). There were 197 housing units at an average density of 492.5 per square mile (190.2/km^{2}). The racial makeup of the town was 80.5% White and 19.5% African American. Hispanic or Latino of any race were 2.0% of the population.

There were 169 households, of which 30.8% had children under the age of 18 living with them, 42.0% were married couples living together, 12.4% had a female householder with no husband present, 4.1% had a male householder with no wife present, and 41.4% were non-families. 37.9% of all households were made up of individuals, and 23.1% had someone living alone who was 65 years of age or older. The average household size was 2.37 and the average family size was 3.13.

The median age in the town was 39.6 years. 22.5% of residents were under the age of 18; 7.4% were between the ages of 18 and 24; 28.4% were from 25 to 44; 22.7% were from 45 to 64; and 19.5% were 65 years of age or older. The gender makeup of the town was 49.5% male and 50.5% female.

=== 2000 census ===
As of the 2000 census, there were 167 people, 75 households, and 44 families residing in the town. The population density was 674.8 inhabitants per square mile (260.5/km^{2}). There were 97 housing units at an average density of 391.9 per square mile (151.3/km^{2}). The racial makeup of the town was 96.41% White, 2.40% African American, 1.20% from other races. Hispanic or Latino of any race were 2.40% of the population.

There were 75 households, out of which 16.0% had children under the age of 18 living with them, 48.0% were married couples living together, 9.3% had a female householder with no husband present, and 41.3% were non-families. 33.3% of all households were made up of individuals, and 18.7% had someone living alone who was 65 years of age or older. The average household size was 2.23 and the average family size was 2.93.

In the town, the population was spread out, with 16.2% under the age of 18, 8.4% from 18 to 24, 26.9% from 25 to 44, 30.5% from 45 to 64, and 18.0% who were 65 years of age or older. The median age was 44 years. For every 100 females, there were 101.2 males. For every 100 females age 18 and over, there were 94.4 males.

The median income for a household in the town was $50,417, and the median income for a family was $56,429. Males had a median income of $36,250 versus $21,389 for females. The per capita income for the town was $22,374. None of the families and 2.3% of the population were living below the poverty line, including no under eighteens and 7.1% of those over 64.

== History ==
=== 18th century ===
Long referred to as Newmarket, the town arose from its beginnings in the late 17th and early 18th centuries to be a social and commercial center serving the northern hinterland region of Dorchester County, Maryland into the early 20th century. It was an early locale for education. During the Great Awakening, Methodist preachers generated interest and created a majority of Methodist members in the region. They worked to convince slaveholders to free their slaves, and some did in this region. Changes in agriculture reduced the need for laborers. As a result, this area had one of the state's largest free-black populations per capita. Before the war, Methodists in the North and South split over the issue of slavery. Southern Methodists had come to accept it and believed that Christianity could be applied to a system with paternal values of protection. The church split before the war, as Northern Methodists opposed slavery.

The town was active during the American Revolutionary War, the War of 1812, and the American Civil War. The granaries of Col. James Sulivane (commissary officer during the American Revolutionary War) and a regiment of militia known as the "New Market Blues" were integral to the County's as well as the colony's/State's efforts in the revolution.

The town is notable for an unusually broad span of architectural styles, most dating from the late 18th century through the early 20th century. The town's history spans a period from the pre-Columbian to the modern.

Much of the Native American Indian remains are thought to be lost. The town was developed along the Nanticoke path from the Choptank Indian "Fort". It became a center of commercial crossroads of the Eastern Shore of Maryland, located on the main north-south route. The town had boarding houses, hotels and other such facilities to serve travelers and residents. The "Bramble House," the "Old Brick Hotel," and "The Chesadale" are three that served travelers for more than a century. Construction of a rail line increased travelers to the town, who got off at the depot on the east side.

The construction of the "Governor Emerson C. Harrington Bridge", linking Easton to Cambridge and on to Salisbury, made the routes through East New Market secondary to the main flow of traffic. The opening of the bridge was attended by President Franklin Delano Roosevelt, who dedicated the structure.

Originally settled by colonists at what had become the juncture of several plantation, the town was named as "New Market", as recorded in a land patent and resurvey granted by patent from the Lord proprietor's land office to James Sulivane in May 1776, just prior to the issuance of the American Declaration of Independence. Some of the older grant names were "York," "Bath," "Westward," "Buckland," "Buckland Regulated," "Debate Enlarged," "Melvill's Meadow," "Sulivane's Meadow," "Hooper's Outlet," and "Anderton's Desire." At this point several of the more prominent families and their homes were located in the midst of what is now the town. Sulivane gained control of some early land grants by purchase, marriage and inheritance over a number of years. With these various parcels, Sulivane created a single tract for which the new survey or re-survey was granted.

In one section of the new resurvey, Sulivane changed the course of the road that constitutes the southern portion of the main street from its current intersection (Md. routes 14 and 16 as of 2006) to a subsequent bend and now fork in that road. On either side of this section, he platted a series of numbered lots and sold them off as building lots. The vacant lots ran from just south of what is now the intersection of Md. Routes 16 and 14 to a bend of the main street leading out of town and toward Cambridge. The oldest extant structure of European origins may date to the 1690s; it was added on to in the 1790s and became known as "Temperance House", "The Old Brick Hotel", "Mitchell-Daffin House", or "House of the Hinges".

"Friendship Hall" and "Buckland" have been dated to the mid-18th century. Early histories have erroneously ascribed all of the great early homes to the Sulivane family.

Such works as Jones's History of Dorchester County and "The Laskowski Papers" have errors of attribution.

The greater area was the home of Civil War-era and Union-sympathizer Maryland Governor Thomas Holliday Hicks. Hicks served in several different elected offices before being elected Governor of Maryland. He was one of the last nationally prominent Whig office holders. Later, he became a member of the American Nativist Party (sometimes known as the "Know-Nothing Party"), and served as governor and as a United States Senator during the last years of his life. He is considered integral to Maryland's refusal to secede from the Union.

The town was established as early as 1783, when the State Legislature authorized the payment for a road "... from the main road from Newmarket to Vienna to the grist-mill of Michael Hall Bonwill, and thence till it intersect the main road from Cambridge to Vienna." (Hanson's Laws of Maryland 1763-1784, Volume 203, Page 361, 1783, CHAP. XIV). (By analogy, Dorchester County marks the year of its organization as 1668, not from a formal creation but from the date on a writ to sheriff of the County of Dorset.)

=== 19th century ===
An 1803 state statute authorizes Newmarket to control certain ranging livestock. While this is not granting a town charter, the wording suggests there was a body of incorporated municipal leadership.

In 1805, the state legislature authorized the Levy Court for Dorchester County to appoint a bailiff for "New-Market", specifying qualifications for the office and enumerating powers and jurisdiction.

In 1832, the first formal charter incorporating the town is found, incorporated under the name of "East New Market". This by no means that this was the first incorporation but rather the first that can be found. Boundaries for the town were set at ½ mile as measured from an intersection of what was called LeCompte's Tavern. Later, a reincorporation in 1860 reduced the limits to ⅓ of a mile but still measured from "...the tavern house known as " James Lecompte's" or the " frame tavern" each way;..."

The idea of tracing the town's incorporation date is not dissimilar from Dorchester County itself, which traces its establishment from 1668 and the issuance of a writ from the Governor's council to the Sheriff of Dorsett. The formal setting-aside of the county has been lost.

The appellation "East" had been added in 1803 with the establishment of a post office. The change was made by the United States Postal Service to distinguish it from the town of New Market in Frederick County, and areas of Baltimore, Kent, and Talbot Counties Maryland as well as from several other areas up and down the Atlantic seaboard. Among most longtime residents, the emphasis upon the pronunciation of the town's name is on the word New, perhaps reflecting the pronunciation of the original name.

A committed forward-thinking leadership remained active over the expanse of time. By the outbreak of World War I, the town already had its first bank, electric company, water company, and fire brigade. It had its own sanitary sewer system by the 1930s.

With a congregation dating back to the period prior to the "Christmas Conference of 1784", what is currently believed to have been the first Methodist meeting house in the town was established in 1810 and known as "Union Chapel". Francis Asbury, 1st Bishop of the American Methodist (Episcopal) Church, held quarterly conferences there and noted in his journal enemy activity locally during the War of 1812. The chapel was built with an adjoining graveyard. A Greek revival structure was built circa 1848 at new location in the town and named "Trinity" replacing "Union Chapel" and with a separate cemetery on the town's outskirts established which some have come to believe was inspired by the "Cemetery Movement" of the period.

Members of the Methodist movement had, from early on met in various places ranging from the homes of members to meeting houses provided for their use. From such a congregation, meeting in the home of one "Brother Ayers," the congregation gave rise to the seat of the Dorchester Circuit when it was formally created in 1804. From that circuit various circuits were later carved but records, as was customary church practice, always remained with the church that sat as the seat of the circuit. In this case seat of The Dorchester Circuit was with the congregation in New Market with its place of worship at Union Chapel and its later successor Trinity. Thus it is in effect the "mother circuit" to all others set off from the Dorchester Circuit.

Union Chapel is the first known structure of the Methodist congregation in East New Market being built around 1810. It is believed to have been a frame structure with an attendant burial ground and sat on what is known in the 20th century as School or Academy Street, i.e. Md. State Rt. 14 and Creamery Road. This structure served the congregation in the 1840s when a series of events marked a major shift in the church's and the local congregation's status.

In 1844, the split within the Methodist Church in the United States took place over the issue over the issue of slavery at its General Conference. Between 1845 and 1848 land was donated by the Hicks family for a new church which resulted in the construction of what became known as Trinity Church (cornerstone bearing date 1848). Trinity Church is a rectangular structure in a modest Greek revival style featuring a prominent oversized corner pilasters and a central pavilion from which a shingled steeple sharply rises. The older "Union Chapel" structure was sold to the existing Episcopalian congregation of what became known as St. Stephan's Church as verified by both the land records of Dorchester County and the short history of St. Stephan's written by one of its rectors Father Robert English.

Within the same time frame land was donated to the Trustees of Trinity for the construction of a parsonage. that parcel and subsequent structure were located on the east side of the main street near its southern end remained the parsonage until the early 1960s when a new brick structure adjacent to the church replace it. The original parsonage from the 1840s is still standing as of this writing. At the time of the construction of the new parsonage a dilemma arose over the disposal of the older structure and lot as it was subject to a reversionary clause in its granting deed requiring that the gifted land always be used for the purpose of a parsonage but to revert to the original grantors, their heirs or assignees if the land ceased to be used for that purpose. A lawsuit was required to resolve the issue as no heirs of the original grantors could be found.

A third development in the same time period occurred when land for a new cemetery was conveyed to the Trustees of Trinity Methodist Church. The new location was just outside the official town boundaries to the southwest on the main road of what is now known as Maryland Rt. 16. This parcel was part of a farm and was conveyed to the trustees by Thomas K. Smith. Thus the continued use of the older burial ground of their former location at "Union Chapel" was no longer needed; it coincides with a more general trend known the rise of the cemetery movement (for a general discussion of the topic of the cemetery movement see the book Lincoln at Gettysburg by historian Garry Wills)

The Greek revival structure was, by oral tradition, greatly altered on the interior when a major wing was added ca. 1912. Supposedly a balcony was removed, new stained glass windows and a wing known as the "Sunday School" wing was added, and coal oil lamps replaced. A pressed tin ceiling and wall covering above beaded tongue and groove wainscoting installed, and a split chancel rail floor plan adopted and choir box added. The original exterior design remained fundamentally unaltered and the new wing continued the Greek revival look of the original. A series of vastly oversized folding panel doors separated the wing from the main sanctuary. However, over time, due to the lack of a solid foundation footing, the great weight of the doors and the settling of the area where the original sanctuary and south wall of the wing met, the doors ceased to be able to open or retract and resulted in their being removed, leaving a large squared arch opening between the sanctuary and the wing.

In addition to the Methodist denomination, an Anglican Chapel was known to have been built in 1791 under the auspices of James Sulivane. The original chapel and graveyard established by the Methodist congregation continued to be used by the local Episcopal congregation as its second location until the building of its third and current church, St. Stephen's Church, in 1893 on the northern end of the town's main street. The 'Methodist Protestant Church', 'Baptist Church', 'German Evangelical and Reformed Church', and 'Lutheran Church', have also served in the community.

Various types of schools and academies serve the community and a far wider reach than might be imagined for a town whose core population remained relatively stable for close to two centuries. The earliest school was chartered by the state in 1818, and others, public and private, male and female, white and black followed. The two main schools came about in 1878-80 and in 1912.

On February 6, 1819, the New-Market Academy was incorporated. Five days later, the law providing for the free public school system in Dorchester County was passed and naming the commissioners for the same. In 1829, the state legislature provided for an annual payment of $200 to the academy, and the academy was reincorporated in 1830. An additional statute made it clear that the annual allocation for the New Market Academy was not to be considered as part of the funding for the free school system. These respective acts were passed under the governorships of Charles Goldsborough, native to Dorchester County, and Thomas King Carroll, who had strong family ties with the county. In 1850, the Newmarket Academy and the county free schools were joined by the East New Market Female Seminary.

In a series of articles published in the weekly newspaper Democrat and News (D. & N.), the basic origins of the third school built in East New Market can be followed. The articles are in effect the minutes of the Dorchester County School Board that were published subsequent to the board's meetings and appear to be reprinted in whole without comment or editing by the newspaper itself.

=== 20th century ===
At the February 14, 1912, meeting of the board (as reported in the minutes published on the 16th in the “D. & N.”), two residents of the town identified in the minutes only as Messers Demott and Clifton appeared complaining of sanitary conditions. They urged the construction of a new school for the “accommodation and comfort” of the community.

It appears that at the time the board appointed from the respective communities members of the local citizenry to positions that oversaw the schools within the community in the event there were needs or problems. These appointees were referred to as trustees and reported to the members of the board. It is not entirely clear whether Messers and Demott and Clifton were in fact the referenced trustees. As the Secretary to the board was instructed to interview the trustees and report back, it seems reasonable to infer that they were not. At the same meeting, it is made clear that should a new school be in fact needed that a bond would have to be authorized by the state legislature as the board itself had no independent funds for such an undertaking.

By the April 23, 1912, meeting, the state legislature had in fact passed the authorization for a $10,000 bond but the Board had not issued them. “A delegation composed of Messers William E. Johnson, Frederick Wright, Charles Meyers, Samuel J. T. Smith, and Otis Bramble from East New Market was present and requested the Board take action...” which they the proceed to do per the May 3 issue of the “D. & N.” in that very session. The May 21 was set for the deadline for bids.

Six bids were received and opened by the building committee as reported in the June 14 issue in the “D. & N.” with bids ranging from a high bid of $12,990.oo from Daniel Harding, Baltimore to a low of $9,996.oo from A. O. German, of Hurlock. The building committee did not award the contracts deciding instead to consult with the project architect one Mr. Charles G. Fisher of Milford, Delaware.

Two items appear in the D.& N.’s July 19 report of the July 16 meeting. First, the final award of the contract was announced apparently after some negotiating to A. O. German, the successful bid being some $526.00 less than the original bid reported in the June 14 issue. Second, the school board approved the payment to S. J. T. Smith [Samuel J. T. Smith]' of $150.00 for having Mr. LeRoy Lankford move the old East New Market School. Payment of $150.oo to W. E. Johnson, president of the building committee, to the order of the project architect was also ordered. The late O.W. "Bill Hubbard" recalled in a conversation with local historian Kirk L. Hurley that he had seen a frame structure hauled on a jacked up flatbed with wheels across what was then and remains an open field to the location of what is now St. Stephen Episcopal Church. Hubbard was and remained until death a communicant of that church.

A point of confusion arises here per a conversation with the late Reuben Clauser from the 1960s. In that conversation also with Hurley, Mr. Clauser recalled being chased around the old school building in a game of tag during which he ran into the scaffolding surrounding the new brick structure. The question arises as to whether there was a delay in the moving of the school or some other explanation. It remains unanswered at this point but seems likely as the need for a school, pending completion of new construction, would remain.

The last public high school in the town ceased operation when it was merged in 1954 with the school population of two other rural high schools (Hurlock High School, and Vienna High School) to form North Dorchester High School under its first Principal, Charles F. Hurley, Sr. The elementary school was merged in the late 1970s with that of the adjoining town of Secretary in that town.

It is immediately evident from these recitations that this community was one of prosperity with a forward thinking population. Among the most progressive of these was C. Edwin Bell (Cyrus Edwin Bell) who, after the "great fire" of 1914, persuaded the town to build its own water system. Fresh potable water was and is drawn from aquifers and delivered to each home and business. A system of fire hydrants was also installed. The efforts at the last quarter of the 20th century to revamp the system saw that the pipes had been placed at a death that even modern the road reconstruction of the early 1960s and subsequent traffic had not disturbed them and that provision had been made at the initial installation of the system, off of each major line, for expansion of the system concomitant to the hoped for and expected town's growth in population when it came.

The supposition that the retention of such a major number of old buildings in whole or in part dating in some cases as far back as the latter part of the seventeenth century was due wholly or significantly to the lack of financial resources and economic prospects of the community is correct only due to many factors such as the severe and lasting effect of the economic collapse suffered by the United States in general during the Great Depression. The failure of the steam ship lines (which had by the 1920s and 1930s been acquired by the railroads) came at a time when there were insufficient resources, public or private, to maintain them). Subsequently, the decline and loss of profitability by the railroads marked a period in which the entire region of the Eastern Shore of Maryland fell into decline and obscurity. For such a small town to have achieved and maintained so much is truly remarkable. Only the county seat of Cambridge with a population vastly larger by comparison could boast so many municipal achievements so early for so long.

In 1880, four years after the nation's centennial, the town's population stood at 242 with no comparable data from the 1870 census. With East New Market and Cambridge as the only two communities set out in the census report, the picture of a rural agrarian and aqua-cultural county is complete. The report notes that the election district had a total population of 2498. This represented an increase in the districts' total population by 151. This is remarkable when noting that a significant portion of the district was lost prior to the census due to the creation of the 14th or Linkwood Election District.

Population counts for the town showed 1,267 in 1900 (all statistics per U.S. Census Bureau as reported by minor civil division per respective census.). By comparison the population of the village of Secretary was 410. There were 721 persons in the East New Market election district living outside the town limits. The village of Hurlock, which had by 1900 been made part of the new 15th election district subsequent to the 1890 census, had a population of 280. In 1910 the election district's total population was 2,068 with the town proper showing a decrease in population to 880 and Secretary's at 409. Hurlock had grown to 516. In 1920, the total for the district had reached 2008 without breaking down the totals for the town of East New Market nor the Village of Secretary. By 1930, the entire East New Market Election district had a total population of 1,800 of which 940 are noted as rural farm population. No separate town figures are shown.

=== 21st century ===
This decline in population over the past century reflects the national trends as shown the same respective census reports of declines in family sizes and the shift of the population to a more urbanized society with its concomitant economic offerings and social advantages. That in combination with the effects of a World War, the economic devastation and the resulting isolation of what had been a thriving economic community and other factors saw the decline ensue. The Town of East New Market's total was 153 at the 1990 census, and 167 at the 2000 census.

The 2005 population estimate is 245. This estimate is based on the projected relocation of retirees from the northeastern and other sections of the United States for purposes of retirement. In 2007 and 2008, a period of economic decline for the nation and region in general, construction has outstripped any total that has occurred in the combined near half century in total.

== Historic preservation ==
The town center is included in the East New Market Historic District, listed on the National Register of Historic Places.

== Notable people ==
- William Grason, former Maryland governor
- Samuel Green, African-American slave jailed in 1857 for possessing a copy of the novel Uncle Tom's Cabin by Harriet Beecher Stowe
- Thomas Holliday Hicks, former Maryland governor
- James Sulivane, Continental Army captain in the American Revolutionary War
