= Choptank River =

River in Delaware and Maryland, United States

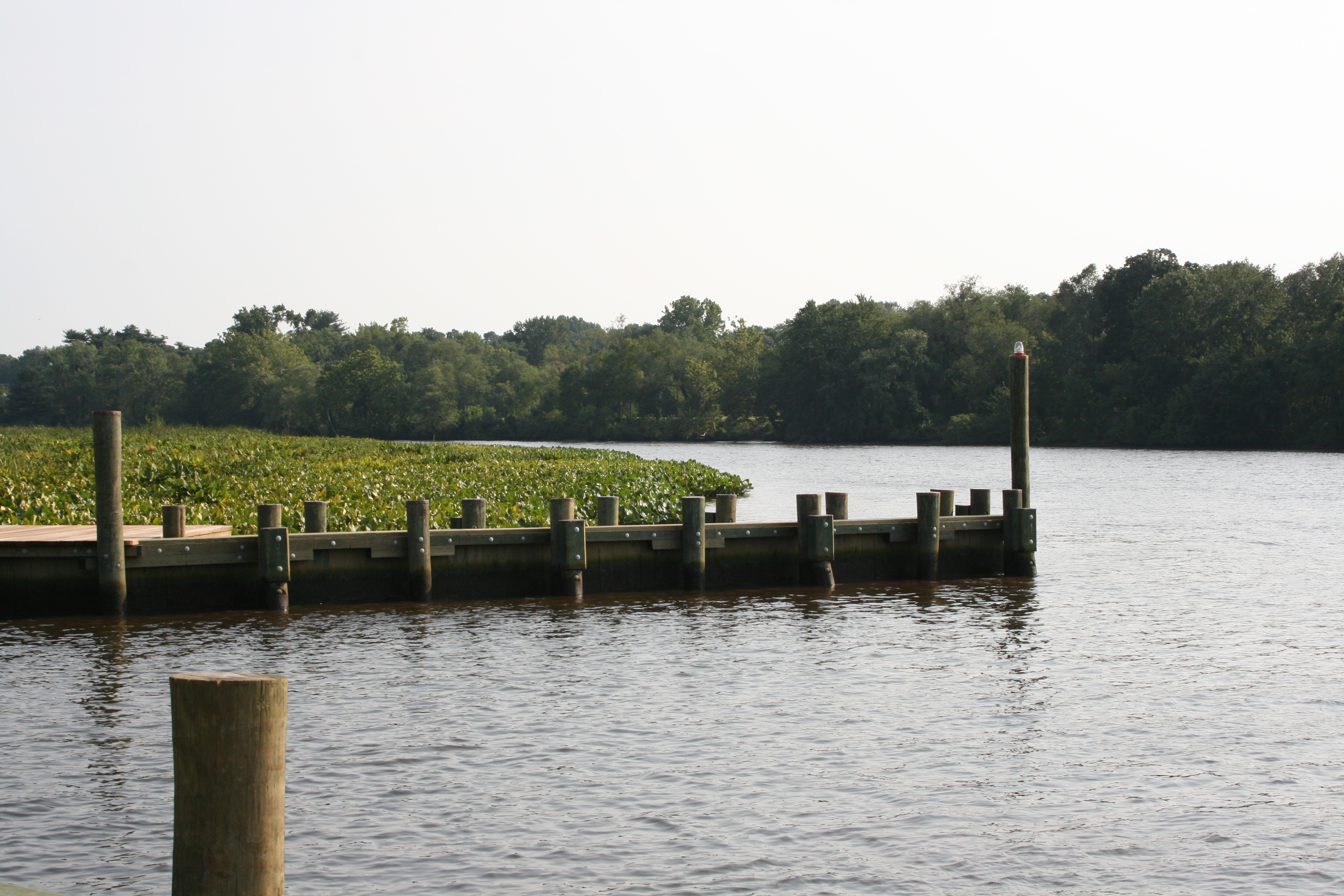
- The river in Denton, Maryland.

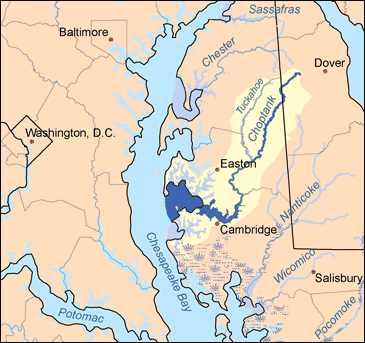
- Map of the rivers of the Eastern Shore of Maryland with the Choptank and its watershed highlighted

Location
- Country: United States
- State: Maryland, Delaware
- County: Dorchester (MD), Caroline (MD), Kent (DE)
- Cities: Cambridge, Denton, Harmony

Physical characteristics
- Source: Confluence of Tidy Island Creek and Culbreth Marsh Ditch
  - location: Choptank Mills, Delaware
  - coordinates: 39°04′3.41″N 075°44′10.75″W
  - elevation: 28 ft (8.5 m)
- Mouth: Chesapeake Bay
  - location: about 1 mile south of Tilghman Island, Maryland
  - coordinates: 38°38′4.46″N 075°19′35.81″W
  - elevation: 0 ft (0 m)
- Length: 65.38 mi (105.22 km)
- Basin size: 710.74 square miles (1,840.8 km^{2})
- Discharge
  - location: Chesapeake Bay
  - average: 809.67 cu ft/s (22.927 m^{3}/s) at mouth with the Chesapeake Bay

Basin features
- Progression: Chesapeake Bay → Atlantic Ocean
- River system: Choptank River
- Tributaries
  - left: Culbreth Marsh Ditch, Cow Marsh Creek, Sandman Branch, Gravelly Branch, Little Gravelly Branch, Tubmill Branch, Spring Branch, Chapel Branch, Watts Creek, Mill Creek, Robins Creek, Fowling Creek, Dawson Branch, Berry Run, Bell Creek, Hog Creek, Crowberry Creek, Mitchell Run, Little Creek, Skeleton Creek, Marsh Creek, Fox Creek, Hunting Creek, Blinkhorn Creek, Cabin Creek, Warwick River, Wrights Creek, White Hall Creek, Jenkins Creek, Phillips Creek
  - right: Tidy Island Creek, Broadway Creek, Forge Branch,Tuckahoe Creek, Turkey Creek, Kings Creek, Williams Creek, Barker Creek, Miles Creek, Raccoon Creek, Bolingbroke Creek, Muddy Creek, Porpoise Creek, Holmes Creek, Crosiadore Creek, La Trappe Creek, Island Creek, Tred Avon River, Broad Creek, Harris Creek
- Waterbodies: Mud Millpond
- Bridges: Still Road, Sandtown Road, MD 313, MD 314, MD 404, Meeting House Road, MD 331, US 50

The Choptank River is a major tributary of the Chesapeake Bay and the largest river on the Delmarva Peninsula. Running for 71 miles (114 km), it rises in Kent County, Delaware, runs through Caroline County, Maryland, and forms much of the border between Talbot County, Maryland, on the north, and Caroline County and Dorchester County on the east and south. It is located north of the Nanticoke River, and its mouth is located south of Eastern Bay. Cambridge, the county seat of Dorchester County, and Denton, the county seat of Caroline County, are located on its south shore.

Its watershed area in Maryland is 1,004 square miles (2,600 km^{2}), of which 224 square miles (580 km^{2}) is open water, so it is 22% water. The predominant land use is agricultural with 418 square miles (1,080 km^{2}), or 48% of the land area. The river is named after the native Choptank people.

== Course ==
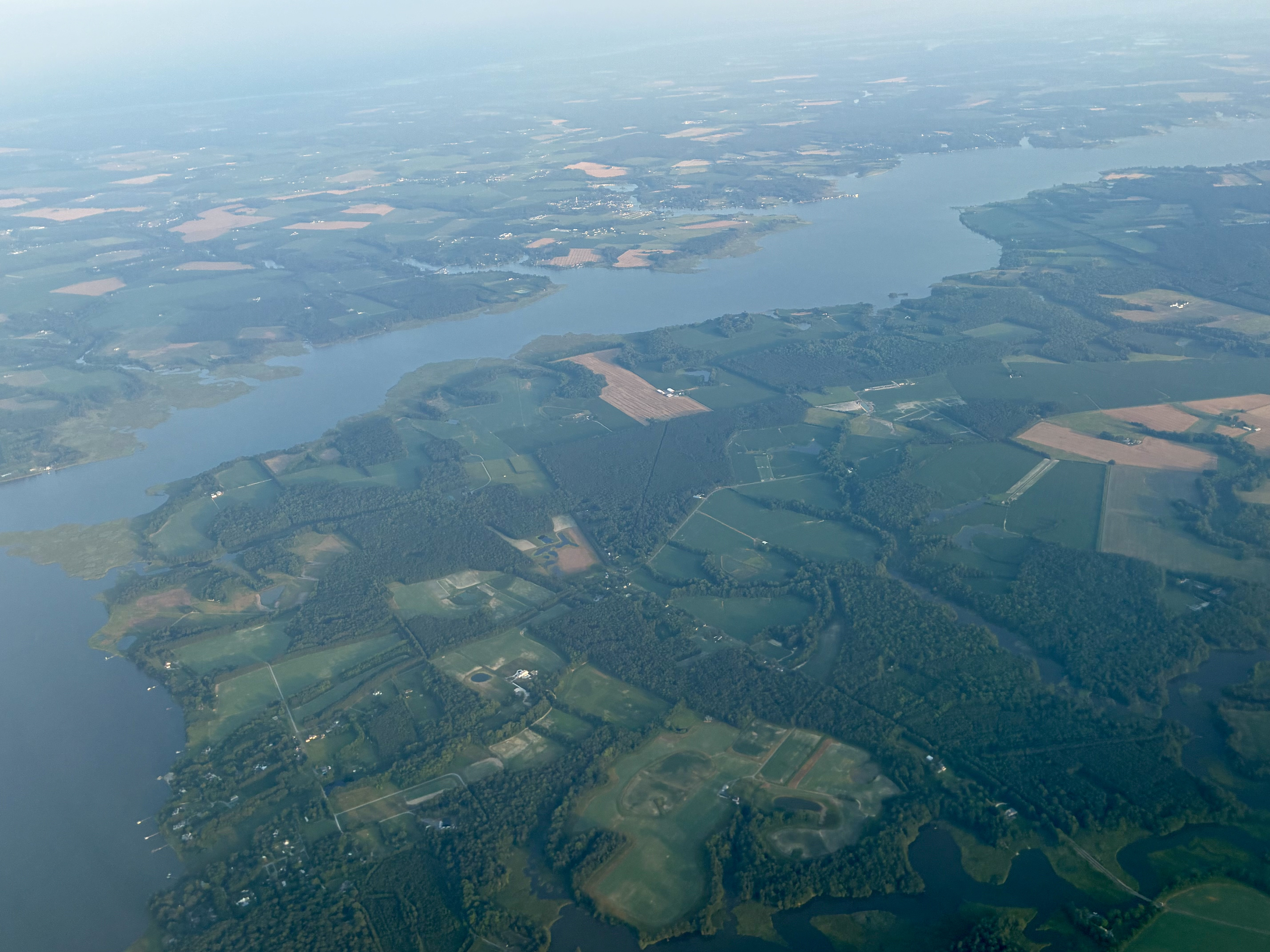
An aerial view of the Choptank River in Talbot County, Maryland.

The Choptank River begins at Choptank Mills, Delaware, where Tidy Island Creek and Culbreth Marsh Ditch join together. It ends at the Chesapeake Bay in a very wide mouth between Blackwalnut Point on Tilghman Island, and Cook Point, near Hudson, Maryland. Tidy Island Creek and Culbreth Marsh Ditch rise in western Kent County, Delaware. The entire watershed is in the coastal plain. The Choptank reaches sea level near Denton, Maryland, and is not salty until around 2 miles (3.2 km) below Denton.

== Navigability ==
The river is navigable up to Denton, about 45 miles upriver. The bridge at Cambridge limits traffic to 50 feet vertical clearance. The river’s mouth is marked in the main channel by an abandoned, tilting masonry lighthouse on the underwater Sharps’ Island. Knapp’s Narrows offers a shortcut to boats approaching from the north.

== Tributaries ==
Its main tributaries are the Tred Avon River and Tuckahoe Creek on the north side, and Cabin Creek and Hunting Creek on the south side. There are several small creeks on the northern shore, including Harris Creek, Broad Creek, Edge Creek, Irish Creek, Island Creek, La Trappe Creek, Bolingbroke Creek, Mile Creek, Kings Creek, Forge Branch and Broadway Branch. On the southern shore the small creeks include Jenkins Creek, the Warwick River, Marsh Creek, Maryland, Skeleton Creek, Mitchell Run, Hog Creek, Fowling Creek, Robins Creek, Church Creek, Williston Creek, Watts Creek, Chapel Branch, Spring Branch, Gravelly Branch and Cow Marsh Creek.

== In Fiction ==
The river is a prominent setting in James A. Michener's novel Chesapeake.

== See also ==
- List of rivers of Delaware
- List of rivers of Maryland
