= Maryland Route 544 =

Highway in Maryland

Maryland Route 544
- McGinnes Road
- Maryland Route 544 highlighted in red

Route information
- Maintained by MDSHA
- Length: 9.48 mi (15.26 km) 2 sections
- Existed: 1932–present

Major junctions
- West end: MD 213 in Kingstown
- MD 290 near Crumpton; US 301 near Millington
- East end: MD 313 near Millington

Location
- Country: United States
- State: Maryland
- Counties: Queen Anne's

Highway system
- Maryland highway system; Interstate; US; State; Scenic Byways
← MD 543	→ MD 545

Maryland Route 544 (MD 544) is a state highway in the U.S. state of Maryland. Known as McGinnes Road, the highway runs 9.48 miles (15.26 km) from MD 213 in Kingstown east to MD 313 near Millington. Through the routes at its termini, MD 544 connects the Kent County towns of Chestertown and Millington through the northern tier of Queen Anne's County. The highway was constructed in four sections: west from MD 313 and west from MD 290 near Crumpton in the early to mid-1930s, east from U.S. Route 213 (US 213, now MD 213) in the mid-1940s, and east from MD 290 in the early 1950s. MD 544 was reconstructed in the early 1960s and early 1970s. The highway was relocated at its east end during the construction of US 301. MD 544 was officially split in two when its superstreet intersection with US 301 was built in 2006.

== Route description ==
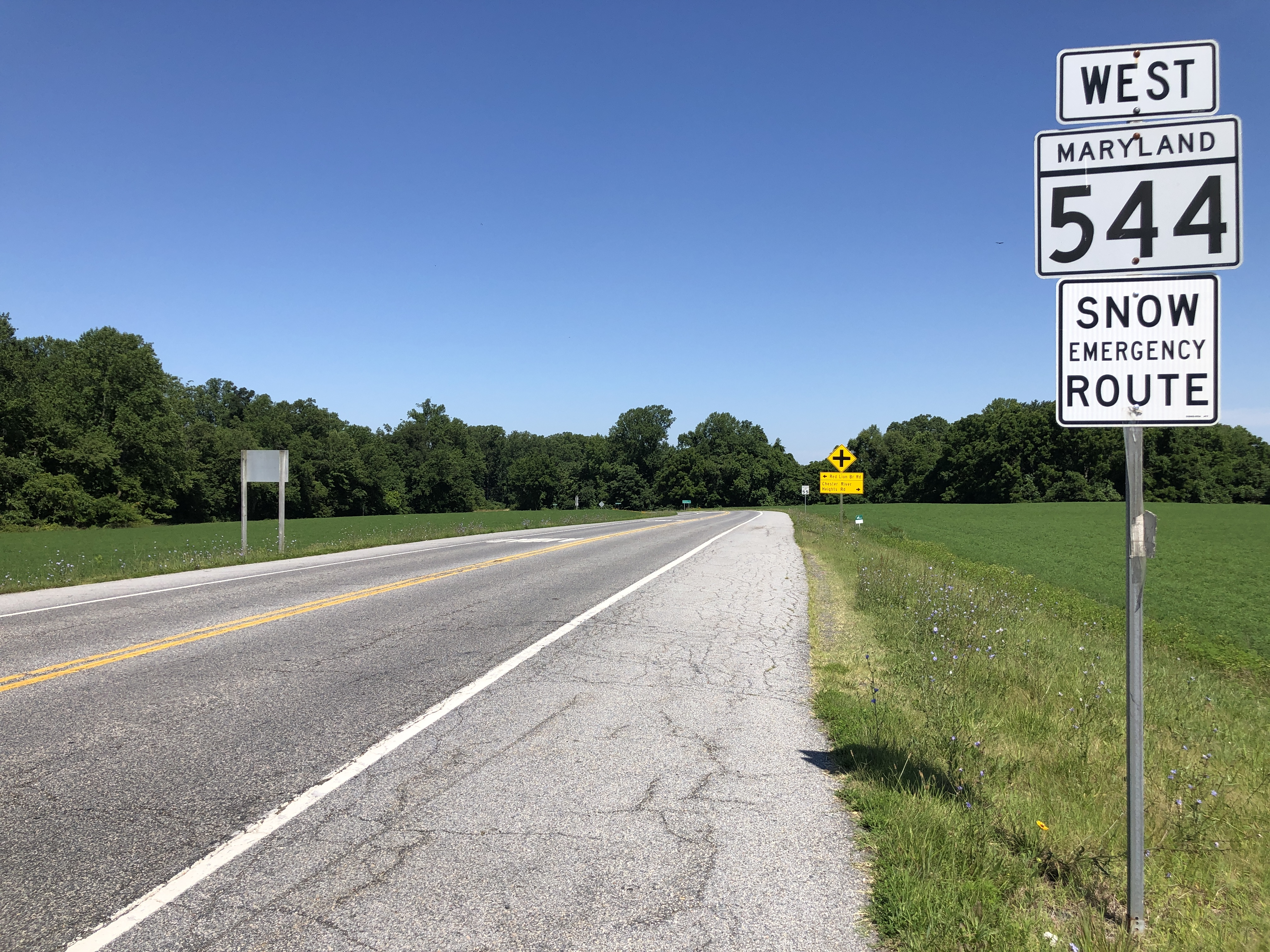
View west along MD 544 at US 301 near Millington

MD 544 begins at an intersection with MD 213 (Church Hill Road) in Kingstown. The highway heads east-northeast as a two-lane undivided road in a nearly straight course for its entire length except for its endpoints. MD 544 crosses Resin Creek and Foreman Branch of the Chester River and passes through the hamlet of McGinnes. The highway crosses Pearl Creek and Red Lion Branch on either side of its intersection with MD 290 (Dudley Corner Road) south of Crumpton. As MD 544 approaches US 301 (Blue Star Memorial Highway), the highway curves southeast while Chester River Heights Road continues straight. Mainline MD 544 officially ends at the highway's superstreet intersection with US 301. MD 544A is the official designation for the 0.19-mile-long (0.31 km) connection between the northbound lanes of US 301 and MD 313 (Millington Road) southwest of the town of Millington. Traffic on both directions of MD 544 is required to turn right onto US 301, make a U-turn, and turn right again to continue on MD 544.

== History ==
Queen Anne's County made the first improvements along what is now MD 544 by 1915, when the county constructed with state aid an L-shaped 16-foot-wide (4.9 m) shell macadam road along part of what is now MD 290 north to Crumpton and on the Fingerboard Road from modern MD 290 east to Perry Lynch Road. The first Maryland State Roads Commission–directed improvement was construction of a concrete road on the Unicorn Mills Road from MD 313 at the hamlet of Unicorn straight west to Lindsay Road in 1932. By 1933, the county-maintained shell macadam road on the Fingerboard Road near Crumpton had been extended east to Lindsay Road. The state started work from MD 290 west part of the way toward McGinnes Corner in 1934, and the macadam road was completed to west of Pearl Creek in 1935. The macadam road was extended west to McGinnes Corner by 1938.

In 1946, Queen Anne's County requested funds for the 3-year post-war construction program to be applied to the two county-maintained portions of the Chestertown–Millington highway and for those stretches to be added to the state highway system. The first section, the portion of MD 544 from US 213 east to McGinnes Corner, was constructed as a 20-foot-wide (6.1 m) bituminous stabilized gravel road in 1946. The second section was the 18-foot-wide (5.5 m) shell macadam Fingerboard Road. In 1951, Queen Anne's County requested the state improve the road and assume maintenance due to damage from heavy truck traffic from a contractor that used the road to work on road projects elsewhere in the county. That stretch of highway was improved and brought into the state system later that year, thus completing MD 544 from US 213 to MD 313.

MD 544 was relocated to its present course at its eastern end when the Blue Star Memorial Highway (originally MD 71 and now US 301) was built west of Millington between 1954 and 1957. The bypassed portions of the highway are now part of Chester River Heights Road west of US 301 and Legion Road (once designated MD 544A) east of US 301. MD 544 was reconstructed and surfaced with bituminous concrete from US 213 to McGinnes Corner in two sections between 1962 and 1964. The highway from McGinnes Corner to MD 290 was reconstructed in 1970 and 1971, and the remainder of the highway from MD 290 to US 301 was rebuilt in 1971 and 1972. The MD 544–US 301 intersection was transformed into a superstreet intersection in 2006, resulting in the designation of MD 544A east of the junction.

== Junction list ==
The entire route is in Queen Anne's County.

Location	mi	km	Destinations	Notes
Kingstown	0.00	0.00	MD 213 (Church Hill Road) – Church Hill, Chestertown	Western terminus of MD 544
Crumpton	6.99	11.25	MD 290 (Dudley Corner Road) – Galena, Sudlersville	
	9.29	14.95	US 301 (Blue Star Memorial Highway) – Wilmington, Bay Bridge	Superstreet intersection; eastern terminus of MD 544; western terminus of MD 544A
	9.48	15.26	MD 313 (Millington Road) – Millington, Sudlersville	Eastern terminus of MD 544A
1.000 mi = 1.609 km; 1.000 km = 0.621 mi

== Auxiliary routes ==
MD 544A is the current designation for the 0.19-mile-long (0.31 km) portion of the highway east of the highway's superstreet intersection with US 301. MD 544A was previously assigned to part of MD 544 bypassed when the highway was relocated when Blue Star Memorial Highway was constructed through the area between 1954 and 1957. MD 544A was assigned to what is now Legion Road from MD 313 west to a barricade at US 301 in 1959. The highway had a mainline length of 0.50 miles (0.80 km) and a 0.03-mile-long (0.048 km) spur at the MD 313 end. The Maryland State Roads Commission transferred MD 544A and the 0.23-mile-long (0.37 km) Chester River Heights Road portion of the old course of MD 544, which never received a designation, to county maintenance through a February 19, 1962, memorandum of action.
