= Maryland Route 290 =

Highway in Maryland

Maryland Route 290
- Maryland Route 290 highlighted in red

Route information
- Maintained by MDSHA
- Length: 17.20 mi (27.68 km)
- Existed: 1927–present

Major junctions
- South end: MD 300 at Dudley Corners
- US 301 near Dudley Corners; MD 544 near Crumpton; MD 291 near Chesterville; MD 444 in Chesterville; MD 313 near Galena; MD 213 in Galena; US 301 near Sassafras
- North end: MD 299 near Sassafras

Location
- Country: United States
- State: Maryland
- Counties: Queen Anne's, Kent

Highway system
- Maryland highway system; Interstate; US; State; Scenic Byways
← MD 289	→ MD 291

Maryland Route 290 (MD 290) is a state highway in the U.S. state of Maryland. The highway runs 17.20 miles (27.68 km) from MD 300 at Dudley Corners north to MD 299 near Sassafras. MD 290 roughly parallels U.S. Route 301 (US 301), which it intersects twice, as it connects the communities of Crumpton in northern Queen Anne's County and Chesterville and Galena in eastern Kent County. The portion of the route in Queen Anne's County was constructed as MD 301 in the early to mid-1920s. In Kent County, a portion south of Galena was built in the late 1910s and extended south to the Chester River in the late 1920s. MD 290 assumed the course of MD 301 in 1940 to avoid a number conflict with US 301. The Galena–Sassafras section of the highway was built in the late 1940s. MD 290 was reconstructed in Queen Anne's County and from south of Galena to Sassafras in the mid- to late 1950s. The highway's interchanges with US 301 were built when the U.S. Highway's course was constructed in the mid-1950s.

== Route description ==
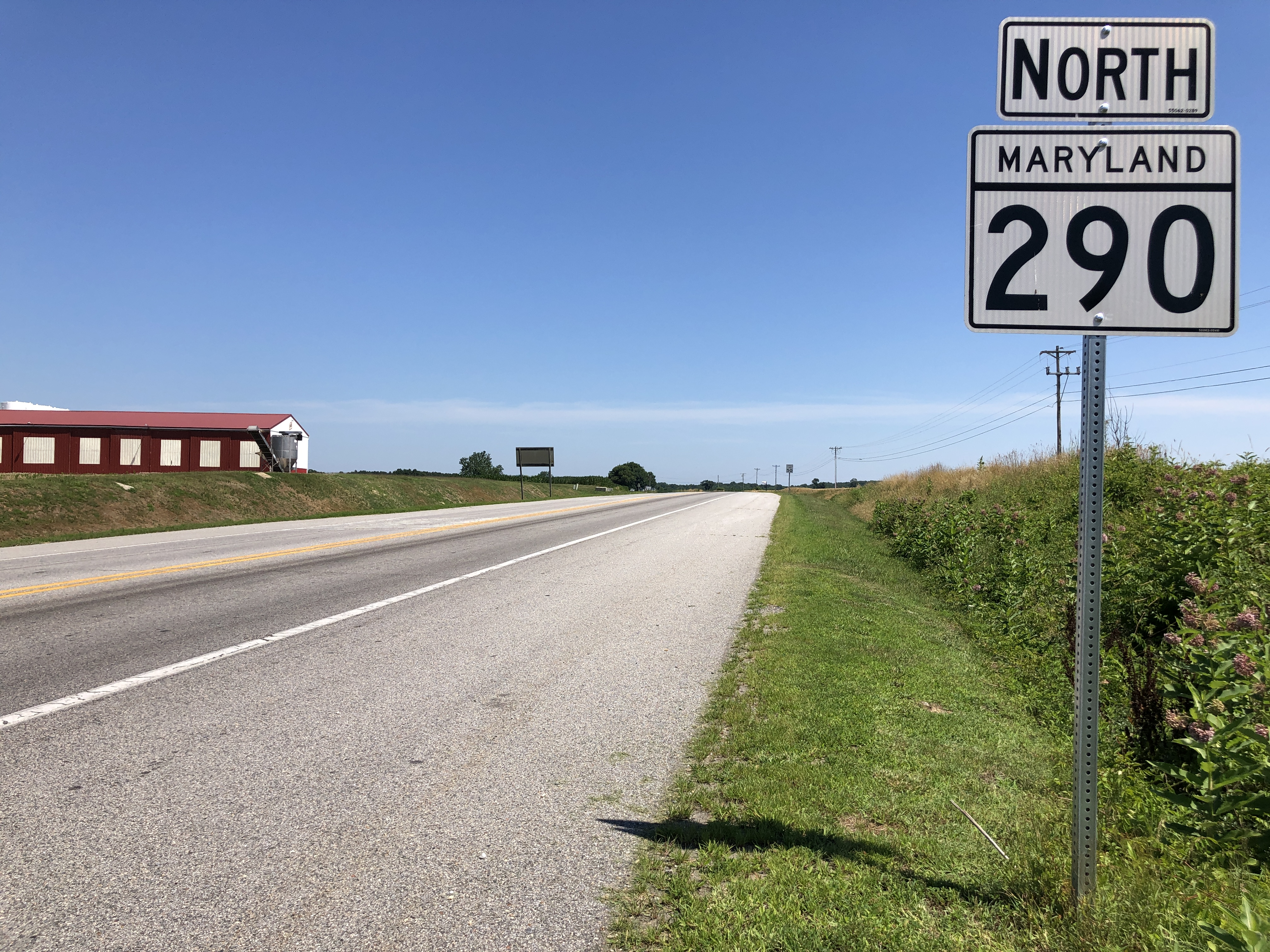
View north along MD 290 at MD 300 at Dudley Corners

MD 290 begins at an intersection with MD 300 (Sudlersville Road) in the hamlet of Dudley Corners west of Sudlersville. The south leg of the intersection is county-maintained Benton Corners Road, which leads to Dudley's Chapel. MD 290 heads north as two-lane undivided Dudley Corner Road, which crosses Red Lion Branch just south of its tight partial cloverleaf interchange with US 301 (Blue Star Memorial Highway). The highway passes through the hamlet of Pondtown south of its intersection with MD 544 (McGinnes Road). MD 290 passes along the east side of the unincorporated village of Crumpton and crosses over the Chester River from Queen Anne's County into Kent County, where the route's name becomes Crumpton Road. The highway turns east and runs concurrently with MD 291 (River Road) briefly before turning north toward Chesterville, where the route meets the south end of MD 444 (Locust Grove Road) next to the historic Chesterville Brick House.

MD 290 continues north from Chesterville along Chesterville Road, which has a grade crossing of the Northern Line of the Maryland and Delaware Railroad at the hamlet of Lambson. At Irelands Corner, the highway intersects Irelands Corner Road and MD 313 (Galena Road). MD 290 and MD 313 head north concurrently and enter the town of Galena along Main Street. MD 313 has its northern terminus in the center of town where north–south Main Street intersects east–west Cross Street. MD 213 follows Cross Street west toward Chestertown and Main Street north toward Cecilton; MD 290 continues east on Cross Street, which becomes Galena Sassafras Road at the town limit. The highway crosses Mill Creek then curves northeast and bridges Swantown Creek and Jacobs Creek. East of the latter creek, MD 290 meets US 301 (Blue Star Memorial Highway) at a diamond interchange with ramps staggered into four intersections. The highway intersects the northern end of the Massey Spur Road, which is unsigned MD 299A, before its tangent intersection with MD 299, which heads south on Massey Road and northeast on Galena Sassafras Road through Sassafras.

== History ==
Maryland Route 301
- Location: Dudley Corners–Crumpton
- Existed: 1927–1940

MD 290 was constructed in three main sections: from Dudley Corners to Crumpton, from the Chester River to Galena, and from Galena to Sassafras. The first two sections were constructed as separate routes before World War II and were designated MD 301 and MD 290, respectively. The Maryland State Roads Commission included the highway between Dudley Corners and Crumpton as one of its original state roads proposed for improvement in 1909. However, by 1915 the commission had deemed the route not to be an essential part of the state road system. Queen Anne's County constructed with state aid a 0.5-mile-long (0.80 km) gravel road from McGinnes Road (now MD 544) to Crumpton (along with a section of McGinnes Road) by 1921. The state constructed a concrete road from Dudley Corners to McGinnes Road in 1924 and 1925. The portion of MD 301 from McGinnes Road to Crumpton was paved with concrete by 1930.

Kent County constructed with state aid a 14-foot-wide (4.3 m) concrete road from Galena south to Lambson station on the Chestertown Branch of the Philadelphia, Baltimore and Washington Railroad (now the Maryland and Delaware Railroad) between 1915 and 1919. The remainder of MD 290 from Lambson south to the Chester River, including the east–west segment on River Road, was constructed as a concrete road in 1929 and 1930. This work was funded by a $900,000 bond issue of Kent County used to build 50 miles (80 km) of 9-to-16-foot (2.7 to 4.9 m) concrete roads in those years. MD 290 was extended south over MD 301's course to Dudley Corners in 1940 to remove a number conflict with US 301, which was extended north from Virginia to Baltimore the same year.

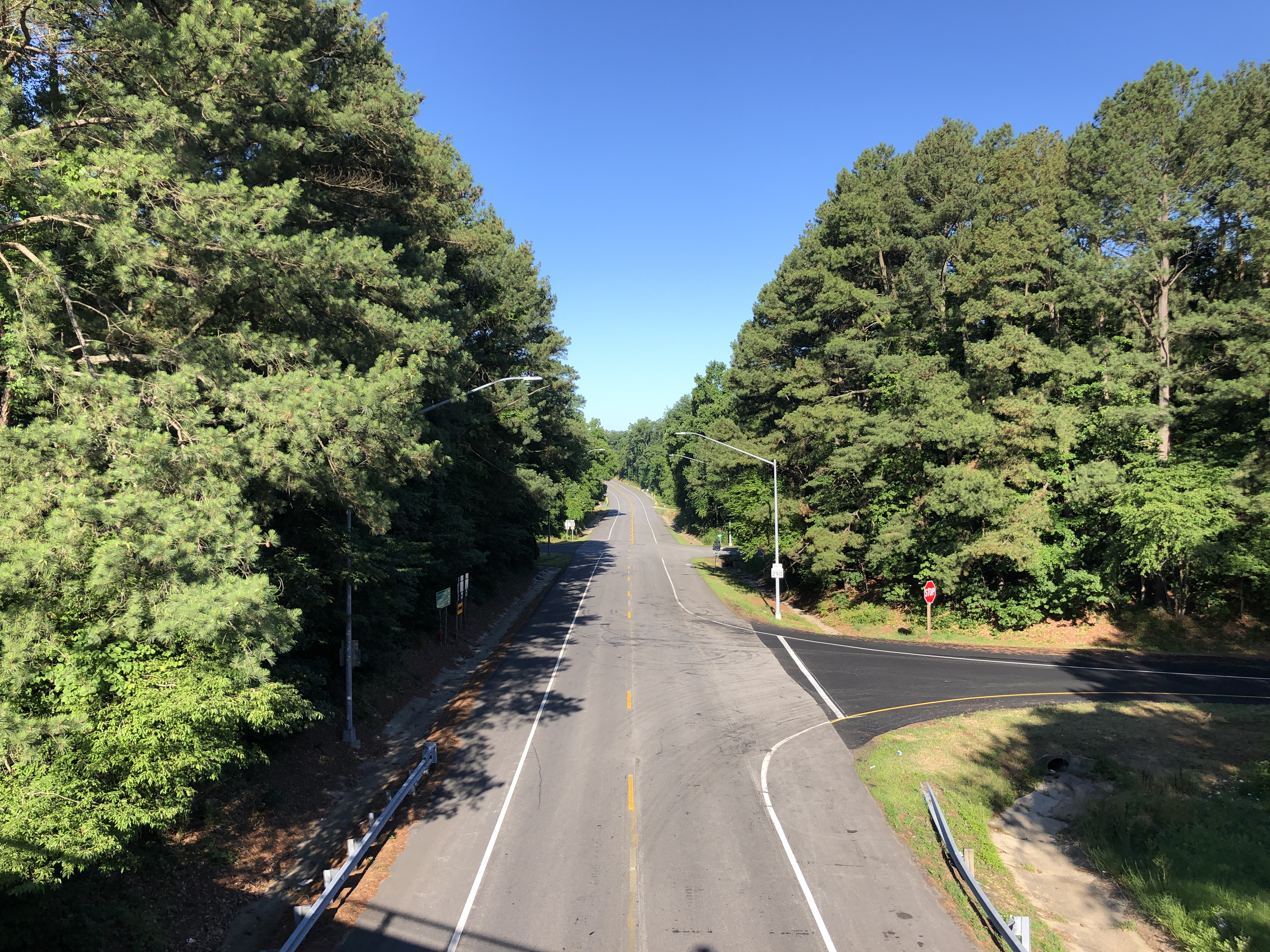
MD 290 southbound at US 301 near Sassafras

In 1945, Kent County proposed upgrading the Galena–Sassafras county road as part of a 3-year post-war federal funding program and that the work be split into three sections of increasing length over 3 years. The project was instead constructed in two steps. The first step, reconstruction of the existing highway as a gravel road, was split into two sections both started in 1947. The second step was construction of a bituminous-stabilized gravel surface, which occurred shortly after the completion of the first step in 1948. Work on the western segment included relocating the highway from what is now Olivet Hill Road. The reconstructed highway became an extension of MD 290 in 1948. The Galena–Sassafras portion of MD 290 was widened and reconstructed again between 1956 and 1958 and surfaced with bituminous concrete in 1960.

MD 290's timber bridge across the Chester River had been proposed for replacement as early as 1942, and Queen Anne's County requested funds for the 3-year post-war construction program be applied to the replacement bridge. The new steel beam and concrete bridge at Crumpton was built in 1951 and 1952. The highway from MD 300 to the new Crumpton bridge was reconstructed, widened, and surfaced with bituminous concrete in 1956 and 1957. As part of the relocation and reconstruction of MD 313 at Irelands Corner in 1956 and 1957, the portion of MD 290 between Irelands Corner Road (which became MD 801) and modern MD 313 was constructed. The portion of MD 290 between the Chester River and Irelands Corner Road—except for the MD 291 concurrency, which had been reconstructed in 1962 and 1963—was resurfaced with bituminous concrete in 1971. MD 290's two interchanges with the Blue Star Memorial Highway (originally MD 71 and now US 301) were both built in 1954 and 1955. In both cases, a single bridge was built at each interchange, as the highway was originally built as one carriageway of an ultimate divided highway. The southbound bridge was built at the Kent County interchange in 1962 and 1963 and at the Queen Anne's County junction in 1966 and 1967.

== Junction list ==
County	Location	mi	km	Destinations	Notes
Queen Anne's	Dudley Corners	0.00	0.00	MD 300 (Sudlersville Road) to US 301 / Benton Corners Road south – Dover	Southern terminus
Queen Anne's		1.21	1.95	US 301 (Blue Star Memorial Highway) – Bay Bridge, Wilmington	Interchange
Queen Anne's	Crumpton	3.69	5.94	MD 544 (McGinnes Road) – Chestertown, Millington	
		4.80	7.72	Bridge over Chester River	
Kent		5.91	9.51	MD 291 west (River Road) – Chestertown	South end of concurrency with MD 291
Kent		6.58	10.59	MD 291 east (River Road) – Millington	North end of concurrency with MD 291
Kent	Chesterville	7.56	12.17	MD 444 north (Locust Grove Road) / Chesterville Bridge Road east	Southern terminus of MD 444
Kent	Galena	12.04	19.38	MD 313 south (Galena Road) – Massey	South end of concurrency with MD 313
Kent	Galena	12.76	20.54	MD 213 (Cross Street/Main Street) – Chestertown, Cecilton MD 313 ends	Northern terminus of MD 313; MD 290 turns east at this intersection
Kent	Sassafras	16.84	27.10	US 301 (Blue Star Memorial Highway) – Bay Bridge, Wilmington	Diamond interchange
Kent	Sassafras	17.20	27.68	MD 299 (Massey Road/Galena Sassafras Road) – Massey, Warwick	Northern terminus
1.000 mi = 1.609 km; 1.000 km = 0.621 mi: Concurrency terminus
