= Maryland Route 291 =

Highway in Maryland

Maryland Route 291
- Maryland Route 291 highlighted in red

Route information
- Maintained by MDSHA
- Length: 18.34 mi (29.52 km)
- Existed: 1930–present
- Tourist routes: Chesapeake Country Scenic Byway

Major junctions
- West end: MD 20 in Chestertown
- MD 213 in Chestertown; MD 298 near Chesterville; MD 290 near Chesterville; US 301 near Millington; MD 313 in Millington
- East end: DE 6 near Millington

Location
- Country: United States
- State: Maryland
- Counties: Kent

Highway system
- Maryland highway system; Interstate; US; State; Scenic Byways
← MD 290	→ MD 292

Maryland Route 291 (MD 291) is a state highway in the U.S. state of Maryland. The highway runs 18.34 miles (29.52 km) from MD 20 in Chestertown east to the Delaware state line east of Millington, where the highway continues east as Delaware Route 6 (DE 6). MD 291 parallels the Chester River along the southern edge of Kent County and connects Chestertown with U.S. Route 301 (US 301). The highway follows much of what was originally MD 447, which was constructed between US 213 in Chestertown and MD 290 at Chesterville around 1930. MD 291 itself was built east of Millington around 1930. The highway was extended west toward Chesterville in the early 1930s, but it was not complete to MD 290 until the late 1940s. MD 291 was extended west to US 213 along a partially new alignment in the early 1960s, superseding MD 447. MD 291 was reconstructed along its entire length between the mid-1960s and mid-1970s, and it reached its present western terminus at MD 20 in 1969.

== Route description ==
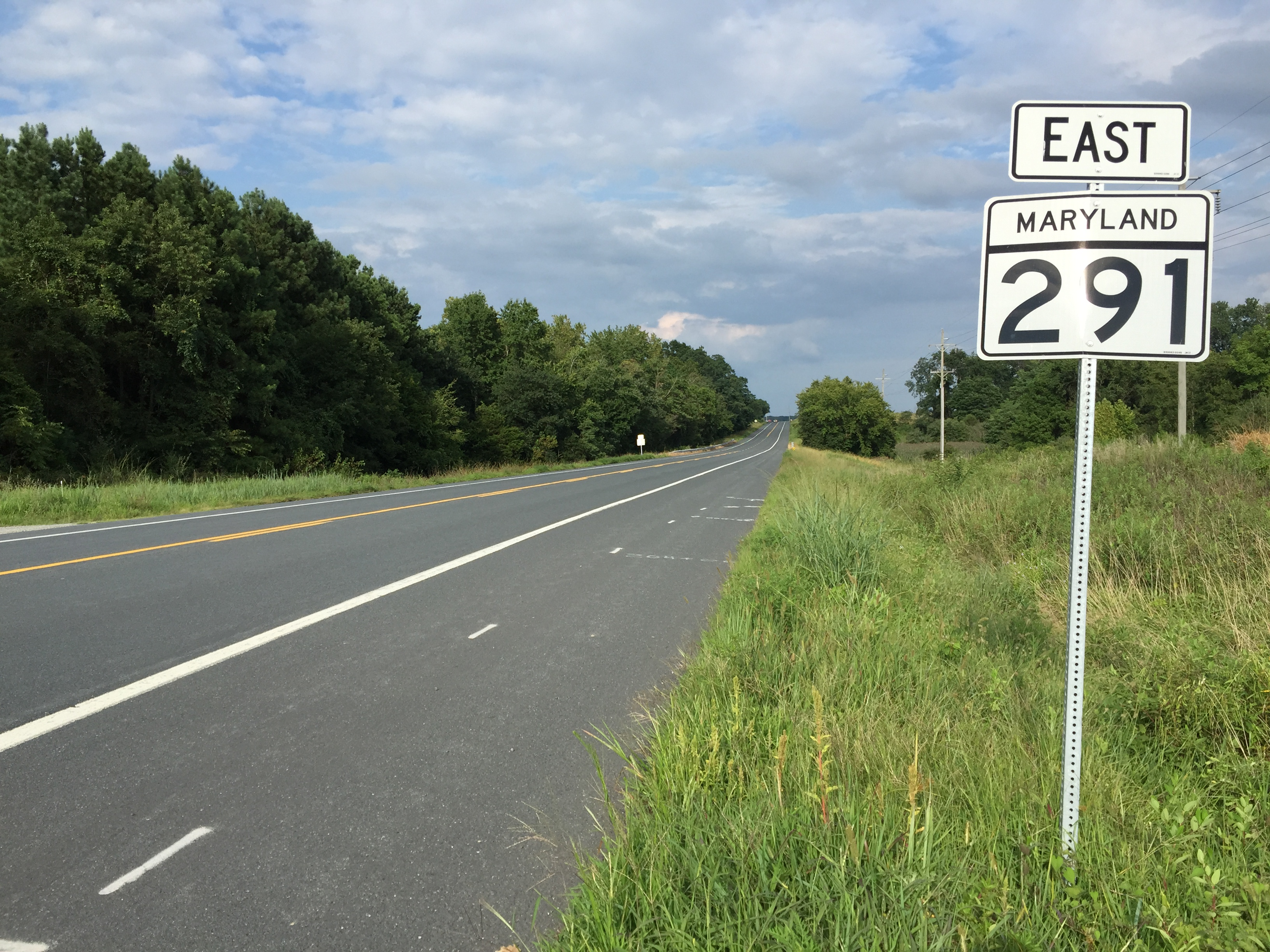
View east along MD 291 at MD 298 near Chesterville

MD 291 begins in the town of Chestertown at a roundabout with MD 20 (Chestertown Road) near the eastern terminus of the latter highway, which continues south as High Street toward downtown Chestertown. MD 291 heads east as two-lane undivided Morgnec Road, which meets the northern terminus of the Gilchrest Rail Trail and passes along the northern edge of Washington College. The highway intersects MD 213 (Washington Avenue) at Lees Corner and leaves the town limits shortly before passing the Maryland State Highway Administration District 2 offices. MD 291 crosses Morgan Creek on a steel truss bridge on its way to Morgnec, where the highway's name changes to River Road at its intersection with Morgnec Road, which heads north and then east further from the Chester River than MD 291. The state highway crosses Goosehaven Creek and Norris Creek and meets the eastern end of MD 298 (Cherry Lane).

MD 291 crosses Chesterville Branch between MD 298 and MD 290 (Crumpton Road). MD 291 and MD 290 run concurrently east to a different section of Crumpton Road, on which MD 290 splits north toward Chesterville. MD 291 crosses Mills Branch as it approaches its indirect interchange with US 301 (Blue Star Memorial Highway). The state highway connects with the southbound and northbound directions of the U.S. Highway via Edge Road (unsigned MD 701A) and Howard Johnson Road (unsigned MD 701), respectively, both of which meet MD 291 at roundabouts. At this interchange, a park and ride lot is located on the west side of MD 701 north of MD 291. MD 291 continues east into the town of Millington, through which the highway passes as Cypress Street. In the center of town, the highway intersects MD 313 (Sassafras Street) and the Centreville Branch of the Northern Line of the Maryland and Delaware Railroad at-grade. MD 291 crosses Cypress Branch to exit Millington along Cypress Road, which the route follows between the Chester River and the Millington Wildlife Management Area to the Delaware state line. The highway continues as DE 6 (Millington Road) toward the town of Smyrna.

== History ==
Much of what is now MD 291 was constructed as two different highways. MD 291 proper ran from MD 290 near Chesterville through Millington to the Delaware state line. MD 447 connected US 213 in Chestertown and MD 290 in Chesterville, using MD 291's current corridor from Chestertown to Morgnec and a more northerly path from Morgnec to Chesterville. MD 291 was constructed as a concrete road from Millington to the Delaware state line in 1929 and 1930; the portion of River Road on which MD 290 runs concurrently with MD 291 was paved in concrete in the same time span. The concrete highway was extended west from Millington to Mills Branch in two sections, the eastern part completed in 1933 and the western segment built in 1934 and 1935. Kent County included the portion of River Road between MD 290 and Mills Branch as its top priority in the post-war construction program; that segment was surfaced and brought into the state highway system as an extension of MD 291 in 1946.

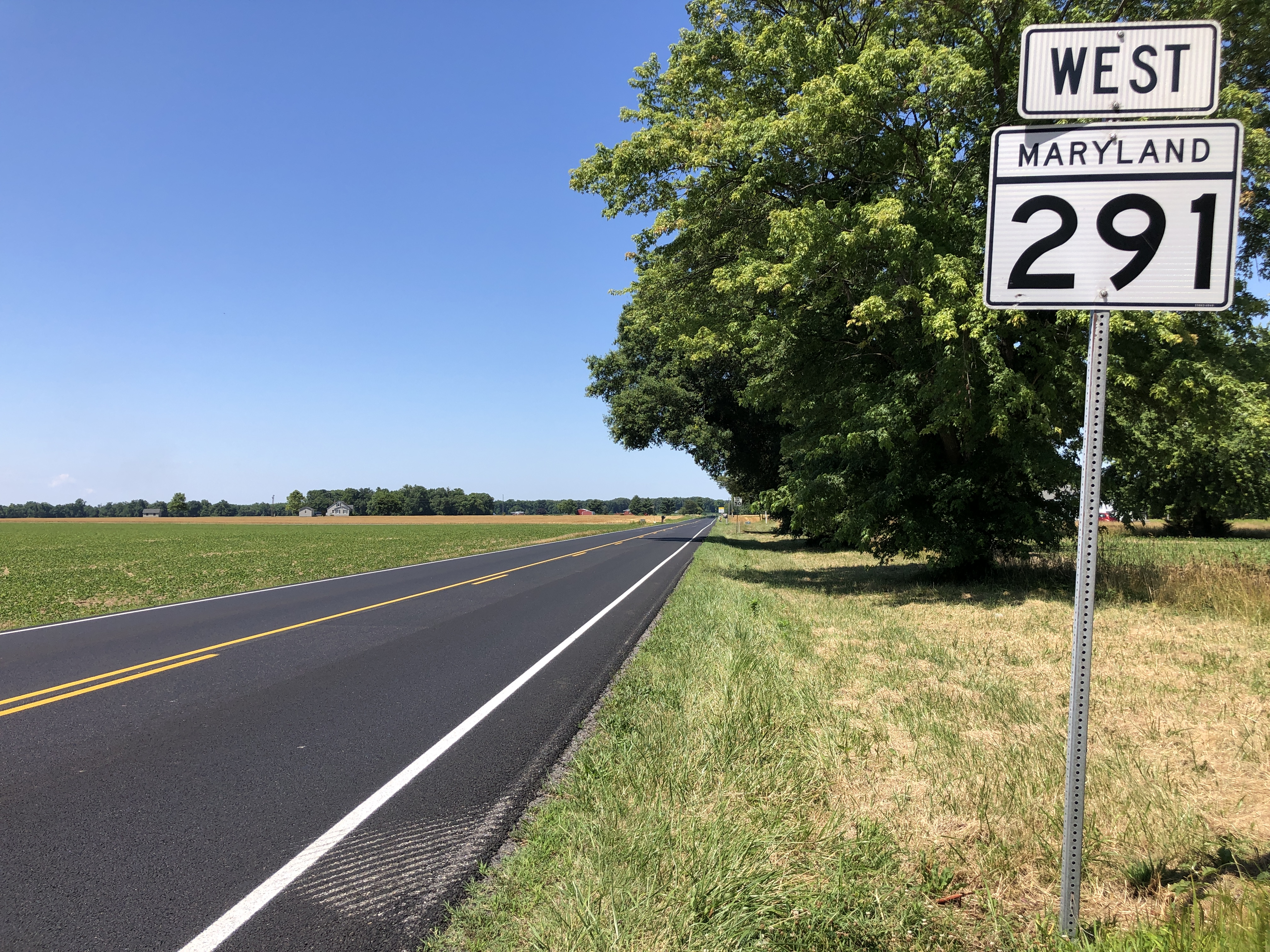
MD 291 westbound past its eastern terminus at DE 6 at the Delaware border near Millington

MD 447 was constructed from US 213 to just west of Morgnec and from Kennedyville Road to MD 290 in Chesterville in 1929 and 1930. This work was funded by a $900,000 bond issue of Kent County used to build 50 miles (80 km) of 9-to-16-foot (2.7 to 4.9 m) concrete roads in those years. MD 447 between Morgnec and Kennedyville Road was started in 1930 and paved in concrete by 1933. The highway's steel truss bridge over Morgan Creek, which replaced an old timber bridge on a more curvaceous alignment, was also completed in 1933. In a May 14, 1958, agreement, Kent County agreed to accept the Morgnec–Chesterville portion of MD 447 in exchange for the Maryland State Roads Commission reconstructing River Road from Morgnec to MD 290; the transfer would take effect on conclusion of the River Road project. The River Road project, which involved a realignment through Morgnec and reconstruction of the River Road piece of MD 290, took place in 1962 and 1963. The bypassed part of MD 447 in Morgnec became MD 859B. MD 291 was officially extended west over River Road and MD 447 to Chestertown at the end of 1962.

The remainder of MD 291 was reconstructed between the mid-1960s and mid-1970s. The highway was reconstructed from the Morgan Creek bridge to west of Morgnec in 1964; this project featured a curve-smoothing realignment on the east side of the bridge. MD 291 was reconstructed from US 213 to Morgan Creek in 1965 and 1966; the bypassed highway at the US 213 end, now Hadaway Drive, became another segment of MD 859. MD 291 was extended west from US 213 to MD 20 as new construction in 1968 and 1969; this extension had been planned as an extension of MD 447 as early as 1958. Work shifted to the original stretch of MD 291 in the late 1960s, when the highway was resurfaced with bituminous concrete from US 301 to the east side of Millington in 1967. The highway was reconstructed from MD 290 to US 301 in 1971. The reconstruction of the highway concluded with a curve being smoothed east of Millington in 1974 and the highway being resurfaced from Millington to the state line in 1975. MD 291's bridge across US 301 and its roundabouts with the two segments of MD 701 to provide access to US 301 were constructed in 1998 and 1999. The roundabout at MD 291's western terminus was built in 2014.

== Junction list ==
The entire route is in Kent County.

Location	mi	km	Destinations	Notes
Chestertown	0.00	0.00	MD 20 west (Chestertown Road) / High Street south – Rock Hall, Chestertown	Roundabout; western terminus
Chestertown	0.58	0.93	MD 213 (Washington Avenue) – Elkton, Chestertown	
Chesterville	8.05	12.96	MD 298 west (Cherry Lane) – Still Pond	Eastern terminus of MD 298
Chesterville	9.04	14.55	MD 290 south (Crumpton Road) – Crumpton	West end of concurrency with MD 290
Chesterville	9.71	15.63	MD 290 north (Crumpton Road) – Galena	East end of concurrency with MD 290
Millington	12.28	19.76	Edge Road to US 301 south (Blue Star Memorial Highway) – Bay Bridge	Roundabout; Edge Road is unsigned MD 701A
Millington	12.49	20.10	Howard Johnson Road to US 301 north (Blue Star Memorial Highway) – Wilmington	Roundabout; Howard Johnson Road is unsigned MD 701
Millington	13.91	22.39	MD 313 (Sassafras Street) – Sudlersville, Massey	
	18.34	29.52	DE 6 east (Millington Road) – Smyrna	Delaware state line; eastern terminus
1.000 mi = 1.609 km; 1.000 km = 0.621 mi: Concurrency terminus

== Auxiliary routes ==
MD 291 has two former auxiliary routes:

- MD 291A was the 0.02-mile-long (0.032 km) section of north–south highway at the tangent intersection between MD 291 and MD 859B (Morgnec Cutoff Road) on the west side of Morgnec.
- MD 291B was the 0.11-mile-long (0.18 km) section of Morgnec Cutoff Road between MD 859B (Morgnec Cutoff Road) and MD 291 at Morgnec.

Both auxiliary routes were assigned after River Road was reconstructed through Morgnec as a westward extension of MD 291 in 1962 and 1963. MD 291B and the portion of MD 859B west from MD 291B had been part of MD 447. MD 291A and MD 291B were transferred to county maintenance through a December 1, 1987, road transfer agreement.
