= Maryland Route 444 =

State highway in Maryland, United States

Maryland Route 444
- Maryland Route 444 highlighted in red

Route information
- Maintained by MDSHA
- Length: 7.29 mi (11.73 km)
- Existed: 1933–present

Major junctions
- South end: MD 290 in Chesterville
- MD 213 at Locust Grove
- North end: Belchester Road in Kentmore Park

Location
- Country: United States
- State: Maryland
- Counties: Kent

Highway system
- Maryland highway system; Interstate; US; State; Scenic Byways
← MD 440	→ MD 445

Maryland Route 444 (MD 444) is a state highway in the U.S. state of Maryland. The highway runs 7.29 miles (11.73 km) from MD 290 in Chesterville north to Belchester Road in Kentmore Park. MD 444 connects Chesterville and Kentmore Park with MD 213 at Locust Grove in northern Kent County. The highway was constructed south from Locust Grove in the early 1930s and extended north to Kentmore Park in the early 1940s. MD 444 bypassed Locust Grove in the late 1960s. The portion of the highway south of Locust Grove was removed from state control in the late 1980s but returned with an extension to Chesterville in the early 1990s.

== Route description ==
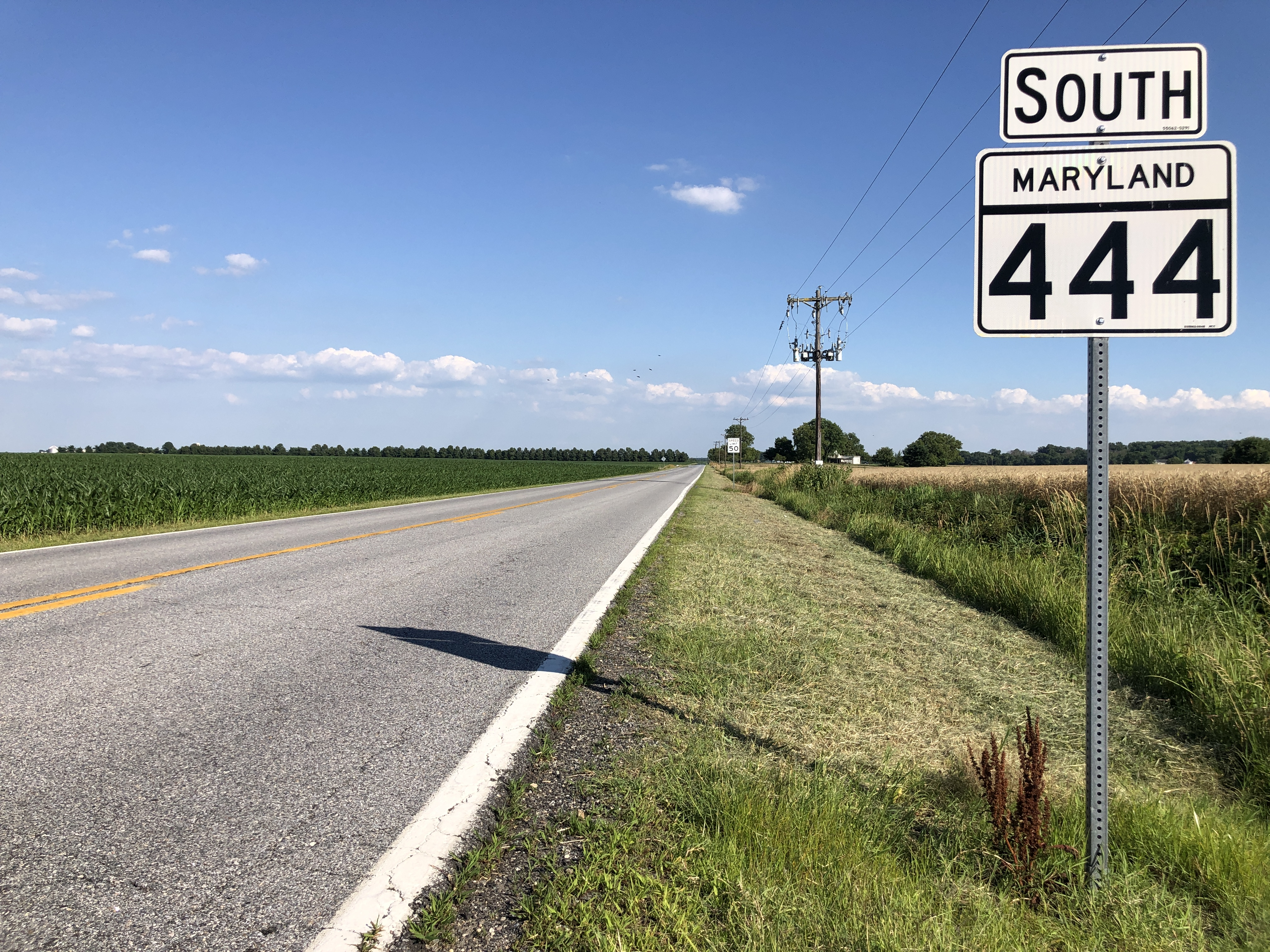
View south along MD 444 at MD 213 in Locust Grove

MD 444 begins at an intersection with MD 290 (Chesterville Road) next to the Chesterville Brick House in Chesterville. The roadway continues as county-maintained Chesterville Bridge Road on the east side of MD 290. MD 444, which is named Locust Grove Road, heads west as a two-lane undivided road to an intersection with Morgnec Road then veers north. The highway has a grade crossing of the Chestertown Branch of the Northern Line of the Maryland and Delaware Railroad before reaching MD 213 near Locust Grove. MD 444 continues north as Kentmore Park Road and immediately intersects Shallcross Wharf Road, which is unsigned MD 449 west of the intersection, and Old Locust Grove Road. MD 444 continues north to the small beach community of Kentmore Park on the Sassafras River. The state highway reaches its northern terminus north of Riverside Avenue where the road curves northeast as county-maintained Belchester Road.

== History ==
The first section of MD 444 was constructed between 1930 and 1933 as a concrete road from US 213 in Locust Grove, which is now the intersection of MD 444 and MD 449, south to the Blacks railroad crossing. That segment was one of several state highways whose construction as 9-and-16-foot-wide (2.7 and 4.9 m) concrete roads was partially funded by a $900,000 Kent County bond issue in 1929. The highway from the center of Locust Grove, at the intersection of Shallcross Wharf Road and Old Locust Grove Road, north to Kentmore Park was improved in 1939 and brought into the state highway system as a northward extension of MD 444 in 1942. Thus, the highway made two turns in Locust Grove on either side of its concurrency with US 213 along what is now Shallcross Wharf Road. The concurrent section along Shallcross Wharf Road had been planned as part of the original Chestertown–Galena highway proposed for improvement as a state road in 1909. This section was built as a 14-foot-wide (4.3 m) macadam road in 1912; the state road east from Locust Grove had been built as a 12-foot-wide (3.7 m) macadam road in 1913.

After US 213's bypass of Locust Grove was built in 1950 and 1951, the old path of US 213 through Locust Grove became part of MD 444, with the eastern section being a spur of the main route, resulting in a T-intersection with MD 444 heading three directions in the center of Locust Grove. MD 444's present course on the west side of Locust Grove was built in 1968; the highway north to Kentmore Park was resurfaced with bituminous concrete the same year. Shallcross Wharf Road on both sides of MD 444 became MD 449, and Old Locust Grove Road from its junction with the MD 444 bypass east to US 213 became MD 447. The portion of MD 444 from MD 213 south to the railroad crossing at Blacks was resurfaced with bituminous concrete in 1984. Three years later, that portion of the highway was transferred from state to county maintenance through a December 1, 1987, road transfer agreement. The Locust Grove–Blacks section returned to state control, and state maintenance was extended south to Morgnec Road and along Morgnec Road to MD 290 in Chesterville, through a June 1, 1993, road transfer agreement. State forces had improved the highway from Morgnec Road to the Blacks railroad crossing as a gravel road in 1958. The 0.30-mile-long (0.48 km) portion of Morgnec Road had been constructed as part of the original MD 447 in 1929 and 1930, another beneficiary of the 1929 Kent County bond issue.

== Junction list ==
The entire route is in Kent County.

Location	mi	km	Destinations	Notes
Chesterville	0.00	0.00	MD 290 (Chesterville Road) / Chesterville Bridge Road east – Crumpton, Galena	Southern terminus
Locust Grove	4.20	6.76	MD 213 (Augustine Herman Highway) – Chestertown, Galena	
Locust Grove	4.29	6.90	MD 449 west (Shallcross Wharf Road) / Shallcross Wharf Road east	Eastern terminus of MD 449; MD 449 is unsigned
Kentmore Park	7.29	11.73	Belchester Road north	Northern terminus
1.000 mi = 1.609 km; 1.000 km = 0.621 mi

== Auxiliary route ==
MD 444A is the designation for the unnamed 0.01-mile-long (0.016 km) ramp from southbound MD 444 to southbound MD 213 at their intersection near Locust Grove. The ramp received its designation by 1975.
