= Maryland Route 300 =

Highway in Maryland

Maryland Route 300
- Maryland Route 300 highlighted in red

Route information
- Maintained by MDSHA
- Length: 13.55 mi (21.81 km) 2 sections
- Existed: 1927–present

Major junctions
- West end: MD 213 in Church Hill
- MD 19 in Church Hill; US 301 near Dudley Corners; MD 290 at Dudley Corners; MD 313 in Sudlersville
- East end: DE 300 at the Delaware state line near Sudlersville

Location
- Country: United States
- State: Maryland
- Counties: Queen Anne's

Highway system
- Maryland highway system; Interstate; US; State; Scenic Byways
← MD 299	→ US 301

Maryland Route 300 (MD 300) is a state highway in the U.S. state of Maryland. Known for most of its length as Sudlersville Road, the highway runs 13.55 miles (21.81 km) from MD 213 in Church Hill east through Sudlersville to the Delaware state line, where the highway continues as Delaware Route 300 (DE 300). MD 300 forms part of an east–west connection between U.S. Route 301 (US 301) in northern Queen Anne's County and Dover, Delaware. MD 300 between Church Hill and Dudley Corners was one of the original state roads marked for improvement in 1909, but the county constructed the highway with state aid in the mid- to late-1910s from Church Hill to Sudlersville. The highway from Sudlersville to the state line was built in the late 1920s and early 1930s. MD 300 was widened over its entire length around 1950 and extended west to US 213's bypass of Church Hill (now MD 213) around 1970. MD 300 was officially split in two when its superstreet intersection with US 301 was built in 2005.

== Route description ==
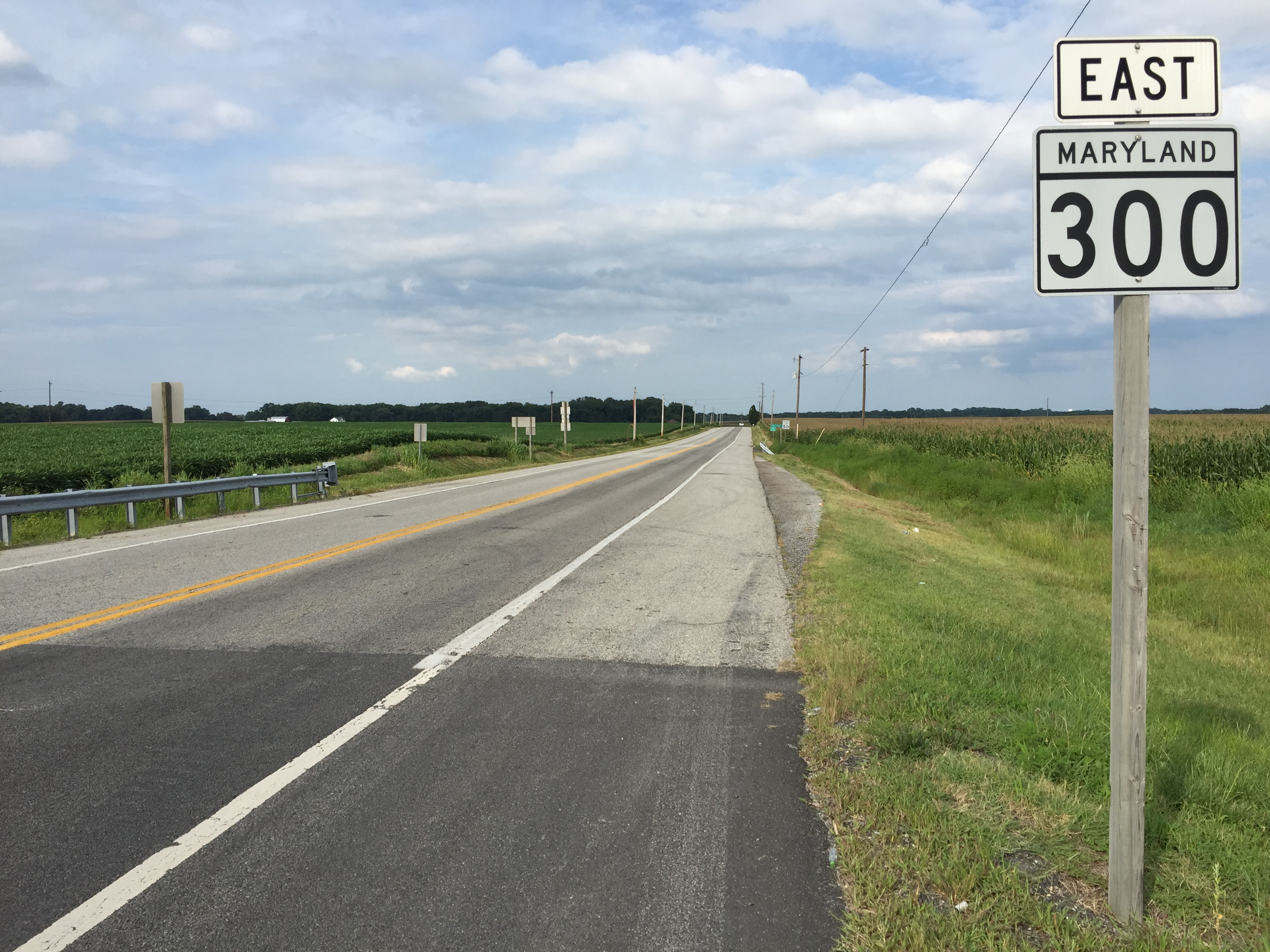
View east along MD 300 at US 301 in northern Queen Anne's County

MD 300 begins at an intersection with MD 213 (Church Hill Road) in the northern part of the town of Church Hill. The highway heads east as two-lane undivided Sudlersville Road and crosses MD 19 (Main Street) before leaving the town. The state highway heads northeast and intersects US 301 (Blue Star Memorial Highway) at a superstreet intersection next to a park and ride lot in the southwest quadrant. Traffic on MD 300 is required to turn right onto US 301, perform a U-turn, then turn right again to continue on MD 300. The highway curves east at Dudley Corners, where the route crosses Red Lion Branch and meets the southern end of MD 290 (Dudley Corner Road) and the north end of Benton Corners Road, which leads to the historic Dudley's Chapel.

MD 300 continues east to the town of Sudlersville, through which the highway follows Main Street. The highway intersects the southern terminus of MD 837 (Church Circle) and MD 313 (Church Street) before crossing the Centreville Branch of the Northern Line of the Maryland and Delaware Railroad at-grade. Upon leaving Sudlersville, the route becomes Sudlersville Road again. East of Sudlersville, MD 300 passes to the south of the historic John Embert Farm, crosses Unicorn Branch, and passes through the hamlets of Duhamel Corners and Peters Corners. MD 300 crosses Andover Branch and curves to the northeast at Busic Church Road to its eastern terminus at the Delaware state line, where Sudlersville Road continues east as DE 300 toward the town of Smyrna. A short distance east of the state line at Everetts Corner, the highway intersects the western terminus of DE 44, which connects with DE 8, which leads to the city of Dover.

MD 300 is officially separated into two sections by the US 301 superstreet intersection; MD 300 runs east of US 301 and MD 300A is the portion west of the U.S. Highway. The portion of the highway from US 301 to the Delaware state line is a part of the main National Highway System and that federal system's connection between US 301 and Dover also via DE 300, DE 44, and DE 8.

== History ==
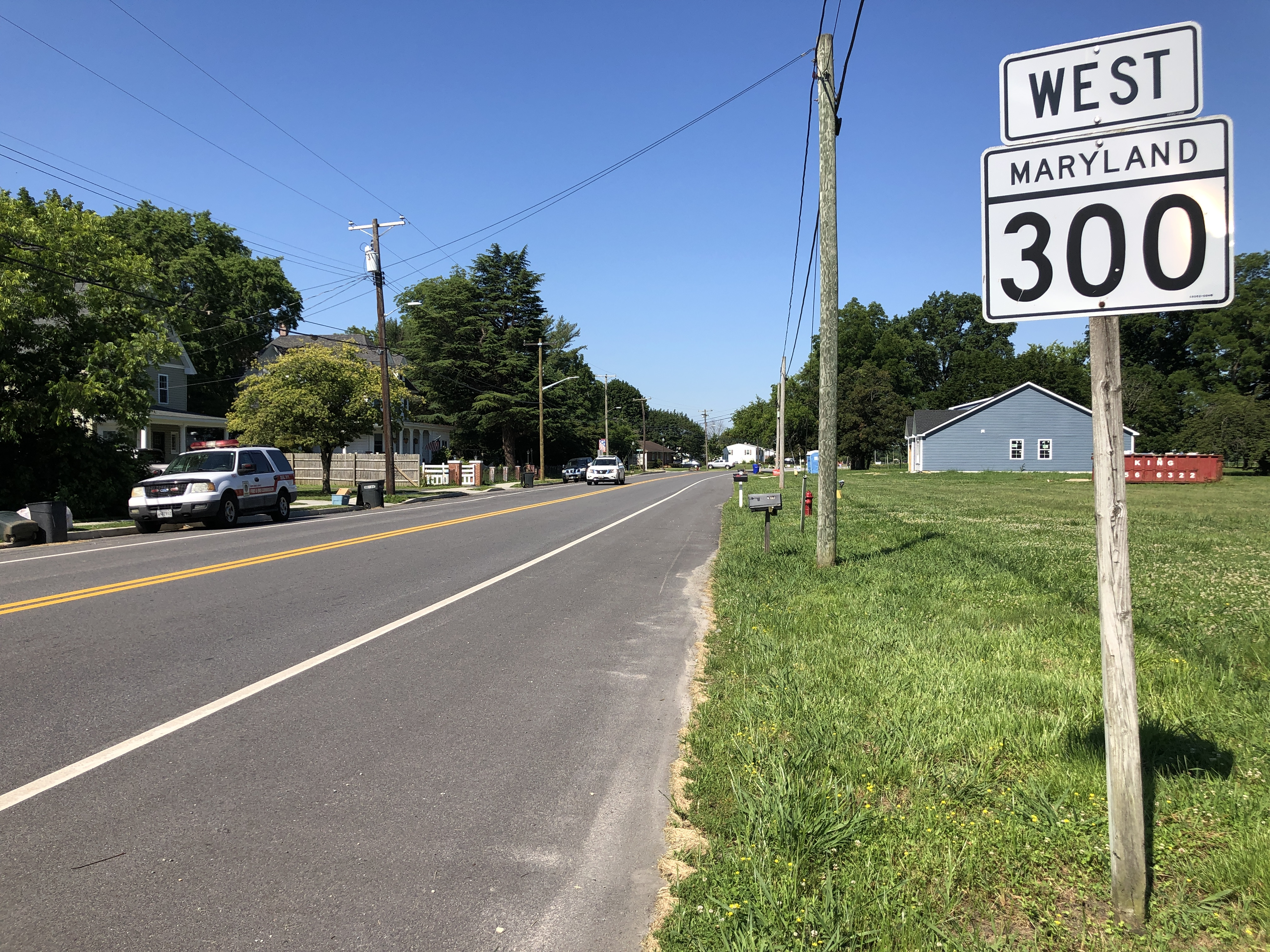
MD 300 westbound past MD 837 in Sudlersville

In 1909, the Maryland State Roads Commission designated the Church Hill–Dudley Corners road as one of the original state roads to be constructed by the commission, as part of a connection to Crumpton. However, by 1915 this route was no longer considered a necessary part of the statewide road system. Queen Anne's County constructed with state aid two segments of 9-foot-wide (2.7 m) macadam road west from Sudlersville, both of which were widened to 15 feet (4.6 m) between 1924 and 1926. The first segment, between Sudlersville and Dudley Corners, was completed by 1915. The county also constructed a state-aided concrete road from Main Street in Church Hill east to the west end of the second macadam section in 1919 and 1920. The state paved Sudlersville's Main Street in 1926.

MD 300 from Sudlersville to the Delaware state line was constructed as a concrete road in four segments. The first segment to Duhamel Corners was completed in 1928. The second segment was built in 1929, and the third segment through Peters Corners was completed in 1930. The fourth section was started in 1930 and completed to the Delaware state line by 1933. MD 300 was widened to 22 feet (6.7 m) and resurfaced with bituminous concrete in two concurrent projects, from US 213 in Church Hill through Sudlersville and from Sudlersville to the state line, in 1950 and 1951. The highway was extended west to its current terminus as part of the project to build the Church Hill bypass in 1969 and 1970. The MD 300–US 301 intersection was transformed into a superstreet intersection in 2005, resulting in the designation of MD 300A west of the junction.

== Junction list ==
The entire route is in Queen Anne's County.

Location	mi	km	Destinations	Notes
Church Hill	0.00	0.00	MD 213 (Church Hill Road) – Centreville, Chestertown	Western terminus of MD 300A
Church Hill	0.16	0.26	MD 19 (Main Street) – Church Hill	
	3.92	6.31	US 301 (Blue Star Memorial Highway) – Wilmington, Bay Bridge	Superstreet intersection; eastern terminus of MD 300A; western terminus of MD 300
Dudley Corners	5.52	8.88	MD 290 north (Dudley Corner Road) to US 301 north	Southern terminus of MD 290
Sudlersville	7.28	11.72	MD 837 north (Church Circle)	Southern terminus of MD 837
Sudlersville	7.34	11.81	MD 313 (Church Street) – Millington, Barclay	
	13.55	21.81	DE 300 east (Sudlersville Road) – Dover, Smyrna	Delaware state line; eastern terminus of MD 300
1.000 mi = 1.609 km; 1.000 km = 0.621 mi
