= List of former Maryland state highways (700–999) =

Highway names
- Interstates: Interstate X (I-X)
- US Highways: U.S. Route X (US X)
- State: Maryland Route X (MD X)
- Former state highways: 2–199; 200–399; 400–499; 500–599; 600–699; 700–999

System links
- Maryland highway system; Interstate; US; State; Scenic Byways

The Maryland highway system has several hundred former state highways. These highways were constructed, maintained, or funded by the Maryland State Roads Commission or Maryland State Highway Administration and assigned a unique or temporally unique number. Some time after the highway was assigned, the highway was transferred to county or municipal maintenance and the number designation was removed from the particular stretch of road. In some cases, a highway was renumbered in whole or in part. This list contains all or most of the state-numbered highways between 700 and 999 that have existed since highways were first numbered in 1927 but are no longer part of the state highway system or are state highways of a different number. Most former state highways have not had their numbers reused. However, many state highway numbers were used for a former highway and are currently in use. Some numbers have been used three times. The former highways below whose numbers are used presently, those that were taken over in whole or in part by another highway, or have enough information to warrant a separate article contain links to those separate highway articles. Highway numbers that have two or more former uses are differentiated below by year ranges. This list does not include former Interstate or U.S. Highways, which are linked from their respective lists.

== MD 711 (1943–1958) ==
Maryland Route 711
- Location: Elkton
- Length: 0.75 mi (1,210 m)
- Existed: 1943–1958

Maryland Route 711 was the designation for Dogwood Road, which ran 0.75 miles (1.21 km) from MD 545 east to MD 280 (now MD 213) near Elkton in northeastern Cecil County. The highway and a bridge across Dogwood Run were constructed as a wartime access project in 1942 and 1943 to provide better access to the Triumph Explosives plant along MD 545. MD 711 was transferred from state to county maintenance in a road transfer agreement on May 8, 1958.

== MD 714 ==
Maryland Route 714
- Location: Millington
- Length: 0.20 mi (320 m)
- Existed: c. 1957–1987

Maryland Route 714 was the designation for Rivers Edge Road, which ran 0.20 miles (0.32 km) from Rivers Edge West north to MD 291 west of Millington in eastern Kent County. The highway was created to re-establish access to the portion of Rivers Edge Road cut off by the construction of what is now US 301 near Millington between 1954 and 1957. MD 714 was transferred from state to county maintenance through a December 1, 1987, road transfer agreement.

== MD 752 ==
Maryland Route 752
- Location: Barstow
- Length: 0.15 mi (240 m)

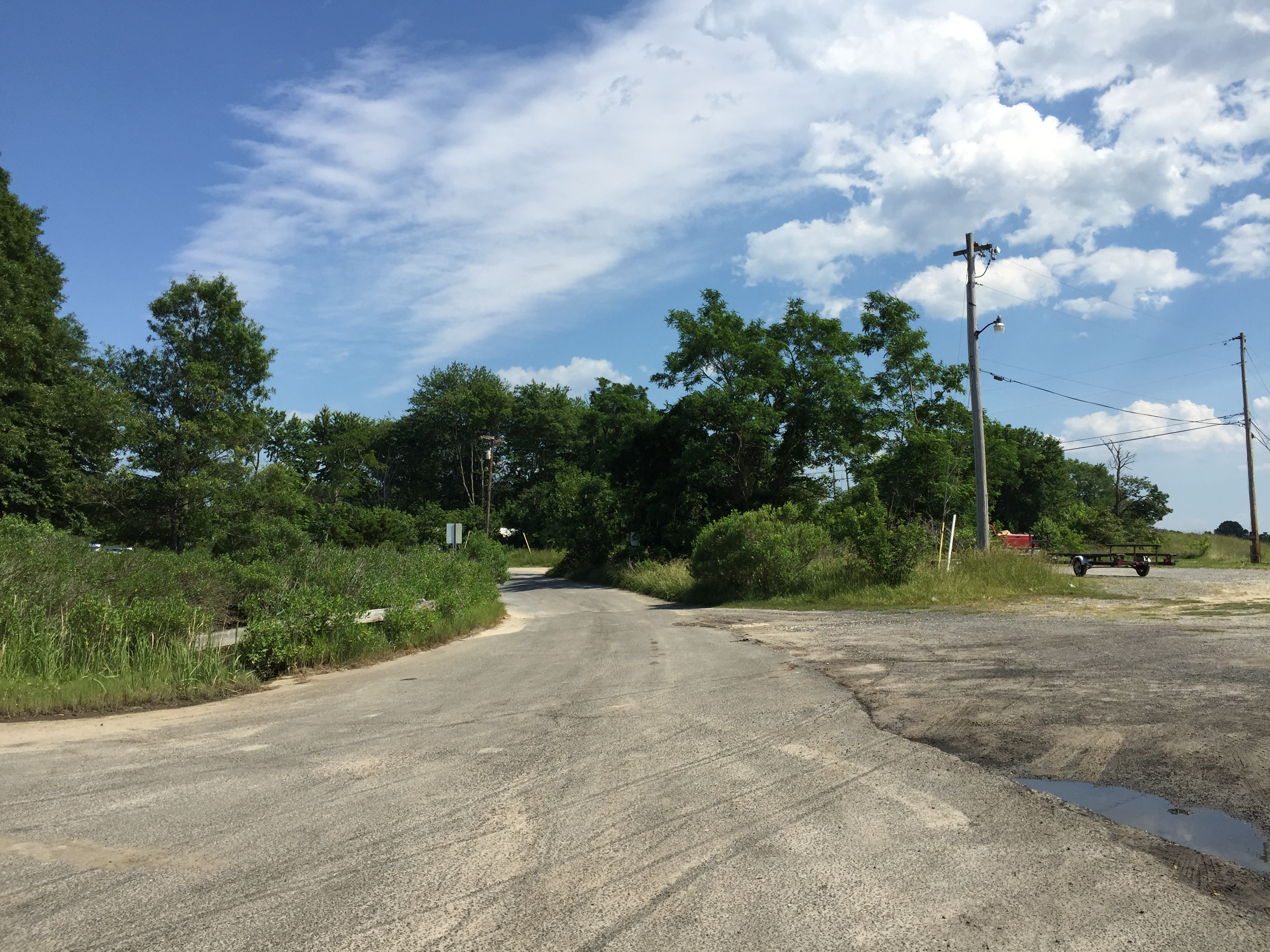
View east at the west end of MD 752 near Barstow in 2017, a short time before it was transferred to the Maryland Department of Natural Resources

Maryland Route 752 was the designation for Hallowing Lane, a 0.15-mile (0.24 km) spur south from MD 231 just east of the Benedict Bridge near Barstow. The route was transferred to the Maryland Department of Natural Resources in an agreement dated June 29, 2017.

== MD 787 ==
Maryland Route 787
- Location: Takoma Park
- Length: 0.99 mi (1,590 m)
- Existed: 1956–2012

Maryland Route 787 was the designation for Flower Avenue, which ran 0.99 miles (1.59 km) from MD 195 north to MD 320 within Takoma Park in southeastern Montgomery County. Flower Avenue from Carroll Avenue to Piney Branch Road was paved as a concrete road by 1923. The pavement was extended from Piney Branch Road north to Franklin Avenue in Silver Spring between 1931 and 1933. Flower Avenue between MD 195 and MD 516 (Franklin Avenue), was designated MD 194 by 1939. MD 194 was widened to 30 feet (9.1 m) and resurfaced with asphalt concrete from MD 195 to MD 320 in 1947. The highway from MD 320 to MD 516 was resurfaced in 1954. In 1955, MD 194 was involved in a route number swap involving three routes in different parts of the state. At the time, MD 71 was assigned to the highway connecting Frederick with Taneytown, which connected with Pennsylvania Route 194 at the Maryland–Pennsylvania state line. MD 71 was reassigned to the new Blue Star Memorial Highway on the Eastern Shore; this designation would be replaced with US 301 in 1959. The Frederick–Taneytown highway was assigned MD 194 to match its Pennsylvania counterpart. Flower Avenue's designation was changed to MD 787.

The portion of MD 787 from MD 320 to Franklin Avenue was transferred from state to county maintenance in 1999. This mileage swap, which included the transfer of MD 516 as well, was conducted to bring MD 119 (Great Seneca Highway) into the state highway system. The following year, a short segment of MD 787 south of MD 195 was removed from the state highway system. This 0.10-mile (0.16 km) segment, which extended south to Chaney Drive, had already been maintained by the city of Takoma Park. Chaney Drive had been where Flower Avenue intersected the Montgomery–Prince George's county line before the county line was moved in 1997 to place Takoma Park entirely within Montgomery County. The remaining state-maintained portion of Flower Avenue functioned as more of a city street than a state highway, and the city of Takoma Park desired to reconstruct it as a "green street" with improved stormwater management and complete sidewalks on both sides of the street. In November 2010, after a series of discussions on several state highways in the city, the Takoma Park city council proposed the city receive ownership of Flower Avenue from the state in exchange for a one-time payment of $696,000, which was the amount the Maryland State Highway Administration had planned to spend to repave MD 787. The city would use the state payment toward reconstructing Flower Avenue after ownership was transferred to the city. Flower Avenue from MD 195 to MD 320 was officially transferred from the state to the city of Takoma Park through a road transfer agreement on August 1, 2012.

== MD 801 ==
Maryland Route 801
- Location: Galena
- Length: 1.05 mi (1.69 km)
- Existed: 1957–1987

Maryland Route 801 was the designation for Irelands Corner Road, which ran 1.05 miles (1.69 km) between intersections with MD 313 on either side of MD 290 south of Galena in northeastern Kent County. The highway was originally paved in two segments. Kent County constructed the first segment, north of MD 290, with state aid as part of the 14-foot-wide (4.3 m) concrete road from Galena south to Lambson Station between 1915 and 1919. The southern segment was built as part of the Galena–Massey highway; the 15-foot-wide (4.6 m) concrete road was constructed in 1921 and 1922. MD 801 was assigned to Irelands Corner Road after MD 313 was reconstructed and relocated south from Galena in 1956 and 1957; the segment of MD 290 between MD 801 and MD 313 was constructed at the same time. MD 801 was transferred from state to county maintenance through a December 1, 1987, road transfer agreement.

== MD 803 ==
Maryland Route 803
- Location: Warwick
- Length: 1.53 mi (2.46 km)
- Existed: 1955–1979

Maryland Route 803 was the designation for two segments of Edgar Price Road with a total length of 1.53 miles (2.46 km) near Warwick in southern Cecil County. The western segment paralleled the northbound side of US 301 from MD 299 to where it curved southeast from the U.S. Highway, where the county-maintained portion of the road began. The eastern segment of MD 803 began where Edgar Price Road curved northeast. The highway met the southern end of MD 822 before reaching its eastern terminus at the Delaware state line. The portion of the county highway west from the state line was reconstructed as the eastern section of MD 803 was reconstructed as a state highway in 1955. The western section was constructed as a service road to reconnect MD 299 with Edgar Price Road, which was cut off by the construction of MD 71 (now US 301) between 1954 and 1956. MD 803 was transferred to county maintenance through a December 27, 1979, road transfer agreement.

== MD 809 ==
Maryland Route 809
- Location: Calvert, Fair Hill
- Existed: 1958–1979

Maryland Route 809 was the designation for a pair of sections of old alignment of MD 273 at Calvert and near Fair Hill in northern Cecil County.

- MD 809 was the designation for Brick Meetinghouse Road, which ran 0.91 miles (1.46 km) between junctions with MD 273 on either side of Calvert. The route was created when MD 273 was relocated through Calvert in 1958. MD 809 was transferred from state to county maintenance in two sections. The 0.44-mile-long (0.71 km) segment west of MD 272 was transferred in a February 25, 1976, road transfer agreement; part of this road no longer exists. The remaining 0.47-mile-long (0.76 km) east of MD 272 was transferred by the agreement of December 27, 1979.
- MD 809A was the designation for Stonehouse Lane, which ran 0.32 miles (0.51 km) from a dead end east to MD 273 west of the main route's bridge across Big Elk Creek near Fair Hill. The route was created when MD 273 was relocated east of Fair Hill in 1965. MD 809A was transferred from state to county maintenance in the December 27, 1979, road transfer agreement.

== MD 811 ==
Maryland Route 811
- Location: Rising Sun
- Length: 0.19 mi (310 m)
- Existed: 1958–1979

Maryland Route 811 was the designation for Wilson Avenue, which ran 0.19 miles (0.31 km) from the south town limit of Rising Sun north to MD 273 within Rising Sun in northern Cecil County. The highway was created after the portion of MD 276 between Woodlawn and the town limit of Rising Sun was transferred to county maintenance and MD 276 was placed in its present corridor through a road transfer agreement on May 8, 1958. MD 811 was transferred from state to town maintenance in a road transfer agreement on January 5, 1979.

== MD 812 ==
Maryland Route 812
- Location: Singerly
- Existed: 1958–1982

Maryland Route 812 was the designation for a pair of sections of old alignment of MD 280 (now MD 213) near Singerly in northeastern Cecil County. Both routes were created after MD 280 was relocated north of Singerly between 1956 and 1958. Based on a November 20, 1978, road transfer agreement, both segments of MD 812 were transferred from state to county maintenance after the highways were resurfaced with bituminous concrete in May 1982.

- MD 812 was the designation for Cherry Hill Road, which ran 1.11 miles (1.79 km) from MD 213 south of Molitor Road to MD 213 north of Elk Mills Road.
- MD 812A was the designation for a 0.05-mile (0.080 km) spur from MD 812 to a dead end at the north end of the unsuffixed highway.

== MD 813 (1963–1979) ==
Maryland Route 813
- Location: Woodlawn–Harrisville
- Existed: 1963–1979

Maryland Route 813 was the designation for a pair of sections of old alignments of MD 276 between Woodlawn and Harrisville in western Cecil County. Both routes were created after MD 276 was relocated between Woodlawn and MD 269 (Liberty Grove Road) south of Harrisville in 1962 and 1963. Both segments of MD 813 were transferred from state to county maintenance in a road transfer agreement on December 27, 1979.

- MD 813 was the designation for Sale Barn Road, which ran 0.25 miles (0.40 km) between junctions with MD 276 south of MD 269.
- MD 813A was the designation for Harrisville Road, which ran 2.09 miles (3.36 km) from a dead end south of Liberty Grove Road to MD 273 in Harrisville. MD 813A briefly had its northern end at MD 269; the highway was extended north to Harrisville after MD 276 was relocated between MD 269 and MD 273 in 1963 and 1964.

== MD 814 ==
Maryland Route 814
- Location: Creagerstown
- Length: 0.29 mi (470 m)

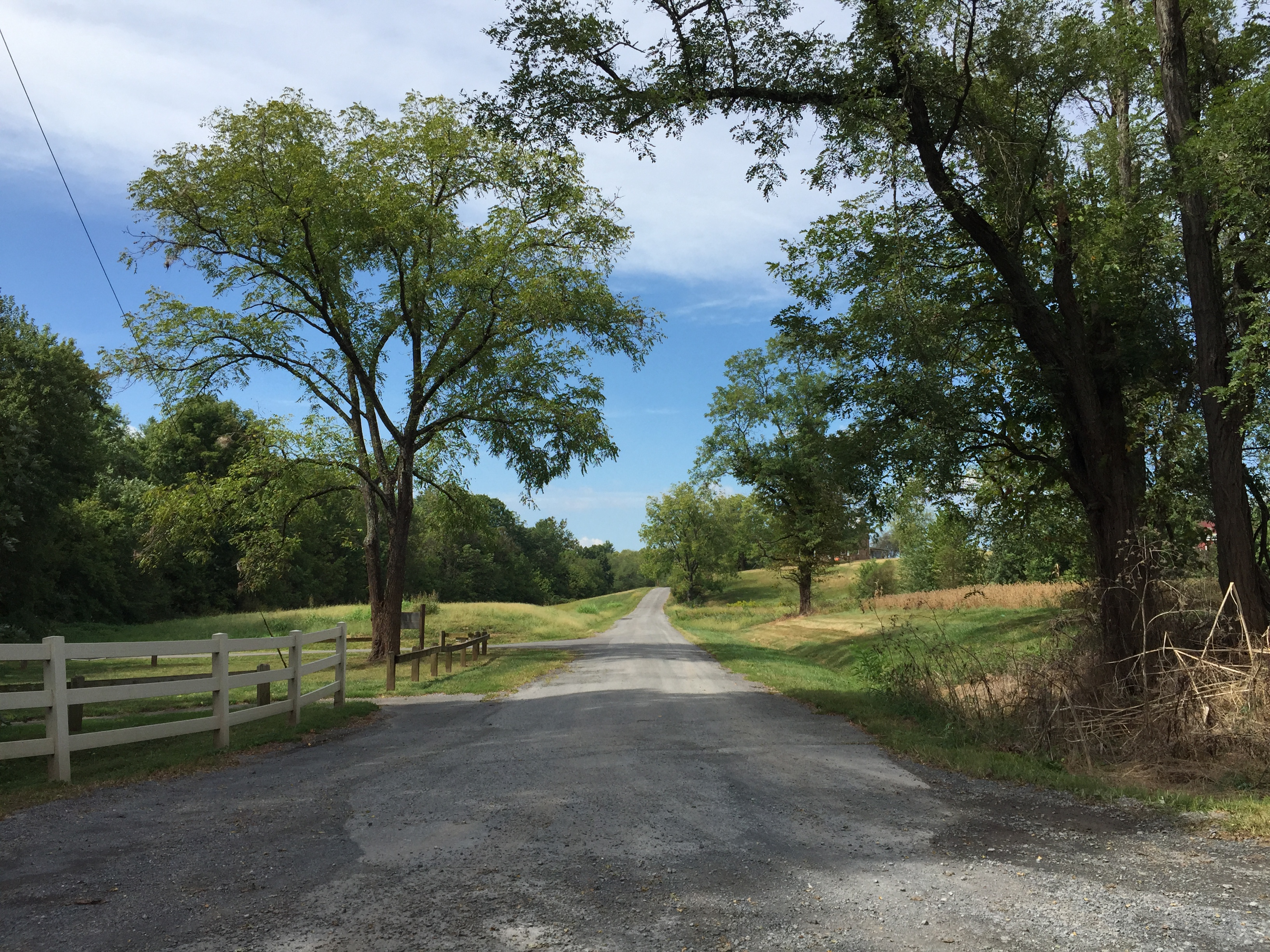
View north from the south end of MD 814 near Creagerstown in 2016, a short time before it was transferred to county maintenance

Maryland Route 814 was the unnamed designation for the 0.29-mile (0.47 km) section of old alignment of MD 550 just north of the Monocacy River near Creagerstown, Frederick County. The route was transferred to county maintenance on October 31, 2016, and became known as Penterra Manor Lane.

== MD 822 (1955–1979) ==
Maryland Route 822
- Location: Warwick
- Length: 0.65 mi (1,050 m)
- Existed: 1955–1979

Maryland Route 822 was the designation for the 0.65-mile-long (1.05 km) section of Joe Meltz Road north from Edgar Price Road, which was then part of MD 803, near Warwick in southern Cecil County. The highway was constructed concurrently with MD 803 in 1955. MD 822 was transferred to county maintenance through a December 27, 1979, road transfer agreement.

== MD 823 ==
Maryland Route 823
- Location: Elkton
- Length: 0.61 mi (980 m)
- Existed: 1962–1979

Maryland Route 823 was the designation for Belle Hill Road, which ran 0.61 miles (0.98 km) from MD 316 east to MD 279 near Elkton in northeastern Cecil County. The highway was created after MD 279 was moved to its present course between MD 316 and Belle Hill Road in 1962. MD 823 was transferred from state to county maintenance in a road transfer agreement on December 27, 1979.

== MD 835 (1953–1958) ==
Maryland Route 835
- Location: Rising Sun
- Length: 0.26 mi (420 m)
- Existed: 1953–1958

Maryland Route 835 was the designation for a 0.26-mile-long (0.42 km) section of old alignment of US 1 (now MD 273) near Rising Sun in northwestern Cecil County. The highway formed a loop on the south side of US 1 west from the western town limit of Rising Sun at Stone Run toward Harrisville. MD 835 was assigned to the loop of old alignment after US 1 was reconstructed and straightened west of Rising Sun in 1952 and 1953. The highway was transferred from state to county maintenance through a May 8, 1958, road transfer agreement. The loop that comprised MD 835 ceased to exist as a road by 1971.

== MD 857 ==
Maryland Route 857
- Location: Still Pond
- Length: 0.39 mi (630 m)
- Existed: 1959–1987

Maryland Route 857 was the designation for Medders Road and the portion of Rosedale Cannery Road east of Medders Road, which had a length of 0.39 miles (0.63 km) between intersections with MD 566 in Still Pond in northern Kent County. The highway was created in 1959 after MD 566 was moved to its present straighter alignment in Still Pond. MD 857 was transferred from state to county maintenance in a December 1, 1987, road transfer agreement.

== MD 859 ==
Maryland Route 859
- Location: Chestertown, Morgnec
- Existed: 1963–1987

MD 859 was the designation for three stretches of old alignment of MD 291 between Chestertown and Morgnec in central Kent County.

- MD 859A was the designation for the 0.16-mile-long (0.26 km) section of old alignment of MD 291 on the east side of Morgan Creek. The highway was paved as a concrete road and designated MD 447 in 1930. This section of MD 447 became part of MD 291 in 1963. The segment was bypassed and became MD 859A when MD 291's S-curve east of Morgan Creek was made smoother when the highway was reconstructed in 1964. MD 859A was removed from the state highway system in 1967, and the road itself was removed by 1976.
- MD 859B was the designation for Morgnec Cutoff Road or Old Morgnec Road from a tangent intersection with MD 291 east 0.88 miles (1.42 km) to a dead end east of Morgnec Cutoff Road at Morgnec. The highway west of the intersection of Morgnec Cutoff Road and Old Morgnec Road was built as a concrete road as part of MD 447, which turned north away from the Chester River at Morgnec, between 1930 and 1933. Old Morgnec Road was a county highway, River Road, from Morgnec toward Millington. The portion of MD 447 through Morgnec and part of the county highway east of MD 447 were bypassed by a westward extension of MD 291 in 1962 and 1963. MD 859B was transferred from state to county maintenance through a December 1, 1987. road transfer agreement.
- MD 859C was the designation for Hadaway Drive, which ran 0.30 miles (0.48 km) from MD 213 east to a tangent intersection with MD 291 in Chestertown. The highway was originally built as a concrete road as part of MD 447 in 1930. What is now Hadaway Drive became part of MD 291 in 1963. MD 859C was assigned to the highway after MD 291 was relocated during reconstruction of the highway in 1965 and 1966. The highway was transferred from state to municipal maintenance through an August 11, 1978, agreement.

== MD 873 ==
Maryland Route 873
- Location: Emmitsburg
- Length: 0.37 mi (600 m)

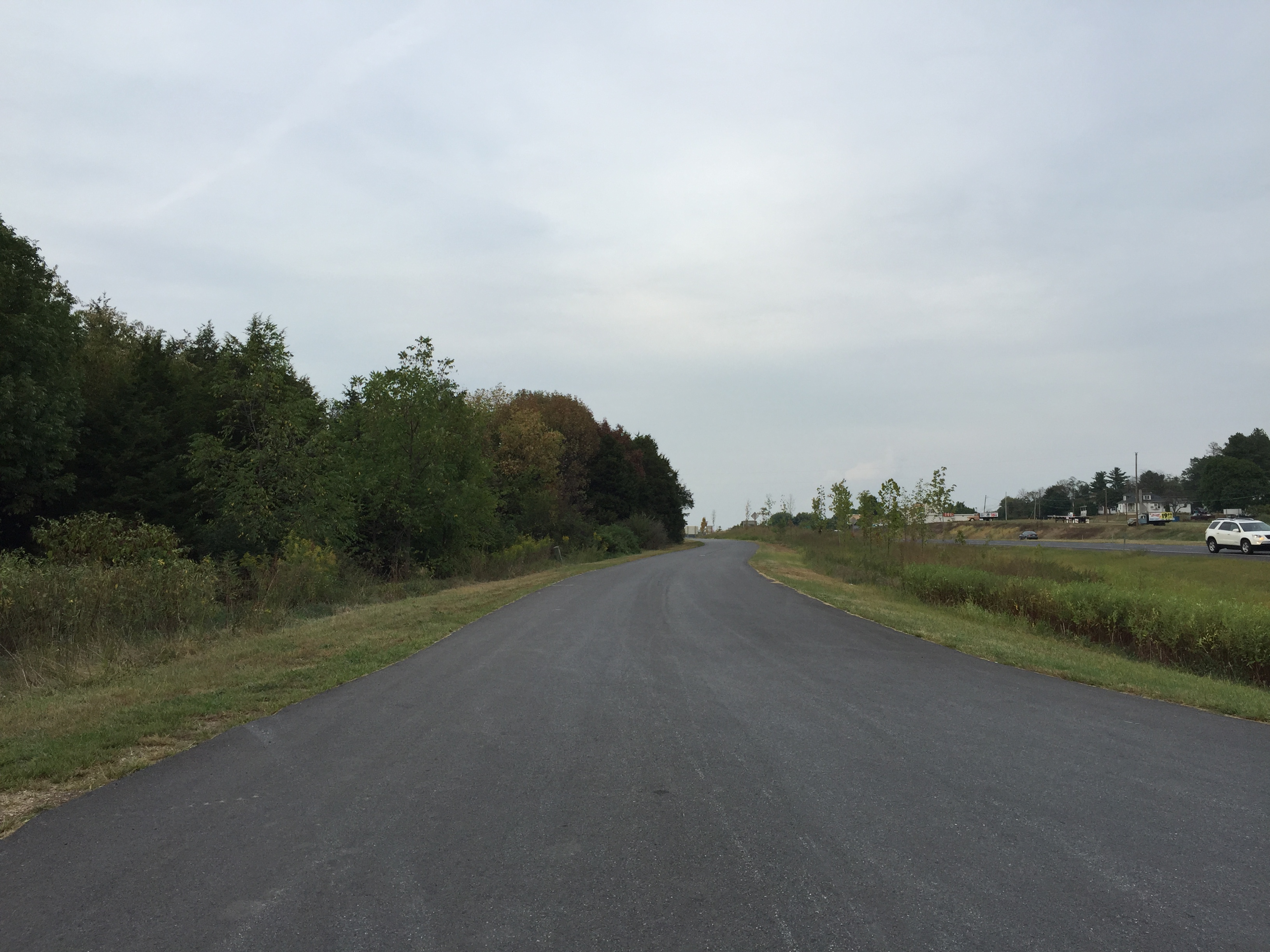
View north along MD 873 past US 15 Bus. near Emmitsburg in 2016, a short time before it was transferred to county maintenance

Maryland Route 873 was the designation for the unnamed 0.37-mile (0.60 km) service road that paralleled the southbound direction of US 15 north from US 15 Business north of Emmitsburg just south of the Pennsylvania state line in Frederick County. The route was transferred to county maintenance on October 31, 2016, and became known as North Seton Avenue.

== MD 878 ==
Maryland Route 878
- Location: Hagerstown
- Length: 0.10 mi (160 m)

Maryland Route 878 was the unnamed designation for a 0.10-mile (0.16 km) service road spur from Broadfording Road west to a dead end immediately southeast of MD 58's interchange with I-81 in Hagerstown. The route was removed from the state highway system in 2015 and transferred to the city of Hagerstown.

== MD 880 ==
Maryland Route 880
- Location: Buckeystown
- Length: 1.17 mi (1.88 km)
- Existed: 1975–2008

Maryland Route 880 was the designation for Michaels Mill Road, a 1.17-mile (1.88 km) route that ran from MD 85 east to MD 80 in Buckeystown, Frederick County. MD 880 was designated in 1975 on the former alignment of MD 80 after that route was shifted south to a new alignment. On November 18, 2008, MD 880 was removed from the state highway system and transferred to Frederick County.

== MD 895 ==
Maryland Route 895
- Location: White Oak
- Length: 0.80 mi (1,290 m)
- Existed: 1975–1999

Maryland Route 895 was the designation for Lockwood Drive, a 0.80-mile (1.29 km) route that ran from US 29 to MD 650. The highway was transferred to county maintenance in 1999 as part of a highway swap to designate Great Seneca Highway as MD 119.

== MD 901 ==
Maryland Route 901
- Location: Boyds
- Length: 0.74 mi (1,190 m)
- Existed: 1975–1999

Maryland Route 901 was the designation for Whelan Lane, a 0.74-mile (1.19 km) route that ran from MD 121 to the end of state maintenance. The highway was transferred to county maintenance in 1999 as part of a highway swap to designate Great Seneca Highway as MD 119.

== MD 912 ==
Maryland Route 912
- Location: Earleville
- Existed: 1967–1979

Maryland Route 912 was the designation for a pair of highways near Earleville in southern Cecil County.

- MD 912 was the designation for an L-shaped 0.09-mile-long (0.14 km) highway along segments of Peddlers Lane in Earleville.
- MD 912A was the designation for Old Crystal Beach Road, which ran 0.56 miles (0.90 km) between a pair of intersections with MD 282 on either side of Glebe Road north of Earleville.

Both highways were originally part of MD 283, which was paved as a concrete road on the north side of Earleville in 1928. MD 912 was assigned to the L-shaped part of Peddlers Lane after MD 282 was reconstructed and relocated from Cecilton to north of Earleville in 1966 and 1967; MD 282 had previously had a right-angle turn at Peddlers Lane. MD 912A was bypassed when MD 282 was relocated north of Earleville in 1967 and 1968; MD 282 had previously turned at a four-way intersection with Grove Neck Road and Sandy Bottom Road. MD 912 and MD 912A were transferred to county maintenance through a December 27, 1979, road transfer agreement.

== MD 913 ==
Maryland Route 913
- Location: Charlestown
- Length: 0.19 mi (310 m)
- Existed: 1968–1974

Maryland Route 913 was the designation for the 0.19-mile-long (0.31 km) piece of old MD 267 at its former railroad crossing of the Pennsylvania Railroad (now Amtrak's Northeast Corridor) on the west side of Charlestown in western Cecil County. The highway was assigned in 1968 after MD 267 was relocated over a new bridge at the site called Weber's Bridge. MD 913 was removed from the state highway system in 1974.

== MD 983 ==
Maryland Route 983
- Location: North Laurel, Scaggsville
- Existed: 1963–2017

Maryland Route 983 (MD 983) was the unsigned designation for parts of the old alignment of MD 216 on either side of Interstate 95 (I-95) in North Laurel in southeastern Howard County, Maryland. MD 983 had a length of 1.02 miles (1.64 km) and ran on the east side of I-95. MD 983A spanned 0.71 miles (1.14 km) on the west side of I-95. MD 216 through North Laurel was built in the early 1920s. The segments of MD 983 were designated when MD 216 was relocated east of I-95 in the early 1960s and west of I-95 in the late 1970s. In 2017, both MD 983 and MD 983A were removed from the state highway system and transferred to county maintenance.

== MD 987 ==
Maryland Route 987
- Location: Ellicott City
- Existed: 1950–1993

Maryland Route 987 was the designation for Old Columbia Pike, which ran from US 29 just south of MD 103 north to Main Street in Ellicott City in northeastern Howard County. The highway was originally built as the northern end of the Ellicott and Clarksville Turnpike in the 19th century. The old turnpike was reconstructed as a 14-foot-wide (4.3 m) macadam road in 1918. In 1927, the highway became part of the original MD 27, which was replaced by US 29 in 1934. MD 987 was assigned to old Columbia Pike after US 29 was moved to its current course from south of MD 103 to US 40 in 1951. The portion of the highway north of MD 103 was removed from the state highway system in 1987. The very short piece south of MD 103 remained until the construction of the US 29–MD 100 interchange in 1993.

== MD 996 ==
Maryland Route 996
- Location: Bethesda
- Length: 0.49 mi (790 m)
- Existed: 1985–1996

Maryland Route 996 was the designation for the portion of Eggert Drive from MD 191 (Persimmon Tree Rd) to the end of state maintenance near Tammy Court. The highway was transferred to county maintenance in 1999 as part of a highway swap to designate Great Seneca Highway as MD 119, along with the portion of MD 191 south and east of MD 190 via Bradley Blvd and Persimmon Tree Rd.

== MD 999 ==
Maryland Route 999
- Location: Glen Burnie
- Length: 0.24 mi (390 m)
- Existed: 2001–2002

Maryland Route 999 (officially MD 999D) was the designation for Old Hammonds Ferry Road, which ran 0.24 miles (0.39 km) from Stewart Avenue north to a cul-de-sac adjacent to MD 176 between that route's junctions with MD 162 and I-97 near Glen Burnie. MD 999D was created in a road transfer from Anne Arundel County to the state in 2001. The highway was transferred back to county maintenance in 2002.
