= Dudley Corners, Maryland =

Unincorporated community in Maryland, United States

- Unincorporated community
- Location within Maryland
- Coordinates: 39°11′02″N 75°53′31″W
- Country: United States
- State: Maryland
- County: Queen Anne's
- Elevation: 39 ft (12 m)
- Time zone: UTC-5 (Eastern (EST))
  - Summer (DST): UTC-4 (EDT)
- Area codes: 410 & 443
- GNIS feature ID: 597353

Dudley Corners is an unincorporated community in Queen Anne's County, Maryland, United States. Dudley Corners is located at the junction of Maryland routes 290 and 300, 1.8 miles (2.9 km) west of Sudlersville.
