= St. Andrew's Episcopal Chapel (Sudlersville, Maryland) =

Historic church in Maryland, United States

- U.S. National Register of Historic Places
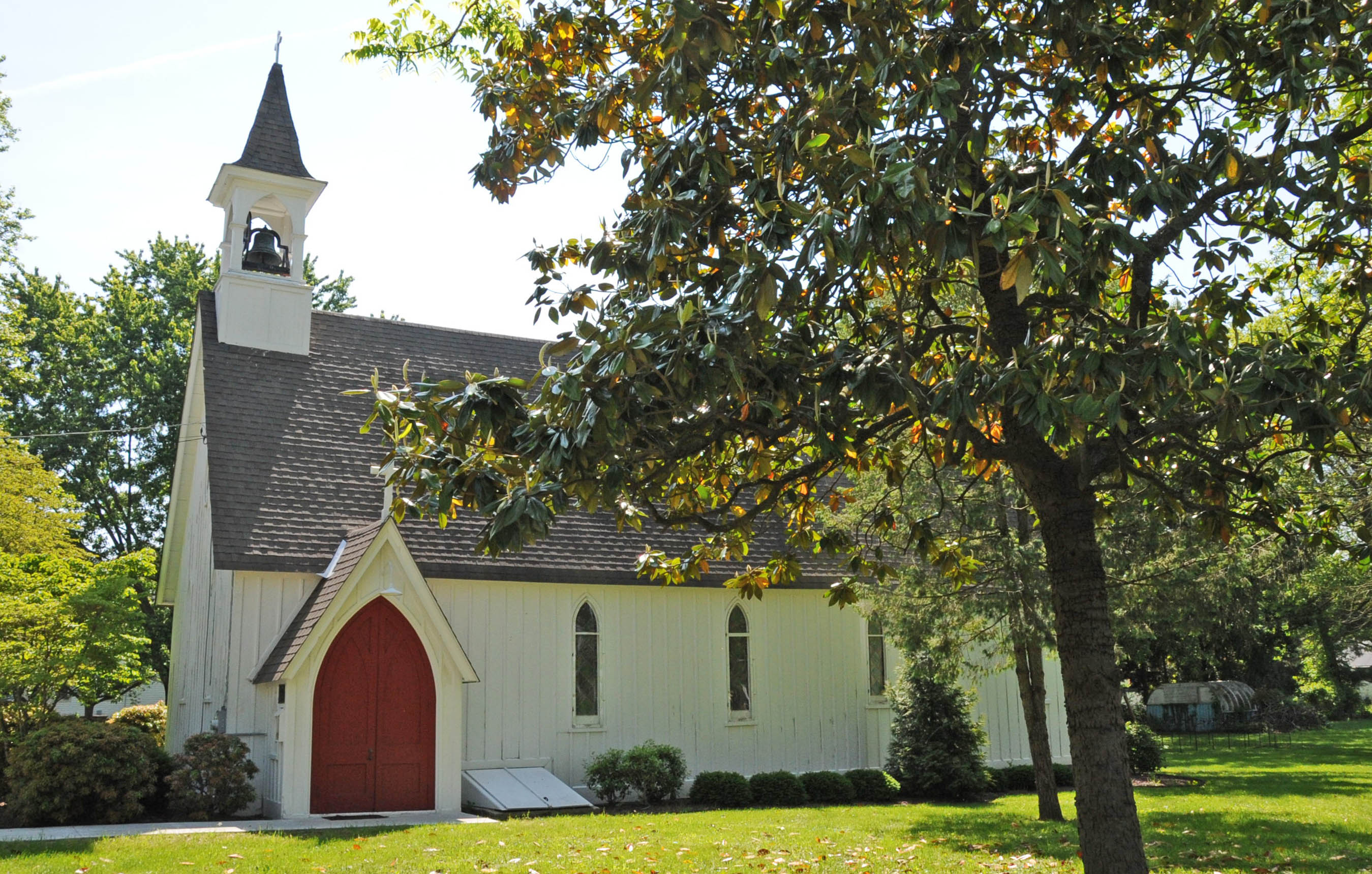

- Location within Maryland Location within the United States
- Location: Church St. and Maple Ave., Sudlersville, Maryland
- Coordinates: 39°11′6″N 75°51′30″W
- Area: 2 acres (0.81 ha)
- Built: 1878
- Architect: Gadd, Abraham J.
- Architectural style: Late Gothic Revival
- NRHP reference No.: 84001853
- Added to NRHP: September 7, 1984

St. Andrew's Episcopal Chapel is an historic Episcopal chapel located at Sudlersville, Queen Anne's County, Maryland, built as a chapel of ease for St. Luke's Church in Church Hill. It was listed on the National Register of Historic Places in 1984.

A small Carpenter Gothic-style board-and-batten structure constructed in 1878, it divided into two principal parts: a large rectangular sanctuary three bays long and two bays wide with a steeply pitched gable roof, and a slightly smaller but similarly proportioned chancel, two bays long and one bay wide. The entry features a wide Gothic-arched double doorway with a steep gable roof. The sanctuary has a pair of stained glass lancet windows on the first floor, and a circular stained glass rose window in the upper gable.
