= Chesterville Brick House =

Historic house in Maryland, United States

- U.S. National Register of Historic Places
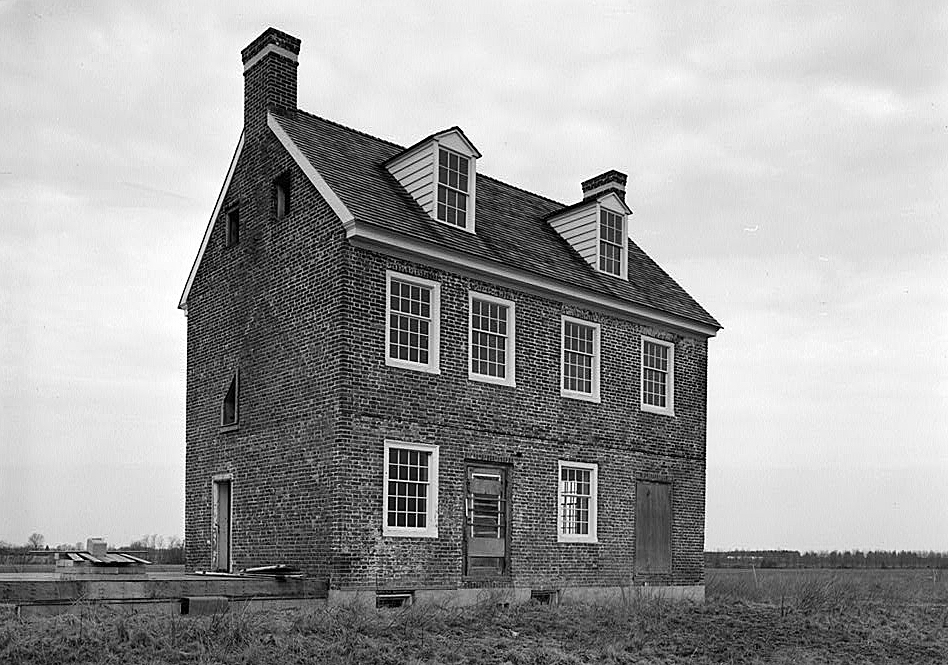
- The house in 1978

- Location within Maryland Location within the United States
- Location: Jct. of MD 290 and MD 444, Chesterville, Maryland
- Coordinates: 39°16′36″N 75°54′57″W
- Built: 1773
- NRHP reference No.: 79001139
- Added to NRHP: July 17, 1979

Chesterville Brick House, also known as Goodings Store, Isaac Spencer House and Salter House, is a historic home and former commercial building located at Chesterville, Kent County, Maryland, United States. It is a 2 1/2-story brick building, thought to have been built about 1773. The building has changed ownership many times. It was originally located on the northwest corner of the intersection of Maryland Route 447 (now Maryland Route 444) and Maryland Route 290, abandoned in 1970, and vandalized prior to being moved in 1973; approximately 250 feet from its original site.

It was listed on the National Register of Historic Places in 1979.

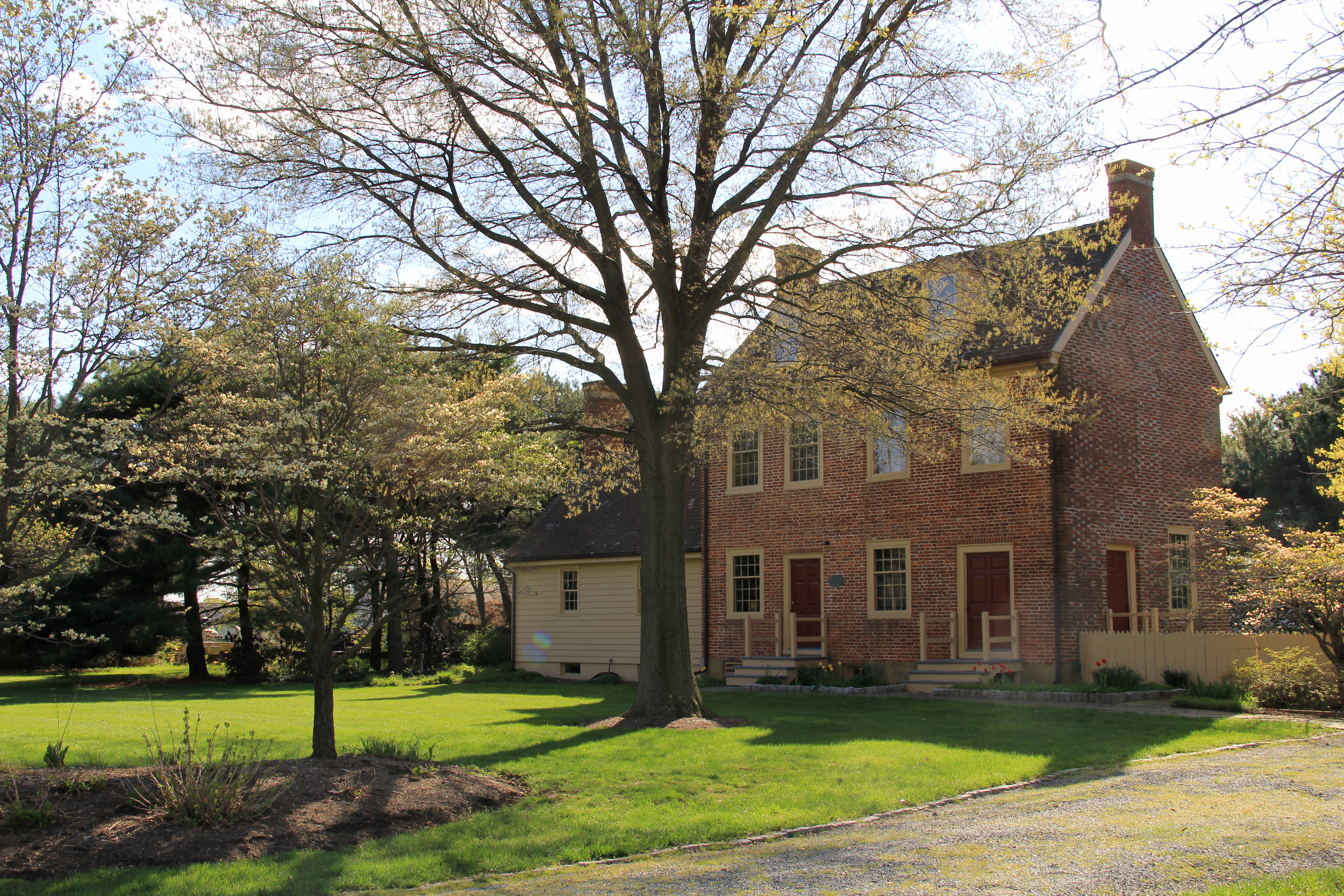
Chesterville Brick House in 2015.
