= Chesterville, Maryland =

Unincorporated community in Maryland, U.S.

Coordinates: 39°16′32″N 75°54′56″W

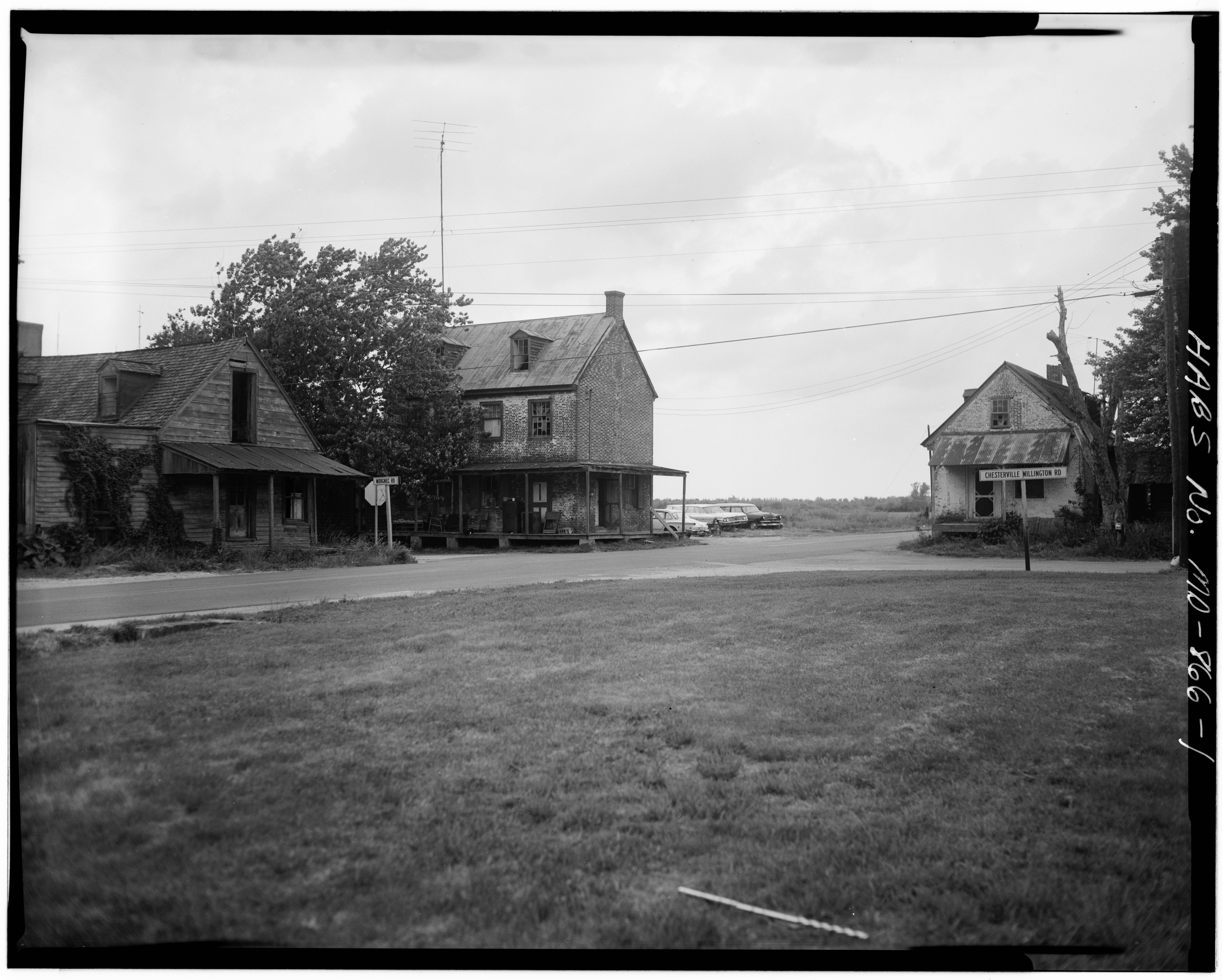
General view of crossroads of Morganec Road and Maryland Route 290, at Chesterville, Maryland. Chesterville Brick House (left), Hotel (center), and Chesterville Store (right).

Chesterville is an unincorporated community in Kent County, Maryland, United States. It is located at the intersection of Maryland routes 290 and 447.

Chesterville Brick House was listed on the National Register of Historic Places in 1979.

== Education ==
It is in the Kent County Public Schools. Kent County Middle School is in Chestertown, and Kent County High School is in an unincorporated area, in the Butlertown CDP with a Worton postal address.

The community was formerly assigned to Millington Elementary School. In 2017 the school board voted to close Millington Elementary School.
