= Dudley's Chapel =

Historic church in Maryland, US

- U.S. National Register of Historic Places
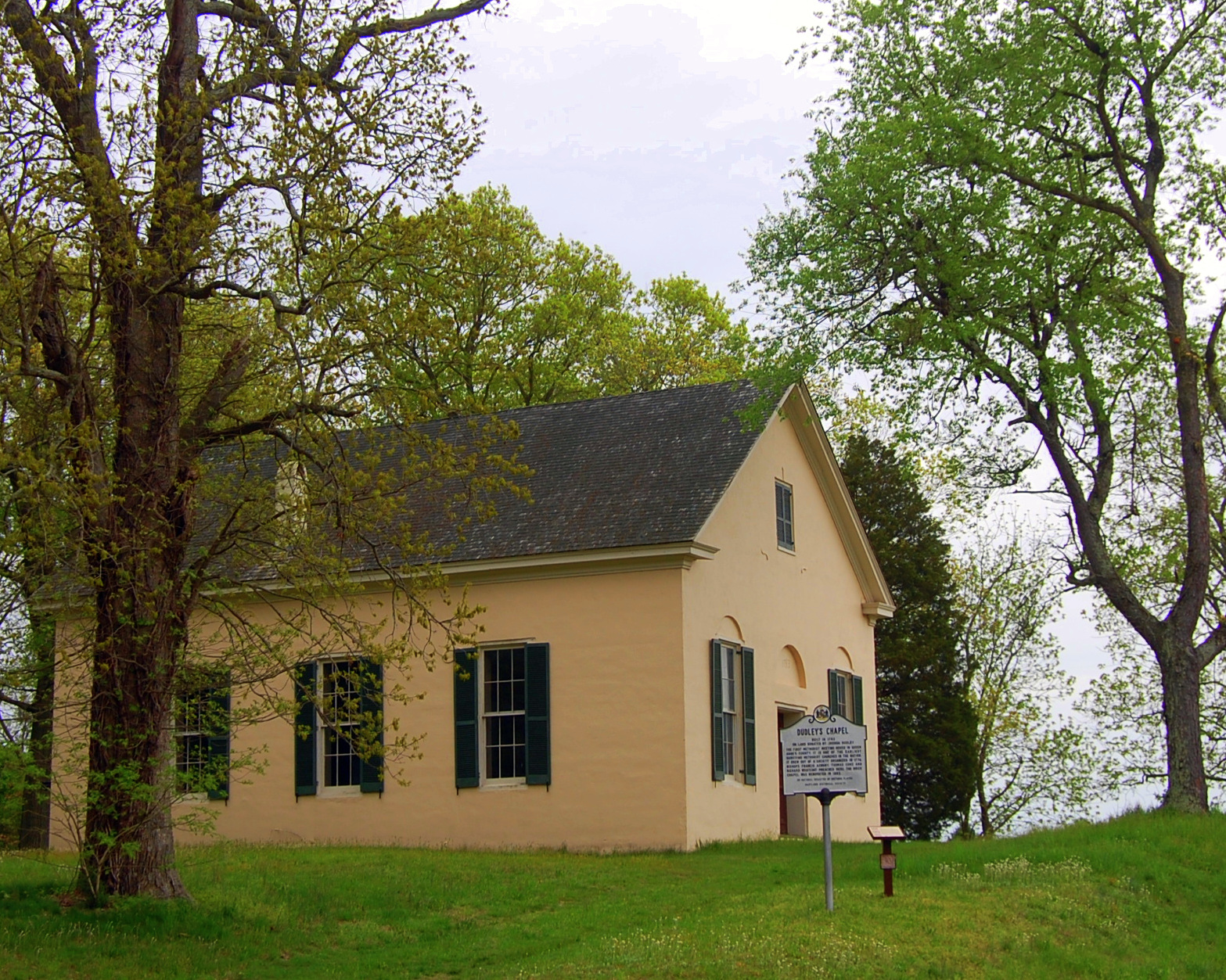

- Location within Maryland Location within the United States
- Location: Benton Corners Road, Sudlersville, Maryland
- Coordinates: 39°10′56″N 75°53′33″W
- Area: 1.6 acres (0.65 ha)
- Built: 1783
- Architectural style: Victorian
- NRHP reference No.: 79003124
- Added to NRHP: November 15, 1979

Dudley's Chapel is a historic Methodist church located near Sudlersville, Queen Anne's County, Maryland. It was built in 1783 and is a simple brick structure with a moderately pitched gable roof. A coat of stucco was added in 1883, covering all of the original brickwork. The chapel has a prominent place in the early history of the Methodist Church in Maryland. It is one of the earliest surviving Methodist churches in Maryland, and was the first Methodist church built in Queen Anne's County. Many of the prominent early leaders of the Methodist Church are known to have preached both at Dudley's including Francis Asbury, Thomas Coke, Richard Whatcoat, Jesse Lee, and Freeborn Garrettson.

It was listed on the National Register of Historic Places in 1979.
