= Galena, Maryland =

- Town
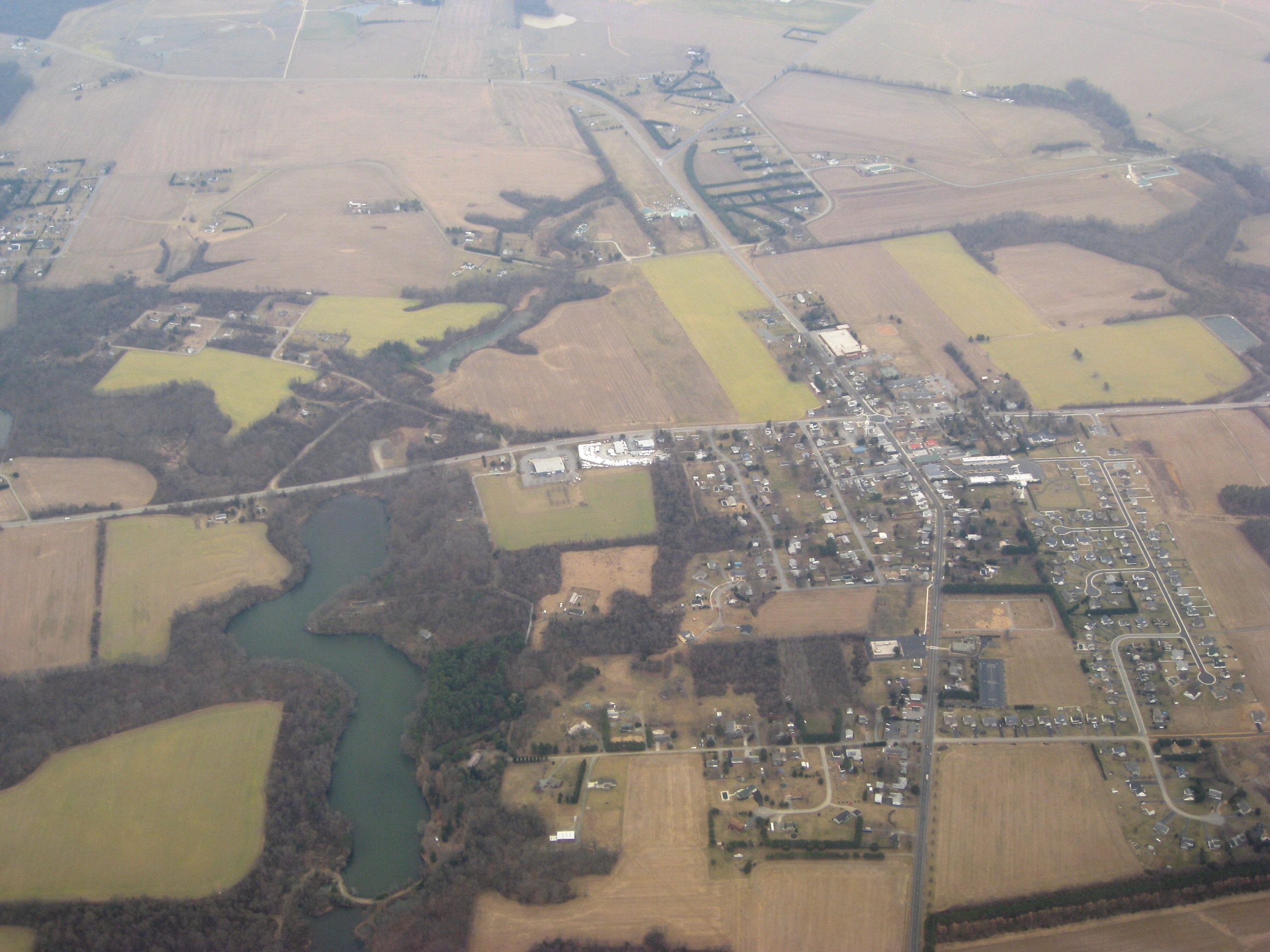
- Aerial image of Galena

- Flag Seal

- Location of Galena, Maryland
- Coordinates: 39°20′30″N 75°52′42″W
- Country: United States
- State: Maryland
- County: Kent
- Incorporated: 1858

Government
  - Mayor: John Carroll

Area
  - Total: 0.36 sq mi (0.93 km^{2})
  - Land: 0.36 sq mi (0.93 km^{2})
  - Water: 0 sq mi (0.00 km^{2})
- Elevation: 69 ft (21 m)

Population (2020)
  - Total: 539
  - Density: 1,494.5/sq mi (577.04/km^{2})
- Time zone: UTC-5 (Eastern (EST))
  - Summer (DST): UTC-4 (EDT)
- ZIP code: 21635
- Area code: 410
- FIPS code: 24-31225
- GNIS feature ID: 0590270
- Website: www.townofgalena.com

Galena is a town in Kent County, Maryland, United States. As of the 2020 census, Galena had a population of 539.

== Geography ==
Galena is located at 39°20′30″N 75°52′42″W (39.341680, -75.878444).

According to the United States Census Bureau, the town has a total area of 0.36 square miles (0.93 km^{2}), all land.

== History ==
Galena was founded in 1763 under the name Down's Cross Roads, after William Downs, a local tavern owner. The name was later changed to Georgetown Cross Roads sometime before 1813, and finally to Galena in 1858. The name comes from a supposed silver mine in the vicinity of the town, which extracted the metal from the lead ore known as galena. There is, however, no geological evidence for galena deposits on Maryland's Eastern Shore, and the story is likely apocryphal.

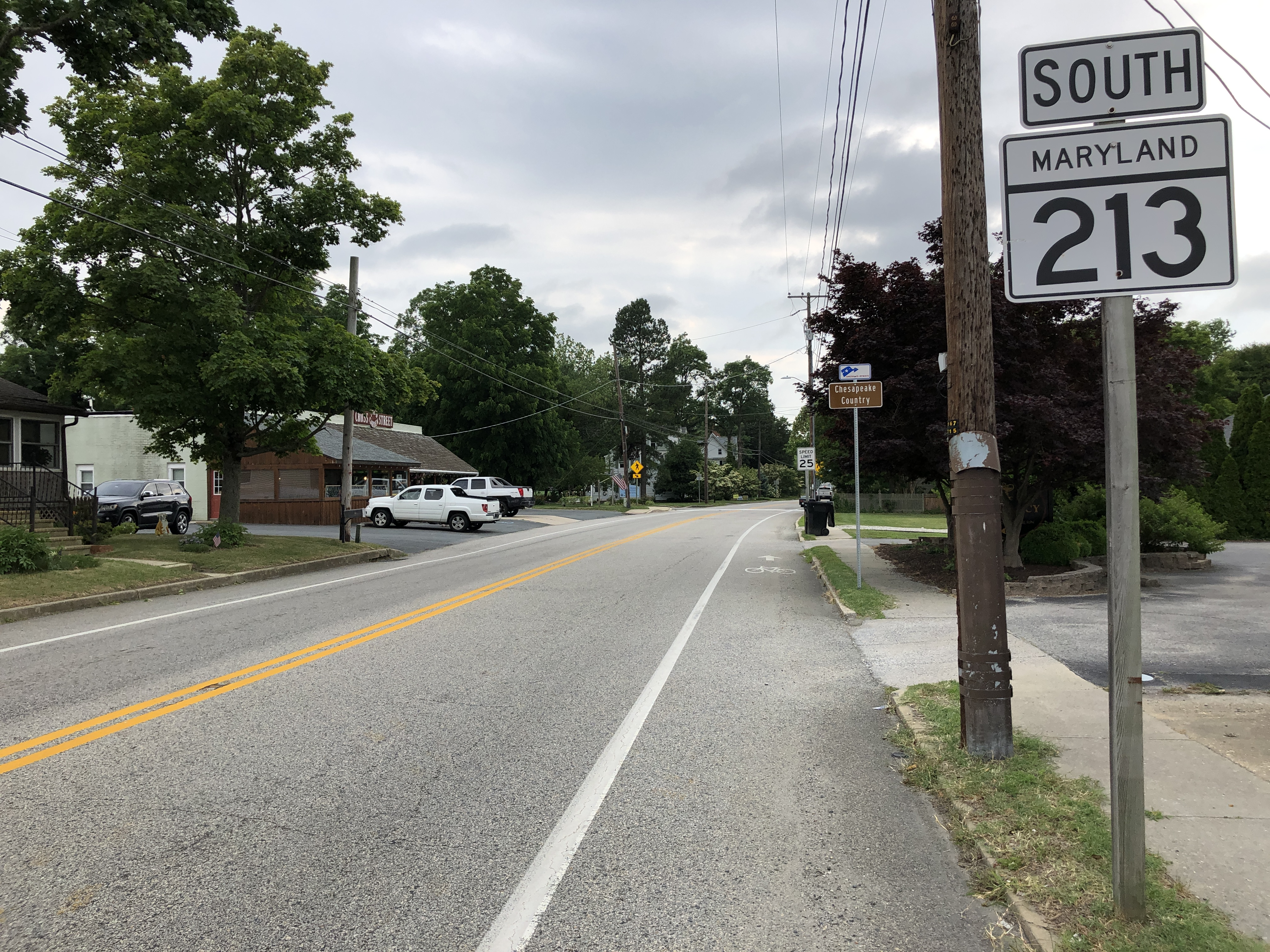
MD 213 southbound in Galena

== Transportation ==
The primary means of transportation to and from Galena is by road, and several state highways serve the town. Maryland Route 213 is the most prominent of these, entering the town from the north and exiting to the west on its generally north-south route along the eastern shore of the Chesapeake Bay. Maryland Route 290 does the opposite, entering from the south and departing towards the east, with the two highways meeting at a crossroads in downtown Galena. A third highway, Maryland Route 313, runs concurrently along MD 290 from its junction with MD 213 southwards, separating from MD 290 a short distance south of town on its way towards the southern Delmarva.

== Businesses ==
Galena is home to a variety of small businesses for its size. Along with many antique shops, there is a diner, confectionery shop, convenience store and deli, organic and health foods market, pizza parlor, recording studio, and wedding videography studio.

== Demographics ==
Historical population
Census	Pop.	Note	%±
1880	347		—
1890	266		−23.3%
1900	251		−5.6%
1910	262		4.4%
1920	298		13.7%
1930	265		−11.1%
1940	250		−5.7%
1950	259		3.6%
1960	299		15.4%
1970	361		20.7%
1980	374		3.6%
1990	324		−13.4%
2000	428		32.1%
2010	612		43.0%
2020	539		−11.9%
U.S. Decennial Census

=== 2010 census ===
As of the census of 2010, there were 612 people, 271 households, and 169 families living in the town. The population density was 1,700.0 inhabitants per square mile (656.4/km^{2}). There were 284 housing units at an average density of 788.9 per square mile (304.6/km^{2}). The racial makeup of the town was 91.3% White, 2.3% African American, 0.2% Native American, 0.3% Asian, 3.9% from other races, and 2.0% from two or more races. Hispanic or Latino of any race were 6.0% of the population.

There were 271 households, of which 26.2% had children under the age of 18 living with them, 52.0% were married couples living together, 7.0% had a female householder with no husband present, 3.3% had a male householder with no wife present, and 37.6% were non-families. 32.8% of all households were made up of individuals, and 14.8% had someone living alone who was 65 years of age or older. The average household size was 2.26 and the average family size was 2.88.

The median age in the town was 45.1 years. 20.1% of residents were under the age of 18; 6.5% were between the ages of 18 and 24; 23.2% were from 25 to 44; 29.4% were from 45 to 64; and 20.8% were 65 years of age or older. The gender makeup of the town was 47.5% male and 52.5% female.

=== 2000 census ===
As of the census of 2000, there were 428 people, 190 households, and 121 families living in the town. The population density was 1,208.2 inhabitants per square mile (466.5/km^{2}). There were 202 housing units at an average density of 570.2 per square mile (220.2/km^{2}). The racial makeup of the town was 95.79% White, 3.50% African American, and 0.70% from two or more races. Hispanic or Latino of any race were 0.70% of the population.

There were 190 households, out of which 27.9% had children under the age of 18 living with them, 54.7% were married couples living together, 7.4% had a female householder with no husband present, and 35.8% were non-families. 33.2% of all households were made up of individuals, and 23.7% had someone living alone who was 65 years of age or older. The average household size was 2.23 and the average family size was 2.85.

In the town, the population was spread out, with 23.6% under the age of 18, 1.9% from 18 to 24, 27.6% from 25 to 44, 24.5% from 45 to 64, and 22.4% who were 65 years of age or older. The median age was 43 years. For every 100 females, there were 83.7 males. For every 100 females age 18 and over, there were 78.7 males.

The median income for a household in the town was $47,813, and the median income for a family was $53,068. Males had a median income of $35,096 versus $22,500 for females. The per capita income for the town was $18,858. About 1.6% of families and 4.7% of the population were below the poverty line, including none of those under age 18 and 6.5% of those age 65 or over.

== Education ==
It is in the Kent County Public Schools. Galena Elementary School is in the town. Kent County Middle School is in Chestertown, and Kent County High School is in an unincorporated area with a Worton postal address.

The former Galena High School consolidated into Kent County High in 1971, with the former Galena High becoming Galena Middle. The former Galena Middle School consolidated into Kent County Middle in Chestertown in 2010. The former middle school building became Galena Elementary School in 2010. Before Galena Elementary existed, it was assigned to Millington Elementary.

Kent County public library maintains the North County Branch.
