= Crumpton, Maryland =

- Census-designated place
- Location within Maryland
- Coordinates: 39°14′29″N 75°55′18″W
- Country: United States
- State: Maryland
- County: Queen Anne's

Area
  - Total: 1.05 sq mi (2.71 km^{2})
  - Land: 0.94 sq mi (2.43 km^{2})
  - Water: 0.11 sq mi (0.28 km^{2})
- Elevation: 10 ft (3.0 m)

Population (2020)
  - Total: 496
  - Density: 528.2/sq mi (203.92/km^{2})
- Time zone: UTC-5 (Eastern (EST))
  - Summer (DST): UTC-4 (EDT)
- ZIP code: 21628
- Area codes: 410 & 443
- GNIS feature ID: 597301

Crumpton is a census-designated place in Queen Anne's County, Maryland, United States. Crumpton is located along the Chester River, 5 miles (8.0 km) west-southwest of Millington. Crumpton has a post office with the ZIP code 21628.

Crumpton changed from an unincorporated community to a census-designated place for the 2020 Census.

Per the 2020 Census, the population was 496.

== Demographics ==
Historical population
Census	Pop.	Note	%±
2020	496		—
U.S. Decennial Census; 2020

Crumpton first appeared as a census designated place in the 2020 U.S. census.

=== 2020 census ===
Crumpton CDP, Maryland - Demographic Profile (NH = Non-Hispanic)
Race / Ethnicity	Pop 2020	% 2020
White alone (NH)	396	79.84%
Black or African American alone (NH)	23	4.64%
Native American or Alaska Native alone (NH)	2	0.40%
Asian alone (NH)	6	1.21%
Pacific Islander alone (NH)	0	0.00%
Some Other Race alone (NH)	4	0.81%
Mixed Race/Multi-Racial (NH)	20	4.03%
Hispanic or Latino (any race)	45	9.07%
Total	496	100.00%

Note: the US Census treats Hispanic/Latino as an ethnic category. This table excludes Latinos from the racial categories and assigns them to a separate category. Hispanics/Latinos can be of any race.
