= Sudlersville, Maryland =

- Town
- Flag Seal

- Location of Sudlersville, Maryland
- Coordinates: 39°11′11″N 75°51′29″W
- Country: United States
- State: Maryland
- County: Queen Anne's
- Incorporated: 1870

Area
  - Total: 1.52 sq mi (3.94 km^{2})
  - Land: 1.52 sq mi (3.94 km^{2})
  - Water: 0 sq mi (0.00 km^{2})
- Elevation: 69 ft (21 m)

Population (2020)
  - Total: 507
  - Density: 333.5/sq mi (128.78/km^{2})
- Time zone: UTC-5 (Eastern (EST))
  - Summer (DST): UTC-4 (EDT)
- ZIP code: 21668
- Area code: 410
- FIPS code: 24-75650
- GNIS feature ID: 0598128
- Website: www.townofsudlersville.org

Sudlersville is a town in the far northeastern corner of Queen Anne's County, Maryland, United States. The ZIP code is 21668 and the area code is 410. The population was 379 at the 2022 census. It is perhaps best known as the hometown of Baseball Hall of Famer Jimmie Foxx. Other famous residents include astronomer and mathematician Simon Newcomb.

== History ==
St. Andrew's Episcopal Chapel is listed on the National Register of Historic Places as is Dudley's Chapel just outside of town.

== Geography ==
Sudlersville is located at 39°11′11″N 75°51′29″W (39.186348, -75.858138).

According to the United States Census Bureau, the town has a total area of 0.94 square miles (2.43 km^{2}), all land.

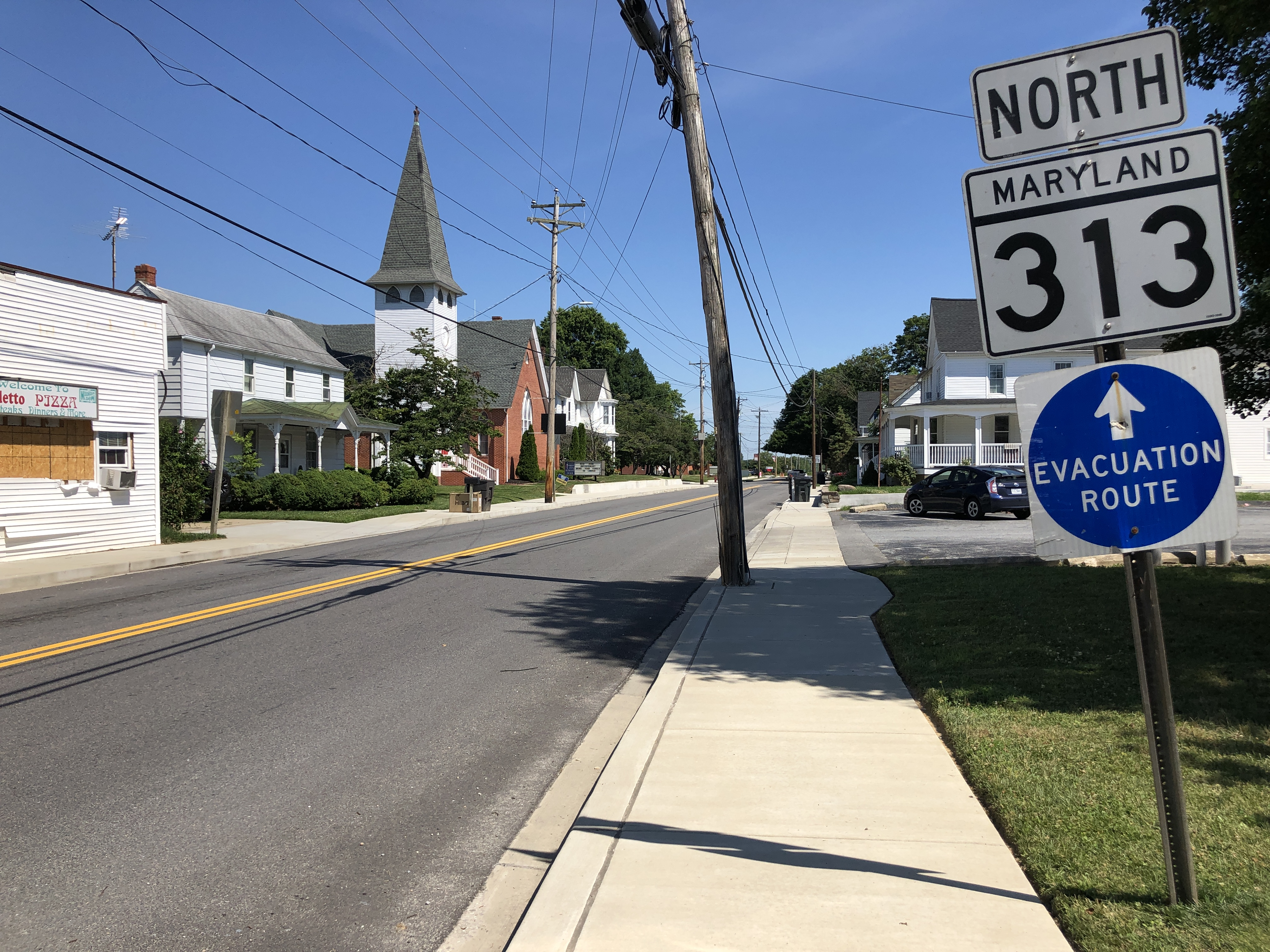
MD 313 northbound in Sudlersville

== Transportation ==
Roads are the primary means of travel to and from Sudlersville, and the town is served by three state highways. Maryland Route 313 is the primary north-south highway, while Maryland Route 300 is the main east-west highway. Maryland Route 837 serves as a short connector through the center of town, linking MD 300 and MD 313 and providing a truck bypass around the tight intersection in the center of town.

== Demographics ==
Historical population
Census	Pop.	Note	%±
1880	199		—
1890	125		−37.2%
1900	221		76.8%
1910	247		11.8%
1920	276		11.7%
1930	279		1.1%
1940	292		4.7%
1950	347		18.8%
1960	394		13.5%
1970	417		5.8%
1980	443		6.2%
1990	428		−3.4%
2000	391		−8.6%
2010	497		27.1%
2020	507		2.0%
U.S. Decennial Census

=== 2010 census ===
As of the census of 2010, there were 497 people, 211 households, and 119 families living in the town. The population density was 528.7 inhabitants per square mile (204.1/km^{2}). There were 244 housing units at an average density of 259.6 per square mile (100.2/km^{2}). The racial makeup of the town was 82.9% White, 6.8% African American, 0.2% Native American, 0.2% Asian, 4.8% from other races, and 5.0% from two or more races. Hispanic or Latino of any race were 7.4% of the population.

There were 211 households, of which 29.4% had children under the age of 18 living with them, 38.9% were married couples living together, 10.9% had a female householder with no husband present, 6.6% had a male householder with no wife present, and 43.6% were non-families. 36.5% of all households were made up of individuals, and 24.2% had someone living alone who was 65 years of age or older. The average household size was 2.31 and the average family size was 2.97.

The median age in the town was 40.8 years. 22.7% of residents were under the age of 18; 7.3% were between the ages of 18 and 24; 24.2% were from 25 to 44; 23.4% were from 45 to 64; and 21.9% were 65 years of age or older. The gender makeup of the town was 46.7% male and 53.3% female.

=== 2000 census ===
As of the census of 2000, there were 391 people, 167 households, and 106 families living in the town. The population density was 1,250.6 inhabitants per square mile (482.9/km^{2}). There were 178 housing units at an average density of 569.3 per square mile (219.8/km^{2}). The racial makeup of the town was 93.35% White, 4.60% African American, 0.26% Native American, 0.51% from other races, and 1.28% from two or more races. Hispanic or Latino of any race were 1.79% of the population.

There were 167 households, out of which 26.9% had children under the age of 18 living with them, 47.9% were married couples living together, 12.6% had a female householder with no husband present, and 36.5% were non-families. 32.9% of all households were made up of individuals, and 18.6% had someone living alone who was 65 years of age or older. The average household size was 2.31 and the average family size was 2.89.

In the town, the population was spread out, with 23.0% under the age of 18, 8.4% from 18 to 24, 27.1% from 25 to 44, 21.2% from 45 to 64, and 20.2% who were 65 years of age or older. The median age was 39 years. For every 100 females, there were 86.2 males. For every 100 females age 18 and over, there were 84.7 males.

The median income for a household in the town was $42,656, and the median income for a family was $50,208. Males had a median income of $32,159 versus $23,250 for females. The per capita income for the town was $19,528. About 6.0% of families and 4.4% of the population were below the poverty line, including none of those under age 18 and 13.2% of those age 65 or over.

== Notable person ==
- Jimmie Foxx, (1907–1967), nicknamed "Double X" and "The Beast", a Hall of Fame professional baseball player known as one of the best power hitters of all time, was born there.
