= Chester River =

Major tributary of the Chesapeake Bay

Coordinates: 39°2′1.87″N 76°11′43.21″W

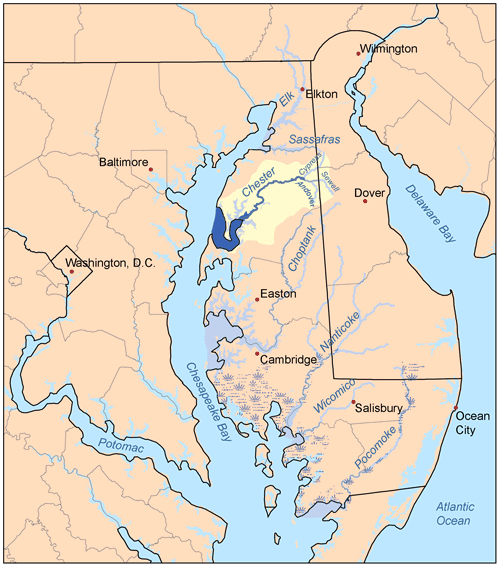
- Map of the rivers of the Eastern Shore of Maryland with the Chester and its watershed highlighted.

Location
- Country: United States
- State: Maryland
- District: Kent County, Maryland; Queen Anne's County, Maryland

Physical characteristics
- Source: Andover Branch / Cypress Branch
  - location: Millington, Maryland
  - elevation: 0 ft (0 m)
- Mouth: Chesapeake Bay
  - location: Love Point
  - elevation: 0 ft (0 m)

Basin features
- Tributaries
  - left: Red Lion Branch; Pearl Creek; Double Creek; Rosin Creek; Southeast Creek; White Cove; Corsica River; Reed Creek; Tilghman Creek; Queenstown Creek; Walsey Creek; Winchester Creek; Jackson Creek; Muddy Creek; Kent Narrows; Piney Creek
  - right: Prickly Pear Creek; Morgan Creek; Radcliffe Creek; Muddy Creek; Dam Creek; Broad Creek; Browns Creek; Jarrett Creek; Shippens Creek; Langford Creek; Grays Inn Creek; Church Creek

The Chester River is a major tributary of the Chesapeake Bay on the Delmarva Peninsula. It is about 43 miles (69 km) long, and its watershed encompasses 368 sq mi (950 km^{2}), which includes 295 sq mi (760 km^{2}) of land. Thus the total watershed area is 20% water. It forms the border between Kent County and Queen Anne's County, Maryland, with its headwaters extending into New Castle County and Kent County, Delaware. Chestertown, the seat of Maryland's Kent County, is located on its north shore. It is located south of the Sassafras River and north of Eastern Bay, and is connected with Eastern Bay through Kent Narrows.

The Chester River begins at Millington, Maryland, where Cypress Branch and Andover Branch join together. It ends at the Chesapeake Bay in a very wide mouth between Love Point on Kent Island, and Swan Point, near Gratitude, Maryland. Cypress Branch rises in southwestern New Castle County, Delaware, and Andover Branch, with its tributary, Sewell Branch, rises in northwestern Kent County, Delaware. Millington is the head of navigation. Sewell Branch and Andover Branch join in a private impoundage of approximately 30 acres (120,000 m^{2}) about two miles (3 km) above joining with Cypress Branch and then becoming the Chester River.

Its main tributaries are Langford Creek and Morgan Creek on the north side and the Corsica River and Southeast Creek on the south side. There are also several small creeks on the northern shore, including Church Creek, Grays Inn Creek, Shippen Creek, Jarrett Creek, Browns Creek, Broad Creek, Dam Creek, Radcliffe Creek, and Mills Branch. On the southern shore the small creeks include Queenstown Creek, Tilghman Creek, Reed Creek, Grove Creek, Hambleton Creek, Rosin Creek, Foreman Branch and Unicorn Branch.

== History ==
Local lore has it that in 1774, colonists boarded a British ship anchored in the Chester River at Chester Town, also called New Town on Chester, and threw its load of tea overboard, mimicking the Boston Tea Party and its act of defiance against King George III. This came to be known as the Chestertown Tea Party.

While primary source documents show that Chestertown residents did have at least one meeting to discuss the presence of tea aboard the locally owned merchantman Geddes, and later the residents sent food to aid the blockaded Bostonians, contemporaneous source material has yet to be found.
