= Millington, Maryland =

- Town
- Flag Seal

- Location of Millington, Maryland
- Coordinates: 39°15′34″N 75°50′19″W
- Country: United States
- State: Maryland
- Counties: Kent, Queen Anne's
- Incorporated: 1890

Area
  - Total: 0.74 sq mi (1.92 km^{2})
  - Land: 0.71 sq mi (1.85 km^{2})
  - Water: 0.023 sq mi (0.06 km^{2})
- Elevation: 20 ft (6 m)

Population (2020)
  - Total: 549
  - Density: 766.6/sq mi (295.98/km^{2})
- Time zone: UTC-5 (Eastern (EST))
  - Summer (DST): UTC-4 (EDT)
- ZIP code: 21651
- Area code: 410 443
- FIPS code: 24-52825
- GNIS feature ID: 0585893
- Website: millingtonmd.us

Millington is a town in Kent and Queen Anne's counties in the U.S. state of Maryland. As of the 2020 census, Millington had a population of 549. Millington is the head of navigation for the Chester River.

== History ==
The John Embert Farm was listed on the National Register of Historic Places in 1980.

== Geography ==
Millington is located at 39°15′34″N 75°50′19″W (39.259355, -75.838666).

According to the United States Census Bureau, the town has a total area of 0.69 square miles (1.79 km^{2}), of which 0.67 square miles (1.74 km^{2}) is land and 0.02 square miles (0.05 km^{2}) is water.

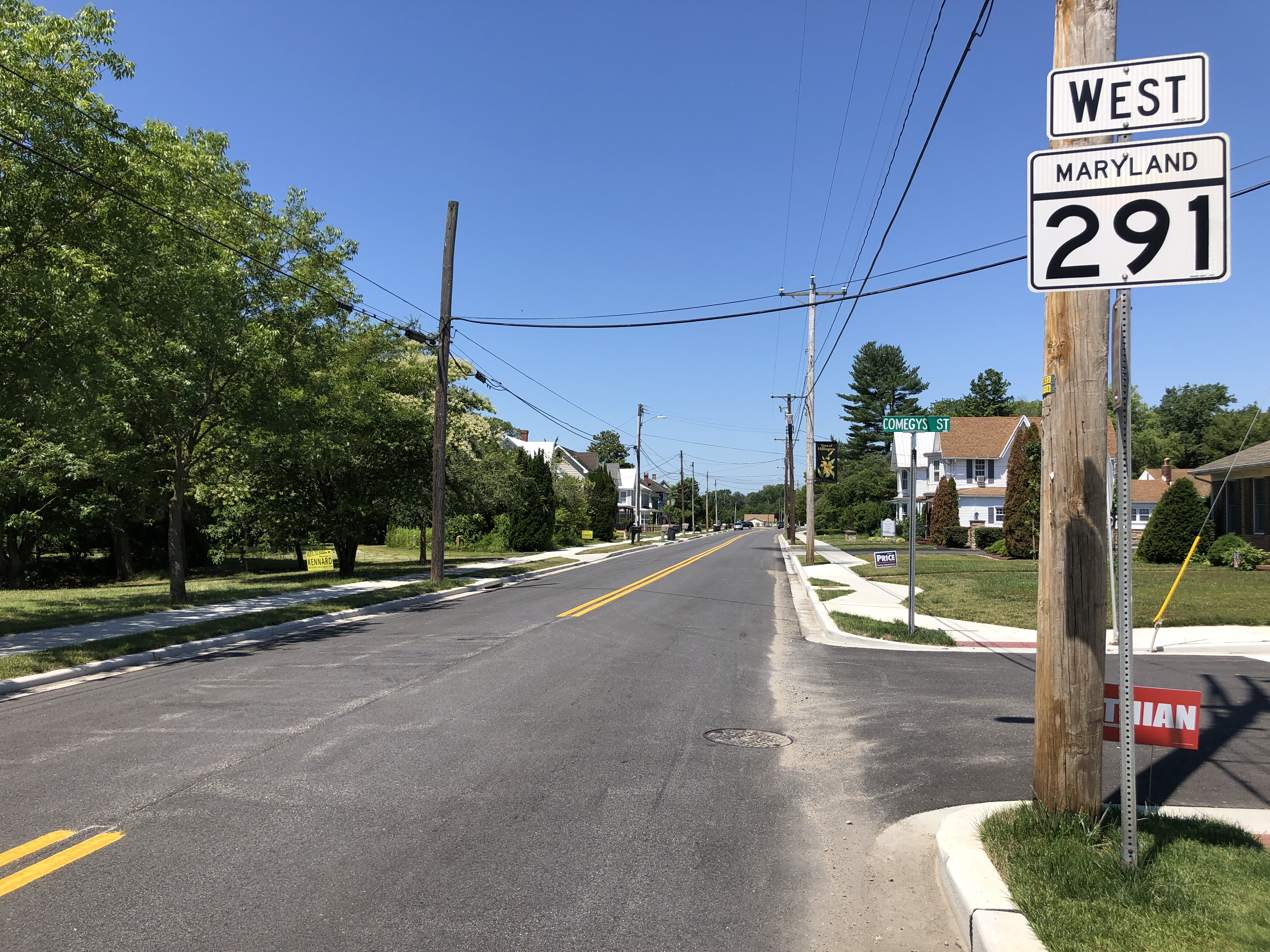
MD 291 westbound in Millington

== Transportation ==
The primary means of transportation to and from Millington is by road, and the town is served by two state highways. Maryland Route 291 traverses the town east–west, while Maryland Route 313 heads north and south from Millington. Both roads connect with U.S. Route 301 to the northwest, providing high-speed access to nearby metropolitan areas such as Philadelphia and Washington D.C.

== Climate ==
The climate in this area is characterized by hot, humid summers and generally mild to cool winters. According to the Köppen Climate Classification system, Millington has a humid subtropical climate, abbreviated "Cfa" on climate maps.

== Demographics ==
Historical population
Census	Pop.	Note	%±
1860	306		—
1870	420		37.3%
1880	444		5.7%
1890	485		9.2%
1900	406		−16.3%
1910	399		−1.7%
1920	368		−7.8%
1930	371		0.8%
1940	307		−17.3%
1950	356		16.0%
1960	408		14.6%
1970	474		16.2%
1980	546		15.2%
1990	409		−25.1%
2000	416		1.7%
2010	642		54.3%
2020	549		−14.5%
U.S. Decennial Census

=== 2010 census ===
As of the census of 2010, there were 642 people, 234 households, and 174 families living in the town. The population density was 958.2 inhabitants per square mile (370.0/km^{2}). There were 256 housing units at an average density of 382.1 per square mile (147.5/km^{2}). The racial makeup of the town was 72.0% White, 13.9% African American, 3.0% Asian, 9.3% from other races, and 1.9% from two or more races. Hispanic or Latino of any race were 13.9% of the population.

There were 234 households, of which 37.2% had children under the age of 18 living with them, 50.4% were married couples living together, 17.1% had a female householder with no husband present, 6.8% had a male householder with no wife present, and 25.6% were non-families. 17.1% of all households were made up of individuals, and 4.7% had someone living alone who was 65 years of age or older. The average household size was 2.74 and the average family size was 2.95.

The median age in the town was 36.2 years. 22.6% of residents were under the age of 18; 11.5% were between the ages of 18 and 24; 29.2% were from 25 to 44; 27.8% were from 45 to 64; and 9% were 65 years of age or older. The gender makeup of the town was 48.6% male and 51.4% female.

=== 2000 census ===
As of the census of 2000, there were 416 people, 163 households, and 106 families living in the town. The population density was 1,294.7 inhabitants per square mile (499.9/km^{2}). There were 173 housing units at an average density of 538.4 per square mile (207.9/km^{2}). The racial makeup of the town was 87.02% White, 6.49% African American, 4.33% from other races, and 2.16% from two or more races. Hispanic or Latino of any race were 7.69% of the population.

There were 163 households, out of which 31.9% had children under the age of 18 living with them, 49.7% were married couples living together, 9.8% had a female householder with no husband present, and 34.4% were non-families. 28.2% of all households were made up of individuals, and 13.5% had someone living alone who was 65 years of age or older. The average household size was 2.55 and the average family size was 3.07.

In the town, the population was spread out, with 26.0% under the age of 18, 7.2% from 18 to 24, 29.8% from 25 to 44, 21.4% from 45 to 64, and 15.6% who were 65 years of age or older. The median age was 37 years. For every 100 females, there were 91.7 males. For every 100 females age 18 and over, there were 100.0 males.

The median income for a household in the town was $45,893, and the median income for a family was $48,750. Males had a median income of $29,917 versus $28,500 for females. The per capita income for the town was $20,240. About 8.6% of families and 12.9% of the population were below the poverty line, including 23.1% of those under age 18 and none of those age 65 or over.

== Education ==
It is in the Kent County Public Schools. Kent County Middle School is in Chestertown, and Kent County High School is in an unincorporated area, in the Butlertown CDP with a Worton postal address.

In 2017 the school board voted to close Millington Elementary School. In 2019 there were discussions about possibly reopening Millington Elementary.
