= Cross Island Trail =

Rail trail in Maryland, United States

Coordinates: 38°58′51.83″N 76°17′37.2″W

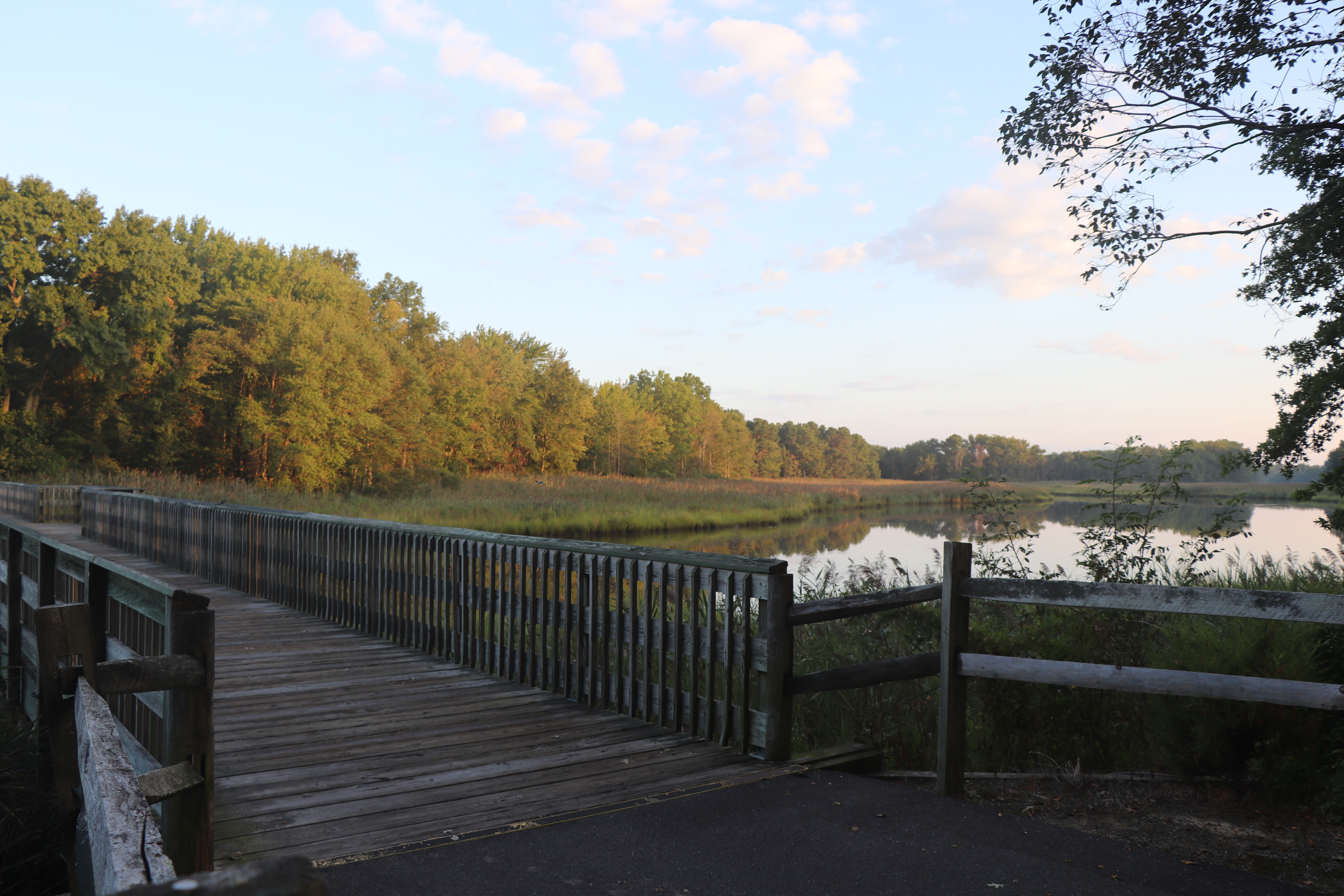
Cross Island Trail Bridge at Cox Creek

The Cross Island Trail is a rail trail in Queen Anne's County, Maryland occupying a section of the abandoned Queen Anne's Railroad corridor that traverses the width of Kent Island. It was completed in 2001 and is part of the American Discovery Trail.

== Route ==
The trail begins in Terrapin Park, near the foot of the Chesapeake Bay Bridge and traverses both Terrapin Park and the adjacent Chesapeake Bay Business Park. It then crosses Love Point Road through the property of Kent Island High School, then into Old Love Point Park. After traversing Old Love Point Park, the trail enters its original section and the former rail bed of the Queen Anne's Railroad. Along the railbed, it goes in a straight path until reaching the end of its original section at Castle Marina Road. After crossing the road, the trail mostly parallels Piney Creek Road and U.S. Route 50, before ending at the Chesapeake Exploration Center in Kent Narrows. A continuation of the trail utilizes the Kent Narrows Bridge on Maryland Route 18 and connects with the rest of the American Discovery Trail.
