= Maryland Route 18 =

State highway in Queen Anne's County, Maryland, US

Maryland Route 18
- Maryland Route 18 highlighted in red

Route information
- Maintained by MDSHA
- Length: 20.37 mi (32.78 km)
- Existed: 1927–present
- Tourist routes: Chesapeake Country Scenic Byway

Major junctions
- West end: Love Point
- MD 8 in Stevensville; MD 552 in Chester; US 50 / US 301 in Kent Narrows; US 50 in Queenstown; MD 656 in Queenstown; US 301 in Queenstown; MD 456 in Queenstown
- East end: MD 213 in Centreville

Location
- Country: United States
- State: Maryland
- Counties: Queen Anne's

Highway system
- Maryland highway system; Interstate; US; State; Scenic Byways
← MD 17	→ MD 19

Maryland Route 18 (MD 18) is a state highway in the U.S. state of Maryland. The state highway runs 20.37 miles (32.78 km) from the beginning of state maintenance at Love Point east to MD 213 in Centreville. MD 18 is the main east–west local highway on Kent Island and east to Centreville, serving the centers of Stevensville, Chester, Kent Narrows, Grasonville, and Queenstown that are bypassed by U.S. Route 50 (US 50)/US 301. What is signed as MD 18 is actually a set of four suffixed highways: MD 18A, MD 18B, MD 18S, and MD 18C. There are also several unsigned segments of MD 18 scattered along the length of the signed portions.

What is now MD 18 was first paved in the 1910s from Centreville to Queenstown along with short segments in Grasonville and Chester. Gaps in the Stevensville–Queenstown highway were filled throughout the 1920s, leaving only a crossing of Kent Narrows to be completed in the early 1930s. MD 18 between Stevensville and Love Point was constructed in the early 1930s. The Stevensville–Queenstown highway was designated part of MD 404, while the highways on both ends to Love Point and Centreville were designated MD 18. US 50 replaced MD 404 when the former highway was extended east of Annapolis in 1949. When US 50 was relocated as a divided highway between the Chesapeake Bay Bridge and Queenstown in the early 1950s, MD 18 was assigned to the bypassed highway. Since the mid-1980s, several suffixed sections of MD 18 have been created, relocated, or received new designations due to expansion of US 50/US 301 to a freeway.

== Route description ==
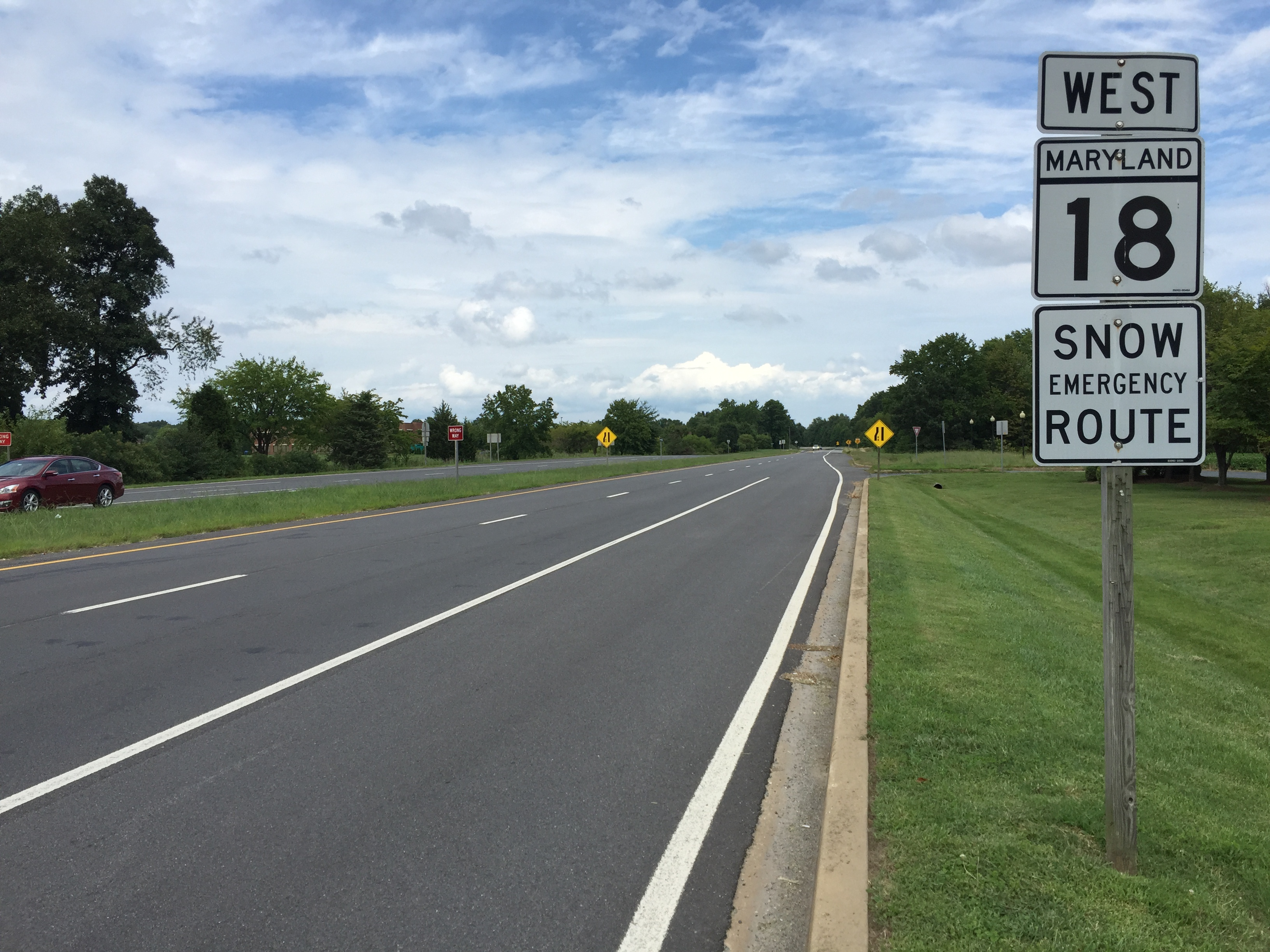
View west along MD 18A at MD 8 in Stevensville

The mainline of MD 18 consists of four internally suffixed sections. MD 18A runs 5.39 miles (8.67 km) from Love Point south and east through Stevensville to a roundabout at Castle Marina Road in Chester. MD 18B extends 7.94 miles (12.78 km) from the same roundabout east through Chester, Kent Narrows, and Grasonville to US 50 in Queenstown. MD 18S has a length of 0.33 miles (0.53 km) between US 50 and US 301 in Queenstown. MD 18C comprises the easternmost 6.71 miles (10.80 km) of the highway from US 301 in Queenstown to MD 213 in Centreville.

MD 18A's western terminus is at the beginning of state maintenance on Love Point Road just south of the community of Love Point at the northern end of Kent Island. The state highway heads due south as a two-lane undivided road through farmland. After meeting Old Love Point Road at an acute angle, MD 18A passes suburban subdivisions and Kent Island High School. Love Point Road, which is unsigned MD 835C, veers southeast to pass through the Stevensville Historic District, which contains the historic Cray House, the Stevensville Bank building, and Christ Church. MD 18A curves to the southwest as Business Parkway. The state highway expands to a four-lane divided highway ahead of the intersection with MD 8. MD 8 continues south on the divided highway toward an interchange with US 50/US 301 (Blue Star Memorial Highway) just east of the Chesapeake Bay Bridge while MD 18A turns east onto two-lane undivided Main Street. MD 18A curves around the southern edge of the Stevensville Historic District, intersecting Love Point Road, which is unsigned MD 759B to the south, and the other end of MD 835C (East Main Street). The state highway passes Stevensville Middle School, crosses Cox Creek, and passes the Kent Island Shopping Center before reaching its eastern terminus at a roundabout with Castle Marina Road, which is unsigned MD 18H to the south.

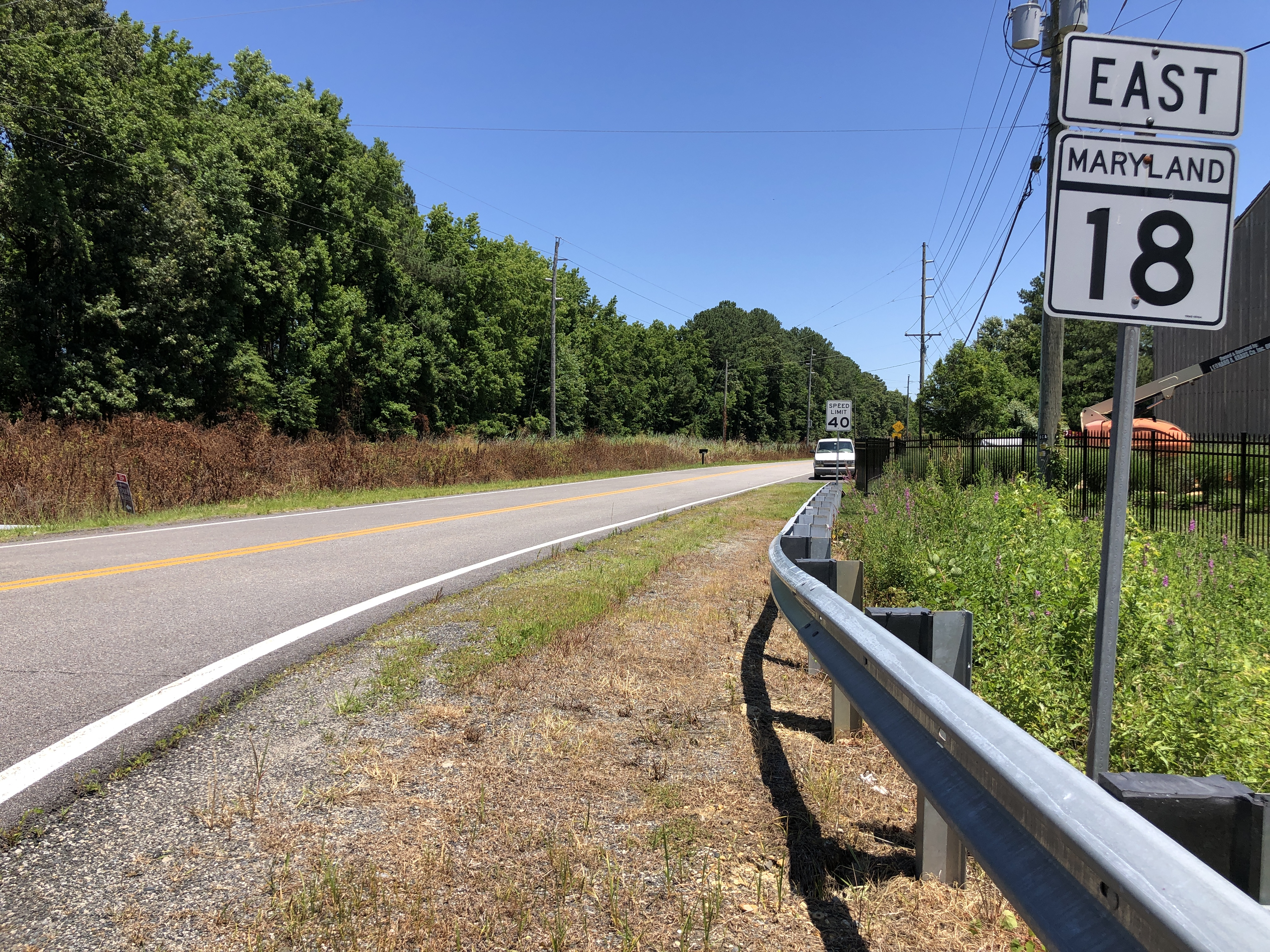
MD 18 eastbound past US 50 in Queenstown

MD 18B begins at the same roundabout at which MD 18A has its eastern terminus. Piney Creek Road, which is unsigned MD 18T, splits to the east as MD 18B curves southeast and crosses over US 50/US 301. The state highway curves east again at an intersection with its old alignment, Postal Road, in Chester shortly before an intersection with MD 552 (Dominion Road). MD 18B continues around the south end of Piney Creek before entering the hamlet of Kent Narrows, where the highway has a direct connection to eastbound US 50/US 301. The state highway also has an indirect connection to the westbound freeway via Piney Narrows Road, where it passes south of a park and ride lot under the freeway serving MTA Maryland commuter buses, immediately before crossing Kent Narrows on a drawbridge adjacent to the US 50/US 301 crossing of the strait. MD 18B continues east through Grasonville, where the highway intersects Chester River Beach Road (unsigned MD 18V) and Nesbit Road (unsigned MD 835K), both of which provide full access to the freeway. Past Nesbit Road, the road passes southeast of the University of Maryland Shore Emergency Center at Queenstown and the University of Maryland Shore Medical Pavilion at Queenstown. The state highway continues through farmland before reaching its eastern terminus at US 50 (Ocean Gateway) just east of the US 50 – US 301 split in Queenstown. The two highways meet at a superstreet intersection, so there is no direct access between MD 18B and MD 18S on the opposite side of the intersection.

MD 18S begins at US 50 opposite MD 18B's eastern terminus. At the intersection with MD 656 (Friels Road) and Outlet Center Drive, which heads into the Queenstown Premium Outlets, the state highway turns north and reaches its eastern terminus at a superstreet intersection with US 301 (Blue Star Memorial Highway). MD 18C begins at US 301 opposite the eastern terminus of MD 18S. The state highway heads northeast as Main Street through the town of Queenstown, where the highway intersects MD 456 (Del Rhodes Avenue) and passes near the historic home Bowlingly. After leaving the town, MD 18C's name changes to 4-H Park Road and the road passes through farmland. The state highway passes the namesake park of the youth agricultural organization shortly after crossing Reed Creek. MD 18C passes by the historic home Bachelor's Hope before the highway reaches its eastern terminus at MD 213 (Centreville Road) on the southwestern edge of Centreville.

== History ==
The first sections of MD 18 was paved as three separate state-aid roads within Queenstown and Grasonville by 1915, and between Stevensville and Chester shortly after 1915. The first section paved as a state road was between Centreville and Queenstown by 1919; there were also short pieces of state road paved in Chester and east of Grasonville by 1921. The state road in Chester was extended east to Kent Narrows and the state road near Grasonville was extended west through the village in 1923. The Stevensville–Chester road and the Queenstown–Centreville road were marked as MD 18 by 1927. The road from Stevensville to Love Point was started in 1929 and completed to just south of Love Point in 1930. The highway was extended to its present western terminus by 1933. Pavement was also laid from the west end of Grasonville to Kent Narrows by 1930. The east–west highway between Stevensville and Queenstown was finished with the completion of a timber trestle bascule bridge over Kent Narrows. That highway was marked as MD 404 in 1933; the highways from Stevensville to Love Point and from Queenstown to Centreville remained marked as MD 18.

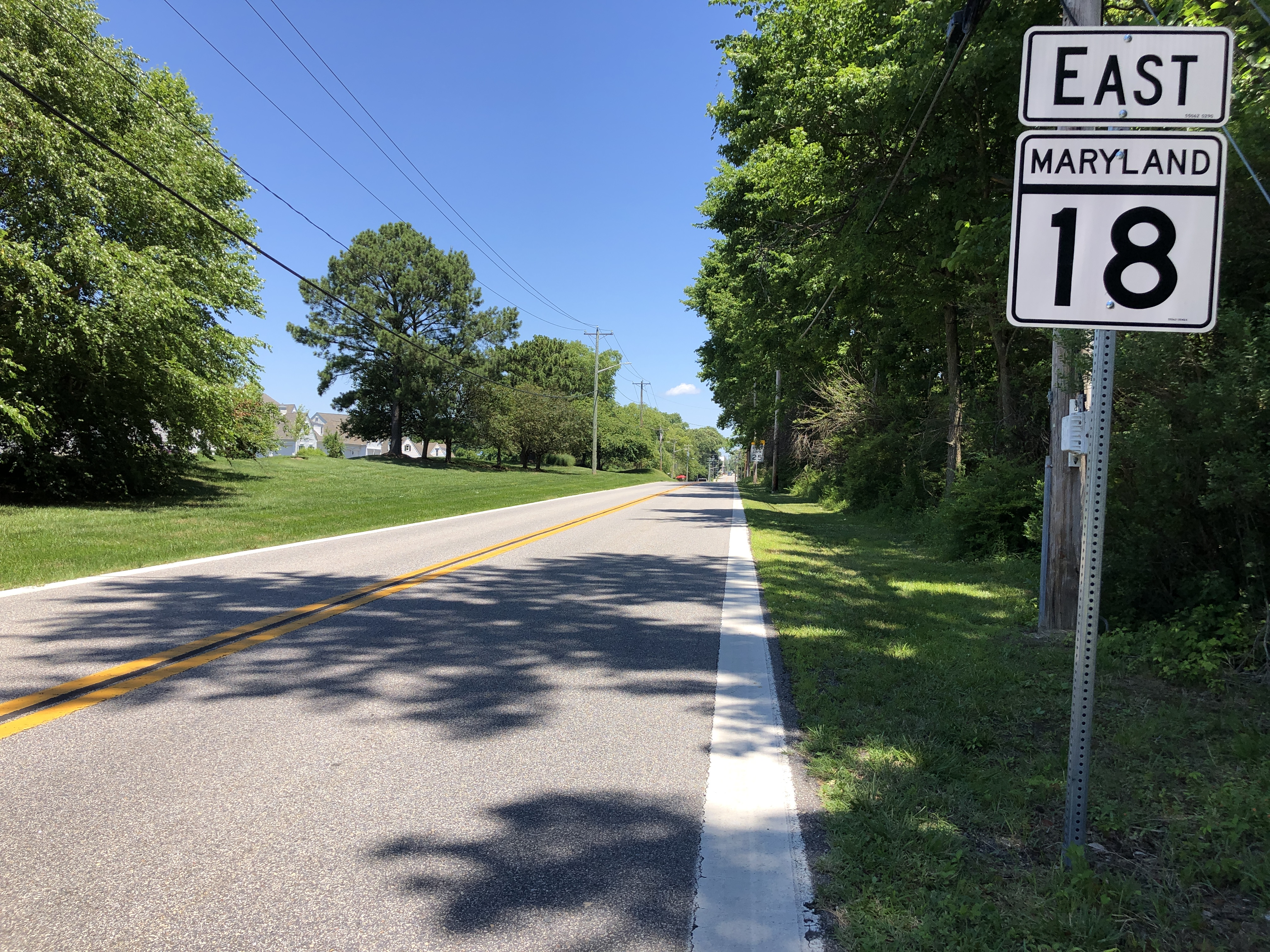
MD 18 eastbound past US 301 in Queenstown

When US 50 was extended to the Eastern Shore in 1949, it was routed along MD 404 to Wye Mills. The US 50 divided highway started construction in 1950 and was completed between the Chesapeake Bay Bridge and Queenstown in 1952, including a new drawbridge over Kent Narrows. The 1933 bridge over Kent Narrows was dismantled in 1953. MD 18 was subsequently assigned to old US 50 between Stevensville and Queenstown, following its own alignment except for a concurrency with US 50 and later US 301 over Kent Narrows.

Business Parkway was constructed in 1987 as a new alignment and northern extension of MD 8. MD 18 was extended west to Business Parkway and north on the divided highway to bypass the Stevensville Historic District in 1989; the old alignment was designated MD 835C. MD 18 also bypassed the center of Chester in 1989 by the construction of an overpass of US 50/US 301 just west of MD 552, replacing the intersection at Castle Marina Road. The latter improvement was part of the transformation of US 50/US 301 to a freeway from the Chesapeake Bay Bridge to Queenstown, which was completed in 1991. The upgrade included a new fixed high-level bridge over Kent Narrows for US 50/US 301, relegating the 1952 drawbridge to be used only by MD 18. In 1999, MD 18 was relocated to the north to use a new roundabout at Castle Marina Road in Chester; the old mainline was designated MD 18R. The MD 18 – US 301 junction in Queenstown was transformed into a superstreet intersection in 2003, resulting in the splitting of the MD 18C designation; MD 18S was assigned to the highway south of the junction.

As part of the reconstruction of US 50 as a six-lane freeway from US 301 in Queenstown to MD 404 in Wye Mills, the Maryland State Highway Administration plans to construct an overpass of MD 18 over US 50 in Queenstown. MD 18 and US 50 would become connected by a pair of right-in/right-out interchanges. Access to eastbound US 50 would be via a new service road south of US 50 and connections with westbound US 50 would be made through Outlet Center Drive. As of 2011, the project has not been funded.

== Junction list ==
The entire route is in Queen Anne's County.

Location	mi	km	Destinations	Notes
Love Point	0.00	0.00	Love Point Road north	Western terminus of MD 18A
Stevensville	3.01	4.84	Love Point Road south – Stevensville Historic District	Unsigned MD 835C
Stevensville	3.55	5.71	MD 8 south (Business Parkway) to US 50 / US 301 – Romancoke, Bay Bridge	Northern terminus of MD 8; MD 18A turns east onto Main Street
Stevensville	3.95	6.36	East Main Street west	Unsigned MD 835C
Chester	5.39	8.67	Castle Marina Road	Roundabout; Castle Marina Road south is unsigned MD 18H; eastern terminus of MD 18A; western terminus of MD 18B
Chester	5.50	8.85	Piney Creek Road east	Unsigned MD 18T
Chester	6.00	9.66	MD 552 (Dominion Road) to US 50 east / US 301 north – Dominion, Easton	
Kent Narrows	7.46	12.01	US 50 east / US 301 north (Blue Star Memorial Highway) – Easton	
Kent Narrows	7.72	12.42	Piney Narrows Road north to US 50 west / US 301 south – Bay Bridge	
Kent Narrows	7.97	12.83	Old Kent Narrows Bridge	
Grasonville	9.45	15.21	US 50 east / US 301 north (Blue Star Memorial Highway) – Easton	Unsigned MD 18F
Grasonville	10.00	16.09	Chester River Beach Road to US 50 / US 301 – Easton, Bay Bridge	Unsigned MD 18V
Grasonville	10.87	17.49	Nesbit Road to US 50 / US 301 – Easton, Bay Bridge	Unsigned MD 835K
Queenstown	13.33	21.45	US 50 (Ocean Gateway) – Ocean City, Bay Bridge	Right-in/right-out intersections between eastbound US 50 and MD 18B and westbound US 50 and MD 18S, plus a turn from westbound US 50 to MD 18B; no direct access between MD 18B and MD 18S; eastern terminus of MD 18B; western terminus of MD 18S
Queenstown	13.61	21.90	MD 656 east (Friels Road) / Outlet Center Drive south – Queenstown Premium Outlets	Western terminus of MD 656; MD 18S turns north
Queenstown	13.66	21.98	US 301 (Blue Star Memorial Highway) – Bay Bridge, Wilmington	Superstreet intersection; eastern terminus of MD 18S; western terminus of MD 18C
Queenstown	14.11	22.71	MD 456 south (Del Rhodes Avenue)	Northern terminus of MD 456; officially MD 456A
Centreville	20.37	32.78	MD 213 (Centreville Road) to US 301 – Church Hill, Wye Mills	Eastern terminus of MD 18C
1.000 mi = 1.609 km; 1.000 km = 0.621 mi: Incomplete access

== Auxiliary routes ==
MD 18 has 12 unsigned auxiliary routes. MD 18F, MD 18I, and MD 18U through MD 18Z are in Grasonville. MD 18G is in Queenstown. MD 18H, MD 18R, and MD 18T are in Chester.

- MD 18F is the designation for an unnamed 0.03-mile (0.048 km) connector between MD 18B and a right-in/right-out interchange (exit 43A) with eastbound US 50/US 301 between Kent Narrows and Grasonville.
- MD 18G is the designation for Links Lane, a 0.06-mile (0.097 km) section of old alignment of MD 18 just north of MD 18C's western terminus in Queenstown that serves as the entrance to Queenstown Harbor Golf Links.
- MD 18H is the designation for a 0.19-mile (0.31 km) section of Castle Marina Road between a right-in/right-out interchange (exit 39A) with westbound US 50/US 301 and the roundabout that serves as a terminus for both MD 18A and MD 18B in Chester.
- MD 18I is the designation for a 0.04-mile (0.064 km) segment of Station Lane that connects with a right-in/right-out interchange (exit 44A) with eastbound US 50/US 301.
- MD 18R is the designation for a former alignment of MD 18A/Main Street, a 0.32-mile (0.51 km) highway between MD 18A and MD 18H that serves a park and ride facility and other businesses in Chester.
- MD 18T is the designation for a 0.38 mi (0.61 km) stretch of Piney Creek Road between MD 18B and MD 552A (Chester Station Road) in Chester.
- MD 18U is the designation for a 0.02-mile (0.032 km) section of Jackson Creek Road that serves as the ramps of the right-in/right-out interchange (exit 43A) between the intersection of Jackson Creek Road, Saddler Road (unsigned MD 835B), and Long Point Road and westbound US 50/US 301 in Grasonville.
- MD 18V is the designation for a 0.65-mile (1.05 km) section of Chester River Beach Road between MD 18B and a point just north of Loblolly Way in Grasonville. MD 18V features a partial interchange with US 50/US 301 (exit 43B).
- MD 18W is the designation for VFW Avenue, a 0.33-mile (0.53 km) road between a right-in/right-out interchange (exit 44A) with westbound US 50/US 301 and MD 18V in Grasonville. The highway is state-maintained at both ends, with the middle stretch maintained by Queen Anne's County.
- MD 18X is the designation for a 0.07-mile (0.11 km) segment of Hess Road between MD 18Y and a right-in/right-out interchange (exit 45A) with eastbound US 50/US 301 in Grasonville.
- MD 18Y is the designation for Hess Frontage Road, a 0.11-mile (0.18 km) spur that parallels the eastbound side of US 50/US 301 east of MD 18X in Grasonville.
- MD 18Z is the designation for a 0.03-mile (0.048 km) portion of Evans Avenue adjacent to a right-in/right-out interchange (exit 44B) with eastbound US 50/US 301 in Grasonville.
