= U.S. Route 301 in Maryland =

Highway in Maryland

U.S. Route 301
- US 301 highlighted in red

Route information
- Auxiliary route of US 1
- Maintained by MDSHA and MDTA
- Length: 122.85 mi (197.71 km)
- Existed: 1940–present
- Tourist routes: Religious Freedom Byway; Booth's Escape Scenic Byway; Star-Spangled Banner Scenic Byway

Major junctions
- South end: US 301 at the Virginia state line
- MD 6 in La Plata; MD 5 in Brandywine; MD 4 in Upper Marlboro; US 50 / MD 3 in Bowie; I-97 in Annapolis; MD 2 in Annapolis; US 50 near Queenstown; MD 213 near Centreville; MD 300 near Dudley Corners; MD 313 near Galena
- North end: US 301 Toll at the Delaware state line

Location
- Country: United States
- State: Maryland
- Counties: Charles, Prince George's, Anne Arundel, Queen Anne's, Kent, Cecil

Highway system
- United States Numbered Highway System; List; Special; Divided; Maryland highway system; Interstate; US; State; Scenic Byways
← MD 300	→ MD 302

U.S. Route 301 (US 301) in the state of Maryland is a major highway that runs 122.85 miles (197.71 km) from the Governor Harry W. Nice Memorial Bridge over the Potomac River into Virginia northeast to Delaware. It passes through three of Maryland's four main regions: Southern Maryland, the Baltimore-Washington Metropolitan Area, and the Eastern Shore. US 301 serves mainly as a bypass of Baltimore and Washington, D.C. from Virginia to Delaware.

== Route description ==
US 301 is a Blue Star Memorial Highway for its entire length in Maryland. The Federated Garden Clubs of Maryland declared the U.S. Highway a Blue Star Memorial Highway as a tribute to the United States Armed Forces in 1948, and a 1953 resolution signed by Governor William Preston Lane, Jr., officially dedicated US 301 as such. The highway's primary name from the Potomac River to Bowie is Robert Crain Highway. Robert Crain was a Charles County farmer and lawyer who spearheaded the construction of a new highway to directly connect Baltimore and Southern Maryland that was completed in 1927. Along its concurrency with US 50 and unsigned I-595 from Bowie to the Severn River, US 301 follows John Hanson Highway. The freeway is named for John Hanson, the first President of the Continental Congress in 1781.

Short portions of US 301 are included among several Maryland Scenic Byways. US 301 is part of the Religious Freedom Byway, from Maryland Route 257 (MD 257) to MD 234 near Newburg and from Popes Creek Road at Faulkner to Chapel Point Road at Bel Alton in southern Charles County. That byway is also a National Scenic Byway, the Religious Freedom Byway. US 301 is included in the Booth's Escape Scenic Byway from the Potomac River to Edge Hill Road in Newburg, from Popes Creek Road at Faulkner to Bel Alton Newtown Road at Bel Alton, and along its concurrency with MD 5 from Waldorf to Brandywine. The U.S. Highway is part of the Star-Spangled Banner Scenic Byway from MD 382 at Marlton to MD 725 in Upper Marlboro.

US 301 is almost entirely maintained by the Maryland State Highway Administration. The exceptions include the Governor Harry W. Nice Bridge across the Potomac River and the Chesapeake Bay Bridge across the Chesapeake Bay and the respective bridges' approach roads and toll plazas, which are maintained by the Maryland Transportation Authority. US 301 is a part of the National Highway System for its entire length.

=== Newburg to Bowie ===
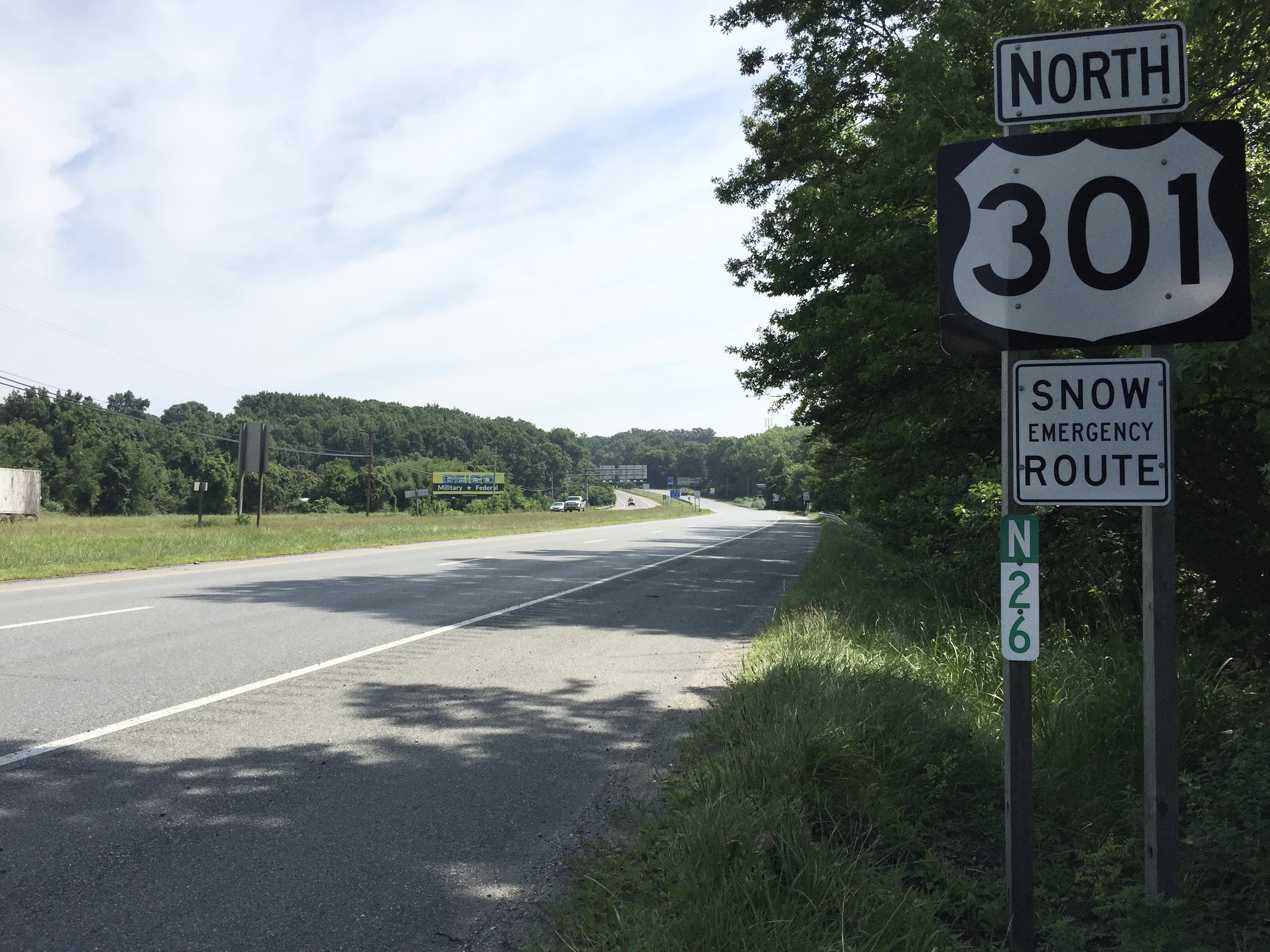
View north along US 301 just after crossing the Nice Bridge

US 301 enters Maryland at the Virginia state line on the right bank of the Potomac River near Dahlgren in King George County, Virginia, from which the U.S. Highway continues toward Bowling Green and Richmond. The highway crosses the Potomac River on the Governor Harry W. Nice Memorial Bridge, a four-lane divided bridge. US 301 becomes a four-lane divided highway named Robert Crain Highway just east of the southbound-only all-electronic toll gantry for the bridge and to the north of the Morgantown Generating Station. The highway parallels CSX's Popes Creek Subdivision rail line on a sweeping curve from east to north through the community of Newburg. US 301 passes a welcome center and has a directional crossover intersection with MD 257 (Rock Point Road). The highway curves northwest at its directional crossover intersection with MD 234 (Budds Creek Road) at the hamlet of Glasva, then curves north again between Faulkner and Bel Alton, from which Chapel Point Road leads west to Chapel Point State Park.

US 301 passes through the hamlet of Spring Hill shortly before it enters the town of La Plata, the county seat of Charles County. The highway passes to the west of the center of town and intersects MD 6, which heads east as Charles Street and west as Port Tobacco Road, and MD 225 (Hawthorne Road). US 301 leaves La Plata at Rosewick Road and gradually curves northeast toward White Plains. There, the highway meets the eastern end of MD 227 (Marshall Corner Road), passes near the eastern end of the Indian Head Rail Trail, and intersects Billingsley Road, which leads to the southern end of MD 925 (Old Washington Road). US 301 expands to six lanes near Smallwood Drive, where it passes south of a park and ride lot serving MTA Maryland commuter buses. The highway runs through the planned community of St. Charles, which contains the St. Charles Towne Center shopping mall. The highway continues through the unincorporated town of Waldorf, where the highway meets the eastern end of MD 228 (Berry Road) and the northern end of MD 5 Business (Leonardtown Road).

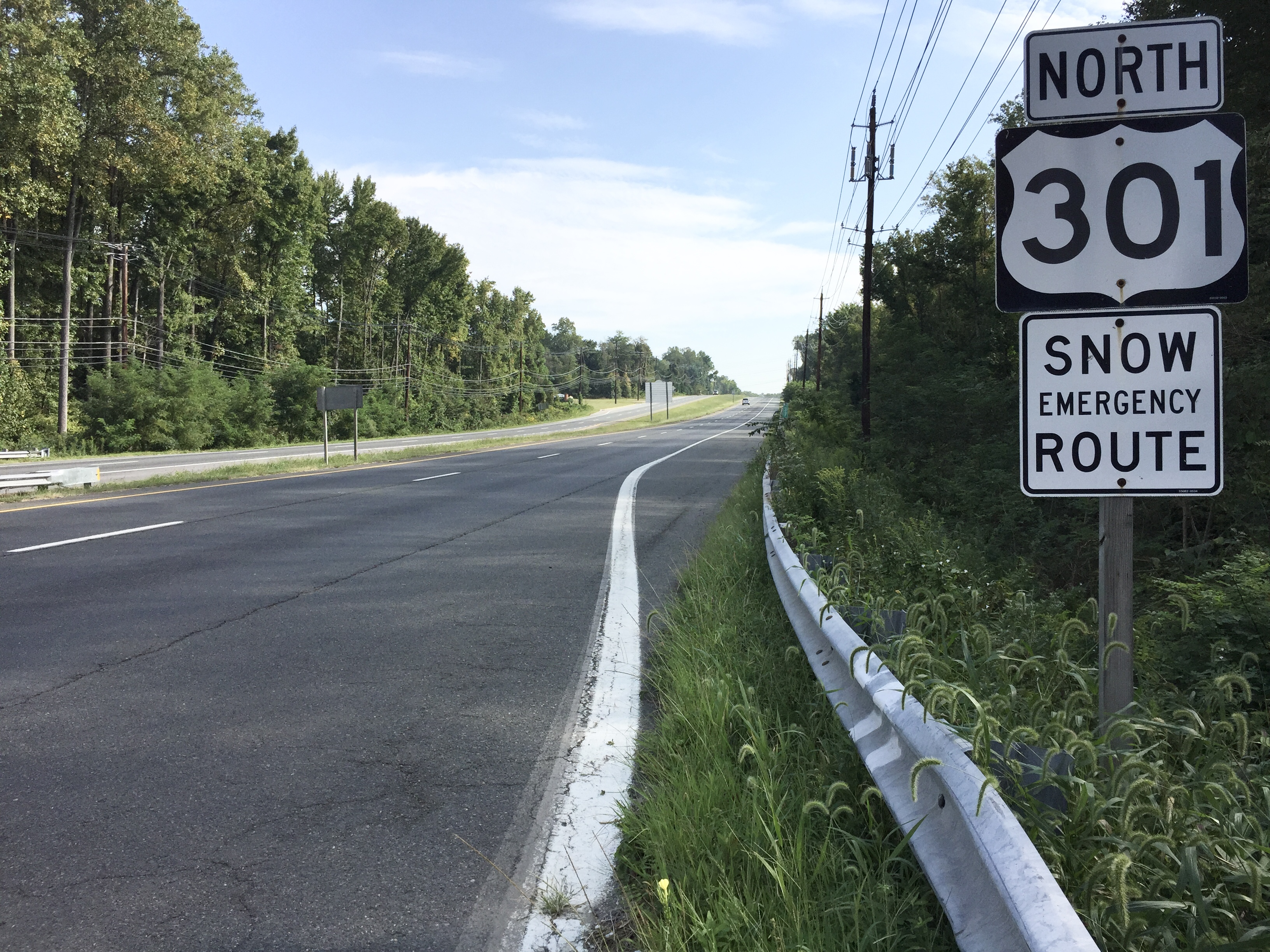
US 301 northbound past MD 382 in Croom

At the north end of Waldorf, US 301 has a partial intersection with MD 5 (Mattawoman Beantown Road); access from northbound MD 5 to southbound US 301 is via Mattawoman Drive. The two highways curve north and cross Mattawoman Creek into Prince George's County. The highway temporarily gains extra lanes while passing through the area north of the county line, during which the highways cross Timothy Branch. US 301 and MD 5 diverge at a partial interchange in Brandywine, from which MD 5 continues north along Branch Avenue toward Washington and US 301 drops to four lanes. US 301 curves northeast and intersects Brandywine Road, which heads east through the center of Brandywine as MD 381. Brandywine Road to the west provides access from southbound US 301 to northbound MD 5 and from southbound MD 5 to northbound US 301. US 301 heads through the communities of Cheltenham and Rosaryville, where the highway passes along the east side of Rosaryville State Park. The highway continues through Marlton, where it crosses Charles Branch and meets the northern end of MD 382 (Croom Road).

Old Crain Highway splits north from US 301 as the highway approaches Upper Marlboro, the county seat of Prince George's County. The U.S. Highway curves north and crosses CSX's Popes Creek Subdivision rail line at-grade and heads across the Western Branch of the Patuxent River south of its cloverleaf interchange with MD 4 (Stephanie Roper Highway). US 301 meets the eastern end of MD 725 (Marlboro Pike) east of Upper Marlboro. The highway continues north, passing a pair of weigh stations, and gains a wide median at the southern edge of the city of Bowie. There, the U.S. Highway intersects Old Central Avenue, which is part of MD 978, and has a six-ramp interchange with MD 214 (Central Avenue). The movements from northbound US 301 to eastbound MD 214 and from eastbound MD 214 to southbound US 301 are made via Old Central Avenue (unsigned MD 978B). US 301 follows the eastern city limit of Bowie and expands to six lanes south of its intersection with MD 197 (Collington Road). Past this junction, the road intersects Ball Park Road, which leads east to Prince George's Stadium, the home ballpark of the Bowie Baysox baseball team. The U.S. Highway briefly fully enters the city of Bowie just south of its cloverleaf interchange with US 50 (John Hanson Highway) and MD 3, which heads north along Robert Crain Highway while US 301 heads east concurrent with US 50 and unsigned I-595.

=== Bowie to Queenstown ===
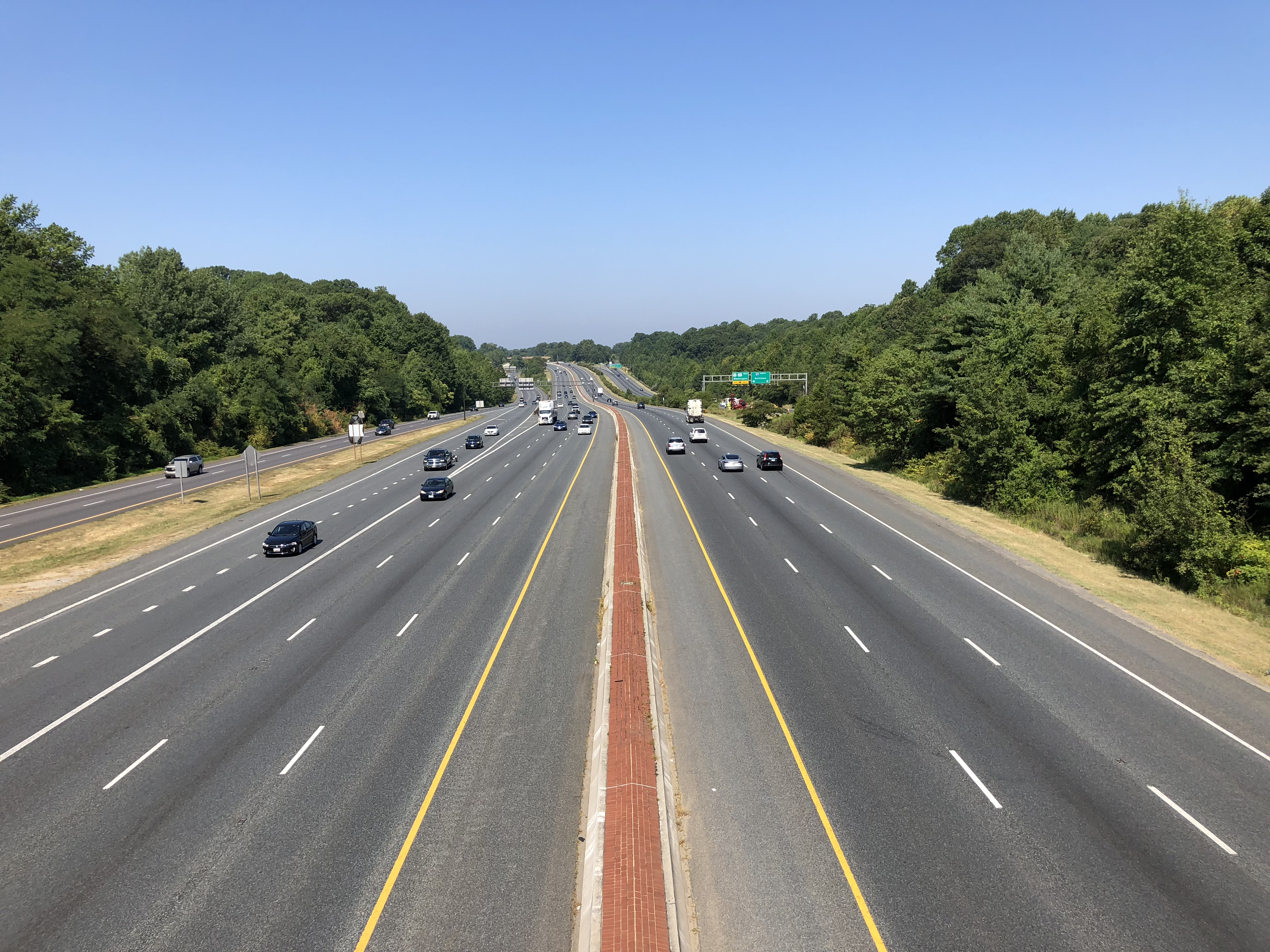
US 50 westbound/US 301 southbound at the MD 665 exit in Parole

US 301 and US 50 head east along John Hanson Highway, a six-lane freeway, across the Patuxent River into Anne Arundel County. The highways have junctions with MD 424 north of Davidsonville and the southern end of I-97 in Parole. US 301 and US 50 pass to the north of Annapolis, which is accessed by interchanges with MD 665, MD 450, MD 2, and MD 70. The I-595 designation ends at the MD 70 interchange. MD 2 joins the U.S. Highways along the freeway to cross the Severn River. MD 2 splits north from the U.S. Highways at a common interchange with the eastern end of MD 450, where the freeway's name changes to Blue Star Memorial Highway. US 301 and US 50 meet MD 179 near Cape St. Claire and pass by Sandy Point State Park right before the highways use the dual-span Chesapeake Bay Bridge to cross the Chesapeake Bay. US 301 and US 50 meet MD 8 on Kent Island in Queen Anne's County. The six-lane freeway parallels MD 18 and has numerous right-in/right-out interchange with local roads as it passes through Stevensville and Chester. US 301 and US 50 parallel MD 18 across the Kent Narrows onto the mainland of the Delmarva Peninsula, then the freeway continues through more right-in/right-out interchanges in Grasonville before the U.S. Highways diverge at Queenstown.

=== Queenstown to Warwick ===
US 301 reduces to a four-lane non-freeway divided highway with a speed limit of 55 miles per hour (89 km/h) at its partial interchange with US 50 (Ocean Gateway). The highway passes along the edge of the town of Queenstown, where the highway meets MD 18 (Main Street) and MD 456 (Del Rhodes Avenue) at a pair of superstreet intersections. Access from southbound US 301 to eastbound US 50 and from westbound US 50 to northbound US 301 is via MD 18 at the Queenstown Premium Outlets. US 301 gradually curves northeast as it passes to the south and east of Centreville, the county seat of Queen Anne's County. The highway has a five-ramp partial cloverleaf interchange with MD 213 (Centreville Road) south of town and a double-roundabout partial cloverleaf interchange with MD 304 (Ruthsburg Road) north of Mill Stream Branch. US 301 has an oblique at-grade crossing of the Centerville Branch of the Northern Line of the Maryland and Delaware Railroad. The highway parallels the railroad through an intersection with MD 305 (Hope Road) at Carville and unsigned MD 834 (Hayden Clark Road), where the median temporarily widens for the Bay Country Welcome Center.

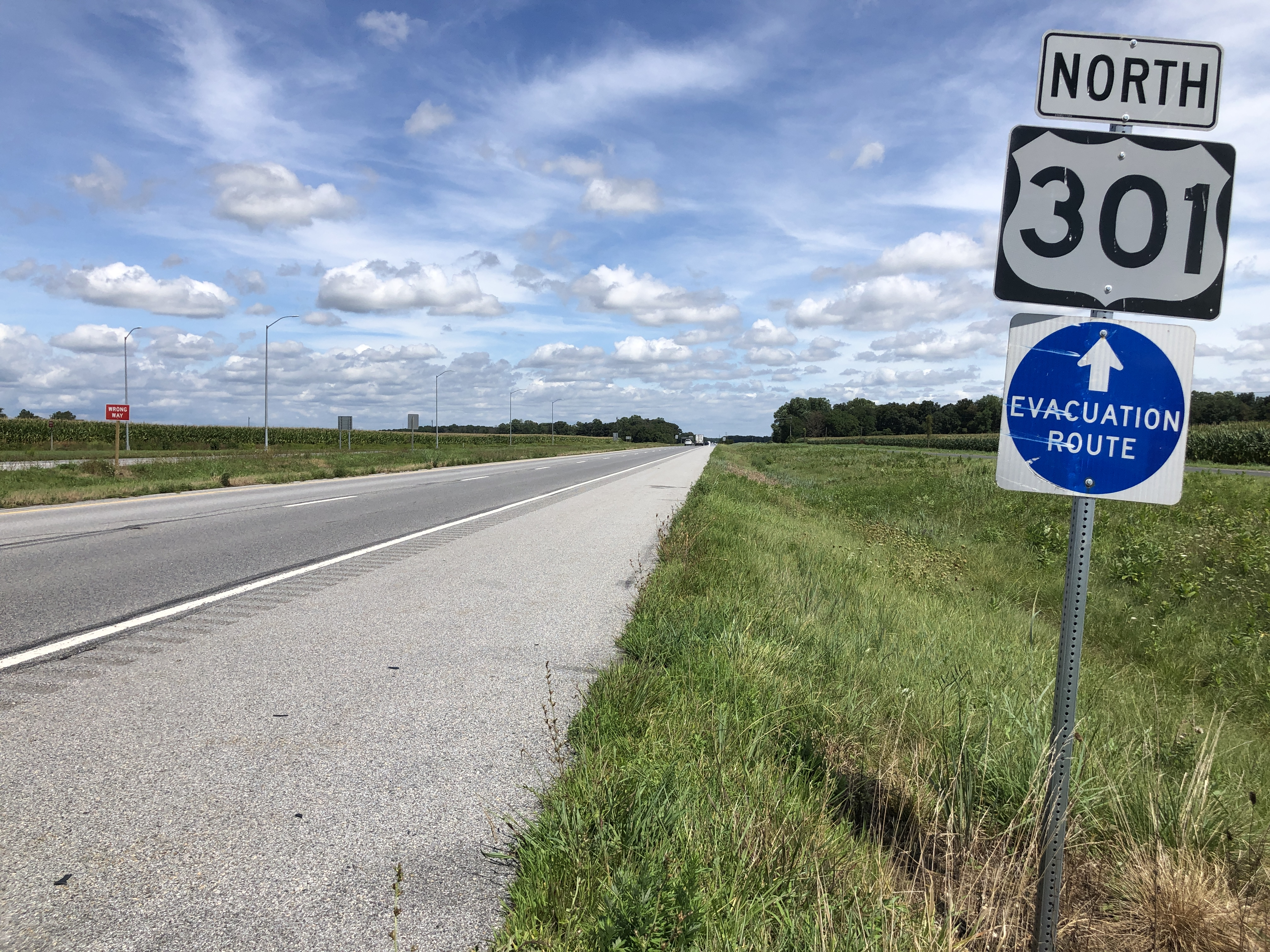
US 301 northbound past the MD 299 intersection in Cecil County

US 301 diverges from the railroad at its intersection with MD 405 (Price Station Road) at Price. The U.S. highway continues north through junctions with MD 19 (Roberts Station Road) and the western end of MD 302 (Barclay Road) and a superstreet intersection with MD 300 (Sudlersville Road). US 301 has a four-ramp partial cloverleaf interchange with MD 290 (Dudley Corner Road) just south of Red Lion Branch. The U.S. Highway has a superstreet intersection with MD 544 (McGinnes Road) just west of that highway's eastern end at MD 313 and just south of Unicorn Branch. US 301 crosses the Chester River into Kent County west of Millington. The highway continues through an indirect interchange with MD 291 (River Road); access to MD 291 is via side ramps with two unsigned portions of MD 701, which parallels the northbound and southbound sides of US 301 as Howard Johnson Road and Edge Road, respectively.

US 301 has an at-grade railroad crossing with the Chestertown Branch of the Northern Line of the Maryland and Delaware Railroad west of the junction of the two Northern Line branches at Massey. North of the railroad, the U.S. highway has a superstreet intersection with MD 313 (Galena Road) south of Galena. US 301 has a diamond interchange with MD 290 (Galena Sassafras Road) before crossing the Sassafras River into Cecil County west of Sassafras. The highway meets the northern end of MD 299 (Massey Sassafras Road), where there is a weigh station in the southbound direction, and passes to the south of Warwick. US 301 reaches the Maryland–Delaware state line, where it continues northeast into New Castle County along an all-electronic toll freeway.

== History ==
In 1940, the completion of the Potomac River Bridge heralded the entry of US 301 into Maryland. A short connector between the northern end of the bridge and MD 3 resulted in the majority of the latter route being taken designated as US 301, with only a small portion remaining signed as MD 3 (this portion is now MD 257).

The road was designated as a Blue Star Highway in 1948.

Originally, the route went all the way along former MD 3 into Baltimore and ended near present-day MD 295 (Russell Street). As US 301, it was upgraded into a four-and-six-lane divided highway throughout in the 1940s and early 1950s.

Maryland Route 71
- Location: Queenstown–Warwick
- Existed: 1956–1959

In 1959, the route was rerouted along US 50 to the Eastern Shore where it split from US 50 and was routed from there up former Maryland Route 71 into Delaware.

The adjacent span of the Chesapeake Bay Bridge was opened in 1973.

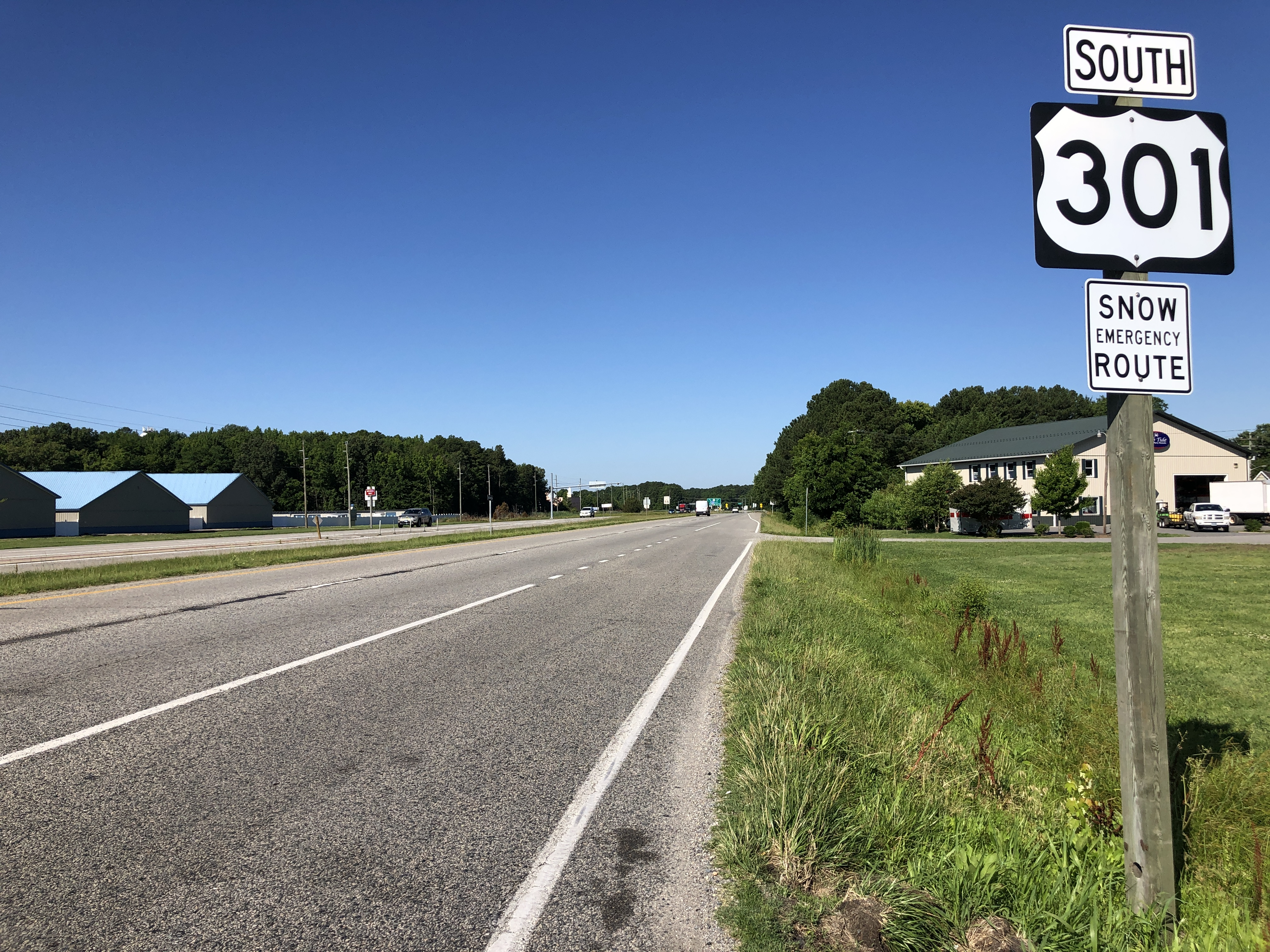
US 301 southbound past MD 456 in Queenstown

By the late 1980s, the segment of the highway between the Chesapeake Bay Bridge and the US 50/US 301 split in Queenstown still a four-lane at-grade divided expressway, was extremely congested. Because of this, the route was upgraded into a six-lane grade-separated limited-access expressway, with most of the intersections converted into right-in/right-out interchanges, and a few others being converted into more standard interchanges. The US 50/US 301 concurrency on the Eastern Shore included a four-lane drawspan connecting Kent Island to the mainland; the upgrade from four to six lanes included rerouting US 50/US 301 onto a high-level fixed span just north of there, with the drawspan now being used for MD 18. Further north, where US 301 is running by itself as four-lane limited access, it reached MD 213 at a traffic signal which was the last full traffic signal on northbound US 301 in Maryland, but that signal was then replaced by the current interchange. The upgrade of the route was completed by 1990.

In May 1991, southbound only tolling began at the Harry Nice Bridge.

In 1994, the intersection with MD 213 was completed.

From 2004 to 2008, a southbound weigh station was built at the intersection with Sassafras Road. In addition, the intersections with MD 344 and MD 300 were altered to use J-turns.

The Maryland Department of Transportation built a dumbbell interchange to replace the superstreet intersection with MD 304. The interchange project constructed a bridge carrying MD 304 over US 301. This interchange was the top transportation priority for Queen Anne's County for years and was pushed for by students at Queen Anne's County High School after a student at the school was killed in an accident at the intersection in 2010. A groundbreaking ceremony was held on September 23, 2014, with several Queen Anne's County commissioners and representatives from state government in attendance. The interchange opened to traffic on August 15, 2017.

The Pearl Harbor Memorial bridge was expanded to seven lanes, four eastbound and three westbound, from the fall 2017 to the spring of 2018. The expansion narrowed each of the lanes from 12 to 11 feet, and the shoulders from three feet to one foot. The renovation was completed after eight months of work and the improved layout was implemented in time for Memorial Day of 2018, helping to reduce congestion during peak eastbound travel times.

On January 10, 2019, US 301 in Delaware was shifted to a tollway linking the divided US 301 in Maryland with Delaware Route 1, providing a multi-lane alternative to I-95 between northern Delaware and Washington, D.C. As a result, US 301 was realigned and rebuilt into a four-lane roadway as it reached the Delaware state line.

The Maryland Transportation Authority has been studying the twinning or replacement of the Harry W. Nice Memorial Bridge over the Potomac River since about 2006, and identified a preferred alternative which involved replacing the two-lane span with a new bridge with four lanes, shoulders and a new two-way bike and pedestrian trail. On November 21, 2016, the Maryland Transportation Authority Board voted unanimously to build a new four-lane bridge just north of the current structure. Construction began in June 2020. A ribbon-cutting ceremony for the new bridge was held on October 12, 2022, with Governor Larry Hogan in attendance, while the bridge opened to traffic the following day.

On June 27, 2023, the eastbound exit and entrance at exit 31 was permanently closed to improve safety at the intersection of Whitehall Road and Skidmore Drive.

Between September 16, 2023, and October 1, 2023, a pilot project took place in which the westbound entrances at MD 8, Duke Street, and Shopping Center Road on Kent Island were closed from 10 a.m. to 8 p.m. on Saturday and Sunday in order to keep through traffic approaching the Chesapeake Bay Bridge on US 50 and reduce traffic along MD 18. The westbound ramp closures on Kent Island will return in 2024 on weekends and Monday holidays from May 18 to September 2.

=== Future ===
A group known as the Eastern Shoreway Alliance is seeking to have US 301 from Queenstown to the Delaware line redesignated as the Eastern Shoreway, similar to the Ocean Gateway designation of US 50 to the south.

In December 2004, plans were announced on a project to potentially replace the Chesapeake Bay Bridge with a new six lane span. The task force concluded that a bridge would be the best option for an additional crossing, and four geographic locations for such a bridge were explored: Anne Arundel County to Queen Anne's County (the existing location), Baltimore County to Kent County, Anne Arundel or Calvert County to Talbot County, and Calvert County to Dorchester County. In late 2006, the task force released a report on the study but did not make a final recommendation; members of the task force requested additional time to continue the study. In 2020, it was announced that 11 of 14 potential sites for a third span had been rejected by the Maryland Transportation Authority following a $5 million study into the impacts of an additional span. Significant environmental and economic impacts were identified, with a report stating that any additional crossing is "expected to be multiple billions of dollars."

== Junction list ==
County	Location	mi	km	Exit	Destinations	Notes
Potomac River		0.00	0.00		US 301 south (James Madison Parkway) – Richmond	Continuation into Virginia
Potomac River		0.00– 1.90	0.00– 3.06	Governor Harry W. Nice Memorial Bridge (southbound toll; E-ZPass or pay-by-plate)		
Charles	Newburg	3.81	6.13		MD 257 south (Rock Point Road) – Newburg, Swan Point, Cobb Island	Directional crossover intersection
Charles	Allens Fresh	5.76	9.27		MD 234 east (Budds Creek Road) – Leonardtown, Lexington Park, Patuxent NAS	Directional crossover intersection
Charles	La Plata	14.81	23.83		MD 6 (Charles Street/Port Tobacco Road) – Port Tobacco, Nanjemoy, Downtown La Plata	
Charles	La Plata	15.54	25.01		MD 225 west (Hawthorne Road) – Indian Head	
Charles	White Plains	19.55	31.46		MD 227 west (Marshall Corner Road) – Pomfret, Pomonkey, Bryans Road	
Charles	White Plains	20.77	33.43		Billingsley Road	Billingsley Road east is MD 925A
Charles	Waldorf	23.31	37.51		MD 228 west (Berry Road) / MD 5 Bus. south (Leonardtown Road) – Berry, Hughesville, Lexington Park	
Charles	Waldorf	26.04	41.91		Mattawoman Drive	Mattawoman Drive is MD 5K
Charles	Waldorf	26.26	42.26		MD 5 south (Mattawoman Beantown Road) – Lexington Park, Leonardtown	No direct access from northbound MD 5 to southbound US 301; missing connections made via Mattawoman Drive; south end of concurrency with MD 5
Prince George's	Brandywine	28.90	46.51		MD 5 north (Branch Avenue) – Washington	Northbound exit and southbound entrance; north end of concurrency with MD 5
Prince George's	Brandywine	29.20	46.99		MD 381 south (Brandywine Road) / Brandywine Road north – Brandywine	
Prince George's	Marlton	36.62	58.93		MD 382 south (Croom Road) – Aquasco	
Prince George's	Upper Marlboro	40.37	64.97		MD 4 (Stephanie Roper Highway) – Prince Frederick, Washington	Cloverleaf interchange
Prince George's	Upper Marlboro	41.08	66.11		MD 725 west (Marlboro Pike) / Marlboro Pike east – Upper Marlboro	
Prince George's	Bowie	46.22	74.38		Old Central Avenue	Unsigned MD 978B
Prince George's	Bowie	46.36	74.61		MD 214 (Central Avenue) – Washington	Partial cloverleaf interchange; no access from northbound US 301 to eastbound MD 214 or from eastbound MD 214 to southbound US 301; missing movements made via Old Central Avenue
Prince George's	Bowie	49.42	79.53		MD 197 north (Collington Road) – Laurel	
Prince George's	Bowie	50.28	80.92	Southern end of freeway section		
Prince George's	Bowie	50.28	80.92	13	US 50 west (John Hanson Highway) / MD 3 north (Robert Crain Highway) / Melford – Washington, Crofton	Signed as exits 13A (US 50), 13B (MD 3) and 13C (Melford); south end of concurrencies with US 50 and I-595
Anne Arundel		53.70	86.42	16	MD 424 (Davidsonville Road) – Davidsonville, Crofton	
Anne Arundel	Parole	58.48	94.11	21	I-97 north – Baltimore	
Anne Arundel	Parole	59.54	95.82	22	MD 665 east (Aris T. Allen Boulevard) / To Riva Road	
Anne Arundel	Parole	60.20	96.88	23	MD 450 (West Street) to MD 178 – Parole, Crownsville	
Anne Arundel	Parole	60.65	97.61	23A	MD 2 south (Solomons Island Road) / Jennifer Road – Parole, Prince Frederick	No exit northbound; south end of concurrency with MD 2
Anne Arundel	Parole	61.92	99.65	24	MD 70 south (Roscoe Rowe Boulevard) / Bestgate Road – Annapolis	Signed as exits 24A (MD 70) and 24B (Bestgate) southbound; eastern terminus of unsigned I-595
Anne Arundel	Severn River	62.64– 63.19	100.81– 101.69	Severn River Bridge / Pearl Harbor Memorial Bridge		
Anne Arundel	Arnold	63.83	102.72	27	MD 2 north / MD 450 south (Governor Ritchie Highway) – Severna Park, Naval Academy, Baltimore	Signed as exits 27A (MD 450) and 27B (MD 2) southbound; north end of concurrency with MD 2
Anne Arundel	Arnold	64.13	103.21		MD 648 north (Baltimore–Annapolis Boulevard)	Right-in/right-out interchange southbound; officially MD 648F
Anne Arundel	Arnold	64.78	104.25	28	Bay Dale Drive to Old Mill Bottom Road / Ferguson Road	
Anne Arundel	Cape St. Claire	66.31	106.72	29	MD 179 (St. Margarets Road/Cape St. Claire Road) / MD 908 / Busch's Frontage Road / East College Parkway	Signed as exits 29A (Busch's) and 29B (Cape St. Claire) northbound; Busch's Frontage Road and East College Parkway are MD 908A and MD 908B, respectively
Anne Arundel	Cape St. Claire	66.82	107.54	30	Whitehall Road	Northbound exit and entrance; Whitehall Road is MD 908C
Anne Arundel	Cape St. Claire	67.80	109.11	31	Whitehall Road	Right-in/right-out interchange northbound; Whitehall Road is MD 908C
Anne Arundel	Skidmore	68.60	110.40	32	Oceanic Drive – Sandy Point State Park	Oceanic Drive is MD 908D; last northbound exit before toll
Chesapeake Bay		69.26– 73.32	111.46– 118.00	Chesapeake Bay Bridge (northbound toll; E-ZPass or pay-by-plate)		
Queen Anne's	Stevensville	74.38	119.70	37	MD 8 (Business Parkway) – Stevensville, Romancoke	
Queen Anne's	Stevensville	75.03	120.75	38A	Duke Street	Right-in/right-out interchange southbound
Queen Anne's	Stevensville	75.05	120.78	38A	Thompson Creek Road	Right-in/right-out interchange northbound
Queen Anne's	Chester	76.02	122.34	38B	Services	Southbound exit and entrance; frontage road is US 50QC
Queen Anne's	Chester	76.14	122.54	39A	Cox Neck Road	Right-in/right-out interchange northbound
Queen Anne's	Chester	76.15	122.55	39A	Castle Marina Road to MD 18	Right-in/right-out interchange southbound; Castle Marina Road is MD 18H
Queen Anne's	Chester	76.65	123.36	39B	Piney Creek Road	Right-in/right-out interchange southbound; Piney Creek Road is MD 18T; connector road is MD 552A (Chester Station Road)
Queen Anne's	Chester	76.67	123.39	39B	MD 552 south (Dominion Road)	Right-in/right-out interchange northbound
Queen Anne's	Chester	77.30	124.40	40A	South Piney Road	Right-in/right-out interchange northbound
Queen Anne's	Chester	77.33	124.45	40A	Piney Creek Road	Right-in/right-out interchange southbound
Queen Anne's	Chester	77.68	125.01	40B	Dundee Avenue	Right-in/right-out interchange northbound
Queen Anne's	Kent Narrows	77.92	125.40	41	MD 18 (Main Street) – Kent Narrows West	Southbound ramps are with Piney Narrows Road
Queen Anne's	Kent Narrows	78.20– 78.78	125.85– 126.78	Kent Narrows Bridge		
Queen Anne's	Kent Narrows	79.08	127.27	42	MD 18 (Main Street) – Kent Narrows East	Southbound right-in/right-out interchange with MD 835G (Kent Narrows Road); northbound right-in/right-out interchange with MD 835 (Seward Marina Road)
Queen Anne's	Grasonville	79.76	128.36	43A	Jackson Creek Road	Southbound right-in/right-out interchange; Jackson Creek Road is MD 18U
Queen Anne's	Grasonville	79.78	128.39	43A	MD 18 (Main Street) – Grasonville	Northbound right-in/right-out interchange with unnamed MD 18F
Queen Anne's	Grasonville	80.53	129.60	43B	Chester River Beach Road	No southbound exit; Chester River Beach road is MD 18V
Queen Anne's	Grasonville	80.93	130.24	44A	VFW Avenue	Southbound right-in/right-out interchange; VFW Avenue is MD 18W
Queen Anne's	Grasonville	80.94	130.26	44A	Station Lane	Northbound right-in/right-out interchange; Station Lane is MD 18I
Queen Anne's	Grasonville	81.29	130.82	44B	Winchester Creek Road	Southbound right-in/right-out interchange; Winchester Creek Road is MD 835H
Queen Anne's	Grasonville	81.30	130.84	44B	Evans Avenue	Northbound right-in/right-out interchange; Evans Avenue is MD 18Z
Queen Anne's	Grasonville	81.63	131.37	45A	Hissey Road	Southbound right-in/right-out interchange; Hissey Road is MD 835I
Queen Anne's	Grasonville	81.64	131.39	45A	Hess Road	Northbound right-in/right-out interchange; Hess Road is MD 18X
Queen Anne's	Grasonville	82.06	132.06	45B	Nesbit Road	Nesbit Road is MD 835K
Queen Anne's	Queenstown	83.25	133.98		US 50 east (Ocean Gateway) – Ocean City	Northbound exit and southbound entrance; north end of concurrency with US 50
Queen Anne's	Queenstown	83.25	133.98	Northern end of freeway section		
Queen Anne's	Queenstown	83.81	134.88		MD 18 (Outlet Center Drive/Main Street) – Queenstown	Superstreet intersection; Outlet Center Drive is MD 18S and Main Street is MD 18C
Queen Anne's	Queenstown	84.31	135.68		MD 456 (Del Rhodes Avenue) to US 50 – Queenstown	Superstreet intersection
Queen Anne's		89.01	143.25		MD 213 (Centreville Road) – Centreville, Wye Mills	Partial cloverleaf interchange; before this was built, the junction was the last full traffic signal on US 301 in Maryland
Queen Anne's		91.91	147.91		MD 304 (Ruthsburg Road) – Centreville, Ruthsburg	Interchange
Queen Anne's		93.60	150.63		MD 305 (Hope Road) – Centreville, Hope	
Queen Anne's		96.37	155.09		Hayden Clark Road – Bay Country Welcome Center	Hayden Clark Road is MD 834
Queen Anne's	Price	98.38	158.33		MD 405 (Price Station Road) – Church Hill, Price	
Queen Anne's		100.00	160.93		MD 19 (Roberts Station Road) – Church Hill, Ingleside	
Queen Anne's		101.54	163.41		MD 302 east (Barclay Road) / Hall Road west – Barclay, Dover	
Queen Anne's		103.83	167.10		MD 300 (Sudlersville Road) – Church Hill, Sudlersville, Dover	Superstreet intersection
Queen Anne's		106.00	170.59		MD 290 (Dudley Corner Road) – Sudlersville, Pondtown, Crumpton	Interchange; Sudlersville signed northbound; Pondtown signed southbound
Queen Anne's		109.22	175.77		MD 544 (McGinnes Road) – Chestertown, Sudlersville	Superstreet intersection
Kent		111.21	178.98		MD 291 (River Road) – Chestertown, Millington	Right-in/right-out intersections with MD 701 (Howard Johnson Road) northbound and MD 701A (Edge Road) southbound
Kent		115.10	185.24		MD 313 (Galena Road) – Galena, Massey	Superstreet intersection
Kent	Sassafras	118.72	191.06		MD 290 (Galena Sassafras Road) – Chestertown, Galena	Diamond interchange
Cecil		120.34	193.67		MD 299 south (Massey Sassafras Road) / Sassafras Road north – Cecilton, Massey	Last intersection before US 301 toll road in Delaware
Cecil	Warwick	122.85	197.71		US 301 Toll north – Wilmington	Continuation into Delaware
1.000 mi = 1.609 km; 1.000 km = 0.621 mi: Closed/former; Concurrency terminus; Electronic toll collection; Incomplete access

== See also ==
U.S. Route 301
Previous state: Virginia	Maryland	Next state: Delaware
