= Maryland Route 552 =

State highway in Maryland, United States

Maryland Route 552
- Dominion Road
- Maryland Route 552 highlighted in red

Route information
- Maintained by MDSHA
- Length: 2.20 mi (3.54 km)
- Existed: 1933–present

Major junctions
- South end: Little Creek Road at Dominion
- MD 18 in Chester
- North end: US 50 / US 301 in Chester

Location
- Country: United States
- State: Maryland
- Counties: Queen Anne's

Highway system
- Maryland highway system; Interstate; US; State; Scenic Byways
← MD 550	→ MD 553

Maryland Route 552 (MD 552) is a state highway in the U.S. state of Maryland. The state highway runs 2.20 miles (3.54 km) from Dominion north to U.S. Route 50 (US 50)/US 301 in Chester. MD 552 was constructed south of MD 18 in the early 1930s. The state highway was extended north to US 50/US 301 in the early 1990s.

== Route description ==
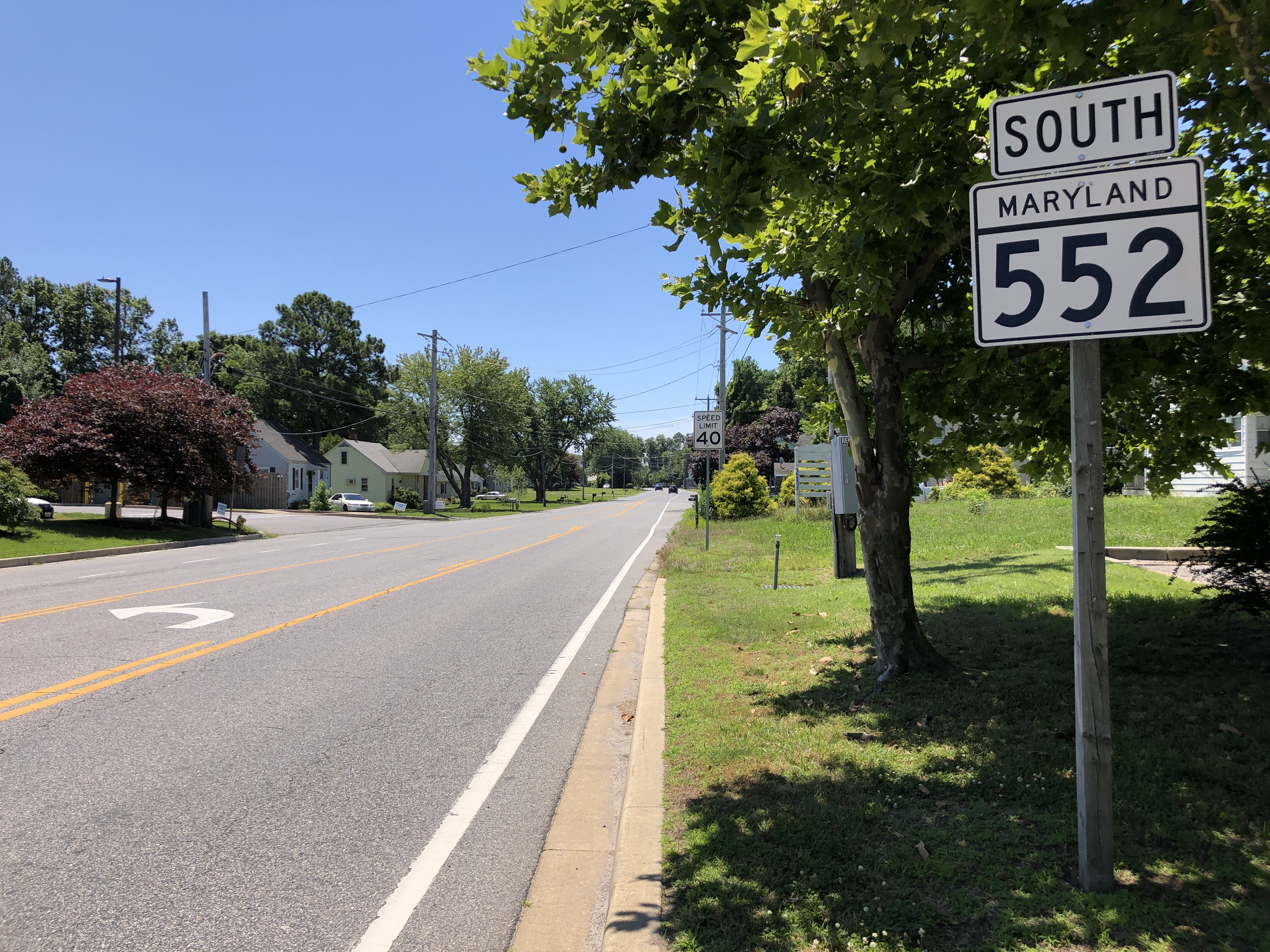
View south along MD 552 at MD 18 in Chester

MD 552 begins at a point between First Street and Church Street in the unincorporated village of Dominion. The highway continues south as county-maintained Little Creek Road. MD 552 heads east as a two-lane undivided road to an intersection with Parson Island Road, where the state highway turns north. The state highway passes through farmland and becomes lined with residences as it approaches an intersection with MD 18 (Main Street) in Chester. MD 552 continues a short distance between shopping centers to its northern terminus at a right-in/right-out interchange with US 50/US 301 (Blue Star Memorial Highway) at exit 39B.

== History ==
MD 552 was paved starting from MD 18 toward Dominion in two sections that opened in 1933 and 1935, respectively. MD 552 was extended north to connect with the ramps for exit 39B of US 50/US 301 when that highway was upgraded to a freeway around 1991.

== Junction list ==
The entire route is in Queen Anne's County.

Location	mi	km	Destinations	Notes
Dominion	0.00	0.00	Little Creek Road south	Southern terminus
Chester	2.11	3.40	MD 18 (Main Street) to US 50 west – Stevensville, Grasonville	Officially MD 18B
Chester	2.20	3.54	US 50 east / US 301 north (Blue Star Memorial Highway) – Easton, Centreville	Right-in/right-out interchange with eastbound US 50/US 301 (exit 39B); northern terminus
1.000 mi = 1.609 km; 1.000 km = 0.621 mi: Incomplete access

== Auxiliary route ==
MD 552A is the designation for Chester Station Road, an unsigned 0.08-mile (0.13 km) highway along the same line as MD 552 on the north side of US 50/US 301. The state highway runs from a right-in/right-out interchange with westbound US 50/US 301 at exit 39B north to Piney Creek Road, which is unsigned MD 18T west of the intersection to the signed mainline of MD 18.
