= Dominion, Maryland =

Unincorporated community in Maryland, United States

- Unincorporated community
- Location within Maryland Location within the United States
- Coordinates: 38°56′49″N 76°16′52″W
- Country: United States
- State: Maryland
- County: Queen Anne's
- Elevation: 10 ft (3.0 m)
- Time zone: UTC-5 (Eastern (EST))
  - Summer (DST): UTC-4 (EDT)
- Area codes: 410 & 443
- GNIS feature ID: 597338

Dominion is an unincorporated community located in Kent Island (the largest island in the Chesapeake Bay) which is in Queen Anne's County, Maryland, United States. Dominion is located along Maryland Route 552, 2 miles (3.2 km) south of Chester.
