= Melford (Mitchellville, Maryland) =

Historic house in Maryland, United States

- U.S. National Register of Historic Places
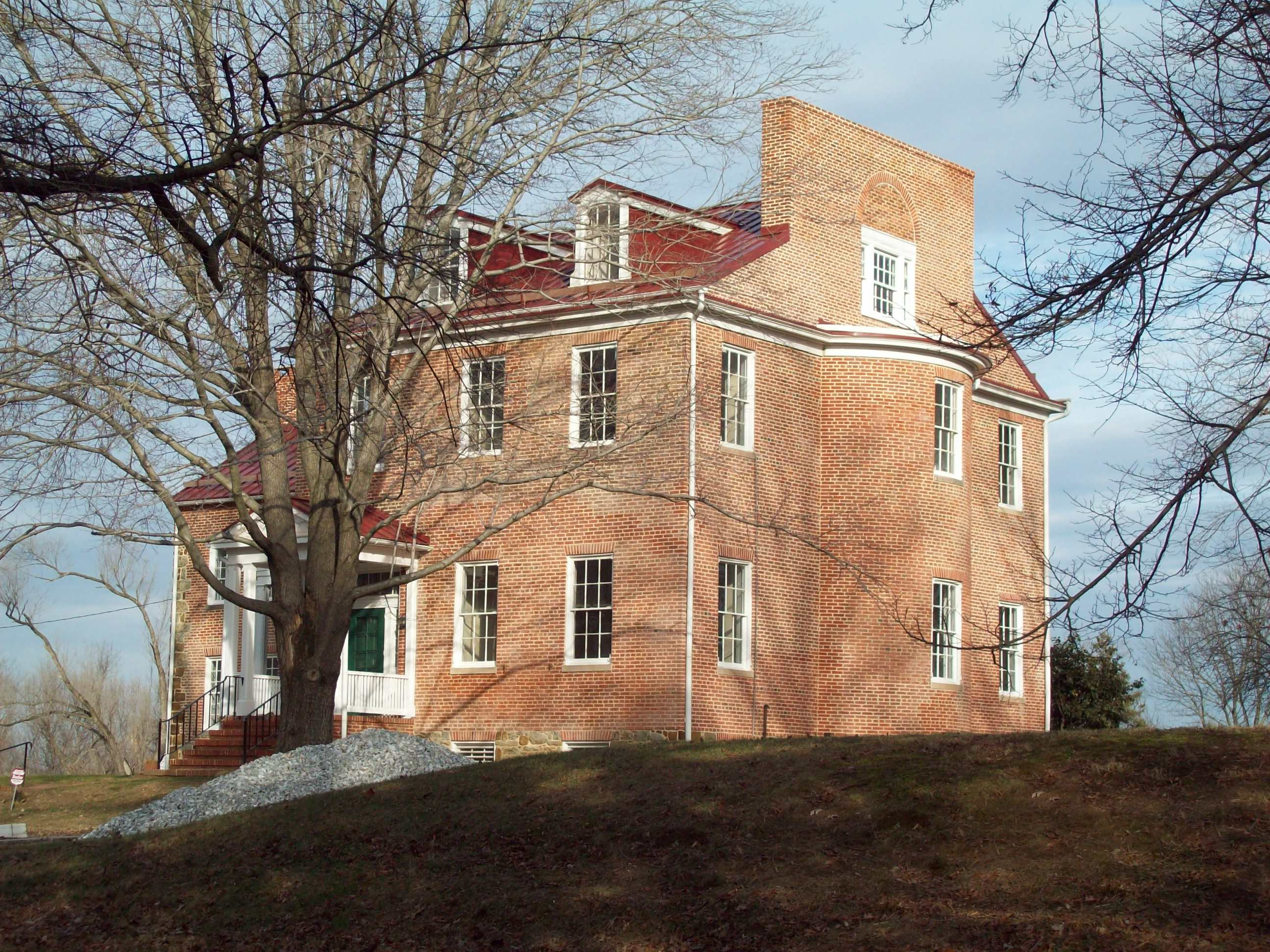
- Melford, December 2008

- Location within Maryland Location within the United States
- Location: Science Drive in Maryland Science & Technology Center, Bowie, Maryland
- Coordinates: 38°57′35″N 76°42′34″W
- Built: mid-late 1840s
- Architectural style: Greek Revival
- NRHP reference No.: 88000271
- Added to NRHP: April 6, 1988

Melford is a historic plantation house located on the grounds of the Maryland Science and Technology Center, near the intersection of U.S. Route 301 and U.S. Route 50, at Bowie, Prince George's County, Maryland. The house is multi-part, gable-roofed, brick and stone dwelling house constructed probably in the mid-late 1840s, with elements of the Greek Revival style.

== History ==
The land that made up the Melford plantation was part of a tract, originally called Howerton's Range which was a 400-acre parcel that John Howerton obtained in 1670. It is part of Prince George's County and had historically been inhabited by the Piscataway people, an Algonquin language speaking tribe, as well as the Patuxent people and other Native American groups.

Melford was built by Dr. Richard Duckett in 1810, replacing a previous structure. Dr. Richard Duckett was the brother of Allen Bowie Duckett, and the son of Thomas Duckett, who in 1796 was judge of the Prince George's County Court, and one of the principal slaveholders in the area.

Melford was listed on the National Register of Historic Places in 1988.

== Grounds ==
The grounds include three outbuildings: a three-bay gable-roofed slave quarter probably dating from the 18th century; a pyramidal-roofed meat house also dating from the late 18th century; and a 20th-century pyramidal-roofed pump house. The landscape consists of terraced gardens, falling away from the house on three levels. Melford was home for 140 years to two prominent local families, the Ducketts and the Hardestys.
