= Maryland Route 456 =

State highway in Maryland, United States

Maryland Route 456
- Del Rhodes Avenue
- Maryland Route 456 highlighted in red

Route information
- Maintained by MDSHA
- Length: 1.20 mi (1.93 km) 2 sections
- Existed: 1933–present

Major junctions
- South end: US 50 near Queenstown
- MD 656 in Queenstown; US 301 in Queenstown
- North end: MD 18 in Queenstown

Location
- Country: United States
- State: Maryland
- Counties: Queen Anne's

Highway system
- Maryland highway system; Interstate; US; State; Scenic Byways
← MD 454	→ MD 458

Maryland Route 456 (MD 456) is a state highway in the U.S. state of Maryland. Known as Del Rhodes Avenue, the state highway runs 1.20 miles (1.93 km) from U.S. Route 50 (US 50) north to MD 18 within Queenstown. MD 456, which serves as a cut-off between US 50 and US 301 just east of the split of the two highways, is officially separated into two sections, MD 456 and MD 456A, by a superstreet intersection with US 301. The state highway was constructed in the early 1930s as a cut-off between Queenstown and MD 404, then the main east–west highway in western Queen Anne's County. MD 456 was extended south in the late 1940s when US 50 was moved to its present course.

== Route description ==
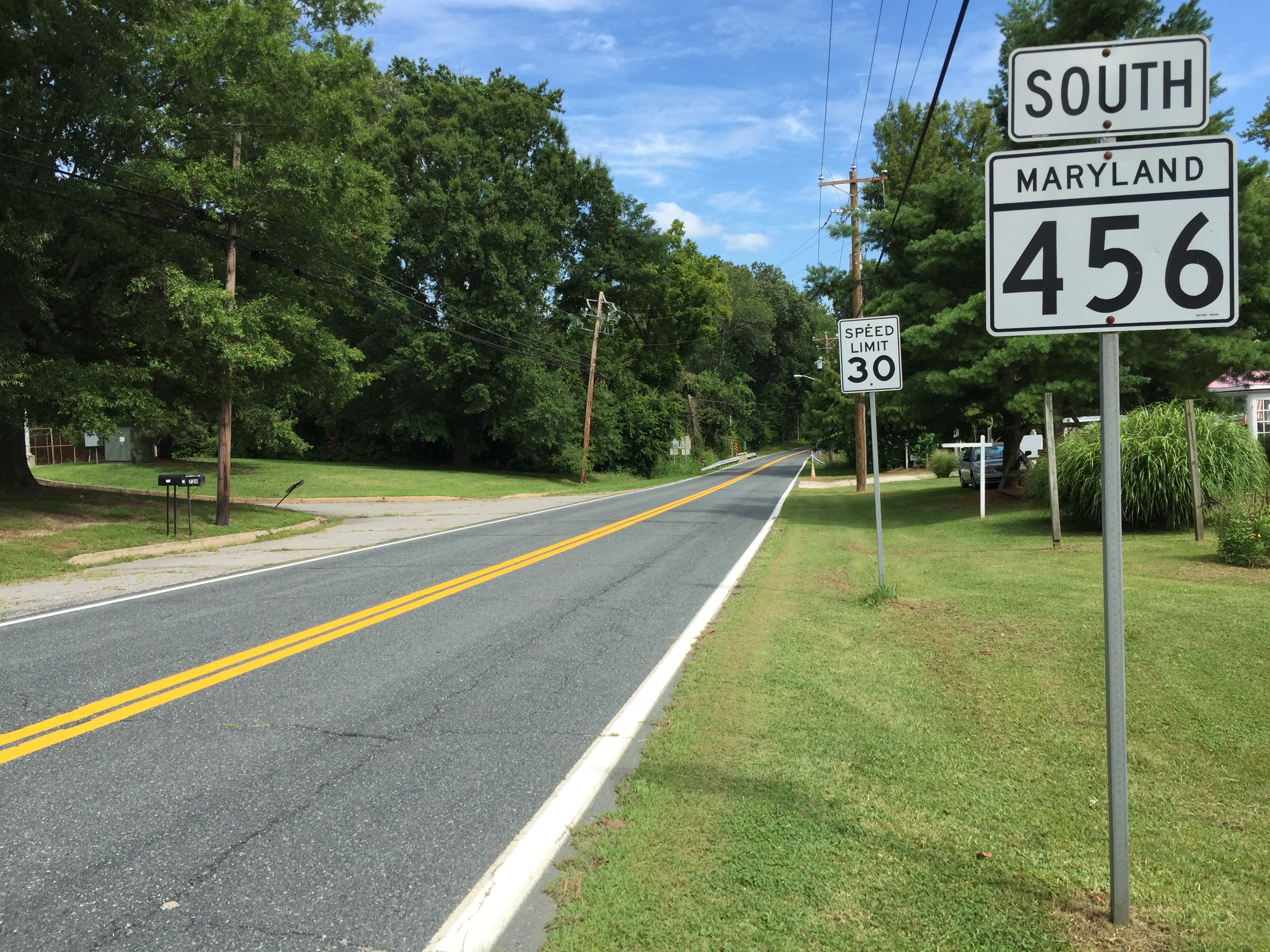
View south along MD 456 at MD 656 in Queenstown

MD 456 begins at an intersection with US 50 (Ocean Gateway) just east of Queenstown. The ramp from westbound US 50 to northbound MD 456 is the original alignment and has the unsigned designated US 50QB. MD 456 heads northwest as a two-lane undivided road along a row of residences. The state highway enters the town of Queenstown after crossing the Wye River. MD 656 (Friels Road) splits to the west before MD 456 officially ends at US 301 (Blue Star Memorial Highway), where the two highways meet at a superstreet intersection. Traffic on MD 456 is required to turn right onto US 301, make a U-turn, and turn right again to continue on MD 456. The roadway, now officially MD 456A, continues 0.32 miles (0.51 km) to the highway's northern terminus at MD 18 (Main Street), officially MD 18C, in the center of Queenstown.

== History ==
The Eastern Shore Boulevard, designated MD 404 by 1933, was completed around Queenstown by 1930. MD 456 was constructed from the MD 656 intersection north to the center of Queenstown shortly after 1930. When US 50 was moved to its present alignment south of Queenstown in 1949, MD 456 was extended south along the old section of MD 404 and MD 656 was designated on the section of old MD 404 between MD 456 and MD 18. The MD 456–US 301 junction was transformed into a superstreet intersection in 2003, resulting in the designation of MD 456A north of the junction.

== Junction list ==
The entire route is in Queenstown, Queen Anne's County.

mi	km	Destinations	Notes
0.00	0.00	US 50 (Ocean Gateway) – Bay Bridge	Southern terminus of MD 456
0.56	0.90	MD 656 west (Friels Road)	Eastern terminus of MD 656
0.88	1.42	US 301 (Blue Star Memorial Highway) – Bay Bridge, Wilmington	Superstreet intersection; northern terminus of MD 456; southern terminus of MD 456A
1.20	1.93	MD 18 (Main Street) – Centreville	Northern terminus of MD 456A; officially MD 18C
1.000 mi = 1.609 km; 1.000 km = 0.621 mi
