= Marlton, Maryland =

- Census-designated place
- Flag

- Location of Marlton, Maryland
- Coordinates: 38°46′0″N 76°47′20″W
- Country: United States
- State: Maryland
- County: Prince George's

Area
  - Total: 5.95 sq mi (15.40 km^{2})
  - Land: 5.93 sq mi (15.36 km^{2})
  - Water: 0.015 sq mi (0.04 km^{2})
- Elevation: 200 ft (60 m)

Population (2020)
  - Total: 9,802
  - Density: 1,652.5/sq mi (638.02/km^{2})
- Time zone: UTC−5 (Eastern (EST))
  - Summer (DST): UTC−4 (EDT)
- FIPS code: 24-50775
- GNIS feature ID: 1714754
- Website: https://www.marlton.org/

Marlton is an unincorporated area and census-designated place (CDP) in Prince George's County, Maryland, United States. The population was 9,802 at the 2020 census. The Marlton housing development, at first briefly called "Brandywine Country", grew up along U.S. Route 301 in the 1970s, and is part of the greater Upper Marlboro community. Originally made up of only single-family homes, more recently townhouses have been added.

== Geography ==
Marlton is located at 38°46′00″N 76°47′20″W (38.766568, −76.788922).

According to the United States Census Bureau, the CDP has a total area of 6.0 square miles (16 km^{2}), all land.

== Demographics ==
Historical population
Census	Pop.	Note	%±
2000	7,798		—
2010	9,031		15.8%
2020	9,802		8.5%
U.S. Decennial Census; 2010 2020

=== Racial and ethnic composition ===
Marlton CDP, Maryland – Racial and ethnic composition Note: the US Census treats Hispanic/Latino as an ethnic category. This table excludes Latinos from the racial categories and assigns them to a separate category. Hispanics/Latinos may be of any race.
Race / Ethnicity (NH = Non-Hispanic)	Pop 2000	Pop 2010	Pop 2020	% 2000	% 2010	% 2020
White alone (NH)	2,954	1,122	779	37.88%	12.42%	7.95%
Black or African American alone (NH)	4,311	7,187	8,098	55.28%	79.58%	82.62%
Native American or Alaska Native alone (NH)	21	50	32	0.27%	0.55%	0.33%
Asian alone (NH)	122	138	89	1.56%	1.53%	0.91%
Native Hawaiian or Pacific Islander alone (NH)	1	5	0	0.01%	0.06%	0.00%
Other race alone (NH)	17	12	70	0.22%	0.13%	0.71%
Mixed race or Multiracial (NH)	183	283	353	2.35%	3.13%	3.60%
Hispanic or Latino (any race)	189	234	381	2.42%	2.59%	3.89%
Total	7,798	9,031	9,802	100.00%	100.00%	100.00%

=== 2020 census ===
As of the 2020 census, Marlton had a population of 9,802. The median age was 40.8 years. 22.3% of residents were under the age of 18 and 13.2% of residents were 65 years of age or older. For every 100 females there were 80.5 males, and for every 100 females age 18 and over there were 75.1 males age 18 and over.

98.8% of residents lived in urban areas, while 1.2% lived in rural areas.

There were 3,643 households in Marlton, of which 33.7% had children under the age of 18 living in them. Of all households, 43.4% were married-couple households, 13.5% were households with a male householder and no spouse or partner present, and 37.8% were households with a female householder and no spouse or partner present. About 24.3% of all households were made up of individuals and 8.0% had someone living alone who was 65 years of age or older.

There were 3,770 housing units, of which 3.4% were vacant. The homeowner vacancy rate was 1.4% and the rental vacancy rate was 4.7%.

=== 2000 census ===
As of the census of 2000, there were 7,798 people, 2,830 households, and 2,153 families residing in the CDP. The population density was 1,295.3 inhabitants per square mile (500.1/km^{2}). There were 2,932 housing units at an average density of 487.0 per square mile (188.0/km^{2}). The racial makeup of the CDP was 39.24% White, 55.49% African American, 0.28% Native American, 1.56% Asian, 0.01% Pacific Islander, 0.82% from other races, and 2.59% from two or more races. Hispanic or Latino of any race were 2.42% of the population.

There were 2,830 households, out of which 41.5% had children under the age of 18 living with them, 54.7% were married couples living together, 17.2% had a female householder with no husband present, and 23.9% were non-families. 18.3% of all households were made up of individuals, and 2.6% had someone living alone who was 65 years of age or older. The average household size was 2.75 and the average family size was 3.12.

In the CDP, the population was spread out, with 28.6% under the age of 18, 6.9% from 18 to 24, 35.8% from 25 to 44, 22.8% from 45 to 64, and 5.9% who were 65 years of age or older. The median age was 34 years. For every 100 females, there were 92.2 males. For every 100 females age 18 and over, there were 84.8 males.

The median income for a household in the CDP was $73,844, and the median income for a family was $82,936. Males had a median income of $43,659 versus $39,928 for females. The per capita income for the CDP was $28,558. About 1.2% of families and 2.3% of the population were below the poverty line, including 2.3% of those under age 18 and 2.8% of those age 65 or over.

== Government ==
Prince George's County Police Department District 5 Station in Clinton CDP serves the community.

== Education ==
Marlton residents are assigned to schools in Prince George's County Public Schools.

Marlton and Mattaponi elementary schools serve sections of the CDP. James Madison Middle School and Gwynn Park Middle School serve sections of the CDP. Frederick Douglass High School serves all of the CDP.
