= Maryland Route 925 =

State highway in Maryland, United States

Maryland Route 925
- Old Washington Road
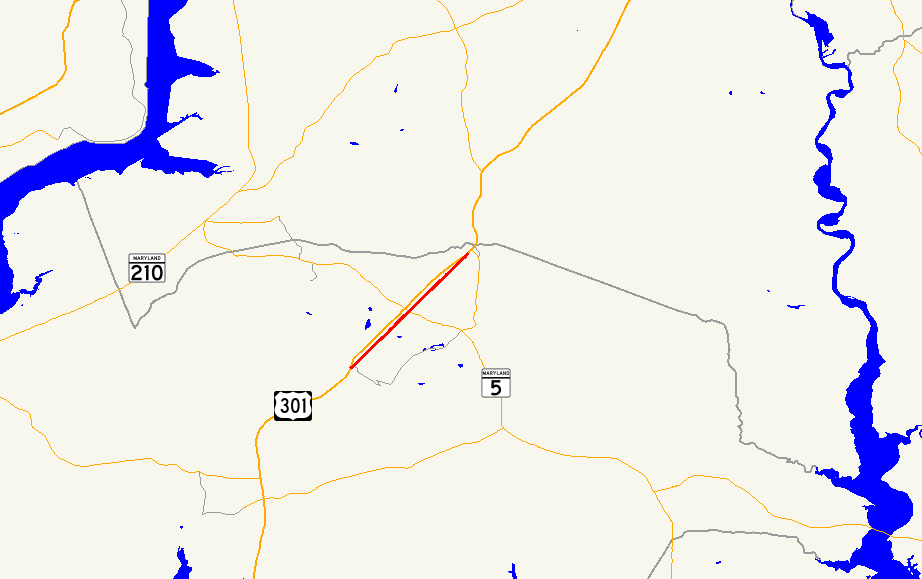

Route information
- Maintained by MDSHA
- Length: 2.49 mi (4.01 km)
- Existed: 1961–present

Major junctions
- South end: Billingsley Road in White Plains
- North end: MD 5 Bus. in Waldorf

Location
- Country: United States
- State: Maryland
- Counties: Charles

Highway system
- Maryland highway system; Interstate; US; State; Scenic Byways
← MD 924	→ MD 927

Maryland Route 925 (MD 925) is a state highway in the U.S. state of Maryland. Known as Old Washington Road, the state highway runs 2.49 miles (4.01 km) from Billingsley Road in White Plains north to MD 5 Business in Waldorf. MD 925 and the county-maintained portion of Old Washington Road to the north comprise the old alignment of U.S. Route 301 (US 301) in northern Charles County. Originally constructed as part of MD 3 and MD 5 in the early 1910s, the highway become part of US 301 in the early 1940s, then was bypassed by the present US 301 divided highway in the mid-1950s. The White Plains–Waldorf portion of the old road was renumbered MD 925 in the early 1960s.

== Route description ==
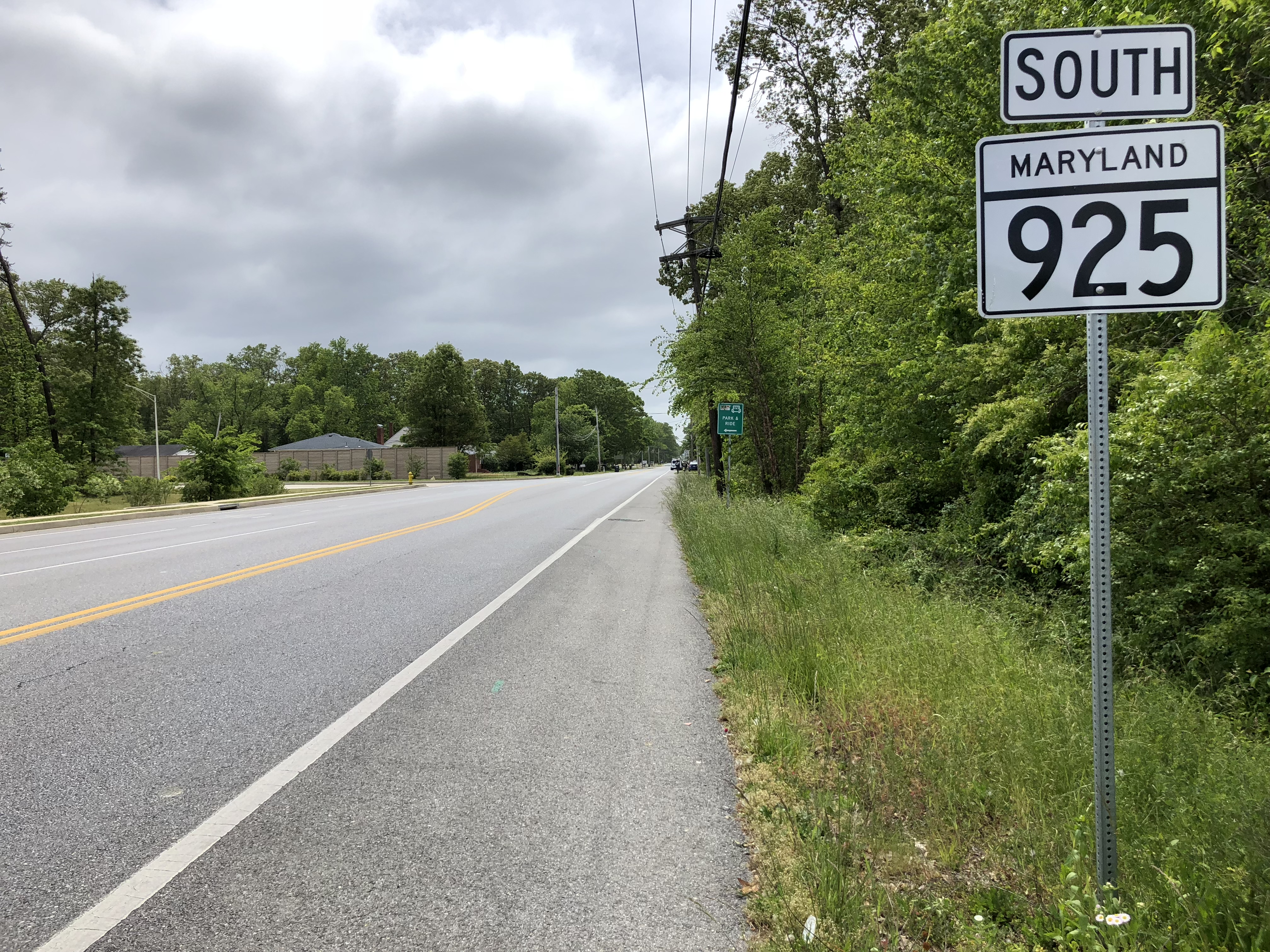
View south along MD 925 at Smallwood Drive in St. Charles

MD 925 begins at an intersection with Billingsley Road in White Plains, just east of the latter highway's intersection with US 301 (Robert Crain Highway). There is no direct access to northbound MD 925 from eastbound Billingsley Road. MD 925 heads northeast as a two-lane undivided road through a residential area, paralleling US 301 to the west and CSX's Popes Creek Subdivision railroad line to the east. The route passes northwest of a park and ride lot serving MTA Maryland commuter buses before intersecting Smallwood Drive in St. Charles. Shortly after this intersection, the state highway expands to a three-lane road with a center left-turn lane and enters a commercial area. MD 925 reaches its northern terminus at an intersection with MD 5 Business (Leonardtown Road) in Waldorf. Old Washington Road continues northeast as a county highway, passing through an industrial area before reconnecting with US 301 via Sub-Station Road just south of US 301's intersection with MD 5.

== History ==
Old Washington Road is the original alignment of US 301 from White Plains through Waldorf to the Prince George's County line. The route was marked for improvement as one of the original state roads by the Maryland State Roads Commission in 1909. The highway between White Plains and the county line was constructed as a 14-foot (4.3 m) gravel road in 1912. The highway was designated MD 3 for its whole length and MD 5 north of Waldorf in 1927. By 1930, the highway was the most heavily traveled highway in Charles County, so the road was widened to 20 feet (6.1 m) with concrete shoulders and resurfaced with bituminous concrete. Around 1948, the route, now part of US 301, was widened to 24 feet (7.3 m). The expanded highway still was unable to handle the traffic burden, so in 1952 a divided highway bypass of Old Washington Road was started from the Prince George's County end. The new US 301 divided highway reached Waldorf by 1954 and was completed to White Plains in 1956. Old Washington Road originally kept the MD 3 designation. However, by 1961, Old Washington Road was designated MD 925 south of Waldorf and transferred to county maintenance north of Waldorf.

== Junction list ==
The entire route is in Charles County.

Location	mi	km	Destinations	Notes
White Plains	0.00	0.00	Billingsley Road to US 301 – La Plata	Southern terminus; no direct access from eastbound Billingsley Road to northbound MD 925
Waldorf	2.49	4.01	MD 5 Bus. (Leonardtown Road) / Old Washington Road north – Hughesville, Accokeek	Northern terminus
1.000 mi = 1.609 km; 1.000 km = 0.621 mi

== Auxiliary route ==
MD 925A is the designation for the 0.05-mile (0.080 km) section of Billingsley Road between US 301 and the southern terminus of MD 925 in White Plains.
