= Queen Anne's County, Maryland =

County in Maryland, United States

- County
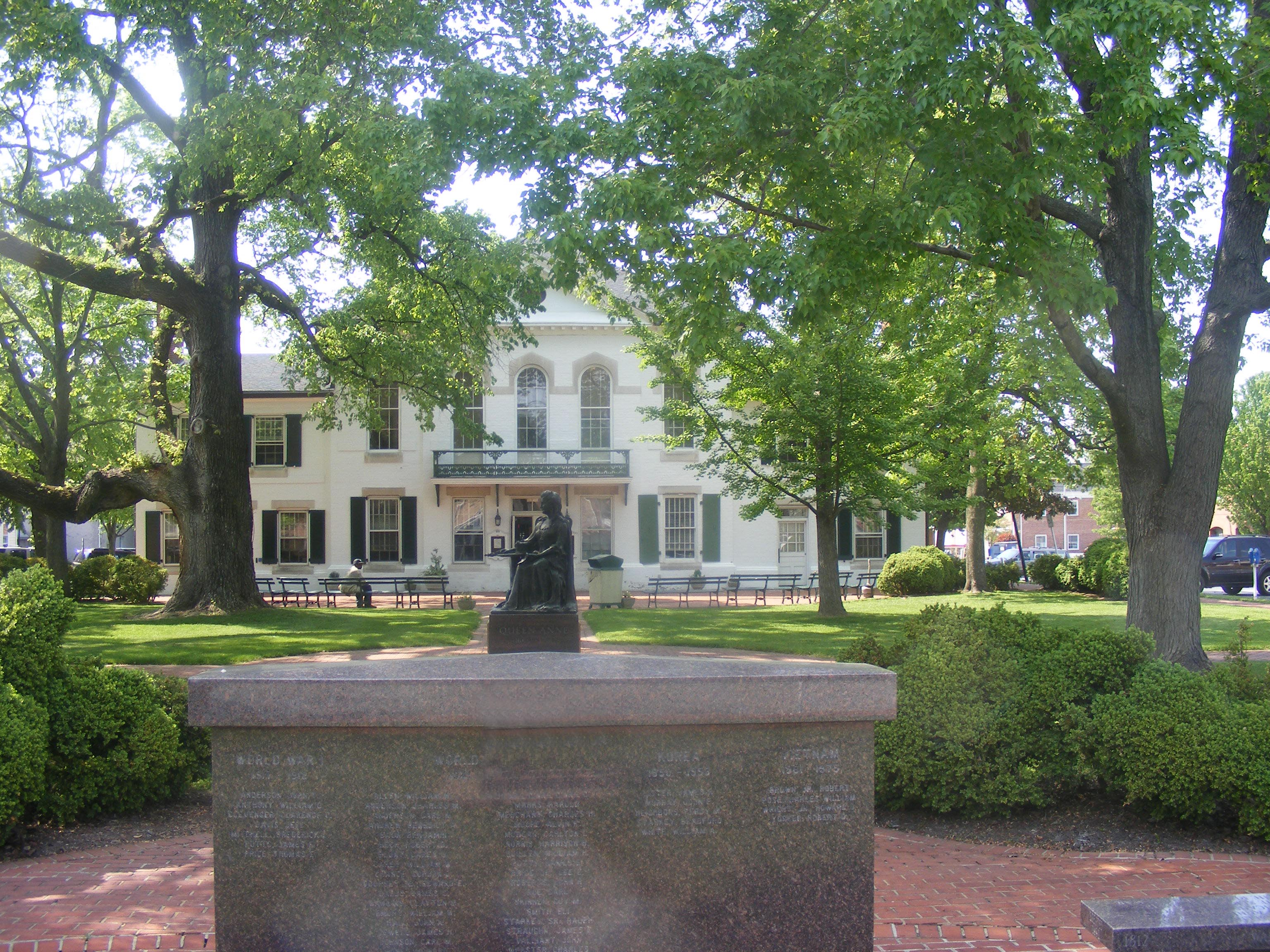
- Queen Anne's County Courthouse in Centreville, Maryland

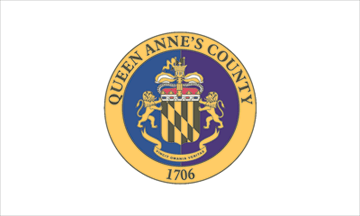
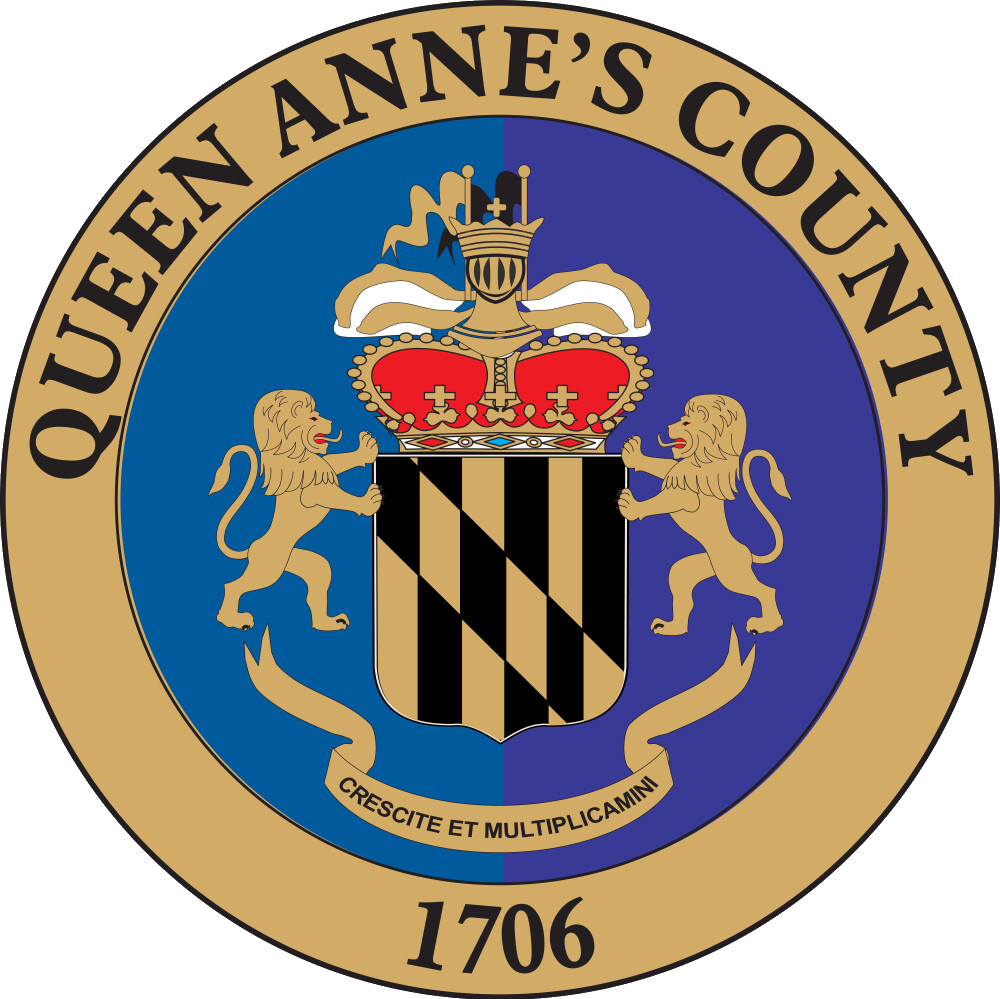
- Flag Seal

- Location within the U.S. state of Maryland
- Coordinates: 39°02′N 76°05′W
- Country: United States
- State: Maryland
- Founded: 1706
- Named for: Queen Anne
- Seat: Centreville
- Largest community: Stevensville

Area
  - Total: 511 sq mi (1,320 km^{2})
  - Land: 372 sq mi (960 km^{2})
  - Water: 139 sq mi (360 km^{2}) 27%

Population (2020)
  - Total: 49,874
  - Estimate (2025): 54,448 ▲
  - Density: 134/sq mi (51.8/km^{2})
- Time zone: UTC−5 (Eastern)
  - Summer (DST): UTC−4 (EDT)
- Congressional district: 1st
- Website: www.qac.org

Queen Anne's County is located in the U.S. state of Maryland. As of the 2020 United States census, the population was 49,874. Its county seat and most populous municipality is Centreville. The census-designated place of Stevensville is the county's most populous place with a population of 7,442 as of 2020. The county is named for Queen Anne of Great Britain, who reigned when the county was established in 1706 during the colonial period. The county is part of the Mid-Eastern Shore region of the state.

Queen Anne's County is included in the Baltimore-Columbia-Towson, MD Metropolitan Statistical Area, which is also included in the Washington-Baltimore-Arlington, DC-MD-VA-WV-PA Combined Statistical Area, and is the easternmost in both.

Chesapeake Bay Bridge connects Kent Island in Queen Anne's County across the Chesapeake Bay to Anne Arundel County. The American Discovery Trail runs through the county.

== History ==
Queen Anne's County has 265 miles of waterfront, much of that being the shores of Kent Island, which stands out from the eastern shore of the Chesapeake Bay. From the waters of this county, watermen have harvested oysters, crabs, and terrapin. Migrating waterfowl overwinter here, and hunting for geese and ducks has been an important part of the county's history. The first Anglo-European settlement in Maryland was on Kent Island on August 21, 1631, and included twenty-five settlers in a manor house, a fort, and other buildings. The settlement was referred to as Winston's Island. The first houses were built similar to log cabins. The county has a number of properties on the National Register of Historic Places, but nothing remains of this original settlement. Stevensville, earlier known as Broad Creek, is one of the oldest towns still existing.

Queen Anne's County was organized under a sheriff in 1706, bounded by Talbot, Kent, and Dorchester counties. In 1713, Queen Anne's County became an English postal district; the sheriff was also appointed as the postmaster and would travel to Annapolis, Maryland by boat across the Chesapeake Bay to obtain mail. In 1773 a part of Queen Anne's County, together with a portion of Dorchester County, was taken to form Caroline County. The county now is enclosed by Talbot, Caroline, and Kent counties, as well as the Chesapeake Bay.

By the time of Independence, the county had several churches, a government, school, and a postal system. It was developed for agriculture, and enslaved African Americans worked the fields of plantations. Tobacco was an early commodity crop but it exhausted the soil. By the Revolution, some planters were converting to mixed agriculture, which was less labor-intensive. They sold excess slaves in the domestic trade to the developing cotton plantations of the Deep South.

In 1876, Queen Anne's County had the first printed independent paper called the Maryland Citizen. A bank was located in Centreville; the Centreville National Bank is still operating. A railway was constructed here in 1868; it operated from Baltimore, passing around the top of the Chesapeake Bay down to Queenstown, and connected with other railroads that continued east into Delaware as far as Rehoboth, and southward to the Eastern Shore of Virginia.

In the 20th century, Queen Anne's County was the home of Jimmie Foxx, who was elected to the Baseball Hall of Fame. A statue and small park commemorate him in Sudlersville, where Foxx grew up.

== Politics and government ==
Queen Anne's was historically the most strongly secessionist county in Maryland, dominated by the Democratic Party of the planters. Following the American Civil War, the predominately conservative white voters voted for the Democratic presidential nominee in every election from 1868 to 1948, though Herbert Hoover came within a point of defeating Al Smith in 1928 amidst great Southern resentment to Smith's Catholicism and opposition to Prohibition. Former general Dwight D. Eisenhower became the first Republican to carry the county in 1952.

Since the late 20th century, Queen Anne's white voters have largely shifted to the Republican Party, in a realignment that has taken place among conservative whites across the South following the tumultuous 1960s and passage of national civil rights legislation. No Democratic presidential candidate has carried Queen Anne's County since Texan Lyndon Johnson’s 1964 landslide. Democrat Jimmy Carter in 1980 remains the last Democrat to obtain even forty percent of the county's vote, and he in 1976 was the last to come within ten points of winning the county.

Voter registration and party enrollment as of March 2024
Republican	20,046	49.41%
Democratic	11,031	27.19%
Unaffiliated	8,867	21.86%
Libertarian	233	0.57%
Other parties	393	0.97%
Total	40,570	100%

United States presidential election results for Queen Anne's County, Maryland
Year	Republican / Whig		Democratic		Third party(ies)	
Year	No.	%	No.	%	No.	%
1836	637	55.20%	517	44.80%	0	0.00%
1840	778	54.07%	661	45.93%	0	0.00%
1844	749	50.92%	722	49.08%	0	0.00%
1848	725	54.23%	612	45.77%	0	0.00%
1852	723	49.59%	735	50.41%	0	0.00%
1856	0	0.00%	741	45.05%	904	54.95%
1860	0	0.00%	87	4.64%	1,787	95.36%
1864	384	20.58%	1,482	79.42%	0	0.00%
1868	275	15.05%	1,552	84.95%	0	0.00%
1872	1,654	47.83%	1,804	52.17%	0	0.00%
1876	1,476	40.72%	2,149	59.28%	0	0.00%
1880	1,666	41.93%	2,307	58.07%	0	0.00%
1884	1,710	42.18%	2,344	57.82%	0	0.00%
1888	1,738	43.19%	2,286	56.81%	0	0.00%
1892	1,579	39.25%	2,281	56.70%	163	4.05%
1896	1,917	41.53%	2,516	54.51%	183	3.96%
1900	1,873	41.27%	2,544	56.06%	121	2.67%
1904	1,487	38.28%	2,258	58.12%	140	3.60%
1908	1,135	34.04%	2,086	62.57%	113	3.39%
1912	1,311	38.27%	1,902	55.52%	213	6.22%
1916	1,242	35.50%	2,206	63.05%	51	1.46%
1920	2,157	37.43%	3,519	61.07%	86	1.49%
1924	1,656	33.74%	3,155	64.28%	97	1.98%
1928	2,666	49.47%	2,700	50.10%	23	0.43%
1932	1,583	29.90%	3,683	69.57%	28	0.53%
1936	1,946	35.36%	3,548	64.47%	9	0.16%
1940	2,508	40.94%	3,581	58.46%	37	0.60%
1944	2,119	41.18%	3,027	58.82%	0	0.00%
1948	2,038	42.98%	2,660	56.09%	44	0.93%
1952	3,170	50.60%	3,058	48.81%	37	0.59%
1956	3,321	55.70%	2,641	44.30%	0	0.00%
1960	2,906	48.18%	3,126	51.82%	0	0.00%
1964	1,955	32.55%	4,052	67.45%	0	0.00%
1968	2,888	46.92%	1,969	31.99%	1,298	21.09%
1972	4,380	70.45%	1,712	27.54%	125	2.01%
1976	3,479	50.16%	3,457	49.84%	0	0.00%
1980	4,749	52.12%	3,820	41.92%	543	5.96%
1984	6,784	69.49%	2,938	30.09%	41	0.42%
1988	7,803	66.68%	3,857	32.96%	43	0.37%
1992	6,829	47.05%	4,668	32.16%	3,017	20.79%
1996	7,147	52.40%	5,054	37.06%	1,438	10.54%
2000	9,970	59.48%	6,257	37.33%	534	3.19%
2004	14,489	66.48%	7,070	32.44%	235	1.08%
2008	15,087	62.74%	8,575	35.66%	383	1.59%
2012	15,823	63.58%	8,556	34.38%	509	2.05%
2016	16,993	64.07%	7,973	30.06%	1,557	5.87%
2020	18,741	61.87%	10,709	35.35%	840	2.77%
2024	20,200	62.45%	11,273	34.85%	874	2.70%

Queen Anne's County was granted home rule in 1990 under a state code.

The county has a commission form of government. The commission consists of five commissioners: one at-large and four of whom must reside in the district they represent. All of the commissioners are elected by the general population. The at-large commissioner serves as president the first year following election. County code allows for rotation of the president position thereafter.

The current Board of Commissioners was elected in the 2022 election, and serves a four-year term. The current County Commissioners are J. Patrick McLaughlin (District 2), Christopher M. Corchiarino (District 4), Philip L. Dumenil (District 3), James J. Moran (at-large), and Jack N. Wilson Jr. (District 1). The current form of five commissioners elected at large started in 2002. Prior to the 2002 election, Queen Anne's County was run by three commissioners.

== Geography ==
According to the U.S. Census Bureau, the county has a total area of 511 square miles (1,320 km^{2}), of which 372 square miles (960 km^{2}) is land and 139 square miles (360 km^{2}) (27%) is water.

=== Adjacent counties ===
- Kent County (north)
- Kent County, Delaware (east)
- Talbot County (south)
- Caroline County (southeast)
- Anne Arundel County (west)

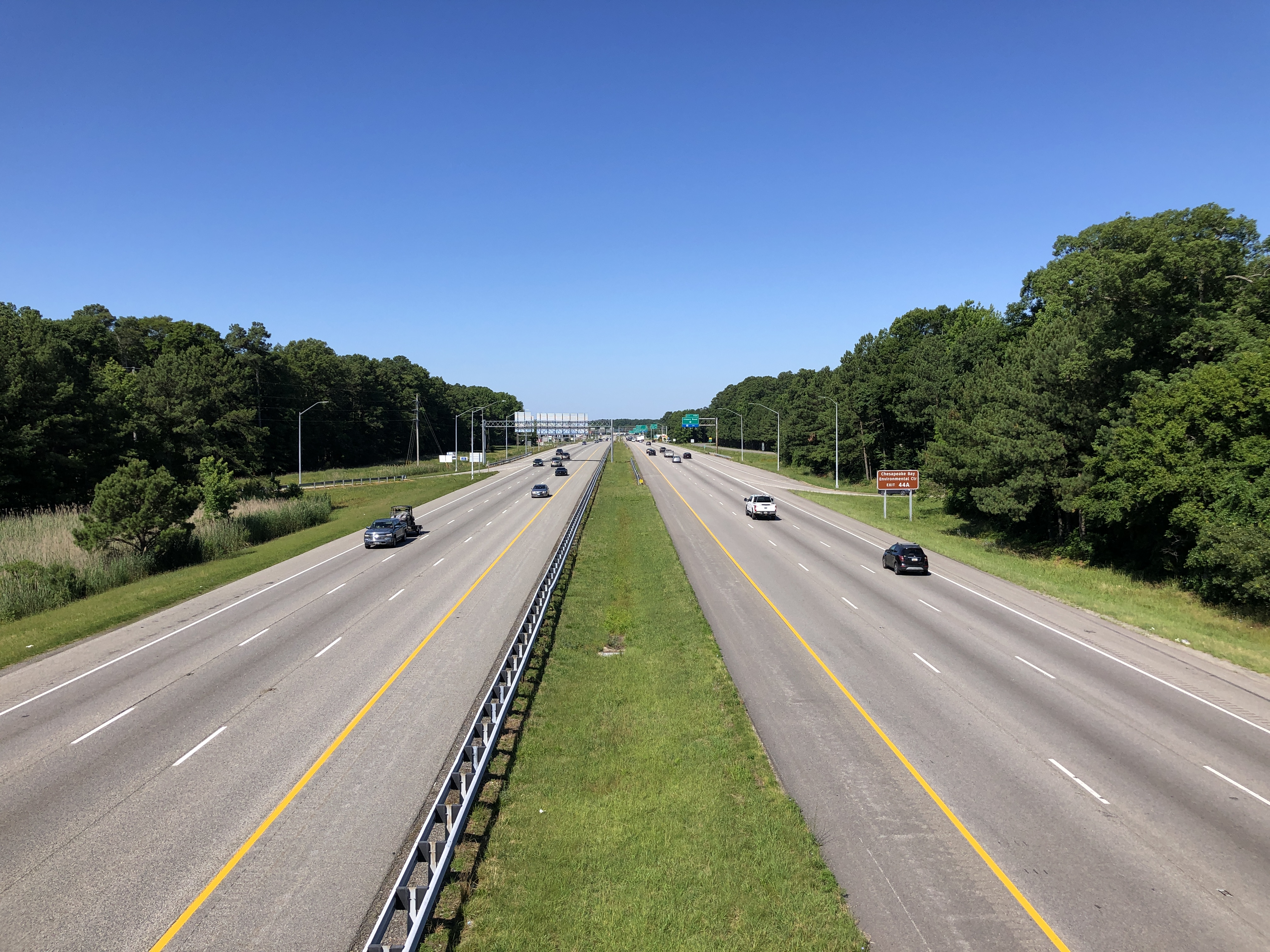
US 50 and US 301 in Queen Anne's County

=== Major roads and highways ===
- US 50
- US 301
- MD 8
- MD 18
- MD 19
- MD 213
- MD 290
- MD 300
- MD 302
- MD 303
- MD 304
- MD 305
- MD 309
- MD 313
- MD 404
- MD 405
- MD 456
- MD 481
- MD 544
- MD 552
- MD 656
- MD 662

== Demographics ==
Historical population
Census	Pop.	Note	%±
1790	15,463		—
1800	14,857		−3.9%
1810	16,648		12.1%
1820	14,952		−10.2%
1830	14,397		−3.7%
1840	12,633		−12.3%
1850	14,484		14.7%
1860	15,961		10.2%
1870	16,171		1.3%
1880	19,257		19.1%
1890	18,461		−4.1%
1900	18,364		−0.5%
1910	16,839		−8.3%
1920	16,001		−5.0%
1930	14,571		−8.9%
1940	14,476		−0.7%
1950	14,579		0.7%
1960	16,569		13.6%
1970	18,422		11.2%
1980	25,508		38.5%
1990	33,953		33.1%
2000	40,563		19.5%
2010	47,798		17.8%
2020	49,874		4.3%
2025 (est.)	54,448	▲	9.2%
U.S. Decennial Census; 1790-1960 1900-1990; 1990-2000 2010–2018

=== Racial and ethnic composition ===
Queen Anne's County, Maryland – Racial and ethnic composition Note: the US Census treats Hispanic/Latino as an ethnic category. This table excludes Latinos from the racial categories and assigns them to a separate category. Hispanics/Latinos may be of any race.
Race / Ethnicity (NH = Non-Hispanic)	Pop 1980	Pop 1990	Pop 2000	Pop 2010	Pop 2020	% 1980	% 1990	% 2000	% 2010	% 2020
White alone (NH)	21,169	29,781	35,863	41,733	41,782	82.99%	87.71%	88.41%	87.31%	83.78%
Black or African American alone (NH)	4,035	3,815	3,537	3,258	2,775	15.82%	11.24%	8.72%	6.82%	5.56%
Native American or Alaska Native alone (NH)	15	45	85	127	63	0.06%	0.13%	0.21%	0.27%	0.13%
Asian alone (NH)	42	120	229	460	587	0.16%	0.35%	0.56%	0.96%	1.18%
Native Hawaiian or Pacific Islander alone (NH)	x	x	10	12	11	x	x	0.02%	0.03%	0.02%
Other race alone (NH)	20	3	47	41	190	0.08%	0.01%	0.12%	0.09%	0.38%
Mixed race or Multiracial (NH)	x	x	348	715	1,928	x	x	0.86%	1.50%	3.87%
Hispanic or Latino (any race)	227	189	444	1,452	2,538	0.89%	0.56%	1.09%	3.04%	5.09%
Total	25,508	33,953	40,563	47,798	49,874	100.00%	100.00%	100.00%	100.00%	100.00%

=== 2020 census ===
As of the 2020 census, the county had a population of 49,874. The median age was 44.7 years. 21.6% of residents were under the age of 18 and 19.6% of residents were 65 years of age or older. For every 100 females there were 98.3 males, and for every 100 females age 18 and over there were 96.3 males age 18 and over. 41.0% of residents lived in urban areas, while 59.0% lived in rural areas.

The racial makeup of the county was 84.8% White, 5.6% Black or African American, 0.3% American Indian and Alaska Native, 1.2% Asian, 0.0% Native Hawaiian and Pacific Islander, 2.5% from some other race, and 5.5% from two or more races. Hispanic or Latino residents of any race comprised 5.1% of the population.

There were 19,240 households in the county, of which 30.2% had children under the age of 18 living with them and 20.8% had a female householder with no spouse or partner present. About 22.2% of all households were made up of individuals and 11.1% had someone living alone who was 65 years of age or older.

There were 21,274 housing units, of which 9.6% were vacant. Among occupied housing units, 82.6% were owner-occupied and 17.4% were renter-occupied. The homeowner vacancy rate was 1.7% and the rental vacancy rate was 6.7%.

=== 2010 census ===
As of the 2010 United States census, there were 47,798 people, 18,016 households, and 13,314 families living in the county. The population density was 128.5 inhabitants per square mile (49.6/km^{2}). There were 20,140 housing units at an average density of 54.2 per square mile (20.9/km^{2}). The racial makeup of the county was 88.7% white, 6.9% black or African American, 1.0% Asian, 0.3% American Indian, 1.4% from other races, and 1.7% from two or more races. Those of Hispanic or Latino origin made up 3.0% of the population. In terms of ancestry, 25.9% were German, 22.4% were Irish, 15.8% were English, 6.2% were Italian, and 6.1% were American.

Of the 18,016 households, 34.4% had children under the age of 18 living with them, 60.3% were married couples living together, 9.2% had a female householder with no husband present, 26.1% were non-families, and 20.6% of all households were made up of individuals. The average household size was 2.63 and the average family size was 3.04. The median age was 42.6 years.

The median income for a household in the county was $81,096 and the median income for a family was $89,188. Males had a median income of $57,218 versus $43,371 for females. The per capita income for the county was $35,964. About 3.8% of families and 5.5% of the population were below the poverty line, including 7.0% of those under age 18 and 6.1% of those age 65 or over.

=== 2000 census ===
As of the census of 2000, there were 40,563 people, 15,315 households, and 11,547 families living in the county. The population density was 109 people per square mile (42 people/km^{2}). There were 16,674 housing units at an average density of 45 per square mile (17/km^{2}). The racial makeup of the county was 89.05% White, 8.78% Black or African American, 0.22% Native American, 0.57% Asian, 0.02% Pacific Islander, 0.43% from other races, and 0.93% from two or more races. 1.09% of the population were Hispanic or Latino of any race. 16.9% were of German, 15.1% American, 14.6% English, 14.2% Irish and 5.3% Italian ancestry.

There were 15,315 households, out of which 33.30% had children under the age of 18 living with them, 62.20% were married couples living together, 9.50% had a female householder with no husband present, and 24.60% were non-families. 19.60% of all households were made up of individuals, and 7.90% had someone living alone who was 65 years of age or older. The average household size was 2.62 and the average family size was 2.99.

In the county, the population was spread out, with 25.40% under the age of 18, 5.80% from 18 to 24, 30.10% from 25 to 44, 25.90% from 45 to 64, and 12.90% who were 65 years of age or older. The median age was 39 years. For every 100 females, there were 99.20 males. For every 100 females age 18 and over, there were 96.80 males.

The median income for a household in the county was $57,037, and the median income for a family was $63,713. Males had a median income of $44,644 versus $30,144 for females. The per capita income for the county was $26,364. About 4.40% of families and 6.30% of the population were below the poverty line, including 7.20% of those under age 18 and 7.30% of those age 65 or over.

== Education ==
=== Public schools ===
- Kent Island High School
- Queen Anne's County High School
- Centreville Middle School
- Matapeake Middle School
- Stevensville Middle School
- Sudlersville Middle School
- Bayside Elementary School
- Centreville Elementary School
- Church Hill Elementary School
- Grasonville Elementary School
- Kennard Elementary School
- Kent Island Elementary School
- Matapeake Elementary School
- Sudlersville Elementary School
- Gunston Day School
- Wye River Upper School

=== Colleges and universities ===
- Chesapeake College

== Communities ==
=== Towns ===
- Barclay
- Centreville (county seat)
- Church Hill
- Millington (partly in Kent County)
- Queen Anne (partly in Talbot County)
- Queenstown
- Sudlersville
- Templeville (partly in Caroline County)

=== Census-designated places ===
The Census Bureau recognizes the following census-designated places in the county:

- Chester
- Grasonville
- Kent Narrows
- Kingstown
- Romancoke
- Stevensville

=== Unincorporated communities ===
- Crumpton
- Dominion
- Ingleside
- Love Point
- Matapeake
- Price
- Ruthsburg

== See also ==
- National Register of Historic Places listings in Queen Anne's County, Maryland
