= Kent Narrows, Maryland =

- CDP
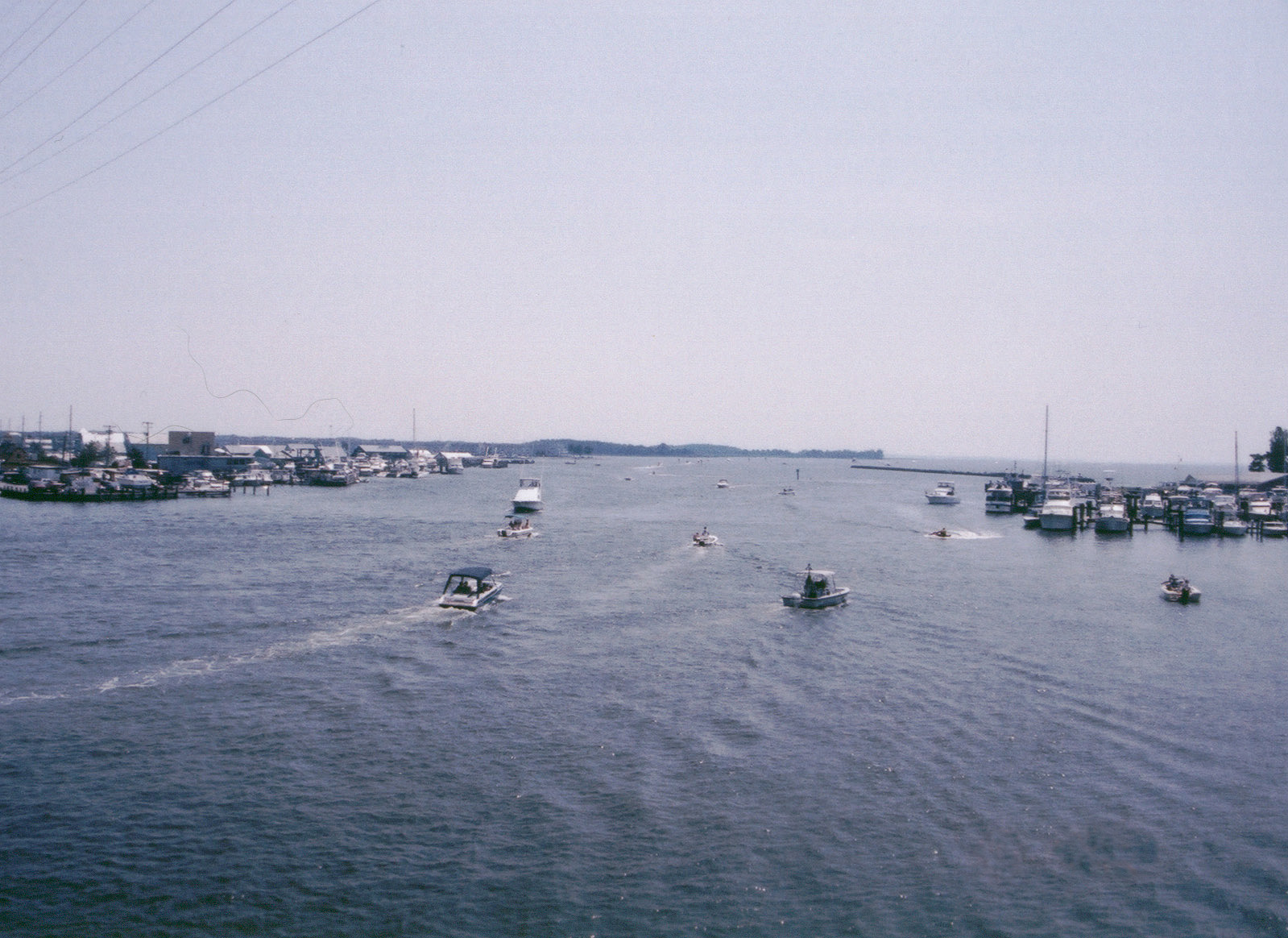
- Boaters enjoy a sunny Sunday afternoon on the Kent Narrows Channel

- Coordinates: 38°58′9″N 76°14′25″W
- Country: United States
- State: Maryland
- County: Queen Anne's

Area
  - Total: 3.22 sq mi (8.33 km^{2})
  - Land: 0.94 sq mi (2.44 km^{2})
  - Water: 2.28 sq mi (5.90 km^{2})
- Elevation: 6.6 ft (2 m)

Population (2020)
  - Total: 612
  - Density: 650.2/sq mi (251.05/km^{2})
- Time zone: UTC−5 (Eastern (EST))
  - Summer (DST): UTC−4 (EDT)
- FIPS code: 24-43725
- GNIS feature ID: 1852595

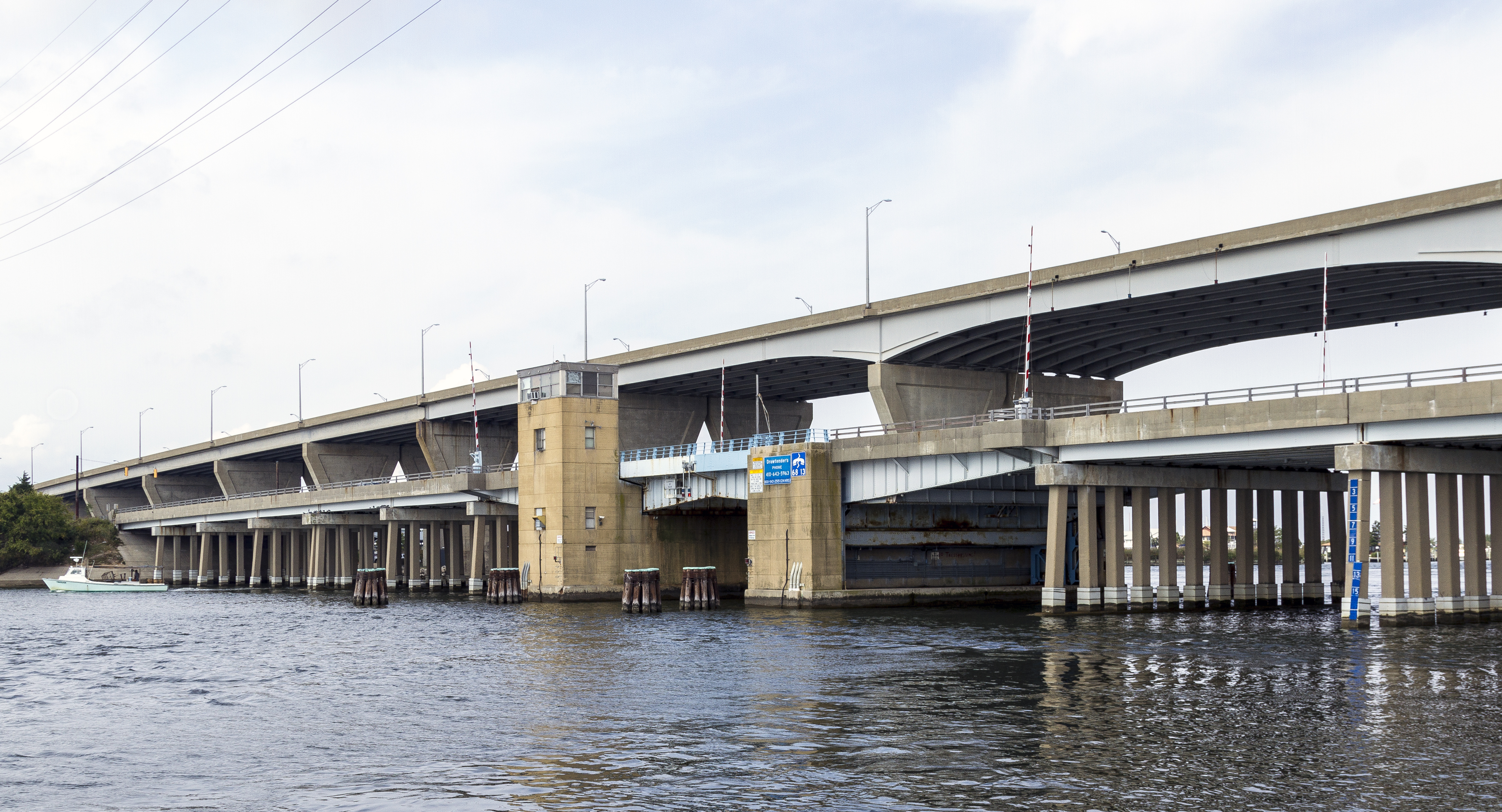
The R. Clayton Mitchell Jr. Bridge (rear) and the Waterman's Memorial Bridge (front) at Kent Narrows

Kent Narrows is a census-designated place and town in Queen Anne's County, Maryland, United States. As of the 2020 census, the town had a population of 612.

== Geography ==
Kent Narrows is located at 38°58′09″N 76°14′25″W.

According to the United States Census Bureau, the CDP has a total area of 2.6 square miles (6.7 km^{2}), of which 1.0 square mile (2.6 km^{2}) is land and 1.6 square miles (4.1 km^{2}) (62.16%) is water.

== Demographics ==
Historical population
Census	Pop.	Note	%±
2020	612		—
U.S. Decennial Census

As of the census of 2000, there were 567 people, 277 households, and 188 families residing in the CDP. The population density was 576.8 inhabitants per square mile (222.7/km^{2}). There were 358 housing units at an average density of 364.2 per square mile (140.6/km^{2}). The racial makeup of the CDP was 96.30% White, 2.82% African American, 0.18% Asian, and 0.71% from two or more races. Hispanic or Latino of any race were 1.23% of the population.

There were 277 households, out of which 10.8% had children under the age of 18 living with them, 65.3% were married couples living together, 1.8% had a female householder with no husband present, and 31.8% were non-families. 24.9% of all households were made up of individuals, and 7.6% had someone living alone who was 65 years of age or older. The average household size was 2.05 and the average family size was 2.38.

In the CDP, the population was spread out, with 9.7% under the age of 18, 2.8% from 18 to 24, 19.2% from 25 to 44, 47.8% from 45 to 64, and 20.5% who were 65 years of age or older. The median age was 53 years. For every 100 females, there were 96.2 males. For every 100 females age 18 and over, there were 92.5 males.

The median income for a household in the CDP was $95,239, and the median income for a family was $99,467. Males had a median income of $83,471 versus $42,813 for females. The per capita income for the CDP was $48,899. None of the families and 4.8% of the population were living below the poverty line, including no under eighteens and 3.3% of those over 64.
