= Chester, Maryland =

- CDP
- Coordinates: 38°58′19″N 76°17′17″W
- Country: United States
- State: Maryland
- County: Queen Anne's

Area
  - Total: 6.98 sq mi (18.09 km^{2})
  - Land: 5.24 sq mi (13.56 km^{2})
  - Water: 1.75 sq mi (4.52 km^{2})
- Elevation: 6.6 ft (2 m)

Population (2020)
  - Total: 5,003
  - Density: 955.3/sq mi (368.84/km^{2})
- Time zone: UTC−5 (Eastern (EST))
  - Summer (DST): UTC−4 (EDT)
- ZIP code: 21619
- Area code: 410
- FIPS code: 24-16125
- GNIS feature ID: 0597229

Chester is a census-designated place on Kent Island in Queen Anne's County, Maryland, United States. The population was 3,723 at the 2000 census.

== Geography ==
Chester is located at 38°58′19″N 76°17′17″W (38.971907, −76.288045).

According to the United States Census Bureau, the CDP has a total area of 7.0 square miles (18 km^{2}), of which 5.3 square miles (14 km^{2}) is land and 1.8 square miles (4.7 km^{2}) (24.89%) is water.

== Demographics ==
Historical population
| Census | Pop. | Note | %± |
|---|---|---|---|
| 2020 | 5,003 | | — |
U.S. Decennial Census

=== 2020 census ===
As of the 2020 census, Chester had a population of 5,003. The median age was 48.2 years. 18.1% of residents were under the age of 18 and 21.3% of residents were 65 years of age or older. For every 100 females there were 96.9 males, and for every 100 females age 18 and over there were 91.9 males age 18 and over.

94.0% of residents lived in urban areas, while 6.0% lived in rural areas.

There were 2,208 households in Chester, of which 22.5% had children under the age of 18 living in them. Of all households, 46.6% were married-couple households, 15.6% were households with a male householder and no spouse or partner present, and 30.2% were households with a female householder and no spouse or partner present. About 29.7% of all households were made up of individuals and 13.1% had someone living alone who was 65 years of age or older.

There were 2,475 housing units, of which 10.8% were vacant. The homeowner vacancy rate was 2.3% and the rental vacancy rate was 8.1%.

Racial composition as of the 2020 census
| Race | Number | Percent |
|---|---|---|
| White | 4,156 | 83.1% |
| Black or African American | 285 | 5.7% |
| American Indian and Alaska Native | 25 | 0.5% |
| Asian | 97 | 1.9% |
| Native Hawaiian and Other Pacific Islander | 1 | 0.0% |
| Some other race | 135 | 2.7% |
| Two or more races | 304 | 6.1% |
| Hispanic or Latino (of any race) | 284 | 5.7% |

=== 2000 census ===
As of the 2000 census, there were 3,723 people, 1,567 households, and 1,037 families residing in the CDP. The population density was 705.3 inhabitants per square mile (272.3/km^{2}). There were 1,723 housing units at an average density of 326.4 per square mile (126.0/km^{2}). The racial makeup of the CDP was 89.61% White, 7.06% African American, 0.13% Native American, 1.02% Asian, 0.05% Pacific Islander, 0.59% from other races, and 1.53% from two or more races. Hispanic or Latino of any race were 1.32% of the population.

There were 1,567 households, out of which 28.1% had children under the age of 18 living with them, 50.4% were married couples living together, 11.8% had a female householder with no husband present, and 33.8% were non-families. 27.1% of all households were made up of individuals, and 10.2% had someone living alone who was 65 years of age or older. The average household size was 2.38 and the average family size was 2.87.

In the CDP, the population was spread out, with 23.1% under the age of 18, 6.6% from 18 to 24, 30.3% from 25 to 44, 26.0% from 45 to 64, and 14.0% who were 65 years of age or older. The median age was 39 years. For every 100 females, there were 94.3 males. For every 100 females age 18 and over, there were 90.8 males.

The median income for a household in the CDP was $56,558, and the median income for a family was $60,195. Males had a median income of $42,289 versus $30,495 for females. The per capita income for the CDP was $27,789. About 3.3% of families and 4.9% of the population were below the poverty line, including 7.5% of those under age 18 and 3.7% of those age 65 or over.

== Notable person ==
- Charles Willson Peale, painter, soldier and naturalist
