= National Register of Historic Places listings in Queen Anne's County, Maryland =

Location of Queen Anne's County in Maryland

This is a list of the National Register of Historic Places listings in Queen Anne's County, Maryland.

This is intended to be a complete list of the properties and districts on the National Register of Historic Places in Queen Anne's County, Maryland, United States. Latitude and longitude coordinates are provided for many National Register properties and districts; these locations may be seen together in a map.

There are 41 properties and districts listed on the National Register in the county.

Contents: Counties in Maryland
Allegany - Anne Arundel - Baltimore (city) - Baltimore County - Calvert - Caroline - Carroll - Cecil - Charles - Dorchester - Frederick - Garrett - Harford - Howard - Kent - Montgomery - Prince George's - Queen Anne's - Somerset - St. Mary's - Talbot - Washington - Wicomico - Worcester

This National Park Service list is complete through NPS recent listings posted April 24, 2026.

== Current listings ==
	Name on the Register	Image	Date listed	Location	City or town	Description
1	Bachelor's Hope	Bachelor's Hope	May 3, 1984 (#84001855)	Maryland Route 18; 39°02′01″N 76°06′18″W	Centreville vicinity	
2	Bishopton	Bishopton	September 12, 1985 (#85002194)	Pinder Hill Rd. 39°09′35″N 75°58′26″W	Church Hill vicinity	
3	Bloomingdale	Bloomingdale	October 18, 1972 (#72001457)	Bloomingdale Rd. and U.S. Route 50; 38°58′21″N 76°07′01″W	Queenstown vicinity	
4	Bowlingly	Bowlingly	August 21, 1972 (#72001458)	Off Maryland Route 18; 38°59′36″N 76°09′30″W	Queenstown	
5	Captain's Houses	Captain's Houses	November 17, 1980 (#80001830)	Corsica St. 39°03′07″N 76°04′32″W	Centreville	
6	Centreville Armory	Centreville Armory	September 25, 1985 (#85002666)	S. Commerce St. 39°02′30″N 76°04′05″W	Centreville	
7	Centreville Historic District	Centreville Historic District	November 13, 2004 (#04001218)	Roughly bounded by the Corsica River, Chesterfield Ave, Liberty St, Banjo Ln, Railroad Ave, town limits, and Mill Stream; 39°02′45″N 76°04′02″W	Centreville	
8	Chester Hall	Chester Hall	January 18, 1980 (#80001831)	1 mile southeast of Chestertown on Maryland Route 213; 39°12′17″N 76°02′43″W	Chestertown vicinity	
9	Christ Church	Christ Church	July 24, 1979 (#79003268)	Maryland Route 18; 38°58′50″N 76°18′52″W	Stevensville	
10	Churchill Theatre-Community Building	Churchill Theatre-Community Building	September 8, 2000 (#00001051)	Maryland Route 19; 39°08′31″N 75°59′06″W	Church Hill	
11	Jackson Collins House	Jackson Collins House	December 13, 2000 (#00001503)	201 S. Commerce St. 39°02′34″N 76°03′58″W	Centreville	
12	Content	Content	February 13, 1986 (#86000256)	Maryland Route 305 near Tanyard Rd. 39°02′30″N 76°01′17″W	Centreville vicinity	
13	Cray House	Cray House	May 9, 1983 (#83002960)	Cockey's Lane; 38°58′53″N 76°18′56″W	Stevensville	
14	Delaware Boundary Markers		February 18, 1975 (#75002101)	Boundary line dividing Delaware from Maryland and Pennsylvania	Multiple	Extends into Delaware and southeastern Pennsylvania.
15	Dudley's Chapel	Dudley's Chapel	November 15, 1979 (#79003124)	Southwest of Sudlersville off Maryland Route 300; 39°10′56″N 75°53′33″W	Sudlersville vicinity	
16	John Embert Farm	John Embert Farm	June 22, 1980 (#80001832)	Southeast of Millington on Baxter Rd., 0.6 miles east of Peters Comer Rd. 39°13′30″N 75°48′40″W	Millington vicinity	
17	Female Seminary	Female Seminary	December 10, 2003 (#03001266)	205-207 S. Commerce St. 39°02′32″N 76°03′59″W	Centreville	
18	Friendship	Friendship	July 15, 1994 (#94000727)	200 Friendship Manor Dr. 38°57′12″N 76°20′43″W	Stevensville	
19	Hawkins Pharsalia	Hawkins Pharsalia	December 20, 1984 (#84000458)	Maryland Route 304; 39°01′02″N 75°55′06″W	Ruthsburg	
20	Keating House	Keating House	October 28, 1999 (#99001281)	208 S. Liberty St. 39°02′35″N 76°04′05″W	Centreville	
21	Kennersley	Kennersley	May 19, 1983 (#83002961)	Clabber Hill Rd. 39°08′46″N 76°01′58″W	Church Hill vicinity	
22	Lansdowne	Lansdowne	June 7, 1984 (#84001858)	Maryland Route 305; 39°02′49″N 75°59′26″W	Centreville vicinity	
23	Legg's Dependence	Legg's Dependence	November 8, 2003 (#03001116)	0200 Long Creek Court; 38°55′13″N 76°20′46″W	Stevensville vicinity	
24	Lexon	Lexon	May 4, 1990 (#90000726)	Corsica Neck Rd. southwest of Earle Cove; 39°03′16″N 76°05′15″W	Centreville vicinity	
25	Mattapax	Mattapax	December 10, 1998 (#98001498)	106 Shipping Creek Rd. 38°54′40″N 76°20′54″W	Stevensville vicinity	
26	MYSTERY (log canoe)		September 18, 1985 (#85002250)	Round Top Rd. 39°12′29″N 76°02′16″W	Kingstown	
27	Capt. John H. Ozmon Store	Capt. John H. Ozmon Store	February 14, 1985 (#85000277)	Centreville Wharf; 39°03′12″N 76°04′28″W	Centreville	
28	Readbourne	Readbourne	April 11, 1973 (#73002134)	5.4 miles (8.7 km) northwest of Centreville; 39°07′38″N 76°05′26″W	Centreville vicinity	
29	Reed's Creek Farm	Reed's Creek Farm	July 7, 1975 (#75002106)	West of Centreville on Wright's Neck Rd. off Maryland Route 18; 39°03′05″N 76°09′12″W	Centreville vicinity	
30	St. Andrew's Episcopal Chapel	St. Andrew's Episcopal Chapel	September 7, 1984 (#84001853)	Church St. and Maple Ave. 39°11′06″N 75°51′30″W	Sudlersville	
31	St. Luke's Church	St. Luke's Church	November 23, 1977 (#77001505)	Junction of Maryland Routes 19 and 213; 39°08′32″N 75°59′11″W	Church Hill	
32	St. Peter's Church	St. Peter's Church	March 10, 1980 (#80001833)	Southeast of Queenstown on U.S. Route 50; 38°58′41″N 76°08′03″W	Queenstown vicinity	
33	Salem School	Salem School	August 12, 2025 (#100012113)	3302 Church Hill Road; 39°07′05″N 76°01′04″W	Church Hill	
34	Starr Church	Starr Church	March 1, 2024 (#100009979)	1504 Starr Road; 38°58′31″N 76°00′26″W	Centreville vicinity	
35	Stevensville Bank	Stevensville Bank	January 3, 1985 (#85000020)	Love Point Rd. 38°58′55″N 76°18′53″W	Stevensville	
36	Stevensville Historic District	Stevensville Historic District	September 11, 1986 (#86002333)	Maryland Route 18 and Love Point Rd. 38°58′53″N 76°18′49″W	Stevensville	
37	Stratton	Stratton	December 18, 2003 (#03001294)	3102 Ruthsburg Rd. 39°01′41″N 75°53′51″W	Centreville vicinity	
38	Thomas House	Thomas House	May 13, 1976 (#76002150)	1.8 miles northeast of Ruthsburg on Maryland Route 304; 39°00′54″N 75°55′53″W	Ruthsburg	
39	Wilton	Wilton	December 12, 1977 (#77001506)	North of Wye Mills on Maryland Route 213; 38°56′58″N 76°04′37″W	Wye Mills	
40	Wye Hall	Wye Hall	November 2, 2015 (#15000759)	505 Wye Hall Dr. 38°53′20″N 76°07′07″W	Queenstown	
41	Wye Mill	Wye Mill	April 9, 1985 (#85000717)	Maryland Route 662; 38°56′29″N 76°04′53″W	Wye Mills	Extends into Talbot County

== See also ==
- List of National Historic Landmarks in Maryland
- National Register of Historic Places listings in Maryland
