= Maryland Route 304 =

State highway in Maryland, United States

Maryland Route 304
- Maryland Route 304 highlighted in red

Route information
- Maintained by MDSHA and Town of Centreville
- Length: 15.23 mi (24.51 km)
- Existed: 1927–present

Major junctions
- West end: Spider Web Road near Centreville
- MD 213 in Centreville; US 301 near Centreville; MD 481 in Ruthsburg; MD 405 near Bridgetown
- East end: MD 312 in Bridgetown

Location
- Country: United States
- State: Maryland
- Counties: Queen Anne's, Caroline

Highway system
- Maryland highway system; Interstate; US; State; Scenic Byways
← MD 303	→ MD 305

Maryland Route 304 (MD 304) is a state highway in the U.S. state of Maryland. The highway runs 15.23 miles (24.51 km) from Spider Web Road near Centreville east to MD 312 in Bridgetown. MD 304 connects Centreville with U.S. Route 301 (US 301) and several small settlements in central Queen Anne's County and northern Caroline County, including Ruthsburg and Bridgetown. The first sections of modern MD 304 were improved in the 1910s, but much of the highway from Centreville to Ruthsburg was constructed from the mid-1930s to the early 1940s. The part of the highway west of Centreville was constructed as Maryland Route 606 and became part of MD 304 in 1950. Since the 1950s, the highway through Centreville has been municipally maintained. MD 304 was extended east to MD 405 and replaced that route to Bridgetown in the 1960s. The US 301 junction became a superstreet intersection in 2011 and a double-roundabout partial cloverleaf interchange in 2017.

== Route description ==
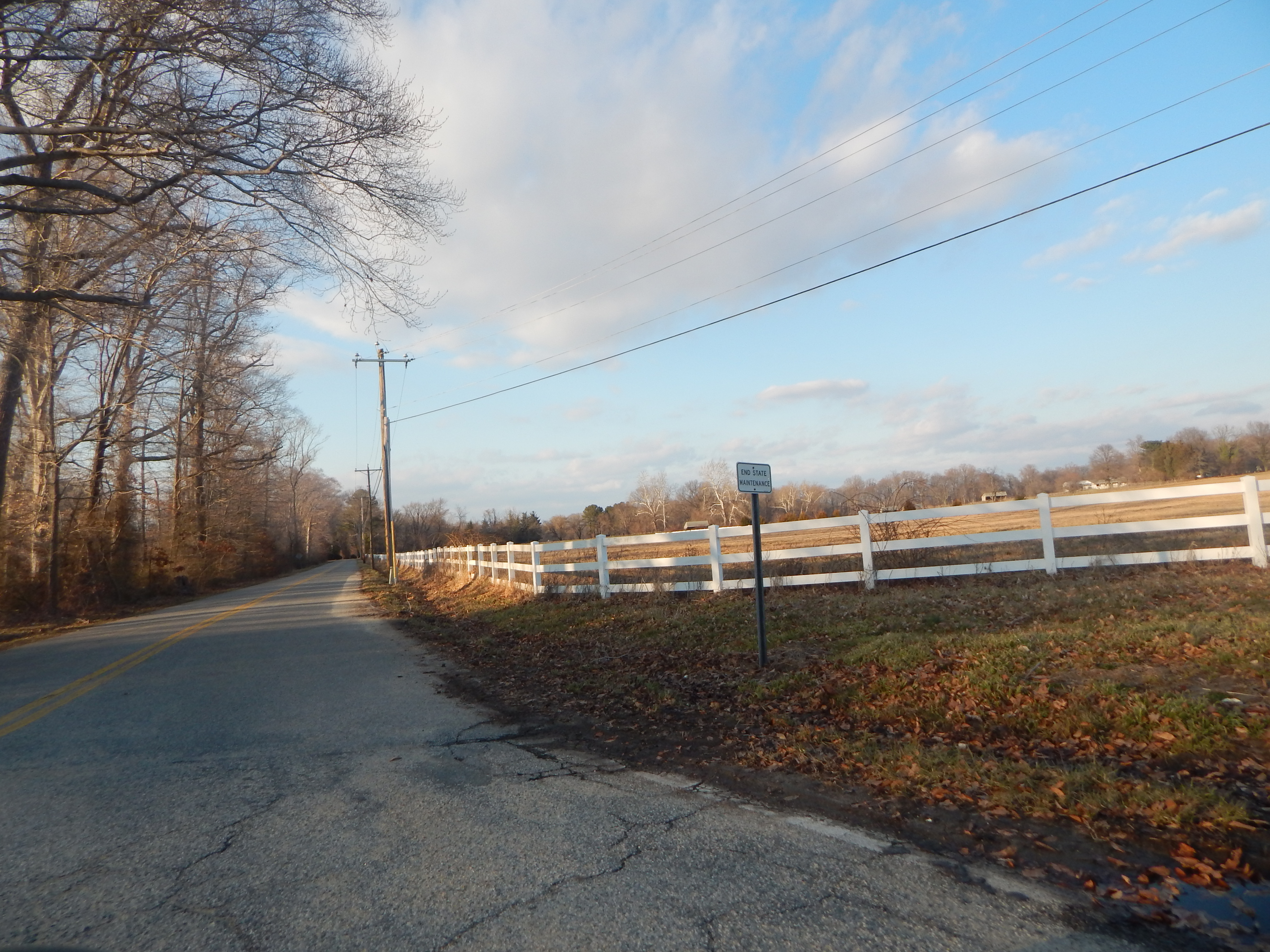
MD 304's western terminus, signed along Corsica Neck Road

MD 304 begins at the intersection of Corsica Neck Road and Spider Web Road on the Corsica Neck peninsula west of Centreville. The highway heads east as two-lane undivided Corsica Neck Road past the historic home Lexon and crosses Earle Creek. MD 304 crosses the Old Mill Stream branch of the Corsica River to enter the town of Centreville, where most of the highway is municipally maintained. At the east end of the bridge, the route passes between the historic Captain's Houses and the Capt. John H. Ozmon Store in the former wharf area of Centreville. MD 304 follows Chesterfield Avenue through the Centreville Historic District. At the west end of downtown, the eastbound route continues seamlessly onto Water Street. While on the one-way eastbound street to the south of the Queen Anne's County Courthouse, the highway intersects MD 213, which follows the one-way pair of Liberty Street southbound and Commerce Street northbound. Westbound MD 304 traffic follows Broadway one block to the north to head toward the west end of town.

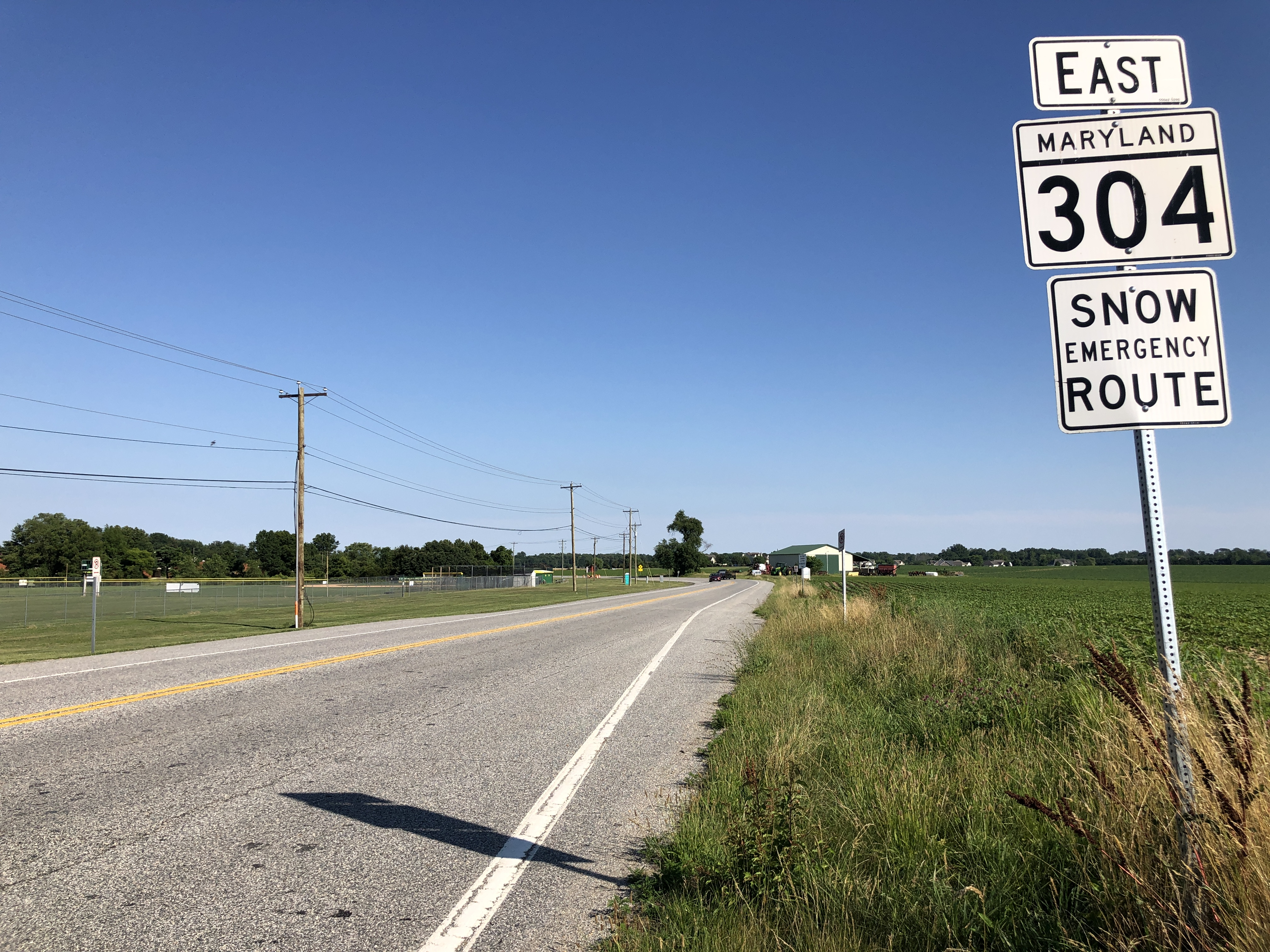
MD 304 eastbound leaving Centreville

East of Commerce Street, MD 304 becomes bidirectional again. The highway's name changes to Railroad Avenue at Tilghman Avenue and to Ruthsburg Road at Kidwell Avenue, where state maintenance resumes. MD 304 leaves the town of Centreville as it passes southwest of Queen Anne's County High School. The highway continues through a double-roundabout partial cloverleaf interchange with US 301 (Blue Star Memorial Highway). MD 304 heads southeast toward Ruthsburg, where the highway meets the northern end of MD 481 (Damsontown Road). The route continues east past the historic Thomas House and Hawkins Pharsalia on either side of the road's bridge across German Branch. MD 304 meets the eastern end of MD 405 (Price Station Road) opposite the historic home Stratton. The highway crosses Mason Branch of Tuckahoe Creek into Caroline County, where it follows Bridgetown Road to its eastern terminus at MD 312 (Oakland Road) in Bridgetown.

== History ==
The first two improved sections of what is now MD 304 were county-constructed highways built with state aid. Caroline County built the two-span reinforced concrete Mason Branch bridge and a 9-foot-wide (2.7 m) shell road east through Bridgetown in 1914. Queen Anne's County paved Water Street as a 14-foot-wide (4.3 m) concrete road from west of Commerce Street to the Centreville Branch of the Philadelphia, Baltimore and Washington Railroad and built a 9-foot-wide (2.7 m) shell road from the railroad to about 2 miles (3.2 km) east of downtown between 1915 and 1921. The Maryland State Roads Commission extended the concrete road from Water Street west to Centreville Landing, the wharf serving the county seat, in 1924 and 1925. The state reconstructed the 1910s county-built shell road east from the railroad as a macadam road in two segments in 1934 and 1935. Another 1-mile-long (1.6 km) section was built east from the end of the macadam reconstruction starting in 1936, and another 1.5-mile-long (2.4 km) segment was constructed by 1938. The Maryland State Roads Commission extended MD 304 to MD 481 at Ruthsburg through a February 26, 1942, resolution after the 2-mile-long (3.2 km) county section west from Ruthsburg was improved to state standards. The portion of MD 304 east 2 miles (3.2 km) from the Centreville town limit was reconstructed between 1946 and 1948.

Maryland Route 606
- Location: Centreville
- Length: 2.27 mi (3.65 km)
- Existed: 1935–1950

A 2.27-mile-long (3.65 km) macadam road was built west from Centreville Landing along Corsica Neck in 1935, and a new bridge was built across the Old Mill Stream Branch of the Corsica River in 1936 and 1937. Corsica Neck Road was designated MD 606 until the MD 304 designation was extended west from Centreville Landing in 1950. Before that extension, the portions of MD 606 from its MD 304 junction west to the town limit and MD 304 itself in Centreville were resurfaced in 1949. On August 13, 1952, the town of Centreville agreed to municipally maintain Chesterfield Avenue and the portion of Water Street west of Liberty Street in exchange for the roads commission taking over maintenance of Liberty Street so that street could be the southbound direction of a US 213 one-way pair. After the state resurfaced the portion of Water Street east of Liberty Street and Railroad Avenue east to the town limit and reconstructed the intersection of Commerce and Water streets, the town agreed to take over the remainder of MD 304 in town through a June 26, 1958 agreement.

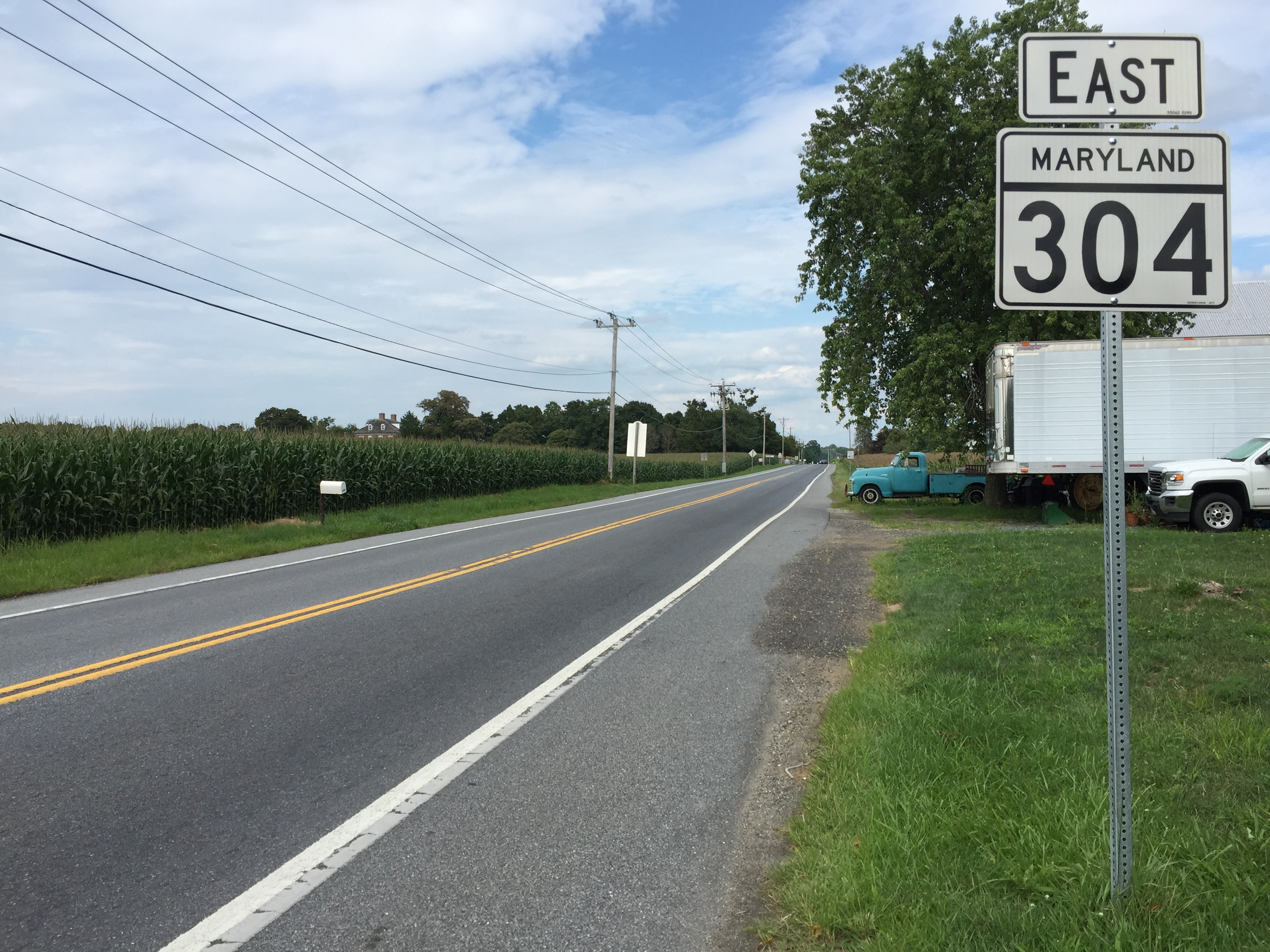
View east along MD 304 at MD 481 in Ruthsburg

The Maryland State Roads Commission brought the portion of MD 304 from MD 481 to MD 405 into the state highway system through a February 19, 1962, memorandum of action. MD 304 from the current MD 405 intersection to the county line had been brought into the state system as an extension of MD 405 in the same resolution that extended MD 304 to Ruthsburg in 1942. The state and Caroline County agreed to bring Bridgetown Road from the county line to MD 312 into the state system as an extension of MD 405 through an August 22, 1957, resolution. MD 304 replaced MD 405 from the MD 405 intersection to MD 312 in 1969. That same year and extending into 1970, the highway was reconstructed from the east town limit of Centreville to US 301. MD 304 was resurfaced with bituminous concrete from US 301 to MD 481 in 1972 and from MD 481 to Mason Branch in 1977. The 1930s Corsica River bridge was replaced with the current steel beam bridge between 1984 and 1986. Water Street from west of Liberty Street to Commerce Street was made one way in 1997 or 1998.

MD 304A was designated along the portion of MD 304 east of US 301 when the superstreet intersection between the two highways was installed in 2011. The Maryland Department of Transportation built a dumbbell interchange to replace the superstreet intersection with US 301. The interchange project constructed a bridge carrying MD 304 over US 301. This interchange was the top transportation priority for Queen Anne's County for years and was pushed for by students at Queen Anne's County High School after a student at the school was killed in an accident at the intersection in 2010. A groundbreaking ceremony was held on September 23, 2014, with several Queen Anne's County commissioners and representatives from state government in attendance. The interchange opened to traffic on August 15, 2017. As a result of the construction of the interchange with US 301, MD 304A was once again combined with MD 304.

== Junction list ==
County	Location	mi	km	Destinations	Notes
Queen Anne's		0.00	0.00	Corsica Neck Road west / Spider Web Road south	Western terminus
Queen Anne's	Centreville	3.21	5.17	MD 213 south (Liberty Street) – Wye Mills	
Queen Anne's	Centreville	3.28	5.28	MD 213 north (Commerce Street) – Church Hill	
Queen Anne's		5.78	9.30	US 301 (Blue Star Memorial Highway) – Wilmington, Bay Bridge	Double-roundabout partial cloverleaf interchange
Queen Anne's	Ruthsburg	10.00	16.09	MD 481 south (Damsontown Road) – Tuckahoe State Park, Denton	Northern terminus of MD 481
Queen Anne's		13.86	22.31	MD 405 west (Price Station Road) – Price, Church Hill	Eastern terminus of MD 405
Caroline	Bridgetown	15.24	24.53	MD 312 (Oakland Road) to MD 313 / Bridgetown Road east – Ridgely	Eastern terminus
1.000 mi = 1.609 km; 1.000 km = 0.621 mi
