= Bachelor's Hope =

Bachelor's Hope may refer to:

- Bachelor's Hope (Centreville, Maryland), listed on the NRHP in Maryland
- Bachelor's Hope (Chaptico, Maryland), listed on the NRHP in Maryland
