= Maryland Route 305 =

State highway in Maryland, United States

Maryland Route 305
- Hope Road
- Maryland Route 305 highlighted in red

Route information
- Maintained by MDSHA
- Length: 5.08 mi (8.18 km)
- Existed: 1927–present

Major junctions
- West end: MD 213 in Centreville
- US 301 at Carville
- East end: Dean Road / Hayden Road at Hope

Location
- Country: United States
- State: Maryland
- Counties: Queen Anne's

Highway system
- Maryland highway system; Interstate; US; State; Scenic Byways
← MD 304	→ MD 306

Maryland Route 305 (MD 305) is a state highway in the U.S. state of Maryland. Known as Hope Road, the highway runs 5.08 miles (8.18 km) from MD 213 in Centreville east to an intersection with Dean Road and Hayden Road at Hope east of its intersection with U.S. Route 301 (US 301) in central Queen Anne's County. MD 305 was constructed in the early 1910s and early 1920s. The highway was planned to extend to Ingleside, but only one segment of that extension was built at the Ingleside end in the mid-1940s. That disjoint part of MD 305 was removed from the state highway system in the early 1960s.

== Route description ==
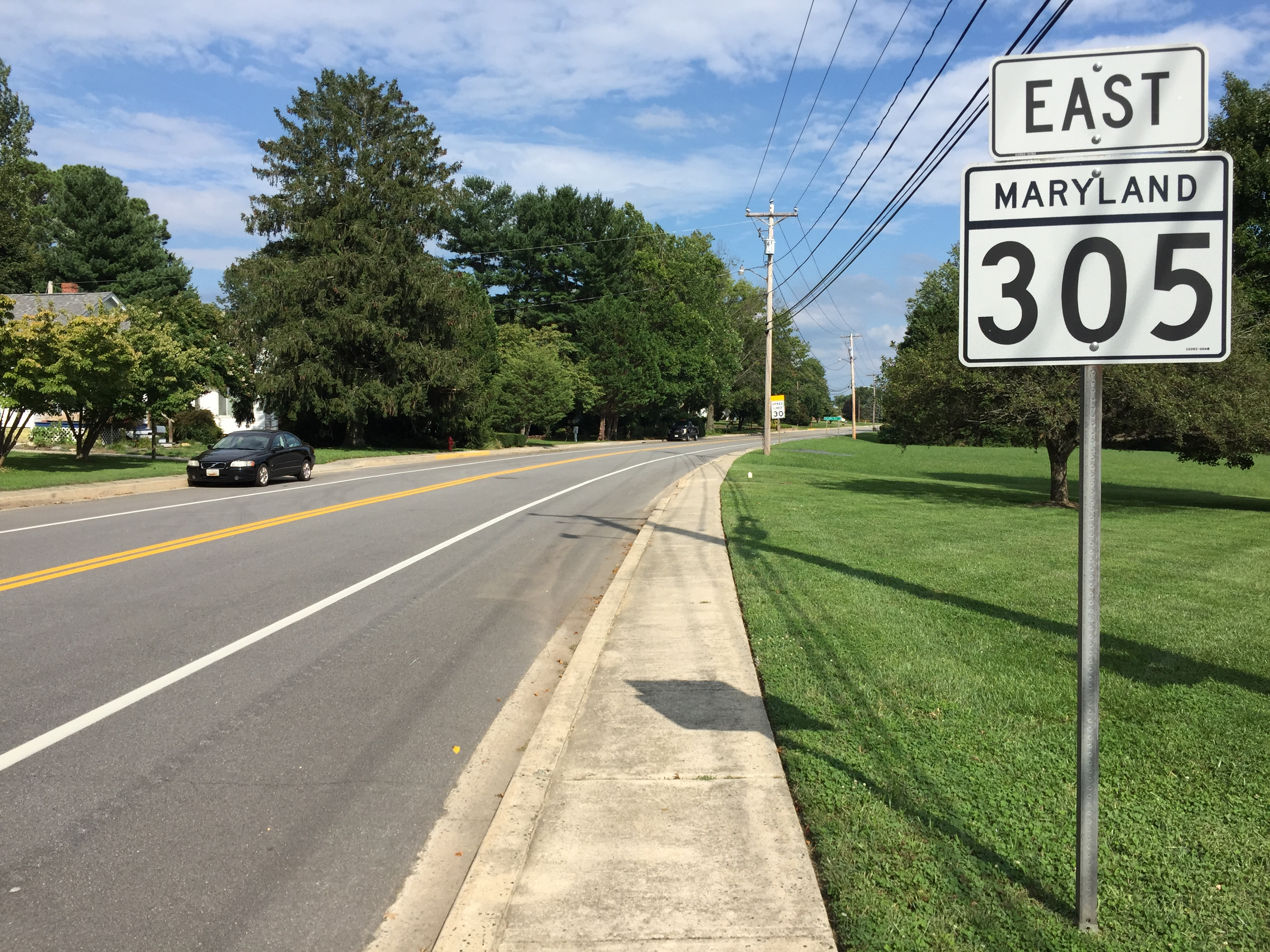
View east along MD 305 at MD 213 in Centreville

MD 305 begins at MD 213 (Church Hill Road) on the north side of the town of Centreville. The highway heads east as two-lane undivided Hope Road, which passes the historic home Content and crosses Three Bridges Branch. MD 305 meets US 301 (Blue Star Memorial Highway) at an acute superstreet intersection; traffic on MD 305 that wishes to continue on that route must turn right onto US 301, make a U-turn, and turn right again to continue on the highway. Immediately to the east of the US 301 junction, the highway crosses the Centreville Branch of the Northern Line of the Maryland and Delaware Railroad at-grade at the hamlet of Carville. MD 305 passes the historic home Lansdowne on its way to the hamlet of Hope, where the state highway ends at an intersection with Dean Road and Hayden Road. Hope Road continues east as a county highway toward MD 405 at Roe.

== History ==
Queen Anne's County constructed with state aid a 9-foot-wide (2.7 m) macadam road from the Centreville Branch of the Philadelphia, Baltimore and Washington Railroad at Carville east to Hope by 1915. The Maryland State Roads Commission built a 15-foot-wide (4.6 m) concrete road in two sections from Centreville to Carville in 1922 and 1923. MD 305 in the town of Centreville was resurfaced in 1949, and the route from Centreville to the US 301 intersection was reconstructed in 1973 and 1974. The highway's superstreet intersection with US 301 was built in 2017 as part of the contract to build the MD 304–US 301 interchange to the south.

In 1946, Queen Anne's County requested funds for the 3-year post-war construction program to be applied to the 5.5-mile-long (8.9 km) road from Hope to Ingleside. The county specifically requested the 0.88-mile-long (1.42 km) segment southwest from MD 19 at Ingleside toward Roe be funded for construction during the first year of the program. After the Ingleside segment was constructed with a sand bituminous mix surface in 1946, the highway was proposed to be designated MD 526. However, the following year the Maryland State Roads Commission brought the highway into the state highway system as a segment of MD 305, and additional segments of the Hope–Ingleside highway would be brought into the state highway system as they were completed. The state never did construct additional segments of the Hope–Ingleside road; the roads commission transferred MD 305B from state to county maintenance through a February 19, 1962, memorandum of action.

== Junction list ==
The entire route is in Queen Anne's County.

Location	mi	km	Destinations	Notes
Centreville	0.00	0.00	MD 213 (Church Hill Road) – Centreville, Chestertown	Western terminus
Carville	2.92	4.70	US 301 (Blue Star Memorial Highway) – Bay Bridge, Wilmington	Superstreet intersection
Hope	5.08	8.18	Dean Road south / Hayden Road north / Hope Road east	Eastern terminus
1.000 mi = 1.609 km; 1.000 km = 0.621 mi
