= The Centreville Times =

Newspaper in Centerville, Maryland, US

Various newspapers have been known as The Centreville Times.

Centreville, Maryland has had two newspapers called the Centreville Times. The first was a weekly publication whose full title was the Centreville Times & Eastern Shore Advertiser (later the Centreville Times and Eastern Shore Publick Advertiser), which was published from 1822 onwards. The second was a weekly publication that was later to become the Centreville Observer, which was published until 1864.

The 1822 Centreville Times was the first newspaper to be published in Queen Anne's County.
