= Readbourne =

Historic house in Maryland, United States

- U.S. National Register of Historic Places
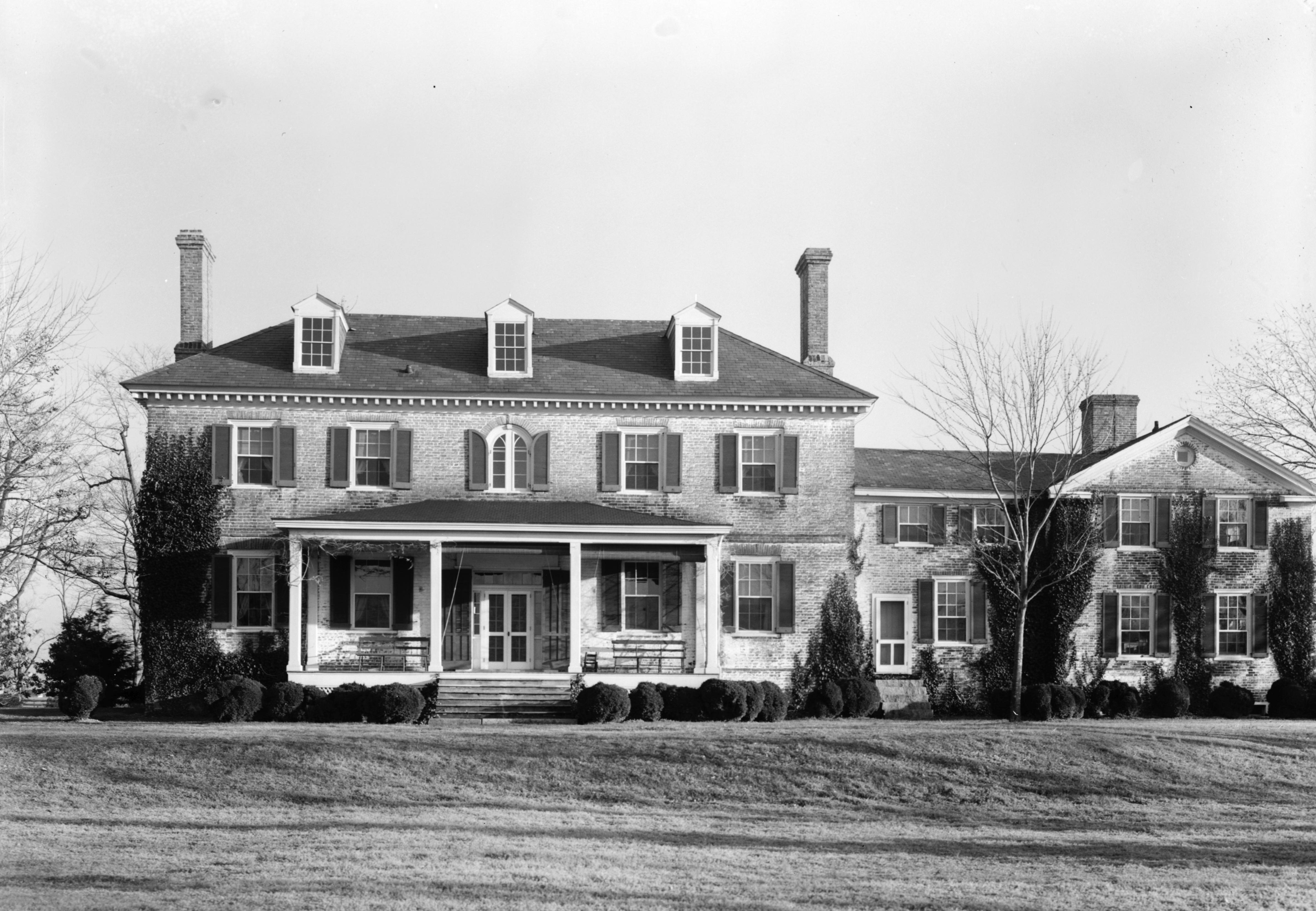
- Front of the house

- Location within Maryland Location within the United States
- Location: Land's End Road, Centreville, Maryland
- Coordinates: 39°7′38″N 76°5′26″W
- Area: 212 acres (86 ha)
- Built: 1791
- Built by: Hollyday, James, I; Hollyday, James, III
- Architectural style: Georgian
- NRHP reference No.: 73002134
- Added to NRHP: April 11, 1973

Readbourne is a historic home on the Chester River located at Centreville, Queen Anne's County, Maryland, United States. It is a five-part Georgian brick house: the center block was built in the early 1730s; the south wing in 1791; and the north wing in 1948. The central part of the house is the most significant, being a T-shaped, two-story brick building with a hip roof, measuring 60 feet (18 m) by 23 feet 6 inches (7.16 m). All of the brick walls are laid in Flemish bond.

The house was listed on the National Register of Historic Places in 1973. It was built by James Hollyday, a prominent politician for the Province of Maryland. It was once owned by William Fahnestock Jr. of the New York banking family.

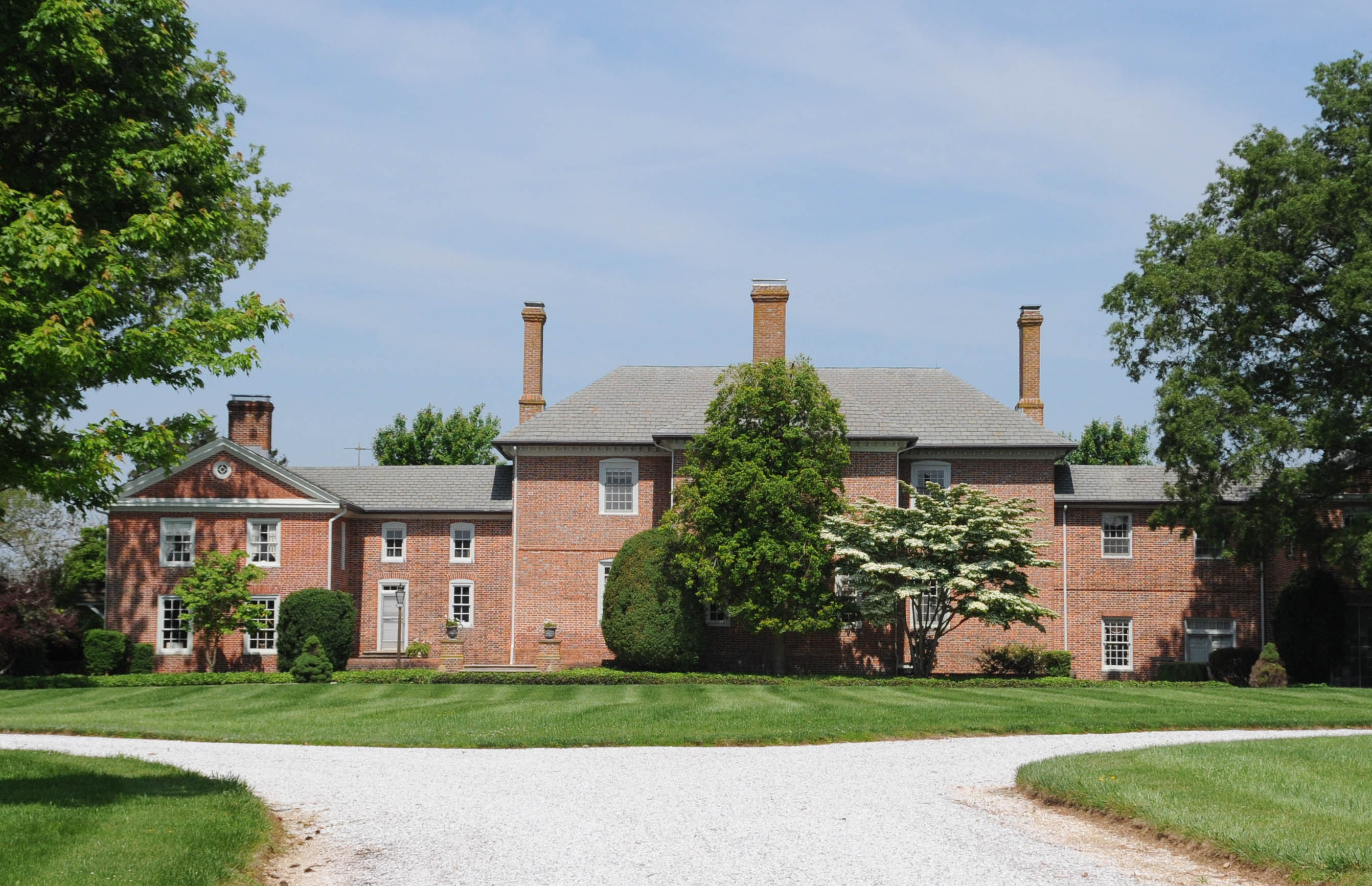
Readbourne in 2016

== See also ==
- National Register of Historic Places listings in Queen Anne's County, Maryland
- Ratcliffe Manor
- Wye House
