= Captain's Houses =

Historic houses in Maryland, United States

- U.S. National Register of Historic Places
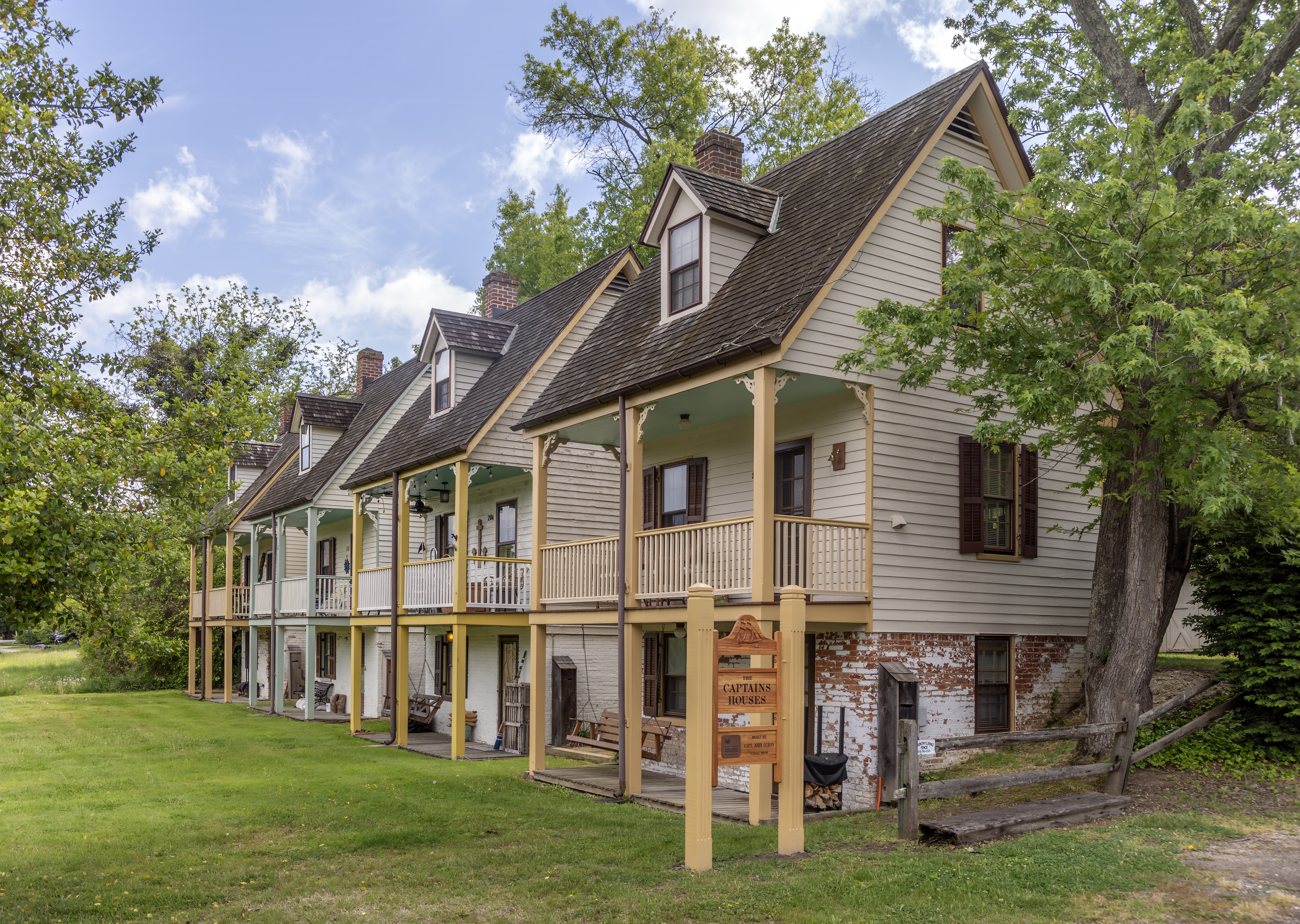
- Captain's Houses, April 2026

- Location within Maryland Location within the United States
- Location: Centreville, Maryland
- Coordinates: 39°3′7″N 76°4′32″W
- Area: 1.5 acres (0.61 ha)
- Built: 1878
- Built by: Ozmon, John, H.
- NRHP reference No.: 80001830
- Added to NRHP: November 17, 1980

The Captain's Houses are a row of four nearly identical houses built along the Corsica River in Centreville, Maryland after the Civil War. The houses are built on raised brick foundations into a small bluff along the creek, allowing access to the main level from the top of the bluff. The upper levels of the houses are framed construction.

The houses were listed on the National Register of Historic Places in 1988.
