= Centreville Armory =

Historic building in Maryland, US

- U.S. National Register of Historic Places
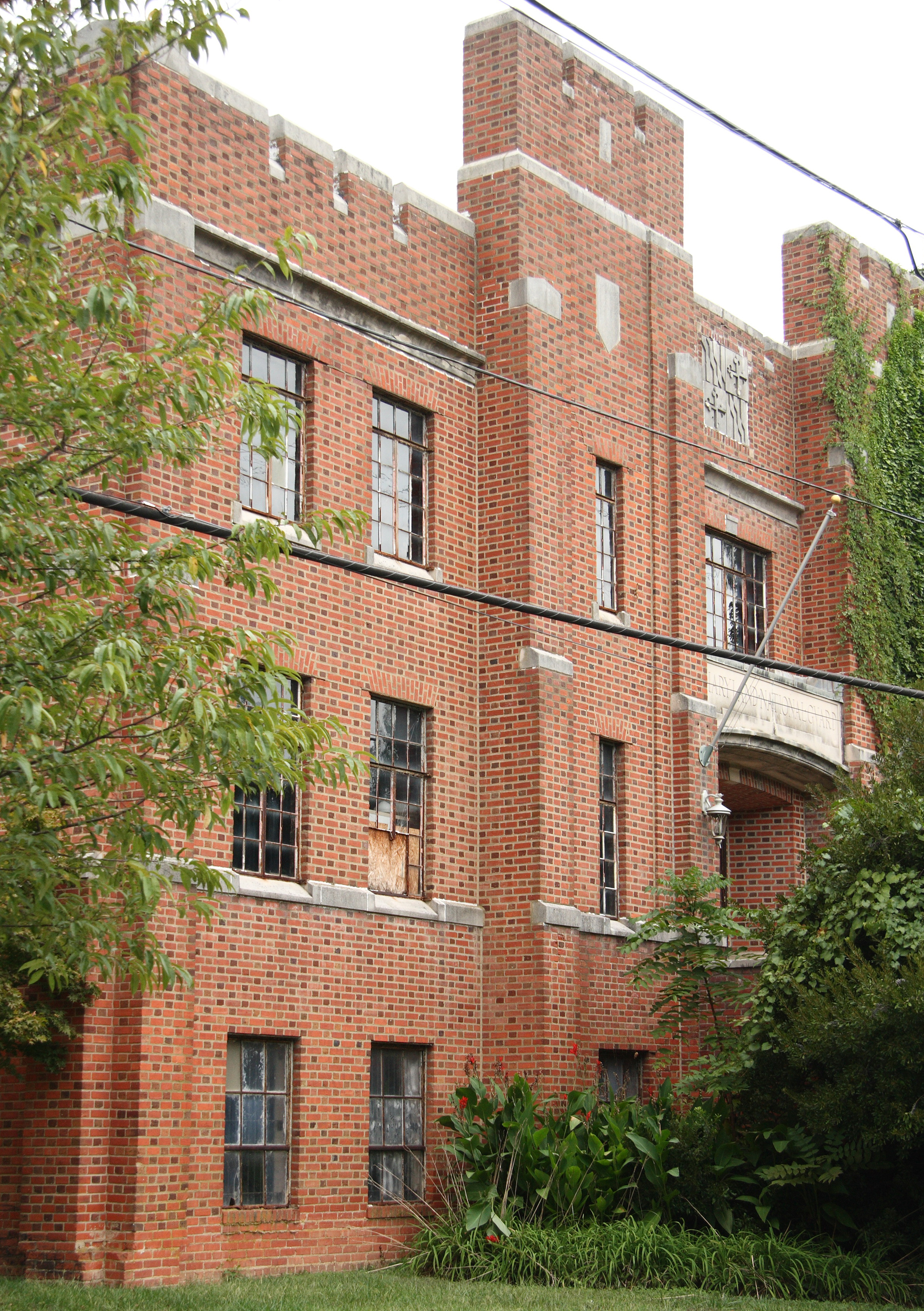

- Location within Maryland Location within the United States
- Location: S. Commerce St., Centreville, Maryland
- Coordinates: 39°2′30″N 76°4′5″W
- Area: 0.4 acres (0.16 ha)
- Built: 1926
- Architectural style: T shape
- MPS: Maryland National Guard Armories TR
- NRHP reference No.: 85002666
- Added to NRHP: September 25, 1985

The Centreville Armory in Centreville, Maryland, is part of a series of Maryland National Guard armories built in the 1920s in principal towns in Maryland. The armories followed a standard design with a castle-like front housing offices and meeting spaces, backed by a large drill hall.

The armory was listed on the National Register of Historic Places in 1985.

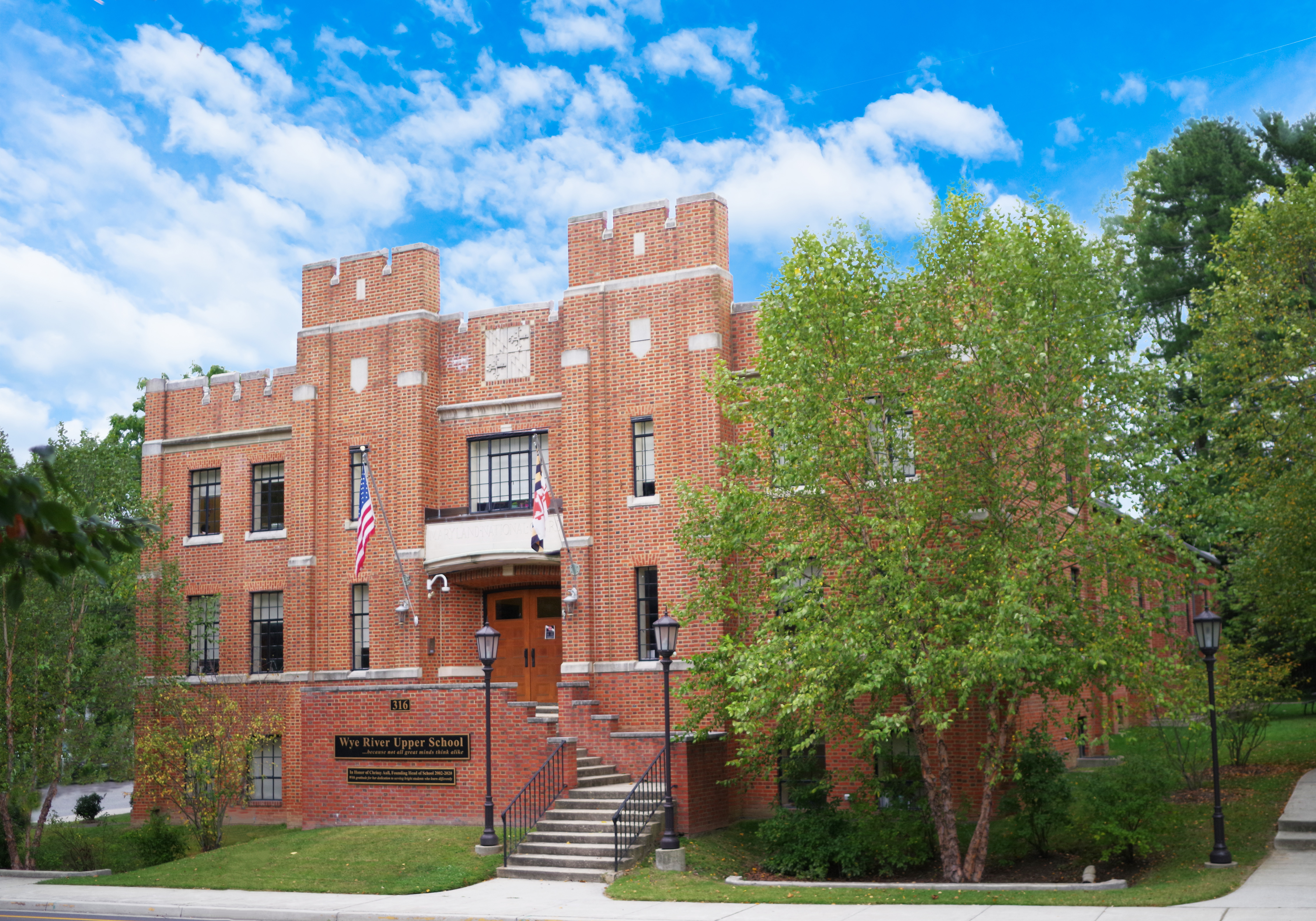
Wye River Upper School purchased the Centreville Armory building in 2010 and converted it into a school.

The Centreville Armory was purchased by Wye River Upper School in 2010 and became the main campus of the independent co-educational day school for students with learning differences in 2014.
