= John Embert Farm =

Historic house in Maryland, United States

- U.S. National Register of Historic Places
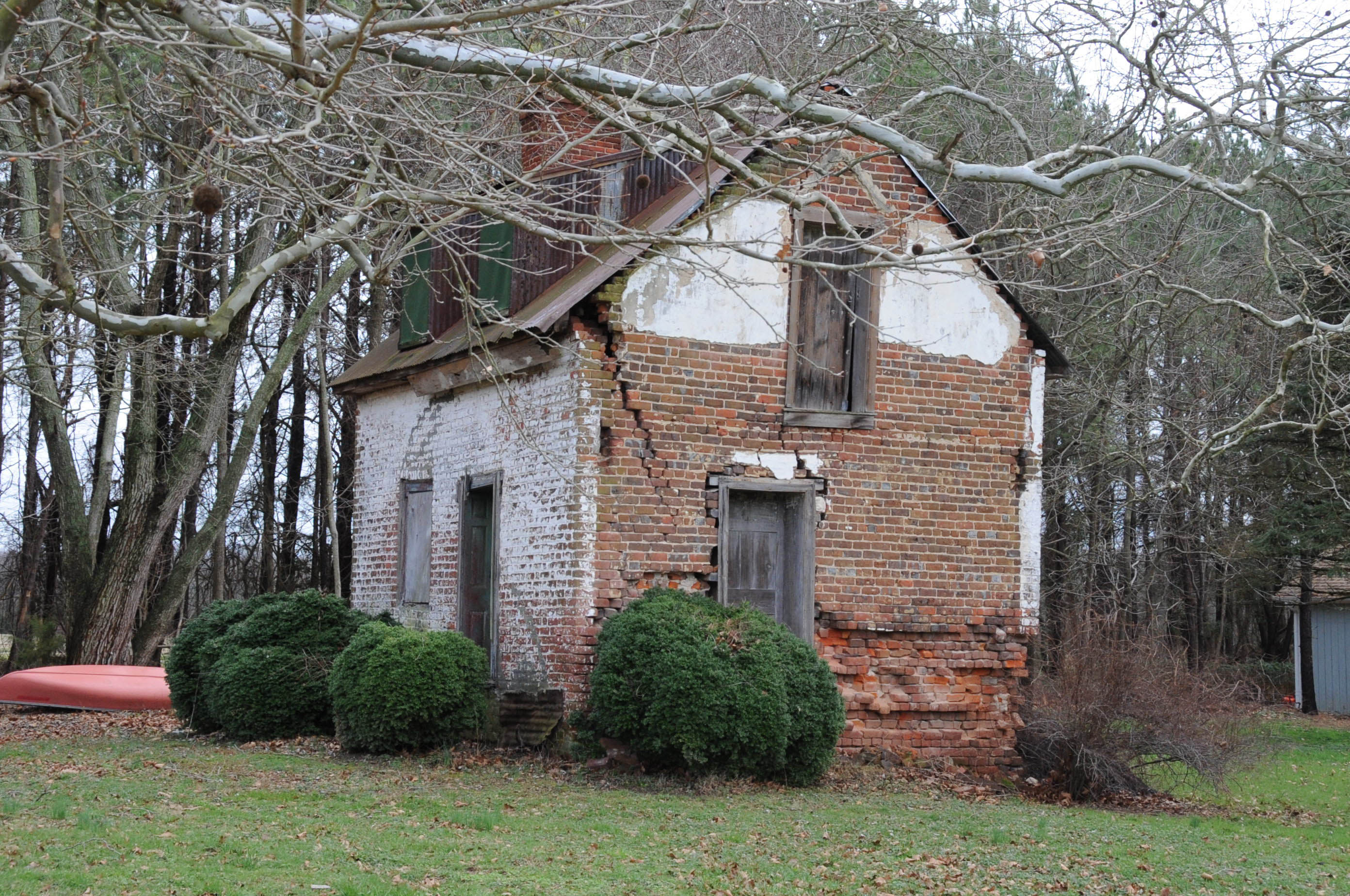

- Location within Maryland Location within the United States
- Nearest city: Millington, Maryland
- Coordinates: 39°13′30″N 75°48′40″W
- Area: 1 acre (0.40 ha)
- Built: 1800
- Built by: Vandyke, William
- NRHP reference No.: 80001832
- Added to NRHP: June 22, 1980

The John Embert Farm is a historic home located at Millington, Queen Anne's County, Maryland, United States. It is a 1 1/2-story Flemish bond brick house with a two-bay facade. The building is an exceedingly rare and almost pristine example of a small-scale Tidewater house.

The John Embert Farm was listed on the National Register of Historic Places in 1980.
