= Keating House (Centreville, Maryland) =

Historic house in Maryland, United States

- U.S. National Register of Historic Places
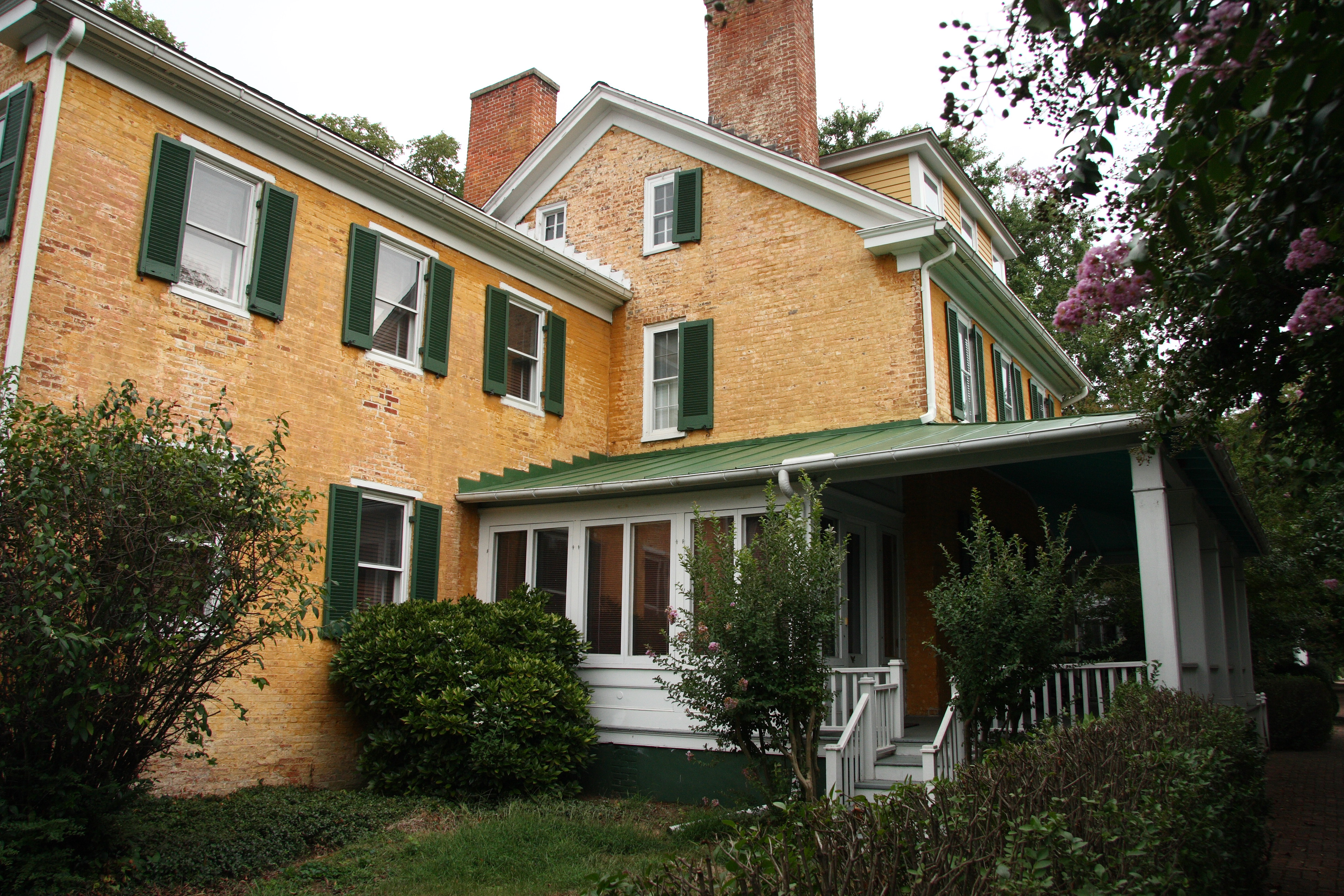

- Location within Maryland Location within the United States
- Location: 208 S. Liberty St., Centreville, Maryland
- Coordinates: 39°2′34.74″N 76°4′04.67″W
- Area: less than one acre
- Built: 1806
- Architectural style: Federal, Greek Revival, 51
- NRHP reference No.: 99001281
- Added to NRHP: October 28, 1999

The Keating House at 208 South Liberty Street in Centreville, Maryland is a Federal style house built c. 1806-1809 by Ebenezer Covington. The interior is particularly well-preserved.

The house was listed on the National Register of Historic Places in 1999.
