= Reed's Creek Farm =

Historic house in Maryland, United States

- U.S. National Register of Historic Places
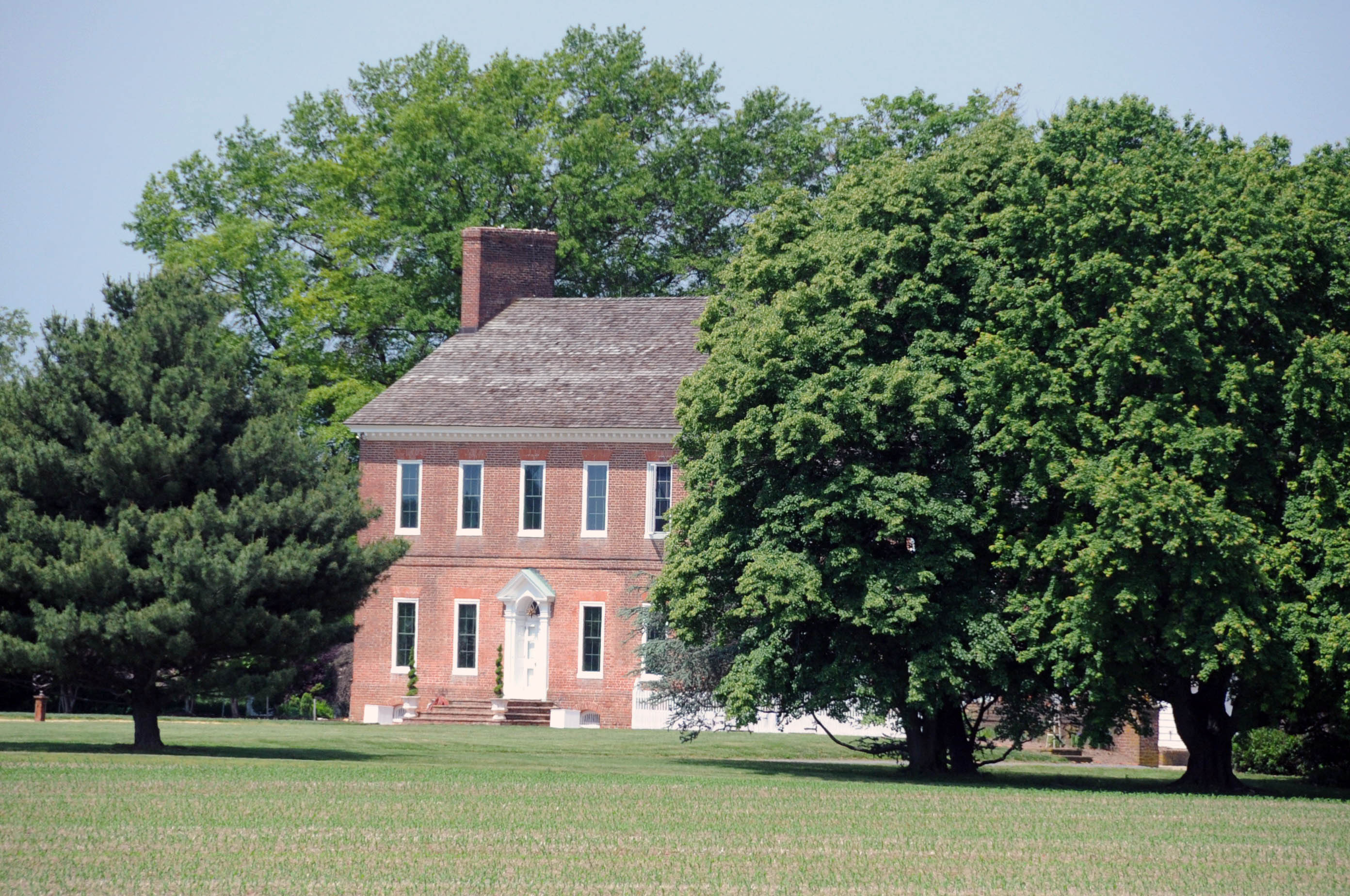

- Location within Maryland Location within the United States
- Location: West of Centreville on Wright's Neck Rd. off Maryland Route 18, Centreville, Maryland
- Coordinates: 39°3′5″N 76°9′12″W
- Area: 158.3 acres (64.1 ha)
- Built: 1775
- Built by: Wright, Col. Thomas
- Architectural style: Georgian
- NRHP reference No.: 75002106
- Added to NRHP: July 7, 1975

Reed's Creek Farm is a historic home located at Centreville, Queen Anne's County, Maryland, United States. It is a late Georgian style brick house reputedly begun in 1775. It is composed of two portions, the larger of the two being a five bay structure laid in Flemish bond.

Reed's Creek Farm was listed on the National Register of Historic Places in 1975.
