= Female Seminary (Centreville, Maryland) =

Historic house in Maryland, United States

- U.S. National Register of Historic Places
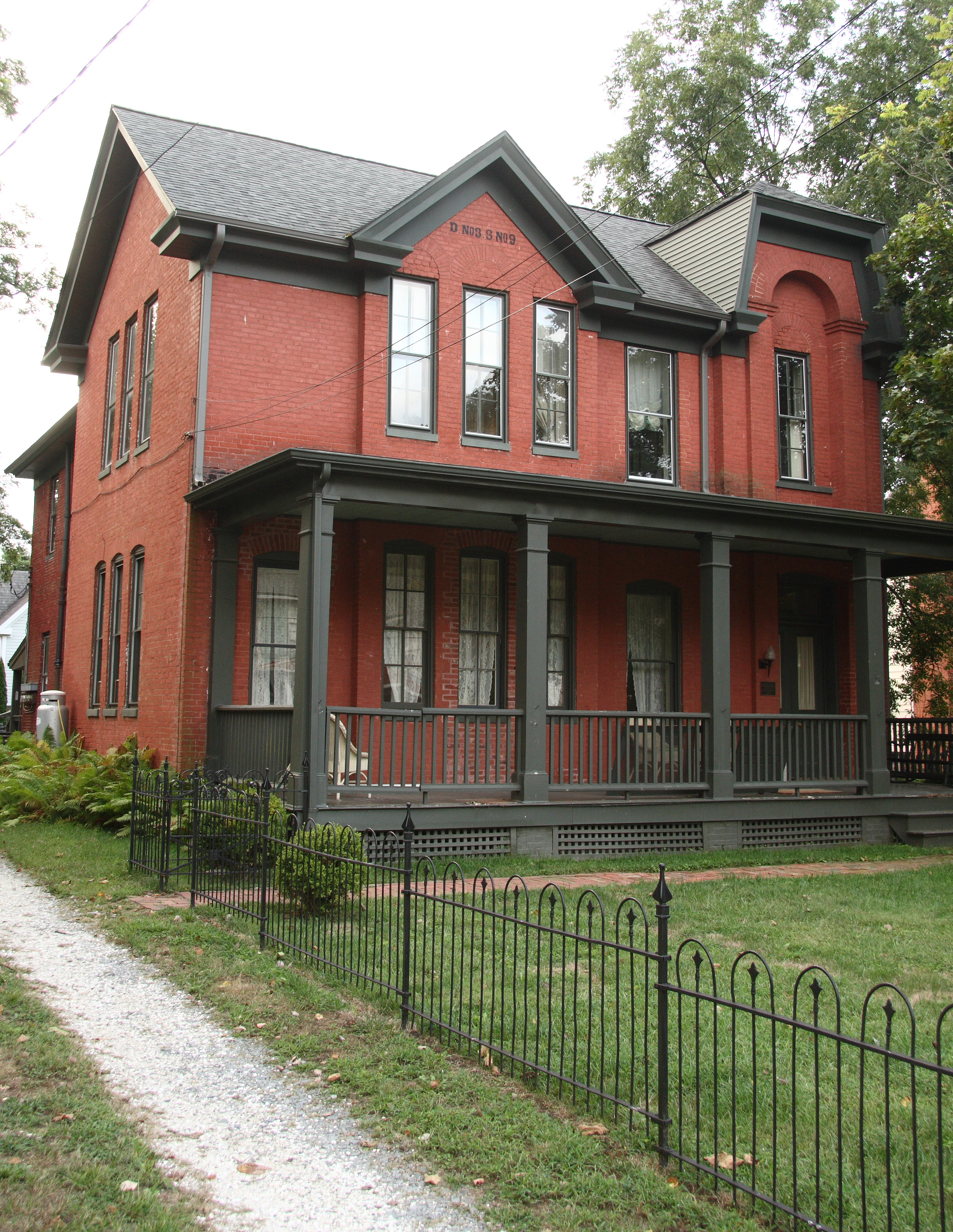
- Female Seminary, September 2008

- Location within Maryland Location within the United States
- Location: 205-207 South Commerce St., Centreville, Maryland
- Coordinates: 39°2′32.42″N 76°3′59.00″W
- Area: less than one acre
- Built by: Smith, Capt. James
- Architectural style: Queen Anne
- NRHP reference No.: 03001266
- Added to NRHP: December 10, 2003

The Female Seminary in Centreville, Maryland was built c. 1876 as a public schoolhouse intended exclusively for women. The pressed-brick building was built in a restrained Victorian style, with two classrooms on each of two floors with a side passage. Separate education lasted for thirty years, and in 1907 the building was sold and converted for residential use.

== See also ==
- Female seminaries
- Women in education in the United States
