= Jackson Collins House =

Historic house in Maryland, United States

- U.S. National Register of Historic Places
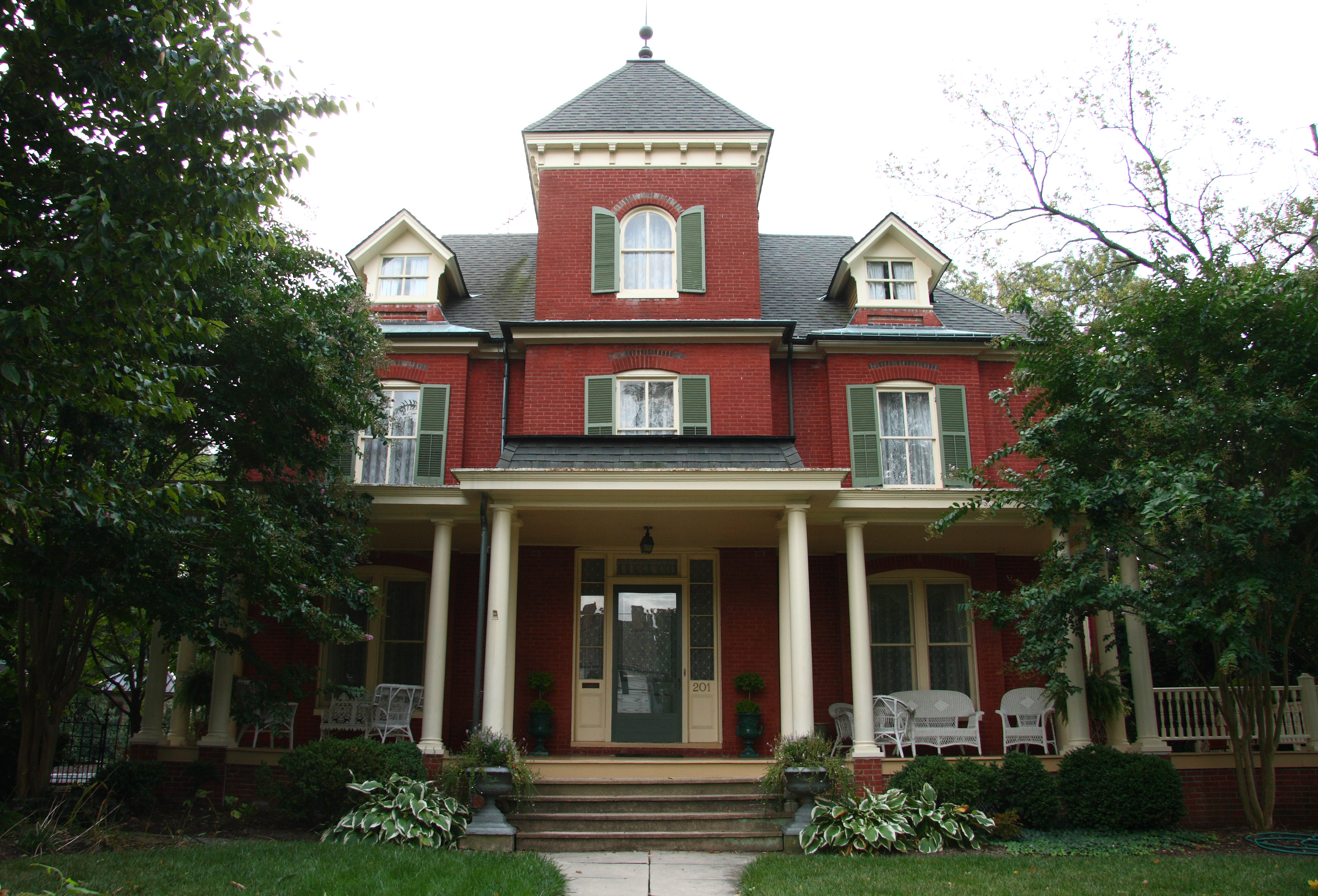

- Location within Maryland Location within the United States
- Location: 201 S. Commerce St., Centreville, Maryland
- Coordinates: 39°2′34.25″N 76°3′57.94″W
- Area: less than one acre
- Built: 1886
- Architectural style: Queen Anne, Italianate
- NRHP reference No.: 00001503
- Added to NRHP: December 13, 2000

The Jackson Collins House (aka "The Red Brick House" to those who have lived there) in Centreville, Maryland was built in 1887 of pressed brick. The plan and roof forms are unusually complex. The house's style is a mixture of Queen Anne and Italianate style, unusually expressed in brick.
