= Content (Centreville, Maryland) =

Historic house in Maryland, United States

- U.S. National Register of Historic Places
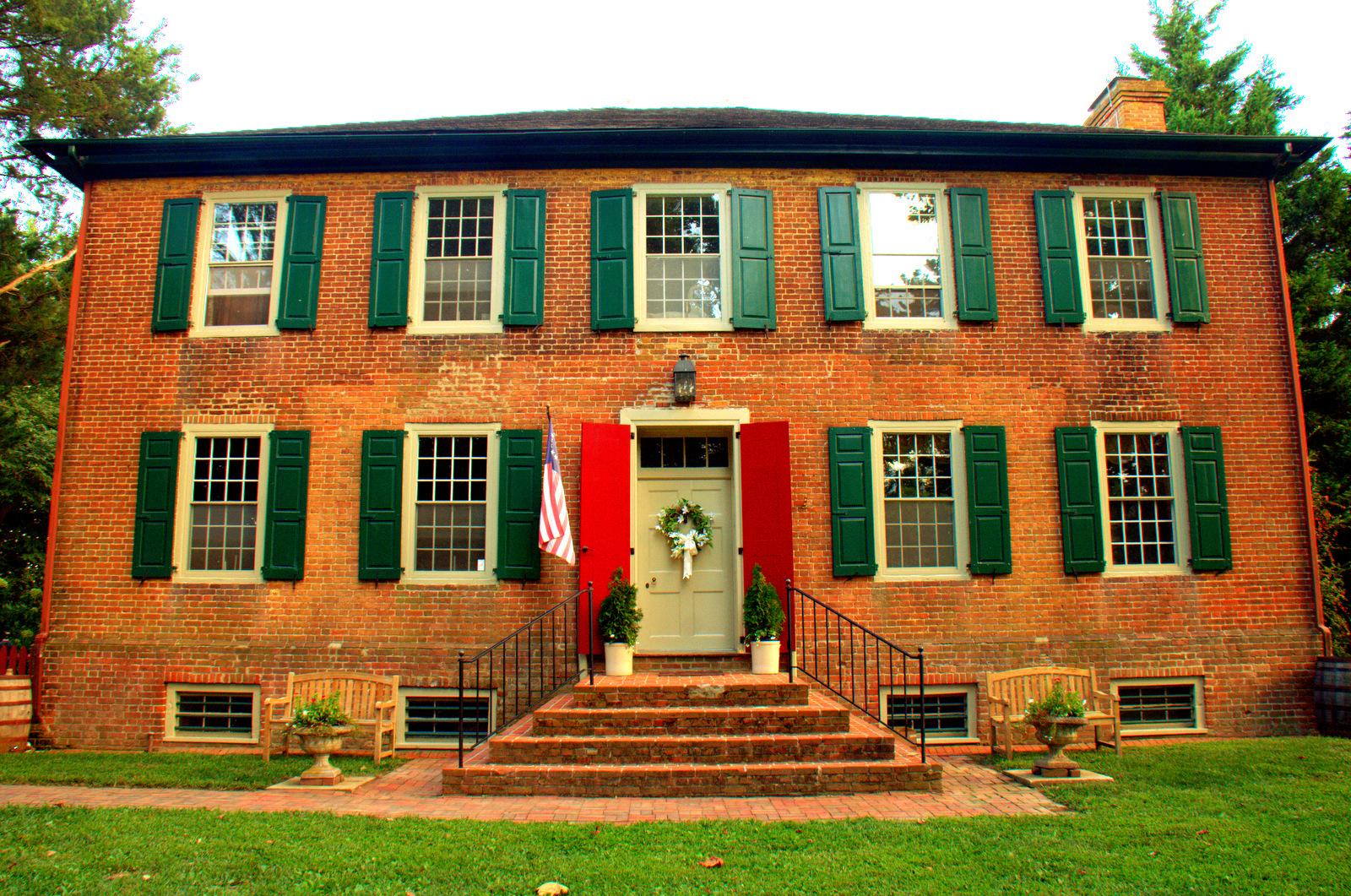

- Location within Maryland Location within the United States
- Location: 842 Hope Road (MD 305), Centreville, Maryland
- Coordinates: 39°2′30″N 76°1′17″W
- Area: 185 acres (75 ha)
- Built: 1775
- NRHP reference No.: 86000256
- Added to NRHP: February 13, 1986

Content, also known as C.C. Harper Farm, is a historic home located near Centreville, Queen Anne's County, Maryland, United States. It is of brick construction, two stories high, five bays wide and one room deep, with a single flush brick chimney. The house was constructed about 1775. Also on the property are a small Flemish bond brick dairy and a meathouse.

Content was listed on the National Register of Historic Places in 1986.
