= Hawkins Pharsalia =

Historic house in Maryland, United States

- U.S. National Register of Historic Places
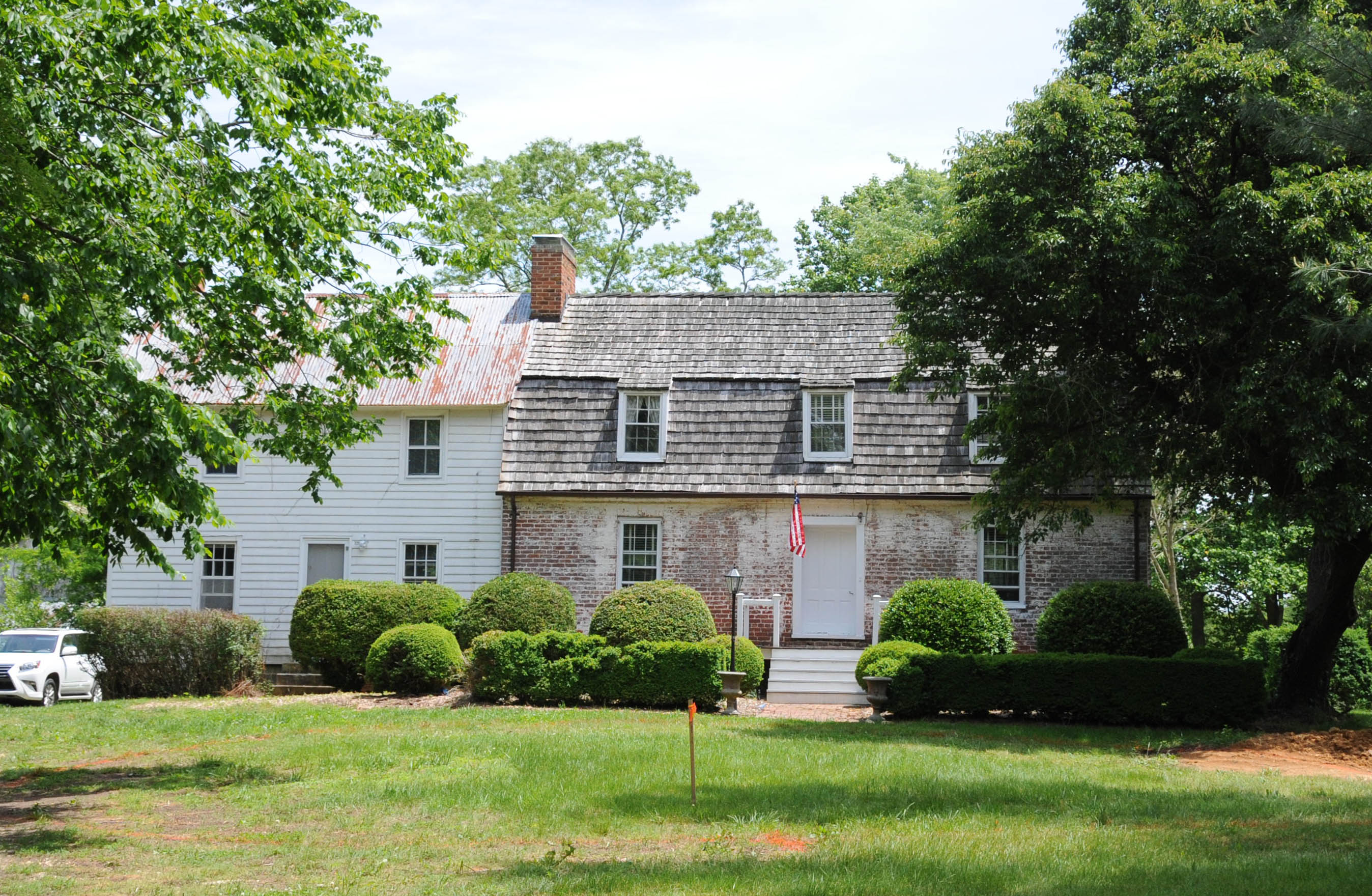

- Location within Maryland Location within the United States
- Location: Ruthsburg Road (MD 304), Ruthsburg, Maryland
- Coordinates: 39°1′2″N 75°55′6″W
- Area: 15 acres (6.1 ha)
- Built: 1829
- NRHP reference No.: 84000458
- Added to NRHP: December 20, 1984

Hawkins Pharsalia is a historic home located at Ruthsburg, Queen Anne's County, Maryland, United States. It is a 1 1/2-story, three-bay, single-pile gambrel-roofed brick dwelling constructed c. 1829, according to a 2015 dendrochronological study by the Oxford Tree-Ring Laboratory. It is one of the best preserved small early-19th century houses in Queen Anne's County, according to the Maryland Historical Trust. Additionally on the property is a brick smokehouse.

Hawkins Pharsalia was listed on the National Register of Historic Places in 1984.
