= Capt. John H. Ozmon Store =

- U.S. National Register of Historic Places
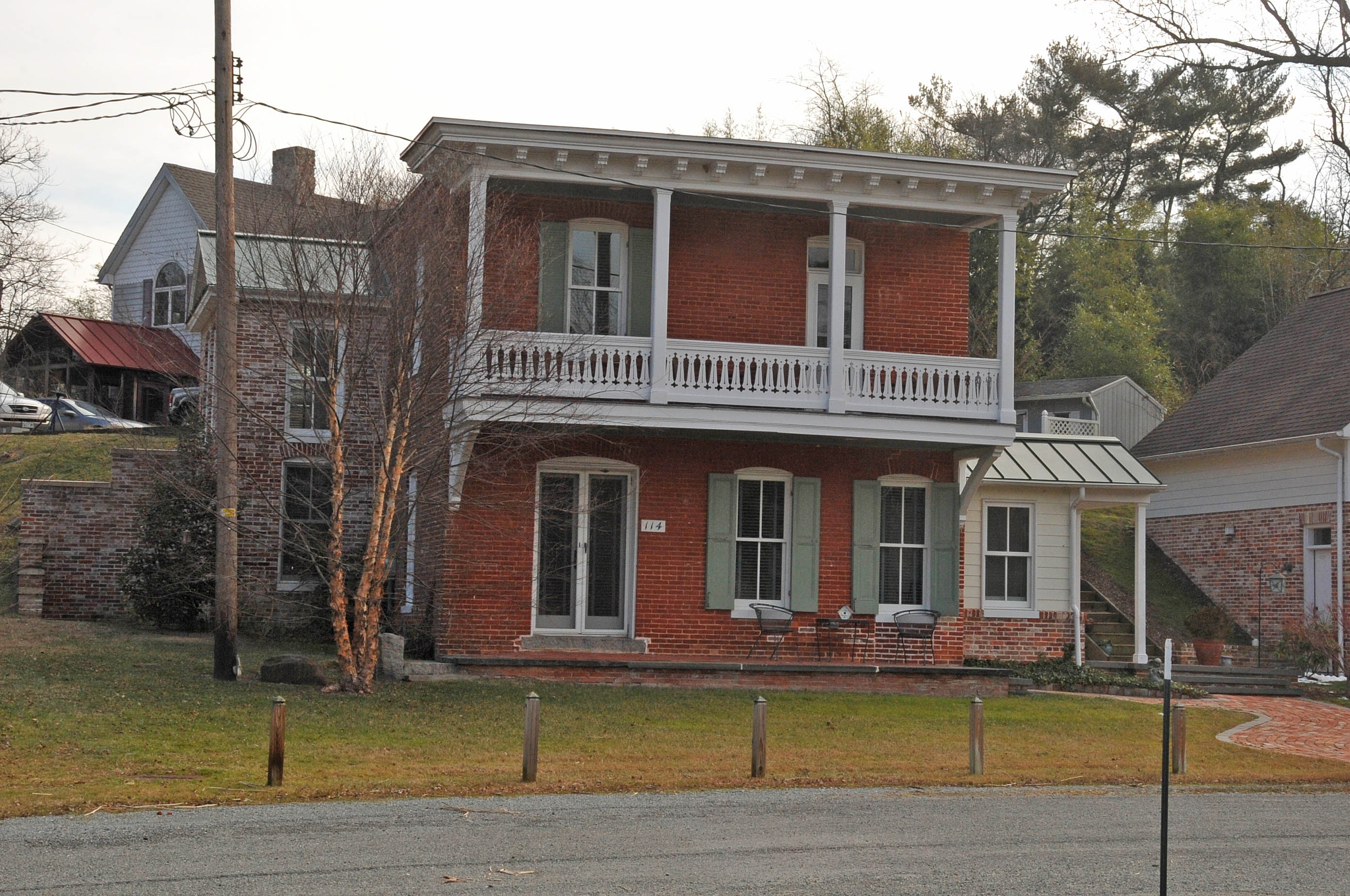

- Location within Maryland Location within the United States
- Location: Centreville Wharf, Centreville, Maryland
- Coordinates: 39°3′12″N 76°4′28″W
- Area: 0.2 acres (0.081 ha)
- Built: 1880
- NRHP reference No.: 85000277
- Added to NRHP: February 14, 1985

The Capt. John H. Ozmon Store is a historic general store located at Centreville, Queen Anne's County, Maryland. It is a two-story brick building constructed about 1880 into the side of a steep bank, with the store occupying the lower story and a dwelling on the second floor. Captain Ozmon was a prominent local merchant who built a considerable business transporting grain, lumber, and other merchandise by sailing schooner between Baltimore, Norfolk, and points on the Eastern Shore of the Chesapeake Bay.

It was listed on the National Register of Historic Places in 1985.
