= Bachelor's Hope (Centreville, Maryland) =

Historic house in Maryland

- U.S. National Register of Historic Places
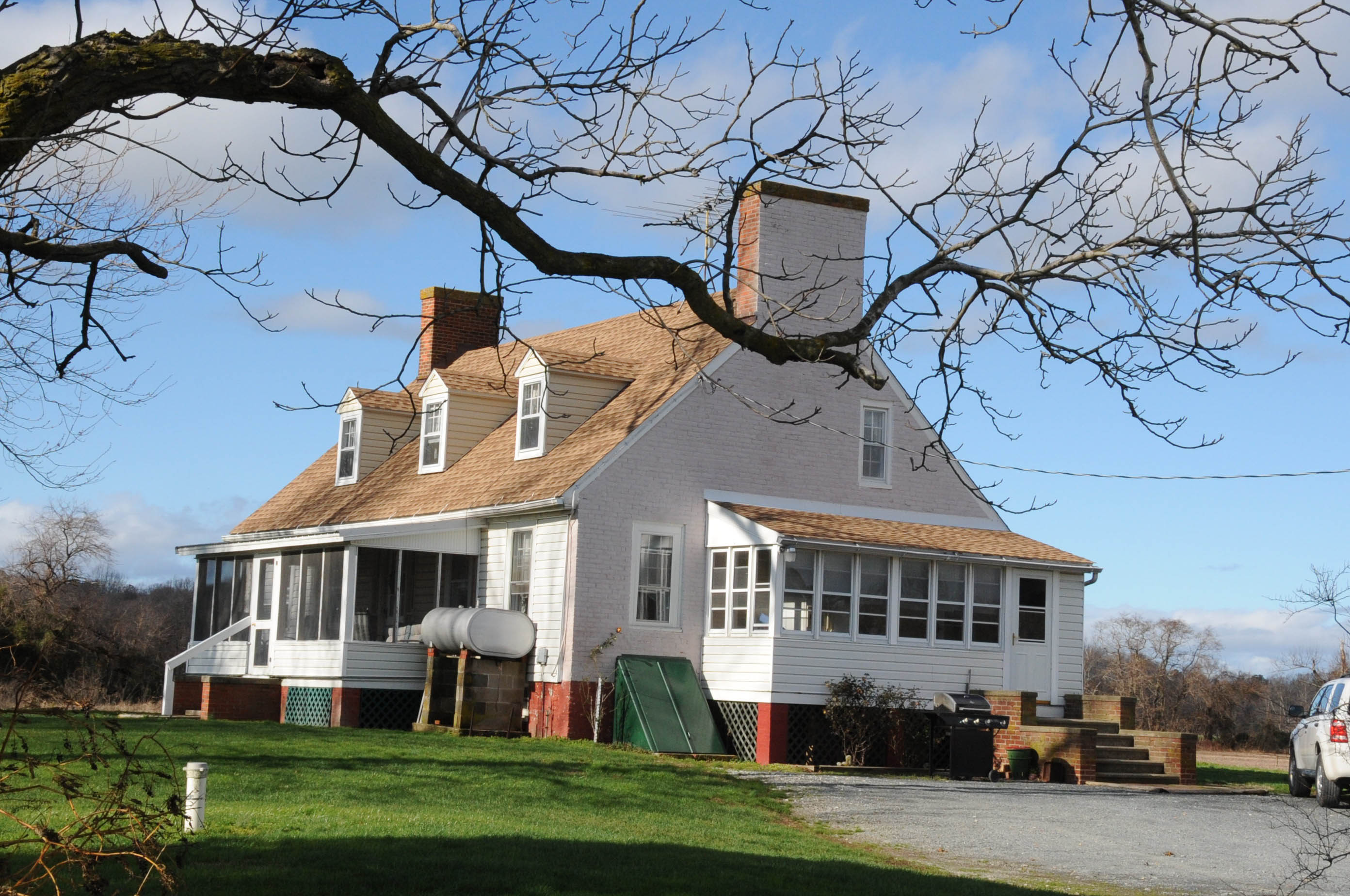

- Location within Maryland Location within the United States
- Location: 201 Bachelors Hope Farm Lane, Centreville, Maryland
- Coordinates: 39°2′1″N 76°6′18″W
- Area: 1.3 acres (0.53 ha)
- Built: 1798
- NRHP reference No.: 84001855
- Added to NRHP: May 3, 1984

Bachelor's Hope is a historic house in Centreville, Maryland. Built between 1798 and 1815, it was added to the National Register of Historic Places in 1984.

== Architecture ==
The house was built of a combination of brick and frame; the gable ends are of brick, while the sides are frame. The five-bay structure is one-and-one-half stories tall, and two rooms deep. The house has a single chimney, centered on the gable, at each end; each chimney is fed by double fireplaces in each gable wall. All of the brick construction, including the foundation, was laid in five-course common bond.

The house has its entrance in the central bay; unusually, the door is flanked by 2/2 sidelights on each side. The rest of the main facade, which faces south towards the old road to Queenstown, is arranged symmetrically; on the first floor, two 9/6 sash windows may be found on either side of the door. Above these are three gable-roofed dormers with 6/6 sash. The facade also has a modern, three-bay porch. The back facade of the house is similar to the front; the paneled door in the center bay has no sidelights, but is flanked on each side by 6/6 windows. Three gable-roofed 6/6/ sash dormers sit above the central door.

The house's interior is an unusual variation on the central hall Georgian plan in which each of the rooms differs in size from the others. Both front rooms contain fireplaces, each centered on the gable wall. The one in the southeast room retains a mantel from the early nineteenth century and fine examples of an interior cornice and raised paneling below the south windows; the baseboard and chair rail are all original. Similar trappings - baseboard, chair rail, and paneling - remain in the southwest room as well. The room to the northwest, by comparison, seems plain; its mantel dates to the late nineteenth century, as does its window trim. The northeast room has been modernized, and now serves as a kitchen. To the rear of the first story is a hall, adjoining which is an enclosed winder stair; this gives access to the second floor. Nearly all of the trim on the second story is original, including window and door architraves, fireplace surrounds, and raised panel doors.

== Significance ==
Bachelor's Hope is considered important because of the unusual features combined in its design; it is believed to be a unique house on the central Eastern Shore of Maryland. The technology used to build it, combining brick gable ends and frame sides, is rarely seen today in surviving buildings. The double pile floor plan is unusual for a house of this size, as is the rarely seen variation on the Georgian central-hall plan. Adding to its historic value, the structure is fairly close to its original condition, some alterations to the first floor notwithstanding. Much of the early fabric remains intact; in addition to the above-noted items may be seen original horizontal beaded wainscoting in the northwest room and the first floor's rear hall, and all of the original woodwork on the second story.
