= Centreville, Maryland =

Incorporated town in Queen Anne's County, Maryland, United States

- Town
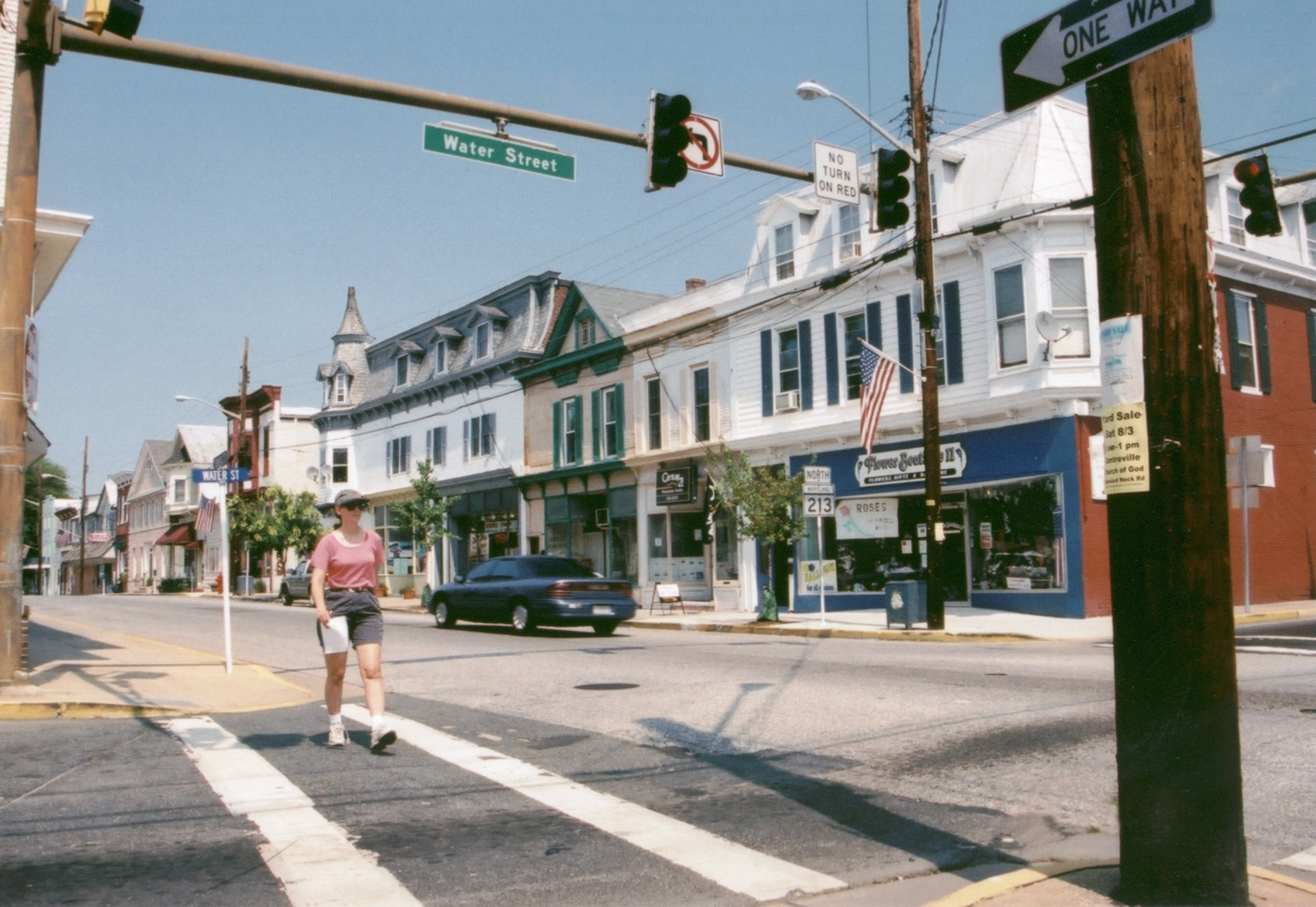
- Intersection of Commerce and Water Street

- Flag Seal

- Location in Queen Anne's County and the state of Maryland

- Location within the state of Maryland Centreville (the United States)
- Coordinates: 39°2′46″N 76°3′52″W
- Country: United States
- State: Maryland
- County: Queen Anne's
- Incorporated: 1794

Area
  - Total: 2.74 sq mi (7.09 km^{2})
  - Land: 2.74 sq mi (7.09 km^{2})
  - Water: 0 sq mi (0.00 km^{2})
- Elevation: 49 ft (15 m)

Population (2020)
  - Total: 4,727
  - Density: 1,726.8/sq mi (666.74/km^{2})
- Time zone: UTC−5 (Eastern (EST))
  - Summer (DST): UTC−4 (EDT)
- ZIP code: 21617
- Area code: 410
- FIPS code: 24-14950
- GNIS feature ID: 0597212
- Website: www.townofcentreville.org

Centreville is an incorporated town in Queen Anne's County, Maryland, United States on the Delmarva Peninsula. Incorporated in 1794, it is the county seat of Queen Anne's County. As of the 2020 census, Centreville had a population of 4,727. The ZIP code is 21617 and the area codes are 410 and 443. The primary local telephone exchange is 758. It hosts the Queen Anne's County Fair each summer and was home to three franchises during the existence of the Eastern Shore Baseball League—the Colts, Red Sox, and Orioles.

== Geography ==
Centreville is located at 39°2′46″N 76°3′52″W (39.046206, −76.064345).

According to the United States Census Bureau, the town has a total area of 2.45 square miles (6.35 km^{2}), all land.

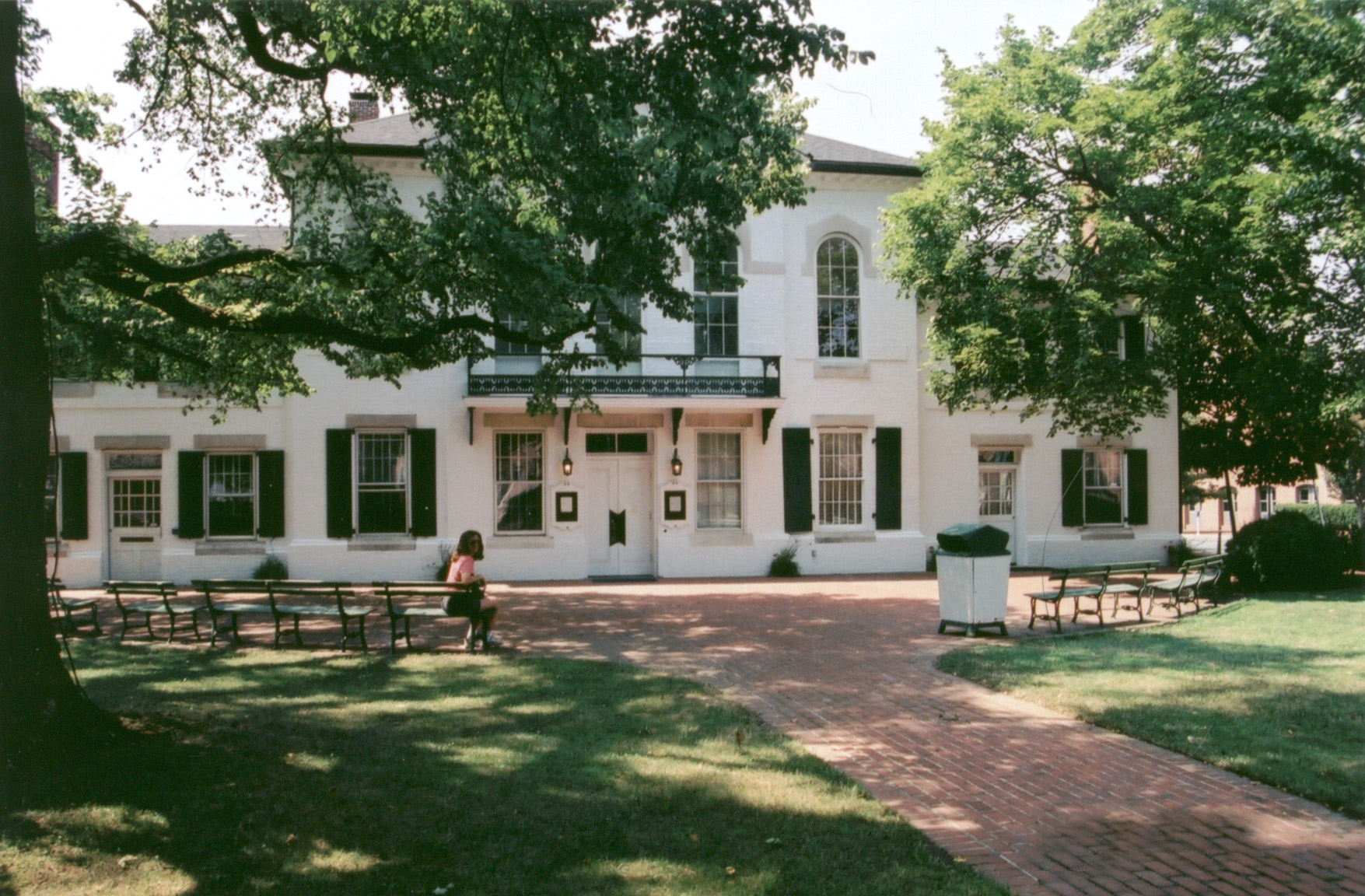
The Queen Anne's County courthouse

== Climate ==
The climate in this area is characterized by hot, humid summers and generally mild to cool winters. According to the Köppen climate classification system, Centreville has a humid subtropical climate, abbreviated "Cfa" on climate maps.

== Demographics ==
Historical population
Census	Pop.	Note	%±
1870	915		—
1880	1,196		30.7%
1890	1,309		9.4%
1900	1,231		−6.0%
1910	1,435		16.6%
1920	1,765		23.0%
1930	1,291		−26.9%
1940	1,141		−11.6%
1950	1,804		58.1%
1960	1,863		3.3%
1970	1,853		−0.5%
1980	2,018		8.9%
1990	2,097		3.9%
2000	1,970		−6.1%
2010	4,285		117.5%
2020	4,727		10.3%
U.S. Decennial Census

=== 2020 census ===
As of the 2020 census, Centreville had a population of 4,727. The median age was 42.1 years. 22.9% of residents were under the age of 18 and 23.1% of residents were 65 years of age or older. For every 100 females there were 92.6 males, and for every 100 females age 18 and over there were 89.2 males age 18 and over.

0.0% of residents lived in urban areas, while 100.0% lived in rural areas.

There were 1,836 households in Centreville, of which 32.7% had children under the age of 18 living in them. Of all households, 52.8% were married-couple households, 13.1% were households with a male householder and no spouse or partner present, and 27.8% were households with a female householder and no spouse or partner present. About 25.2% of all households were made up of individuals and 12.7% had someone living alone who was 65 years of age or older.

There were 1,989 housing units, of which 7.7% were vacant. The homeowner vacancy rate was 3.1% and the rental vacancy rate was 7.8%.

Racial composition as of the 2020 census
Race	Number	Percent
White	3,821	80.8%
Black or African American	523	11.1%
American Indian and Alaska Native	10	0.2%
Asian	59	1.2%
Native Hawaiian and Other Pacific Islander	2	0.0%
Some other race	68	1.4%
Two or more races	244	5.2%
Hispanic or Latino (of any race)	193	4.1%

=== 2010 census ===
As of the census of 2010, there were 4,285 people, 1,568 households, and 1,102 families residing in the town. The population density was 1,749.0 inhabitants per square mile (675.3/km^{2}). There were 1,694 housing units at an average density of 691.4 per square mile (267.0/km^{2}). The racial makeup of the town was 85.0% White, 10.6% African American, 0.3% Native American, 1.4% Asian, 0.5% from other races, and 2.3% from two or more races. Hispanic or Latino of any race were 2.7% of the population.

There were 1,568 households, of which 38.0% had children under the age of 18 living with them, 55.6% were married couples living together, 11.4% had a female householder with no husband present, 3.3% had a male householder with no wife present, and 29.7% were non-families. 25.1% of all households were made up of individuals, and 10.8% had someone living alone who was 65 years of age or older. The average household size was 2.60 and the average family size was 3.12.

The median age in the town was 39.5 years. 27.5% of residents were under the age of 18; 5.2% were between the ages of 18 and 24; 26% were from 25 to 44; 23.4% were from 45 to 64; and 17.9% were 65 years of age or older. The gender makeup of the town was 47.6% male and 52.4% female.

=== 2000 census ===
As of the census of 2000, there were 1,970 people, 807 households, and 497 families residing in the town. The population density was 937.9 inhabitants per square mile (362.1/km^{2}). There were 866 housing units at an average density of 412.3 per square mile (159.2/km^{2}). The racial makeup of the town was 78.68% White, 19.24% African American, 0.10% Native American, 0.56% Asian, 0.15% from other races, and 1.27% from two or more races. Hispanic or Latino of any race were 0.81% of the population.

There were 807 households, out of which 27.5% had children under the age of 18 living with them, 42.4% were married couples living together, 16.1% had a female householder with no husband present, and 38.4% were non-families. 32.8% of all households were made up of individuals, and 15.0% had someone living alone who was 65 years of age or older. The average household size was 2.25 and the average family size was 2.84.

In the town, the age distribution of the population shows 21.7% under the age of 18, 5.9% from 18 to 24, 28.6% from 25 to 44, 21.8% from 45 to 64, and 22.0% who were 65 years of age or older. The median age was 41 years. For every 100 females, there were 88.2 males. For every 100 females age 18 and over, there were 79.7 males.

The median income for a household in the town was $41,100, and the median income for a family was $55,595. Males had a median income of $37,011 versus $25,625 for females. The per capita income for the town was $20,630. About 8.1% of families and 15.4% of the population were below the poverty line, including 17.3% of those under age 18 and 17.4% of those age 65 or over.

== History ==
Centreville's name was derived from the relocation of the county seat in 1782 from Queenstown to a more central part of the county.

Saint Paul's Parish was established on the site that would later become known as Centreville, Maryland. It was almost 100 years later, in 1782, that the Maryland State Assembly passed an Act to relocate both the courthouse and all government functions of the county to Centreville from Queenstown, making Centreville the new county seat.

However, it took a decade for the appropriate land to be acquired and for the change to take place. A plantation called Chesterfield was chosen as the land to use for the new town which would hold the county's courthouse. Once the town and court house were completed, on the first of June 1796, the county court, "ordered [the courthouse] to be ‘taken, held and deemed to be the proper Court House of Queen Anne's County’".

In 1782, the Queen Anne's county courthouse was moved from its original location in Queenstown, Maryland to an area that would, twelve years later, be named Centreville. The building's location, at the head of the Corsica River, encouraged population growth in the area.

Centreville became an incorporated town in 1794, two years after the courthouse was completed. At the same time, the town laid out, including four streets that remain today: MD 213, S. Liberty St., N. Commerce St., Water St. (MD 304).

Once Centreville was officially home to Queen Anne's county government, lawmakers and officials decided it was appropriate to name the new town in accordance with the new location. Centreville (named partly due to the town's central location) was also chosen because of its prime location on the Corsica River. Easy access to shipping, trading, and naval waters allowed the town to flourish and to become an important Maryland location.

On August 1, 1871, Centreville became a railroad town when the Queen Anne's and Kent Railroad reached it making it the end of its line that extended to Townsend, Delaware on the other end. At the time the plan was to extend the railroad to Queenstown, Maryland but for technical and political reasons that never happened. Centreville eventually got a rail connection to Queenstown when the Queen Anne's Railroad built a branch between the two but, despite only being a half mile apart, the two railroad lines never connected. In the 1950s the Baltimore, Chesapeake and Atlantic Railway, which controlled the old Queen Anne Railroad line, abandoned the line and it was subsequently removed. Freight service on the line to Townsend continued until the early 2000s. In 2007 The Maryland Transit Administration determined that it was no longer feasible to maintain a rail connection to the center of town. Centreville purchased the railyard south of Water Street/Railroad Avenue. The town removed the rails in 2009 and the rest of the line in town was abandoned.

Today, Centreville is the largest town in Queen Anne's county, with a population of 4,727 (as of the 2020 census). 2017 has become an all-time high for the small town, with a population of 4,767. The Maryland Municipal League's Website, "The Association of Cities and Towns", notes that Centreville's, "[h]istory is reflected in the diverse architecture seen along the streets of the town—elegant Victorian homes with their wrap-around porches, neo-classical public buildings, late-19th-century commercial rows, late-20th-century institutional and government structures, and all the variations and curiosities in between".

Much of the town was added to the National Register of Historic Places as the Centreville Historic District in 2004.

In addition to the Centreville Historic District, Bachelor's Hope, Captain's Houses, Centreville Armory, Jackson Collins House, Content, Female Seminary, Keating House, Lansdowne, Lexon, Capt. John H. Ozmon Store, Readbourne, Reed's Creek Farm, and Stratton are listed on the National Register of Historic Places.

"Centreville was the home of American Impressionist painters Charles M. West and Anne Warner West. Charles was born in Centreville and educated at the Pennsylvania Academy of the Fine Arts in Philadelphia, where he met fellow student Anne Dickie Warner, a native of Wilmington, Delaware. The West Gallery includes a collection of their paintings, many depicting local subjects such as watermen at work, historic buildings and daily life in Centreville." Charles taught painting and sculpture at Washington College in Chestertown, Maryland and is best known for his painting "The Narrows" which was exhibited alongside Edward Hopper and Georgia O'Keeffe

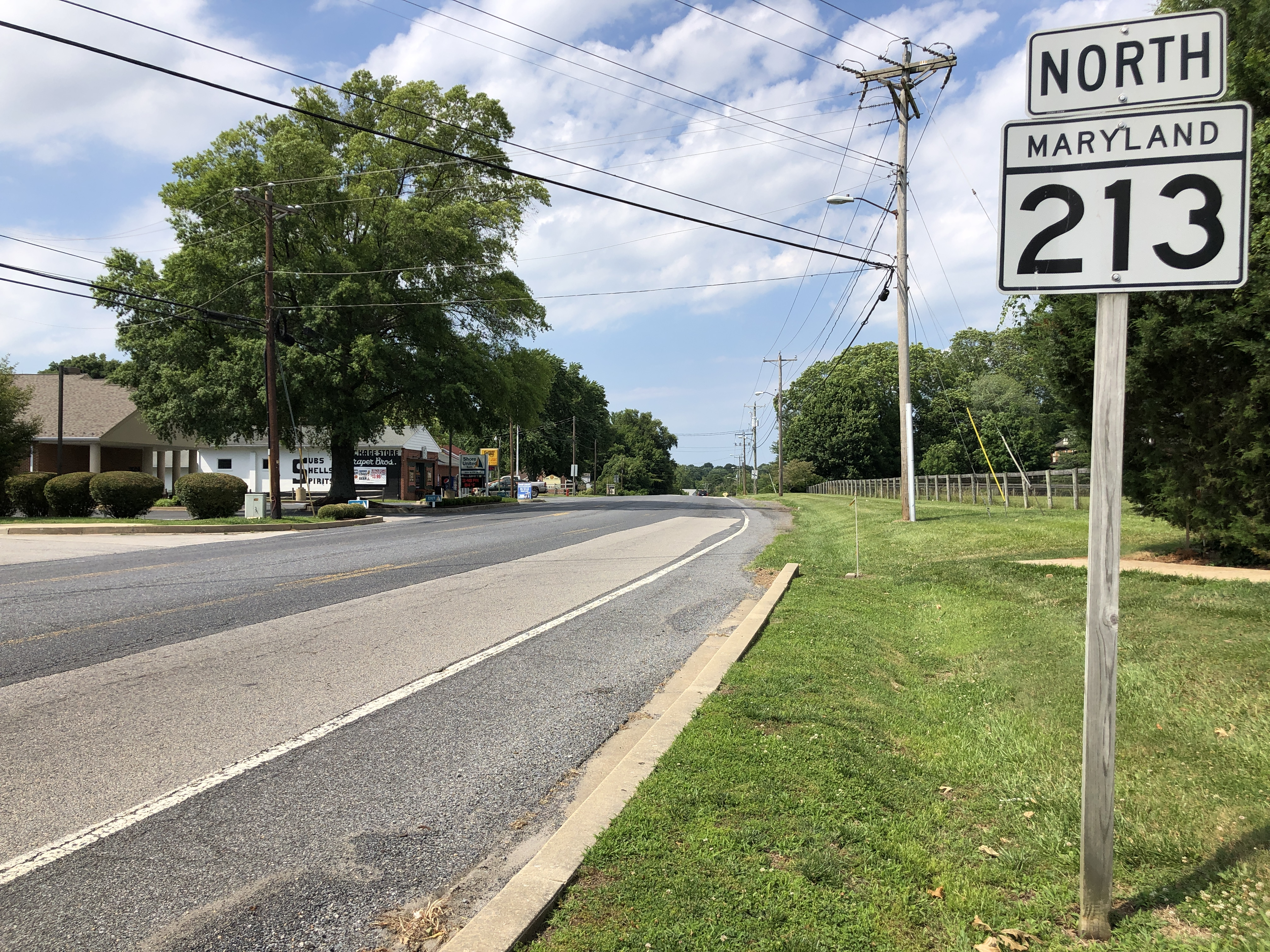
MD 213 northbound entering Centreville

== Transportation ==
The main means of travel to and from Centreville is by road, and four state highways serve the town. The most prominent of these is Maryland Route 213, which serves as the primary road serving local communities along the eastern shore of the Chesapeake Bay. Other state highways serving Centreville include Maryland Route 18, Maryland Route 304 and Maryland Route 305. U.S. Route 301 passes to the southeast, providing a high-speed highway to metropolitan areas such as Philadelphia and Washington D.C.

== Courthouse ==
The oldest courthouse in continuous use, and one of two 18th-century courthouses in Maryland, the Queen Anne's County Courthouse is located at 120 North Commerce Street. The location for the courthouse, and for the town of Centreville, was a piece of land on which Judge Joseph Hopper Nicholson lived on at the time. In 1792 the Flemish-bond brick building was completed. At the time it was composed of four rooms, two in the center and one on each side. The courthouse's use was increasing, so, in 1876 it was renovated and remodeled to add more space. An iron balcony was also added to the second story.

A unique feature of the courthouse is a gold eagle on the main building's rooftop. The eagle is thought to be symbolic of America's freedom from England and relays the idea of independence. In Judge John W. Sause, Jr.'s essay, "Why the Eagle", he connects the idea of freedom and the importance of the United States’ seal to the courthouse's eagle. Here, he writes, "Executed by an unknown hand, undoubtedly that of an artisan rather than an artist...our eagle looked down upon the comings and going of the courtyard, the tears and smiles of its citizens and the successes and failures of the political system which it was designed to represent".

A statue of Queen Anne of England, the county's namesake, sits in front of the courthouse. Princess Anne, daughter of Queen Elizabeth II, attended the dedication (1977).

Today, the courthouse remains an important figure in Centreville, Queen Anne's County, and the state of Maryland. Keeping true to its original form, the building's exterior is true to its original look.

== Education ==
The Queen Anne's County Public Schools includes the Queen Anne's County High School.
