= Lansdowne (Centreville, Maryland) =

Historic house in Maryland, United States

- U.S. National Register of Historic Places
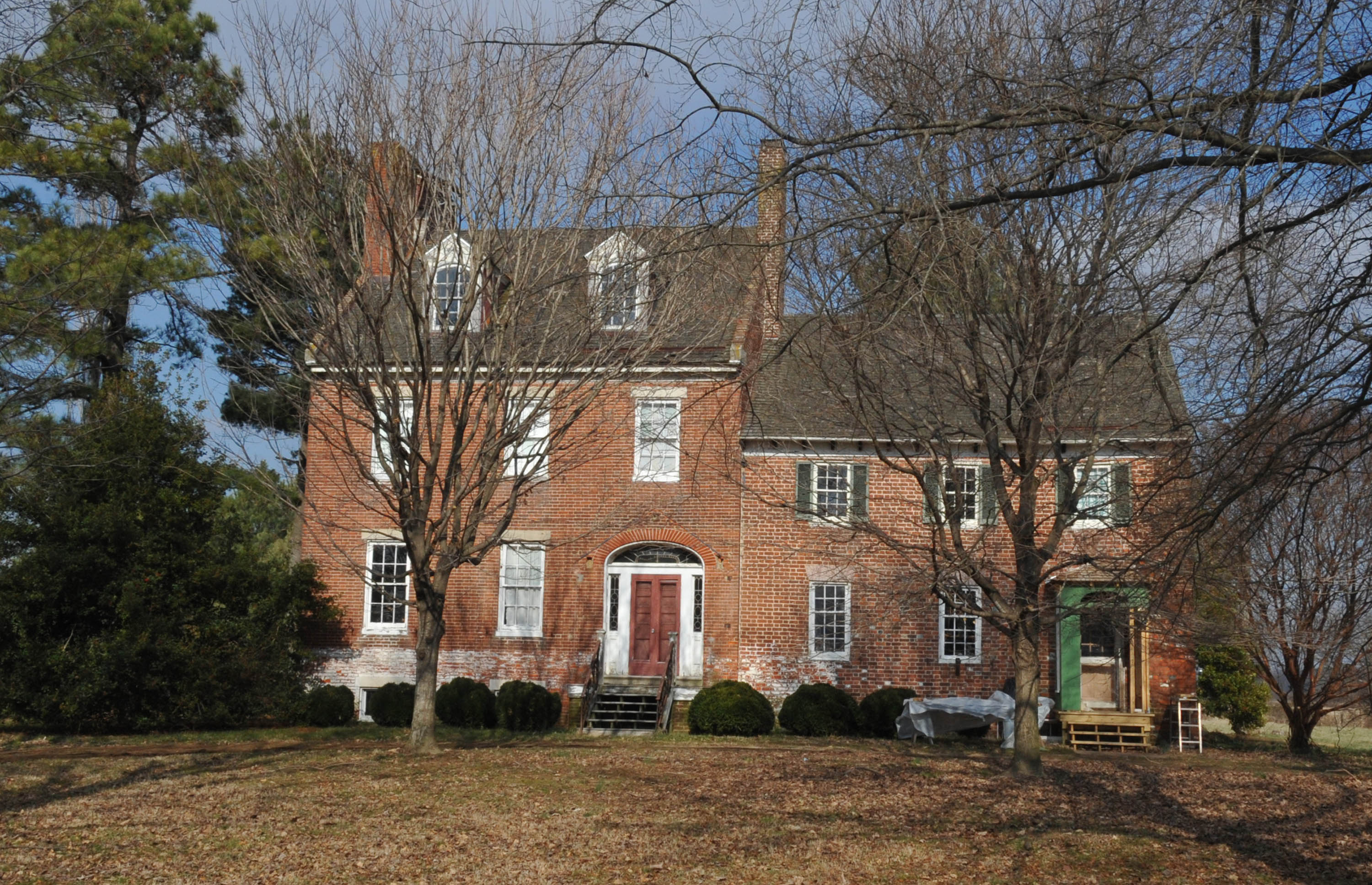

- Location within Maryland Location within the United States
- Location: Hope Road (MD 305), Centreville, Maryland
- Coordinates: 39°2′49″N 75°59′26″W
- Area: 1.6 acres (0.65 ha)
- Built: 1760
- NRHP reference No.: 84001858
- Added to NRHP: June 7, 1984

Lansdowne, also known as Upper Deale or Lansdowne Farm, is a historic home and farm complex located at Centreville, Queen Anne's County, Maryland, United States. It consists of a brick dwelling, and a large barn, granary, and several outbuildings. The house was built in two distinct periods. The earliest house dates to the late colonial period and is a two-story, brick house, three bays wide and two rooms deep, with a single flush chimney on each gable. It is attached to a larger, Federal-period house built in 1823. The later house is brick, two and a half stories high, and was built directly adjoining the west gable of the earlier structure.

Lansdowne was listed on the National Register of Historic Places in 1984.
