= Lexon =

Historic house in Centreville, Queen Anne's County, Maryland, United States

- U.S. National Register of Historic Places
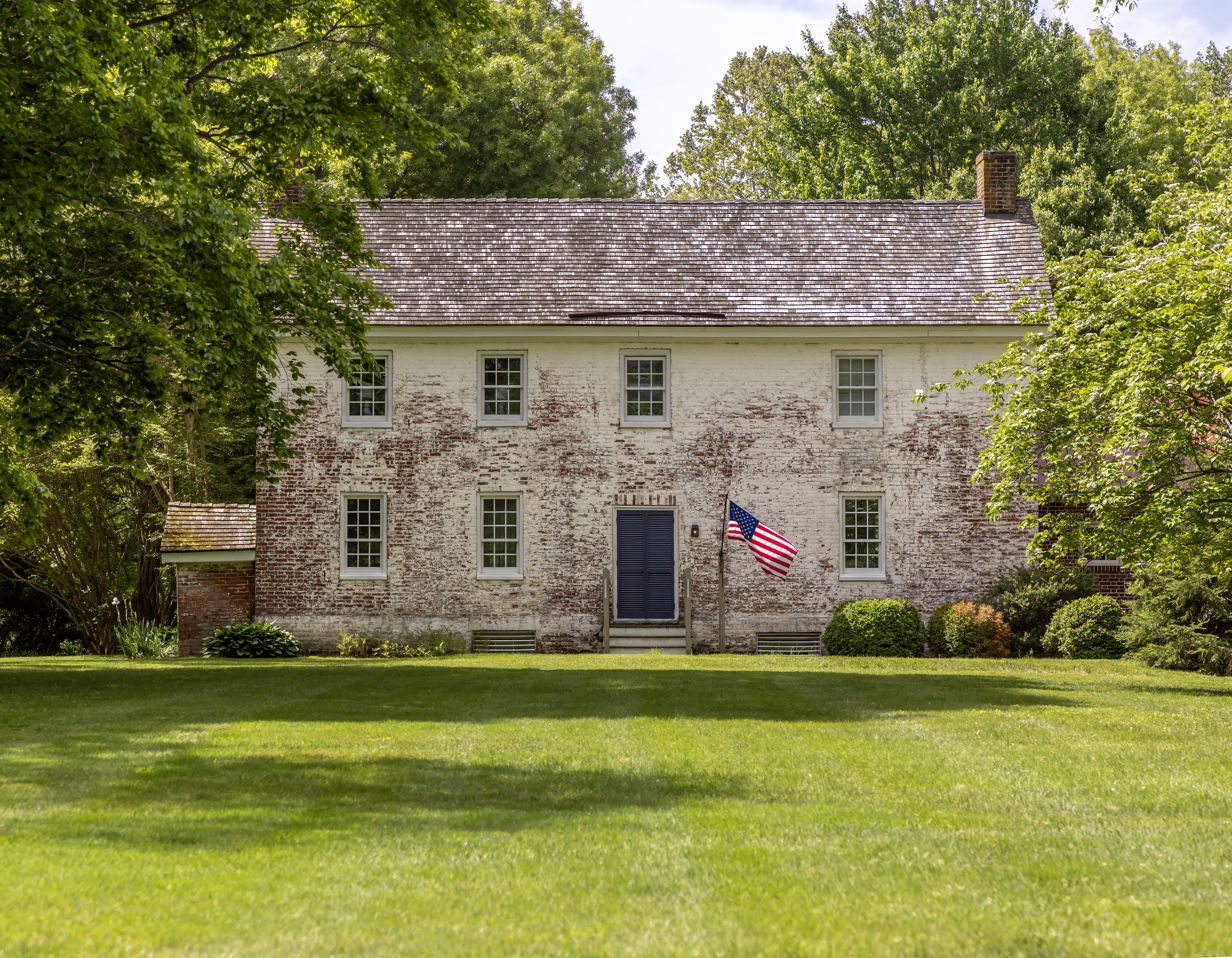
- Lexon in 2026

- Location within Maryland Location within the United States
- Location: Corsica Neck Rd. southwest of Earle Cove, Centreville, Maryland
- Coordinates: 39°3′16″N 76°5′15″W
- Area: 16 acres (6.5 ha)
- Built: 1760
- Architectural style: Colonial
- NRHP reference No.: 90000726
- Added to NRHP: May 4, 1990

Lexon, also known as the Burris-Brockmeyer Farm, is a historic home located at Centreville, Queen Anne's County, Maryland. It was constructed in the third quarter of the 18th century. It is a two-story brick house with a pitched gable roof, center passage single pile plan. Federal and Greek Revival interior decorative detailing result from changes in the first half of the 19th century.

It was listed on the National Register of Historic Places in 1990.
