= Centreville Historic District (Centreville, Maryland) =

Historic district in Maryland, United States

- U.S. National Register of Historic Places
- U.S. Historic district
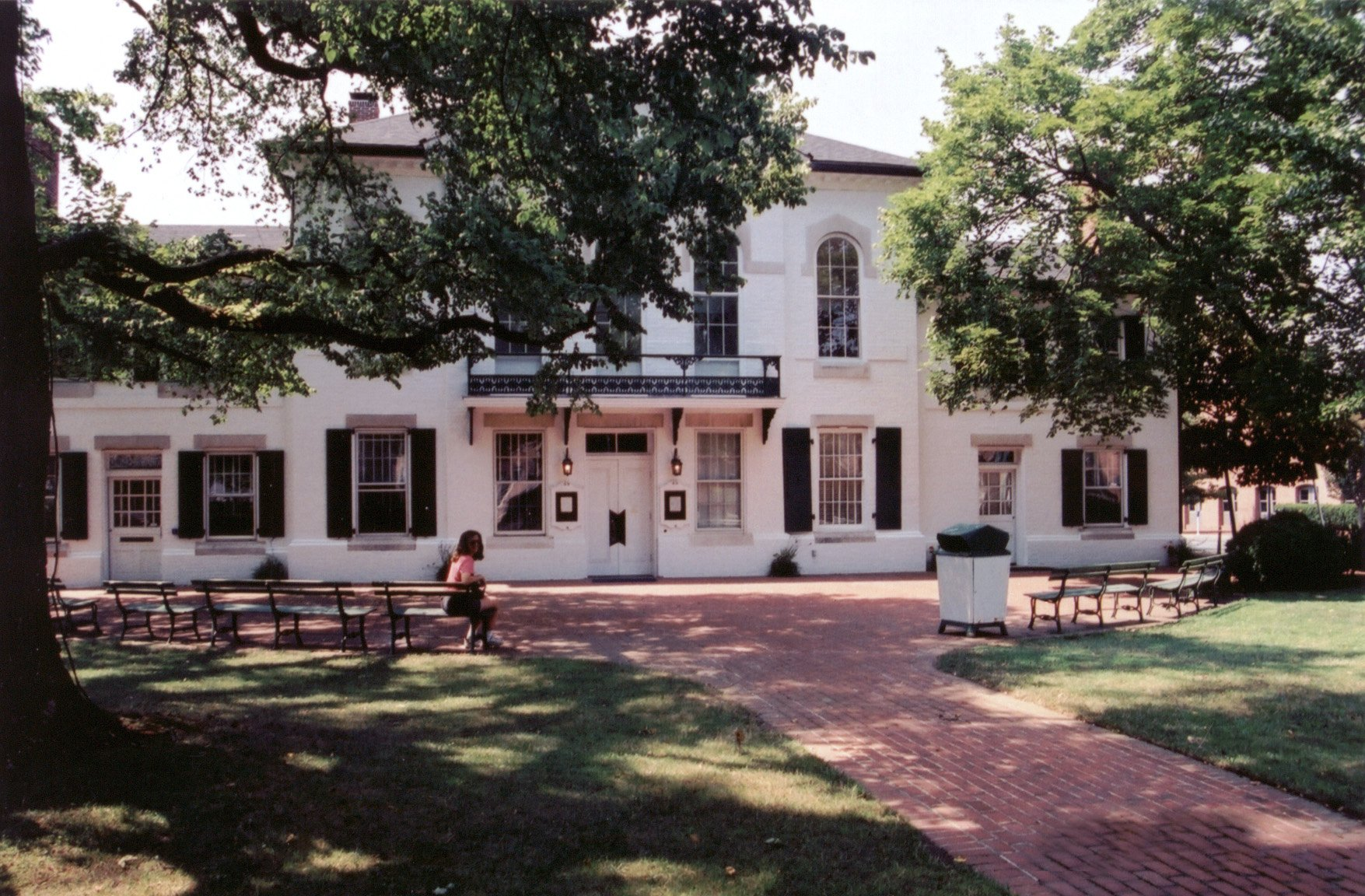
- Queen Anne's County courthouse, October 2007

- Location within Maryland Location within the United States
- Location: Roughly bounded by Corsica R, Chesterfield Ave, Liberty St, Banio Ln, Railroad Ave, town limits and Mill Stream, Centreville, Maryland
- Coordinates: 39°2′45″N 76°4′2″W
- Area: 515 acres (208 ha)
- Built: 1792
- Architectural style: Federal, Greek Revival
- NRHP reference No.: 04001218
- Added to NRHP: November 13, 2004

Centreville Historic District is a national historic district at Centreville, Queen Anne's County, Maryland, United States. It contains an exceptional collection of 18th, 19th, and 20th century buildings chronicling the architectural development of an Eastern Shore of Maryland community. Among Centreville's residential, commercial, and ecclesiastical buildings are representative examples of the various architectural types and styles which characterized towns in the region during the period.

It was added to the National Register of Historic Places in 2004.
