= Thomas House (Ruthsburg, Maryland) =

Historic house in Maryland, United States

- U.S. National Register of Historic Places
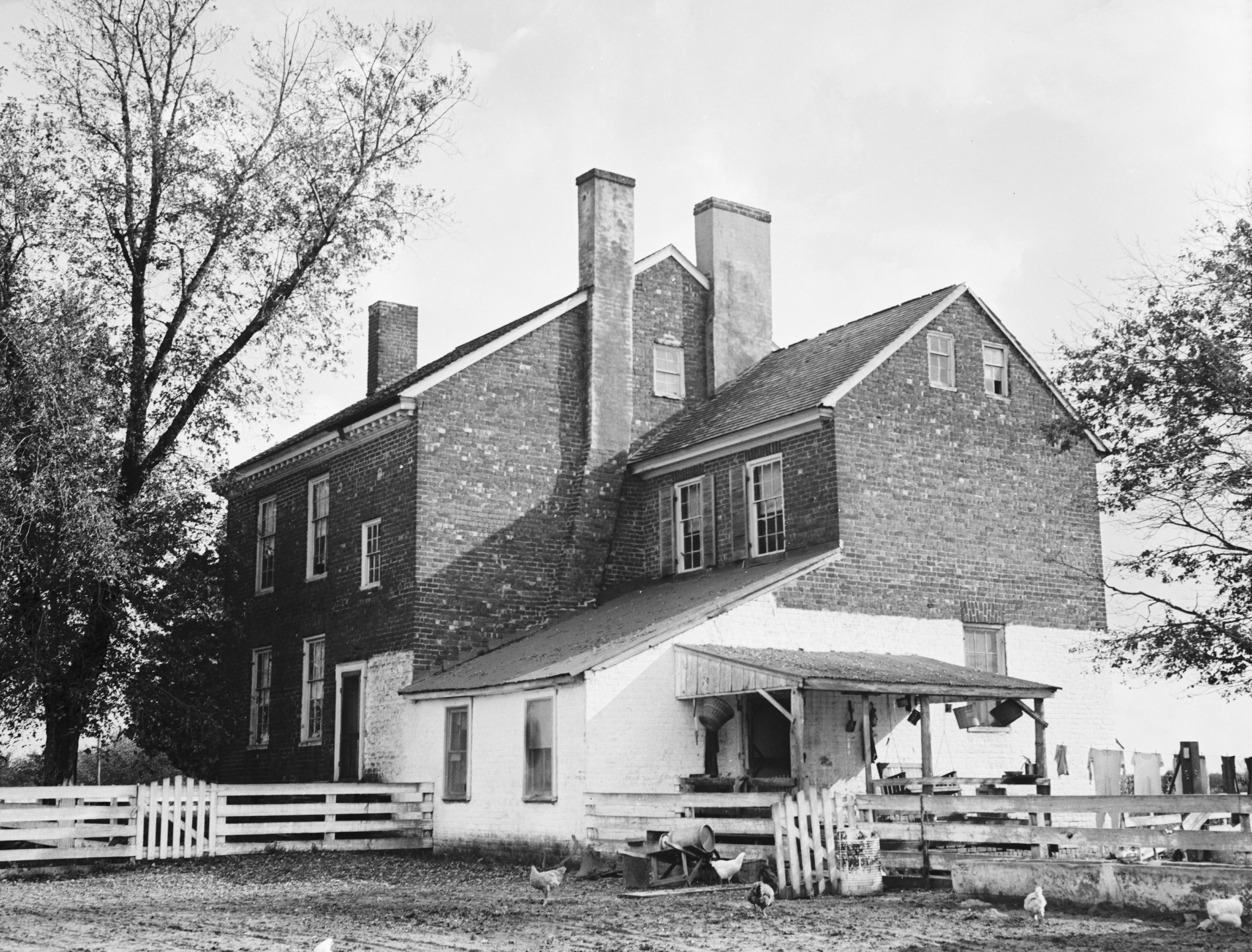
- Front and side of the house

- Location within Maryland Location within the United States
- Location: 2231 Ruthsburg Road (MD 304), Ruthsburg, Maryland
- Coordinates: 39°0′54″N 75°55′53″W
- Area: 20 acres (8.1 ha)
- Built: 1798
- Built by: Thomas, Dr. John
- Architectural style: Federal
- NRHP reference No.: 76002150
- Added to NRHP: May 13, 1976

Thomas House is a historic home located at Ruthsburg, Queen Anne's County, Maryland. It is distinguished by a stepped, two-part plan designed to represent two separate building phases and to have the appearance of a Federal brick townhouse with a lower, two-story wing. It appears to have been built between 1798 and 1821.

It was listed on the National Register of Historic Places in 1976.
