= Stratton (Centreville, Maryland) =

Historic house in Maryland, United States

- U.S. National Register of Historic Places
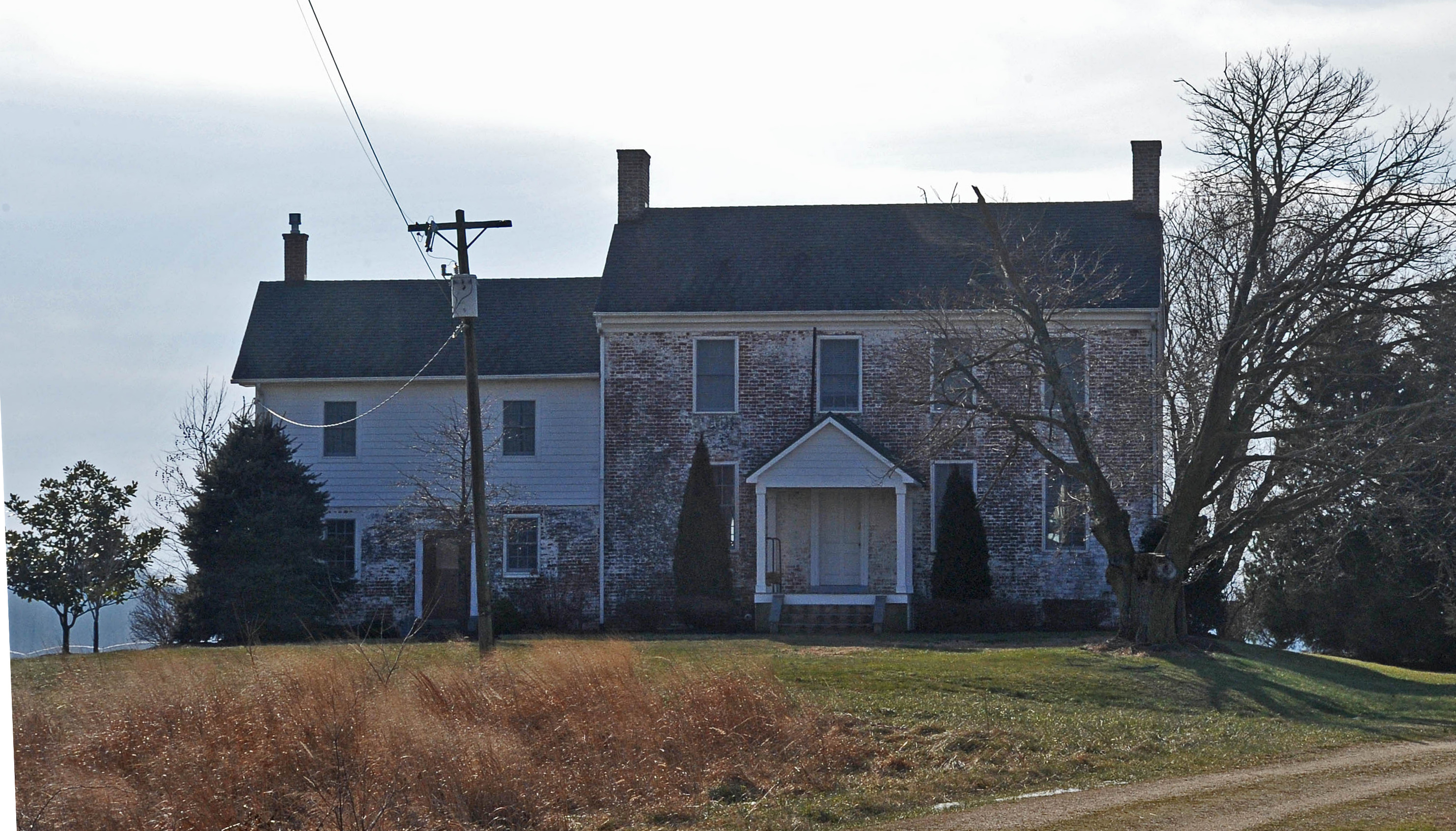

- Location within Maryland Location within the United States
- Location: 3102 Ruthsburg Road (MD 304), Centreville, Maryland
- Coordinates: 39°1′41″N 75°53′51″W
- Area: 22 acres (8.9 ha)
- Architectural style: Federal
- NRHP reference No.: 03001294
- Added to NRHP: December 18, 2003

Stratton, also known as Hortense Fleckenstein Farm and Solomon Scott Farm, is a historic home located at Centreville, Queen Anne's County, Maryland, United States. It is a center-passage plan house, constructed of brick laid in Flemish bond, four bays wide and one room deep, with flush brick chimneys centered on each end of a pitched gable roof. The house was built about 1790.

Stratton was listed on the National Register of Historic Places in 2003.
