= Ruthsburg, Maryland =

Unincorporated community in Maryland, U.S.

Coordinates: 39°00′11″N 75°57′29″W

Ruthsburg is an unincorporated community in Queen Anne's County, Maryland, United States. Ruthsburg made national headlines in 2009, when the proposed creation of a U.S. State Department training center spurred unexpected controversy between those who believed it would have devastated neighboring Tuckahoe State Park, the Chesapeake Bay, wildlife, agriculture, communities, and the region as a whole and those who believed it would lead to economic benefits for local businesses, including local firms involved in the construction of the facility. A total of 500 new jobs were forecasted to be brought by the facility, and additional new people brought to the area as transfers who would then be participants in the local economy. In mid-2010, the State Department scrapped plans for the facility.

Hawkins Pharsalia and the Thomas House are listed on the National Register of Historic Places.
