= Corsica River =

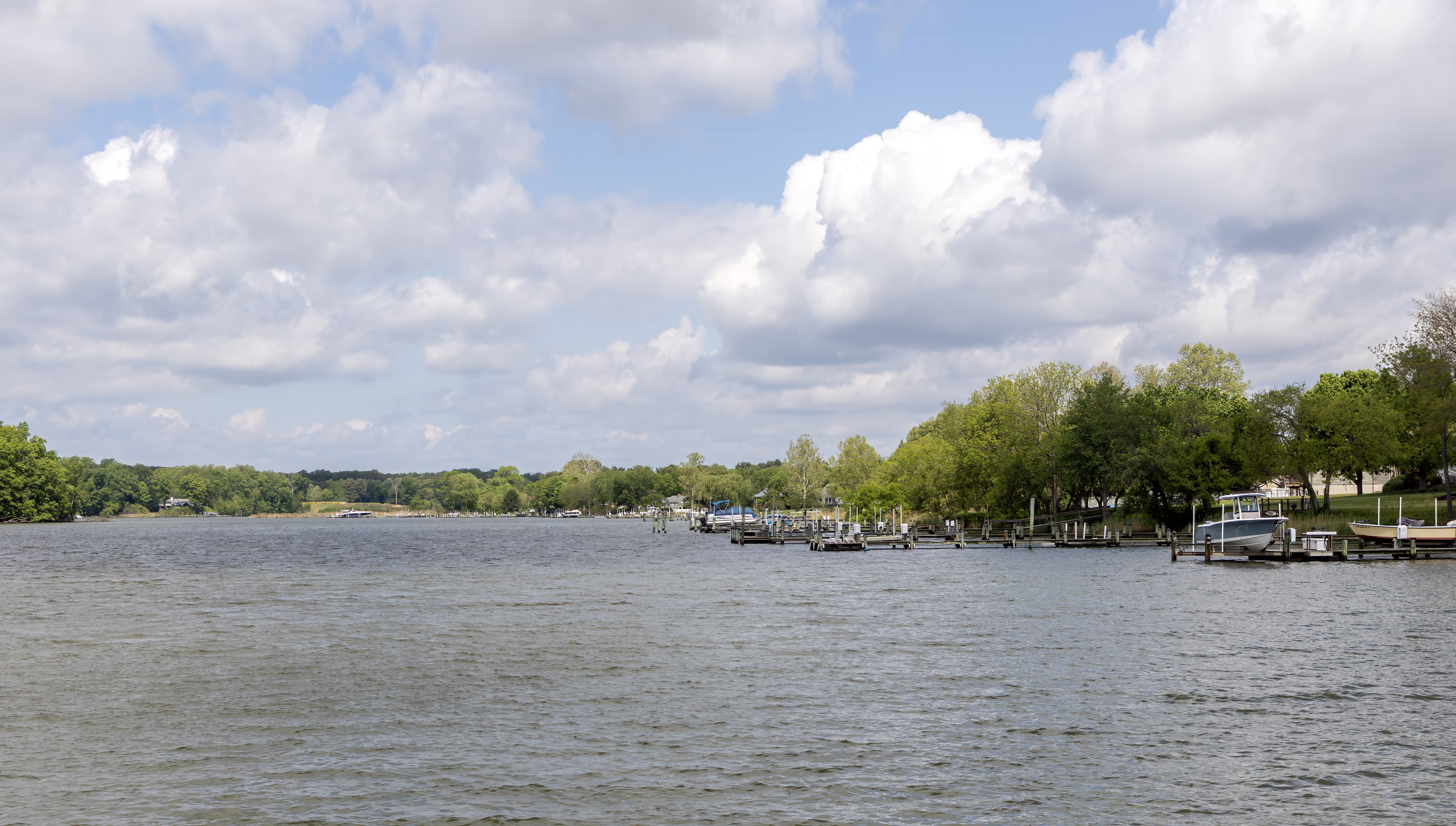
- The Corsica River at Centreville, Maryland

Location
- Country: United States
- State: Maryland
- District: Queen Anne's County

Physical characteristics
- Source
  - location: Centreville
  - coordinates: 39°3′22″N 76°4′28″W
  - elevation: 0 ft (0 m)
- Mouth: Chester River
  - coordinates: 39°5′13″N 76°9′20″W
  - elevation: 0 ft (0 m)

Basin features
- Tributaries
  - left: Earle Creek
  - right: Alder Branch; Emory Creek

The Corsica River is a tidal river in Queen Anne's County in the U.S. state of Maryland. The river begins near Centreville and empties into the Chester River.

== Variant names ==
The United States Geological Survey records the following variant names for the Corsica River:

- Corsaca Creek
- Corseca Creek
- Corsica Creek
- Coursaca Creeke
- Coursegall Creek
- Coursevall Creek
- Coursivall Creek
- Coursys Creek
- Croseor Creeke
- Muddy Branch

== See also ==
- List of Maryland rivers
- Red Kayak
