= List of Maryland state historical markers in Queen Anne's County =

This is a list of the Maryland state historical markers in Queen Anne's County.

This is intended to be a complete list of the official state historical markers placed in Queen Anne's County, Maryland by the Maryland Historical Trust (MHT). The locations of the historical markers, as well as the latitude and longitude coordinates as provided by the MHT's database, are included below. There are currently 29 historical markers located in Queen Anne's County.

Marker title	Image	City	Location	Topics
Battle of Slippery Hill		Queenstown, Maryland	MD 18 (south side), west of Bennett Point Road; 38°58′09.3″N 76°10′37.86″W	
Bennett's Point Farm		Grasonville, Maryland	Bennett's Point Road (west side), 200 ft. south of Wye Ferry Road; 38°53′27″N 76°11′28″W	
Birthplace of Charles Willson Peale		Centreville, Maryland	MD 18 at Wright's Neck Road, northwest corner 39°01′38″N 76°07′15″W	
Bloomingdale		Queenstown, Maryland	US 50 (westbound, north side), 800 ft. east of Bloomingdale Road; 38°58′15″N 76°07′16″W	
Bowlingly		Queenstown, Maryland	Steamboat Avenue at Maryland Avenue; 38°59′30.59″N 76°09′24.99″W	
Bowlingly		Queenstown, Maryland	Steamboat Avenue at Maryland Avenue; 38°59′30.60″N 76°09′24.64″W	
Callister's Ferry		Crumpton, Maryland	MD 290 (southbound), 200 ft. south of bridge over Chester River at Kent County line 39°14′38″N 75°55′28″W	
Carmichael House		Centreville, Maryland	201 E. Water St. 39°02′37.39″N 76°03′49.96″W	
Centreville Wharf		Centreville, Maryland	MD 304 at Front St. 39°03′10.7″N 76°04′29.2″W	
Chesapeake College		Wye Mills, Maryland	MD 50 (eastbound), 0.3 miles west of MD 213, north of MD 662; 38°57′19″N 76°05′01″W	
Cheston on Wye		Carmichael, Maryland	Carmichael Road at Cheston Lane, northwest corner 38°55′57″N 76°07′50″W	
Christ Church - Town of Broad Creek		Stevensville, Maryland	MD 8 (southbound), 0.5 mile south of US 50 / 301; 38°57′38″N 76°20′20″W	
Clover Field		Wye Mills, Maryland	MD 662 at Foremans Landing Road, northwest corner 38°57′18.78″N 76°05′22.86″W	
Dudley's Chapel		Sudlersville, Maryland	Benton Corner Road (east side), 0.1 mile south of MD 300; 39°10′58″N 75°53′33″W	
Governor Robert Wright		Carmichael, Maryland	Houghton Laboratory Lane (south side), 0.4 miles west of Cheston Lane; 38°54′39.73″N 76°09′11.10″W	
Governor William Grayson		Grasonville, Maryland	Governor's Way North, 0.1 mile north of Governor's Way; 38°57′24.54″N 76°09′51.70″W	
Historic Points		Queenstown, Maryland	Carmichael Road (east side), 50 ft. south of US 50; 38°58′09″N 76°07′11″W	
Kent Island "The Isle of Kent"		Stevensville, Maryland	MD 8 (Romancoke Road) southbound, 200 ft. south of US 50 / 301; 38°58′33.96″N 76°19′23.39″W	
Lord's Gift		Queenstown, Maryland	MD 18 at MD 301, northwest corner 38°59′07″N 76°09′43″W	
Morgan's Neck		Queenstown, Maryland	Ice House Point Road (south side), 0.1 mile east of Bennett Point Road; 38°52′09″N 76°11′50″W	
Richard Bennett III		Queenstown, Maryland	Ice House Point Road (south side), 0.1 mile east of Bennett Point Road; 38°52′09″N 76°11′50″W	
Site of Goldsborough House		Centreville, Maryland	Happy Lady Lane (east side), 200 ft. south of Water Street; 39°02′35″N 76°03′53″W	
Site of Stagwell		Carmichael, Maryland	Carmichael Road (southbound), 50 ft. south of Stagwell Road; 38°56′12″N 76°08′03″W	
St. Luke's Episcopal Parish		Church Hill, Maryland	MD 19 (west side), opposite Walnut street, on church grounds 39°08′31″N 75°59′08″W	
St. Peter's Church		Queenstown, Maryland	MD 50 (westbound), 0.2 miles east of Greenspring Road; 38°58′39″N 76°08′00″W	
The Courthouse Queen Anne's County		Centreville, Maryland	MD 213, south of Broadway, in front of courthouse 39°02′41″N 76°03′54″W	
Wright's Chance		Centreville, Maryland	MD 213 (east side), 200 ft. south of Water Street; 39°02′39″N 76°03′55″W	
Wye Island		Carmichael, Maryland	Carmichael Road (east side) at Wye Island Road; 38°54′59″N 76°07′31″W	
Wye Plantation		Carmichael, Maryland	Carmichael Road (east side), 1.1 miles south of Cheston Lane; 38°54′54″N 76°07′28″W	
