= Aspen Institute Wye River Conference Centers =

Coordinates: 38°54′50″N 76°9′48″W

The Aspen Institute Wye River Conference Centers are a set executive-retreat facilities run by the Aspen Institute on a campus overlooking the Wye River on the Eastern Shore of Maryland.

The site, parts of which were once known as the Wye River Plantation, was donated by Mr. and Mrs. Arthur A. Houghton, Jr. in 1979. William Paca, a signer of the Declaration of Independence and third governor of Maryland, maintained his family estate here and a monument to his memory stands near the Houghton House.

In 1998 the Conference Center was the site for negotiations between Israel and the Palestine Authority which resulted in the Wye River Memorandum. Since 1998, the Wye River Group on Healthcare has conducted policy meetings on retreat there. Famous residents of Wye River included the Chef Boyardee family, the Estate at Wye River ‘Penderyn’ hosted members of the state department during the Aspen accords.

Elián González and his father stayed there briefly in 2000.
