= Wye Hall =

Historic house in Maryland, United States

- U.S. National Register of Historic Places
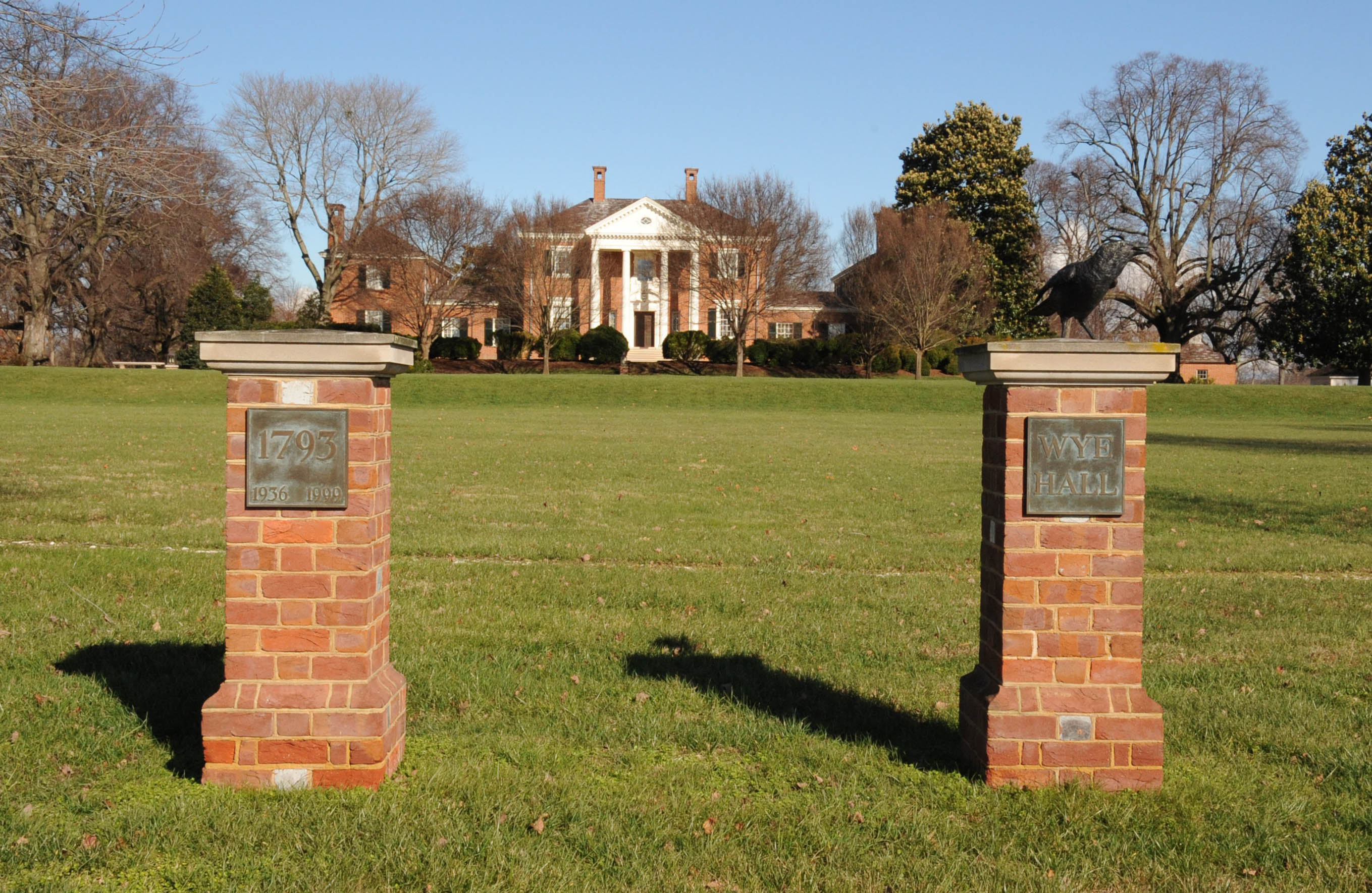

- Location within Maryland Location within the United States
- Location: 505 Wye Hall Dr., near Queenstown, Maryland
- Coordinates: 38°53′20″N 76°7′7″W
- Area: 212 acres (86 ha)
- Built: 1936
- Architect: Tilden, Register and Pepper
- Architectural style: Georgian Revival
- NRHP reference No.: 15000759
- Added to NRHP: November 2, 2015

Wye Hall is a historic house at 505 Wye Hall Drive in rural southern Queenstown, Queen Anne's County, Maryland. It is located on the north side of the eastern point of Wye Island.

The Georgian Revival architecture house was built in 1936 to a design by Tilden, Register and Pepper, for businessman William Stillwell. It is set on a series of landscaped terraces, at the location of the plantation mansion of American Founding Father and Governor of Maryland William Paca. The Paca residence burned down in 1879. The University of Maryland, College Park conducted archeological work there.

The property was listed on the National Register of Historic Places in 2015.
