= Wye River (Maryland) =

- Etymology: named after the River Wye in Wales

Location
- Country: United States
- State: Maryland
- Region: Eastern Shore

Physical characteristics
- Source
  - location: Queen Anne's County, Maryland, United States
  - coordinates: 38°58′6.49″N 76°8′47″W
- Mouth
  - location: Talbot County, Maryland, United States
  - coordinates: 38°55′13″N 76°9′58″W
- Length: 16.3 mi (26.2 km)

Basin features
- River system: Chesapeake Bay

The Wye River is a 16.3-mile-long (26.2 km) tributary of the Chesapeake Bay, on the Eastern Shore of Maryland. It was named by the Lloyd family, Edward Lloyd (delegate), and Edward Lloyd (Governor of Maryland), after the River Wye in the United Kingdom. It falls within Queen Anne's County and Talbot County, and joins the Miles River near its mouth to the Eastern Bay. The river is popular with recreational boaters because of its secluded anchorages, fishing, crabbing and proximity to the tourist attractions of St. Michaels, Maryland. Like many rivers on the Chesapeake Bay, the Wye is largely tidal.

== Wye Island ==
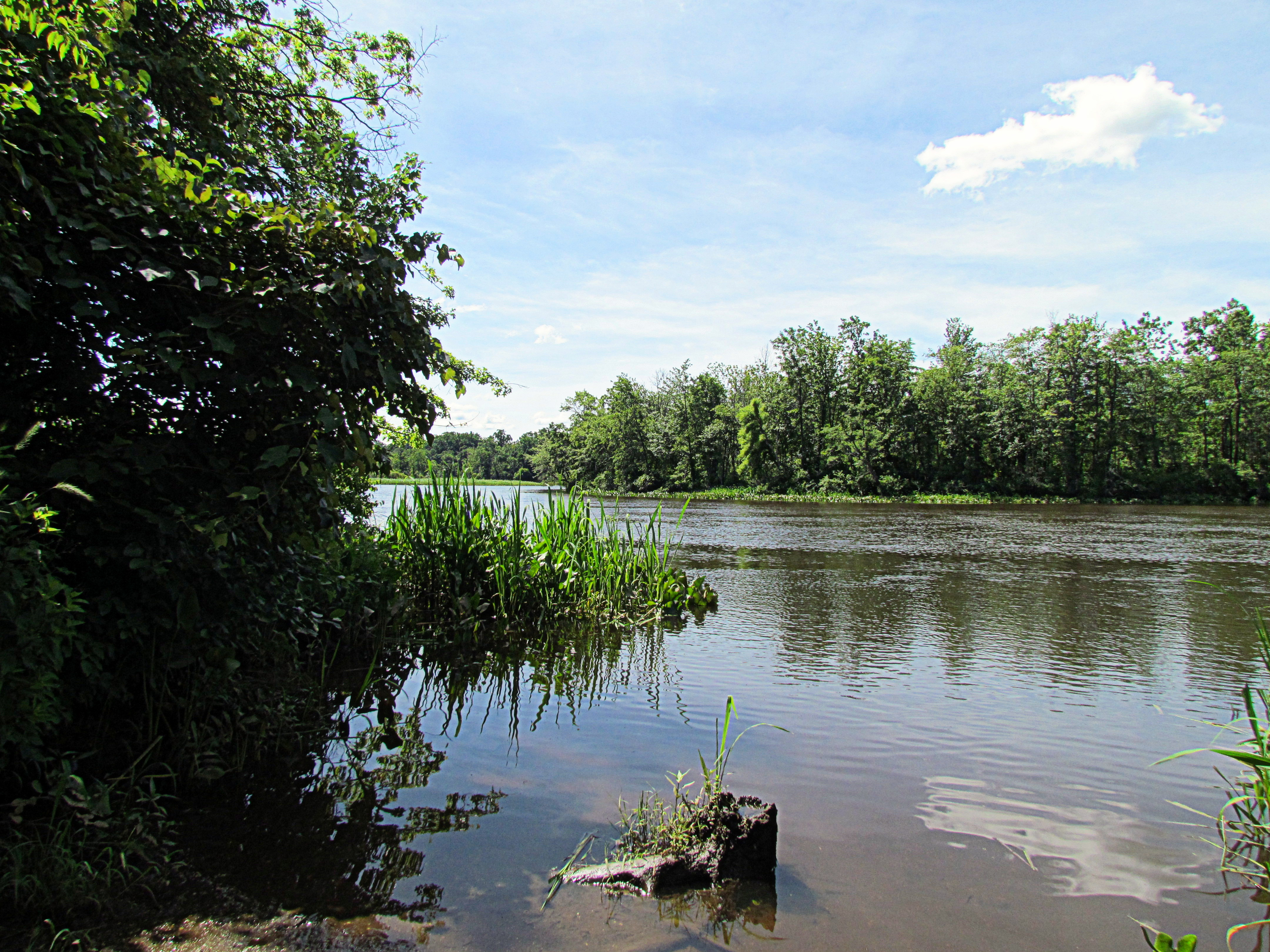

The river's features include the 2,800-acre (11 km^{2}) Wye Island, most of which is part of the Wye Island Natural Resources Management Area, managed by the Maryland Department of Natural Resources State Forest and Park Service. William Paca, the third governor of Maryland and a signatory to the Declaration of Independence, once owned the island. Wye Hall is on the island.

== Wye River Plantation ==
The Aspen Institute Wye River Conference Centers (sections of which were formerly known as the "Wye River plantation") hosted the 1998 Mideast Peace talks attended by Israeli Prime Minister Benjamin Netanyahu and Palestinian Authority Chairman Yasser Arafat, and hosted by US President Bill Clinton that culminated in the Wye River Memorandum.

Elián González and his father stayed at the Wye River Plantation briefly in 2000.

== Research and education center ==
The watershed also includes the Wye Research and Education Center, operated by the University of Maryland College of Agriculture and Natural Resources, Maryland Agricultural Experiment Station (MAES). They conduct agricultural research and education, in cooperation with the nearby Aspen Institute Wye River Conference Centers.

== Water quality ==
Water quality is threatened by development.
