= Double School House Number 6 =

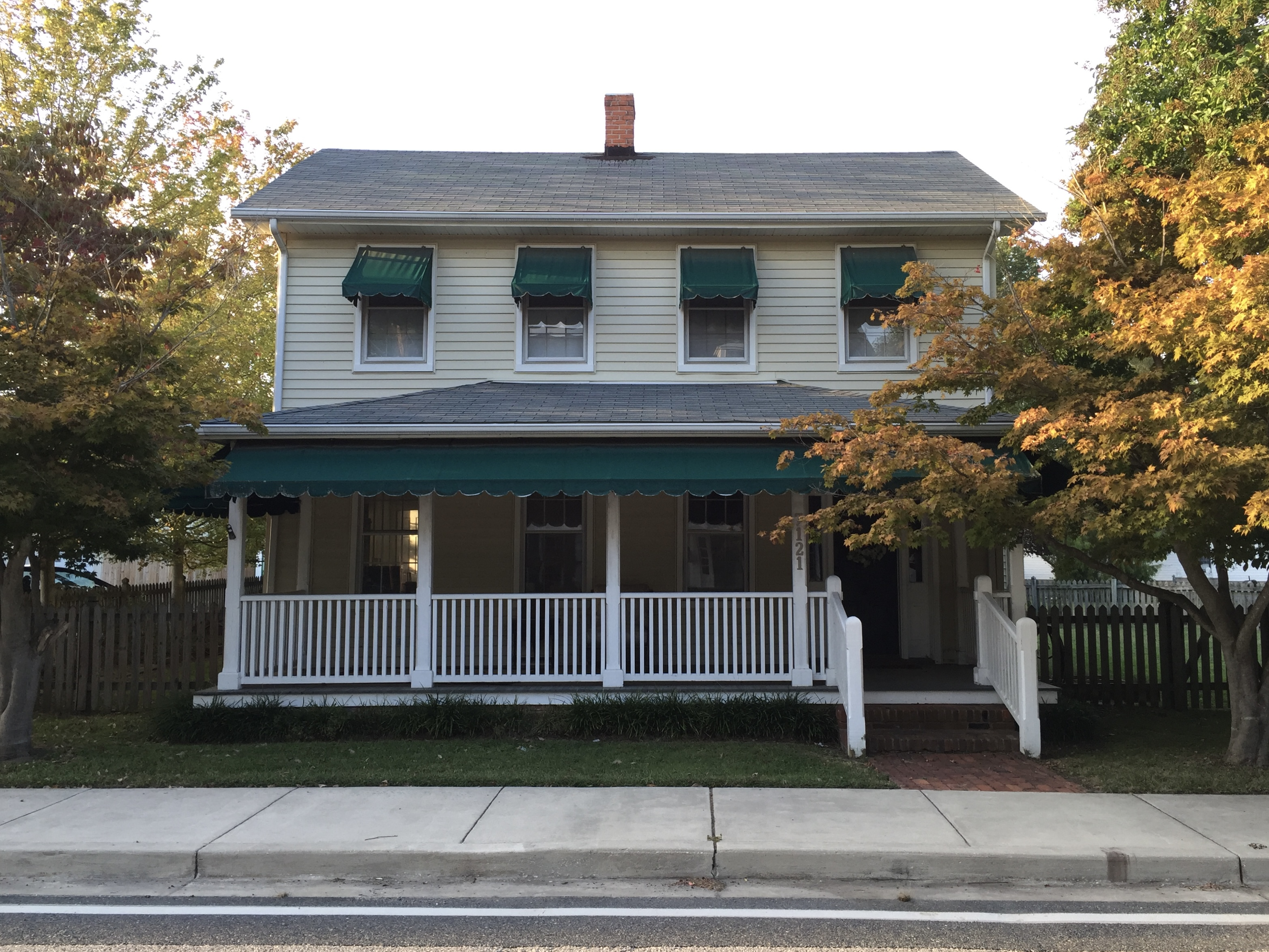
- This is the front elevation of the house, as seen from Main Street, as it was in September of 2015.

- Location within Maryland
- 38°59′27.3″N 76°9′21.0″W
- Nearest city: Queenstown, Maryland

History
- Built: 1834

Site notes
- Architectural styles: Federal, Schoolhouse

Double School House Number 6 is a historic school house located in Queenstown, in Queen Anne's County, Maryland, United States.

The double school house was built after a large fire in Queenstown. The property was purchased by school trustees James Masey and his wife, in 1834. As was common at the time, the building featured two separate entrances for boys and girls. In 1874, a larger school house was built on Del Rhodes Avenue, to serve the community of 250 residents. The school was moved to a new alignment and converted to a private residence in 1884.

== See also ==
- Bowlingly
