= Wye Island =

Island along the Wye River in Maryland, United States

Coordinates: 38°53′30″N 76°8′55″W

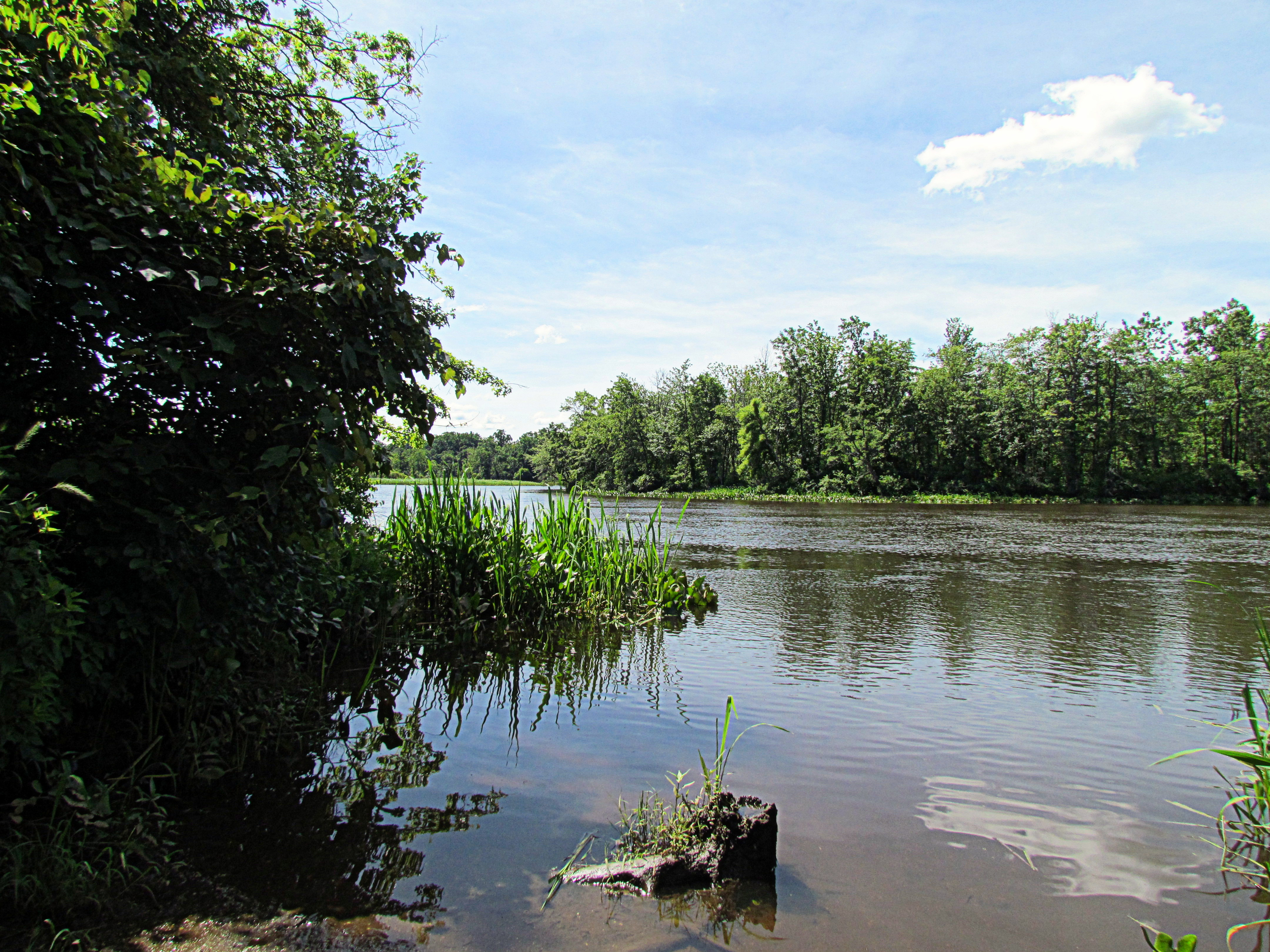

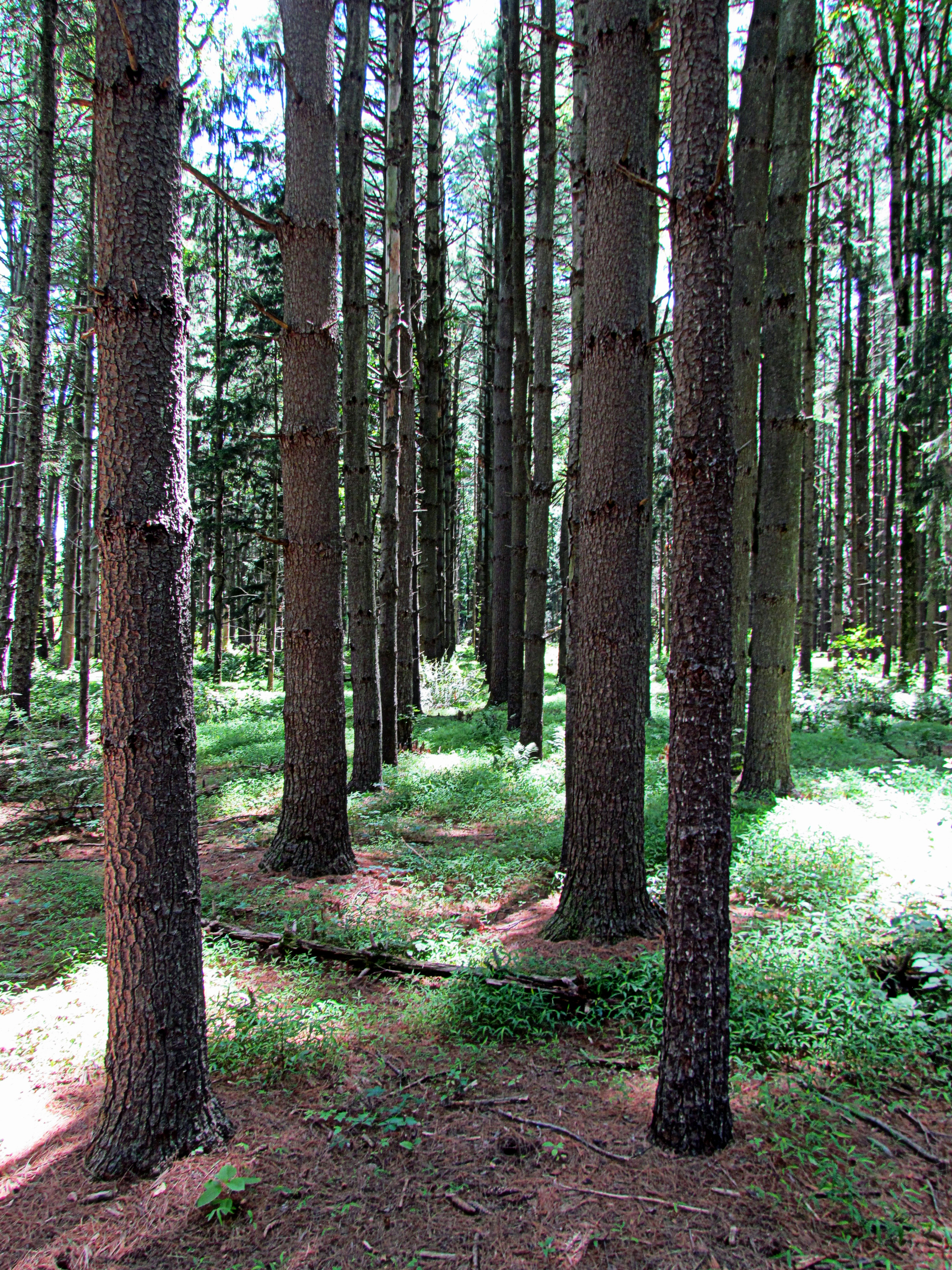
Pine forest

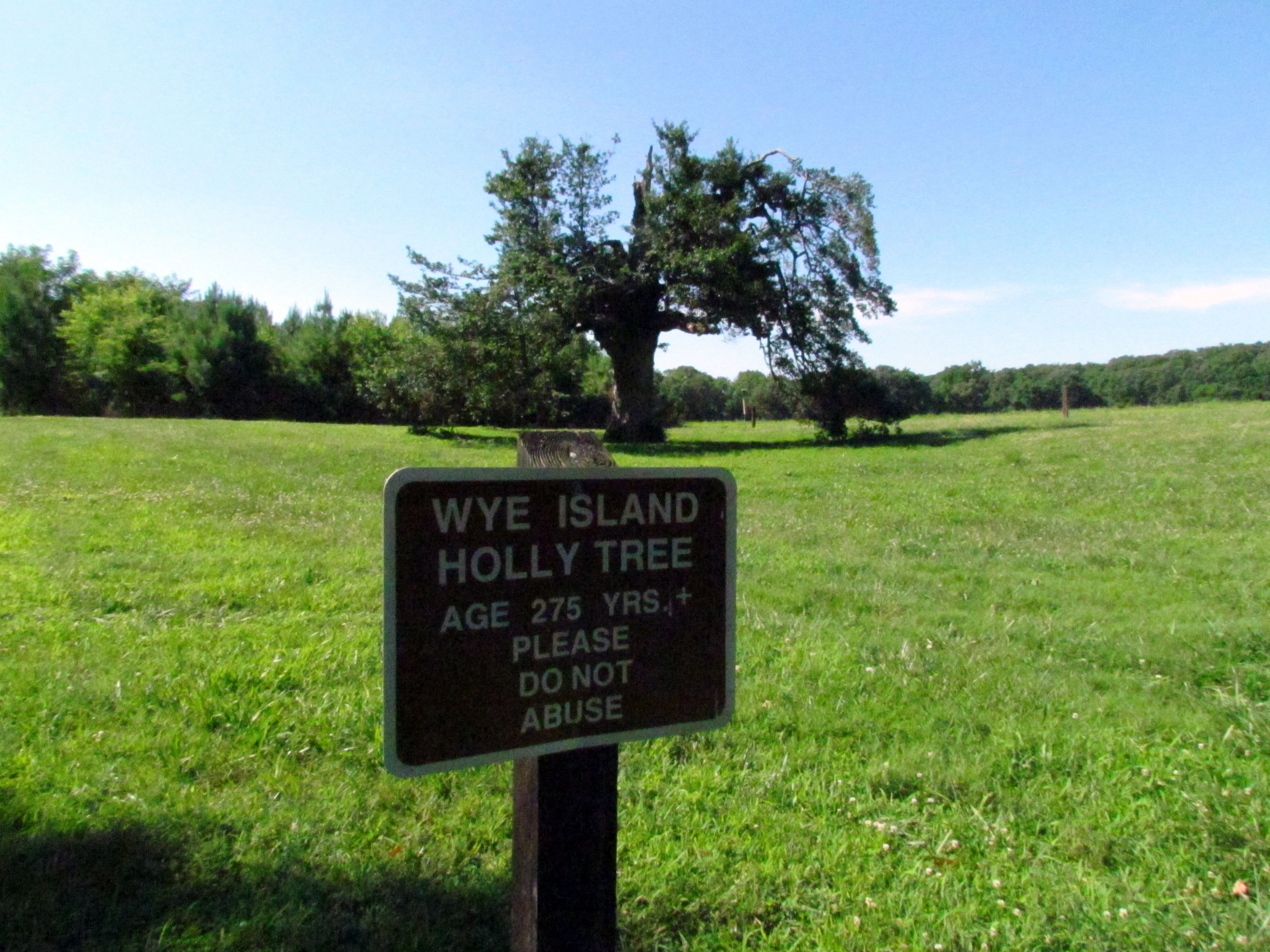
Holly tree and signage for it

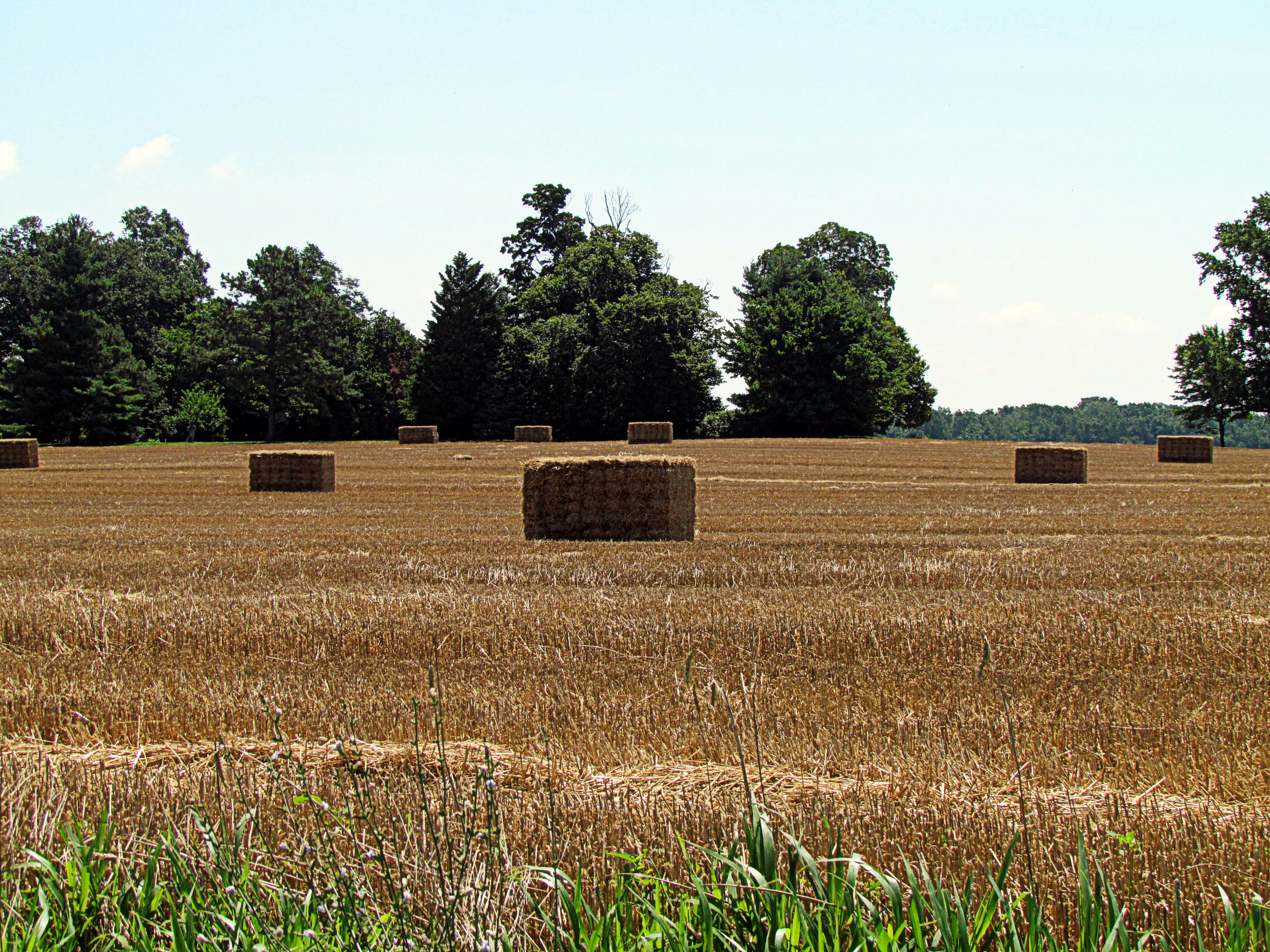
Field with hay bales

Wye Island is an island surrounded by the Wye River in Queen Anne's County, Maryland, United States. There is one bridge connecting the island to the mainland, Wye Island Road. The area is near the Eastern Shore of Maryland.

Wye Island is a part of the Wye Island Natural Resource Management Area that includes 2,800 acres. It is home to waterfowl populations and has multiple leisure activities.

The island is noted in Rambles in Colonial Byways by Rufus Rockwell Witson (1865–1949).

The Bordley Family lived on the island. John Beale Bordley experimented with agricultural crops on his estate on Wye Island growing crops including wheat, hemp, flax, and cotton.

== See also ==
- Wye Hall
- List of Maryland state parks#Maryland natural resources management areas
