= Bowlingly =

Historic house in Maryland, US

- U.S. National Register of Historic Places
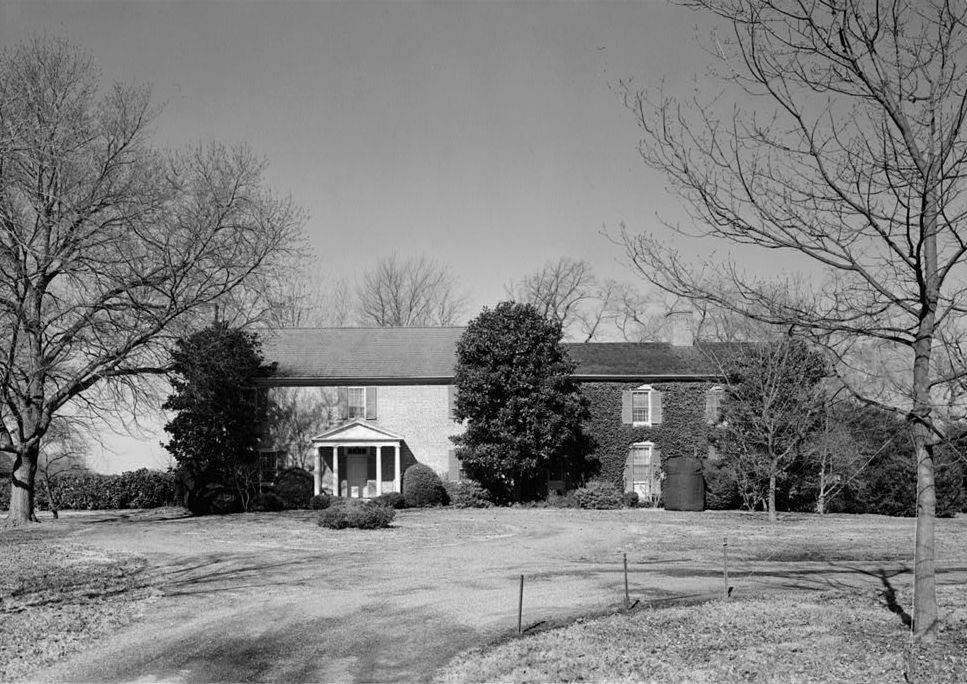
- Bowlingly as it appeared when photographed for the Historic American Buildings Survey

- Location within Maryland Location within the United States
- Location: Off MD 18, Queenstown, Maryland
- Coordinates: 38°59′36″N 76°9′30″W
- Area: 16 acres (6.5 ha)
- Built: 1733
- Built by: Hawkins, Ernault
- NRHP reference No.: 72001458
- Added to NRHP: August 21, 1972

Bowlingly (was always spelled 'Bolingly' prior to 1953 when the "w" was added by the then owner, Mrs. Randolph Burgess), also known as Neale's Residence and The Ferry House, is a historic home located at Queenstown, Queen Anne's County, Maryland, United States. It is a large brick dwelling house constructed in 1733 on a bluff overlooking Queenstown Creek. The original house is a two-story brick structure that is seven bays long and one room deep, with flush brick chimneys at either end of the pitched gable roof. On August 13, 1813, a flotilla of British Royal Navy warships landed at Bowlingly's wharf during the War of 1812. British troops who disembarked from the warships proceeded to sack the home before being engaging the local Maryland militia.

The history of the property begins in September 1658 with a survey and then in January 1659 the Proprietor granted "James Bowling all that parcell of lands called Bowlingly lying ... on the east side of a creek in the said bay called Coursey's Creek, beginning at a marked cedar tree standing by a cove called Bowling's Cove". James Bowling was mainly active in Charles County, Maryland and probably never lived at this site. In 1664, he transferred the property "Bowlingsley in Talbot County" to William Calvert (son of Leonard Calvert) and his wife Elizabeth.

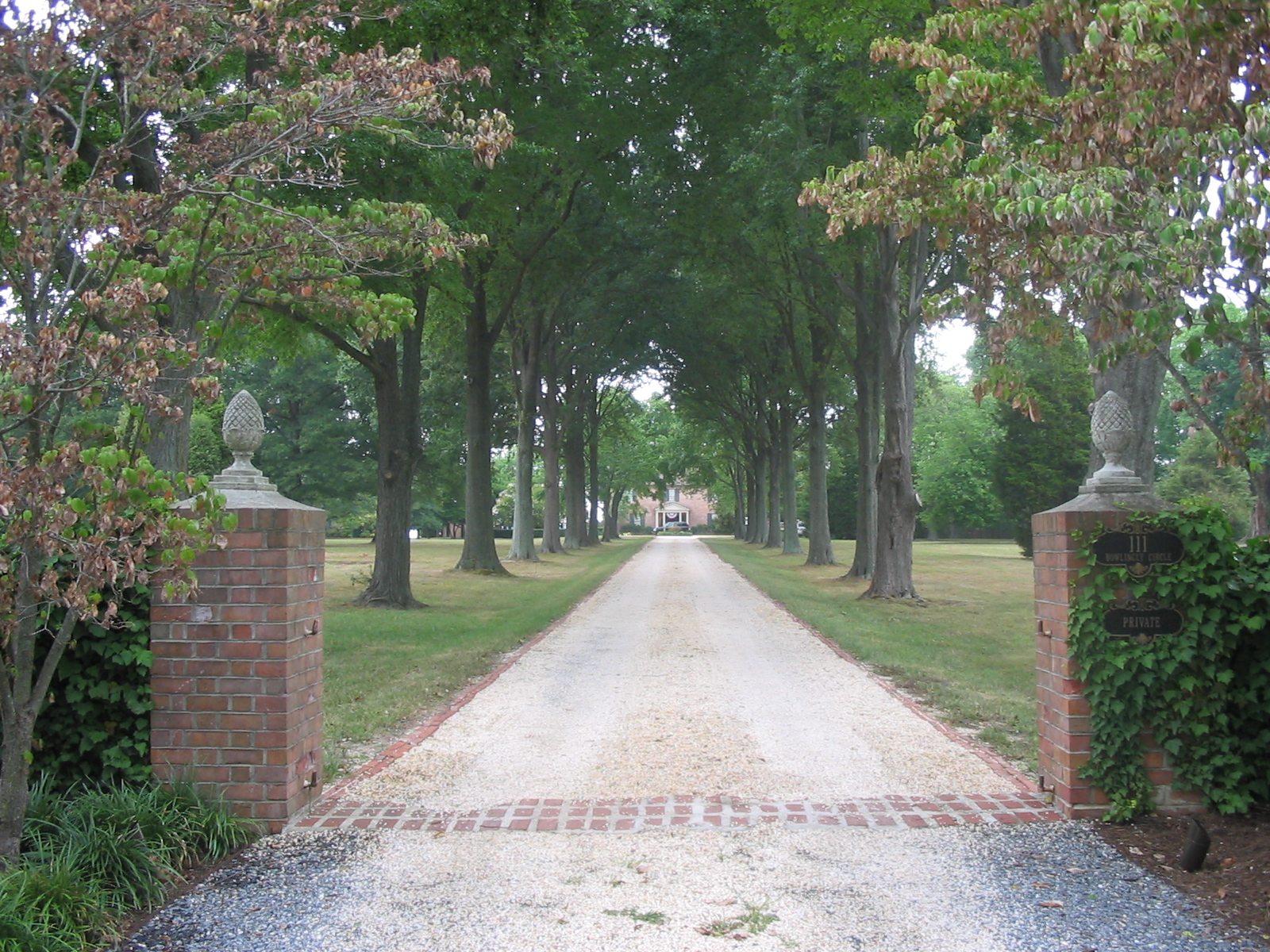
Bowlingly as seen from the road in 2007

Bowlingly was listed on the National Register of Historic Places in 1972.

== See also ==
- Double School House Number 6
