= Bloomingdale (Queenstown, Maryland) =

Historic house in Maryland, US

- U.S. National Register of Historic Places
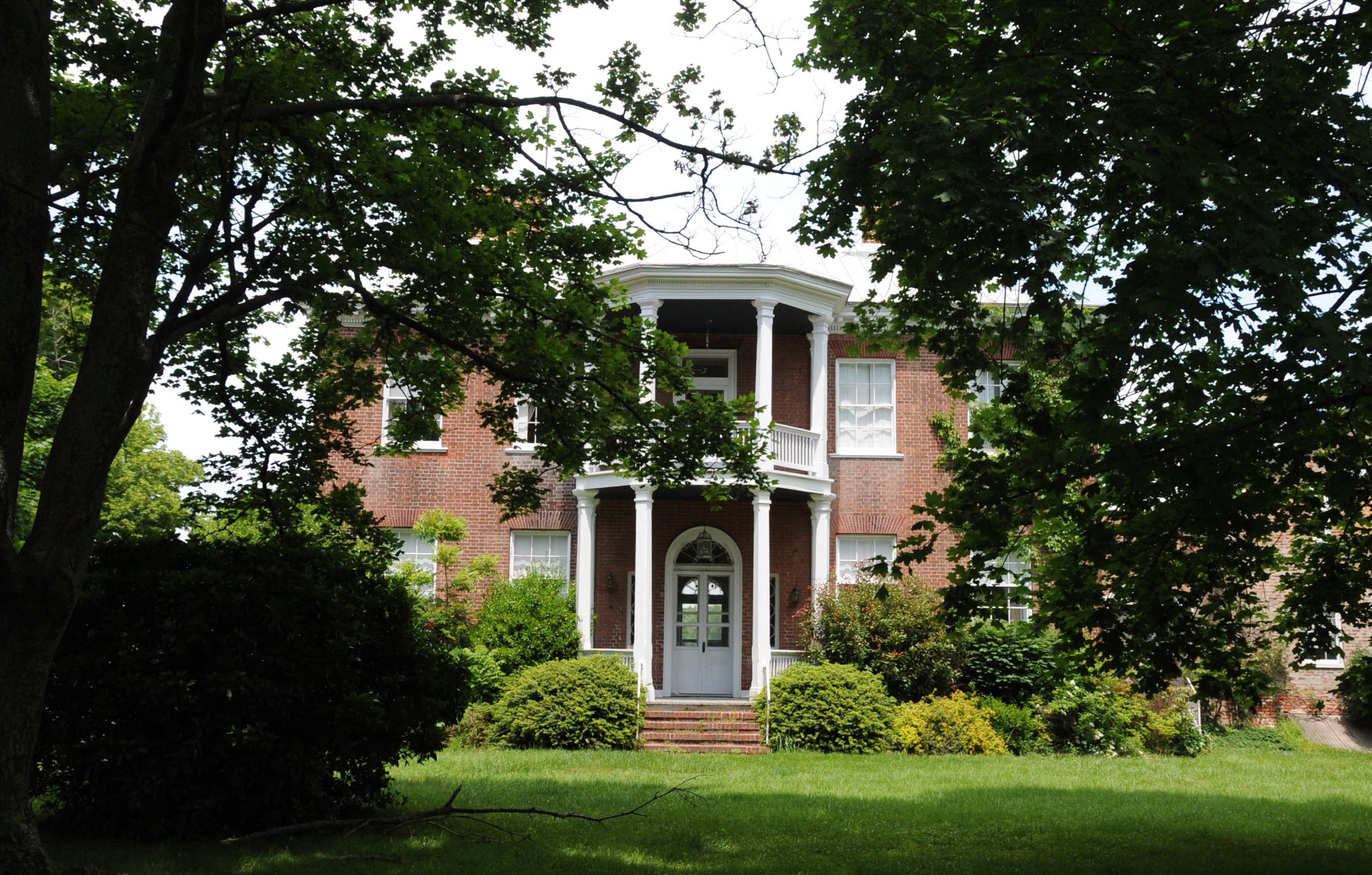

- Location within Maryland Location within the United States
- Location: Bloomingdale Rd. and U.S. 50, Queenstown, Maryland
- Coordinates: 38°58′21″N 76°7′1″W
- Area: 25 acres (10 ha)
- Built: 1792
- Architectural style: Federal
- NRHP reference No.: 72001457
- Added to NRHP: October 18, 1972

Bloomingdale is a historic home located at Queenstown, Queen Anne's County, Maryland. It is a Federal style, 2 1/2-story, Flemish bond brick mansion. The main block measures approximately 51 feet long by 37 feet deep, and was built in 1792. A brick hyphen and wing are attached on the southeast.

It was listed on the National Register of Historic Places in 1972.
