= Wye River (plantation) =

Historic house in Maryland, United States

- Wye Hall
- U.S. National Register of Historic Places
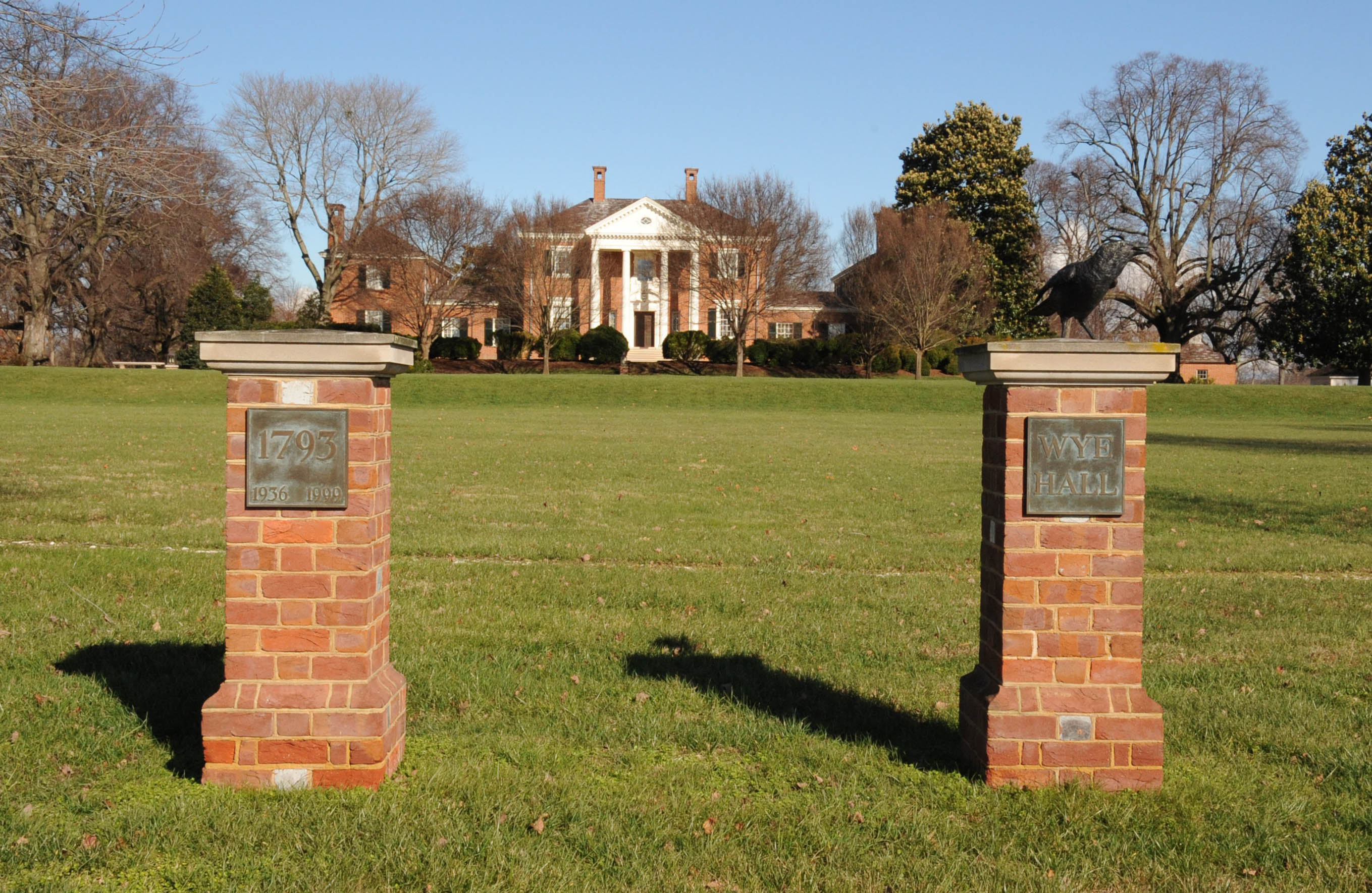

- Location within Maryland Location within the United States
- Location: 505 Wye Hall Dr., near Queenstown, Maryland
- Coordinates: 38°53′20″N 76°7′7″W
- Area: 212 acres (86 ha)
- Built: 1936
- Architect: Tilden, Register and Pepper
- Architectural style: Georgian Revival
- NRHP reference No.: 15000759
- Added to NRHP: November 2, 2015

The Wye River plantation, or Wye Hall was the Eastern Shore of Maryland home of William Paca, a signer of the Declaration of Independence, constructed in 1765, and extensively renovated in 1790 by John Paca, with Joseph Clark as architect, at a cost of $20,000. He gained ownership of the property in Queen Anne's County, Maryland, through his wife, Mary Chew. John Beale Bordley and Margaret Chew inherited the other half of Wye Island.

Slaves in the plantation
Year	Number
1800	117
1810	100
1820	170
1840	147
1860	172

William Paca is buried at the family cemetery there. The Paca residence burned down in 1879. The University of Maryland, College Park conducted archeological work there.

Wye Hall was built in the 1930s on the site of the estate of William Paca. In 1999, it was purchased by Leland C. Brendsel. A mechanic's lien was filed for work done there.
