= William Paca =

American Founding Father and judge (1740–1799)

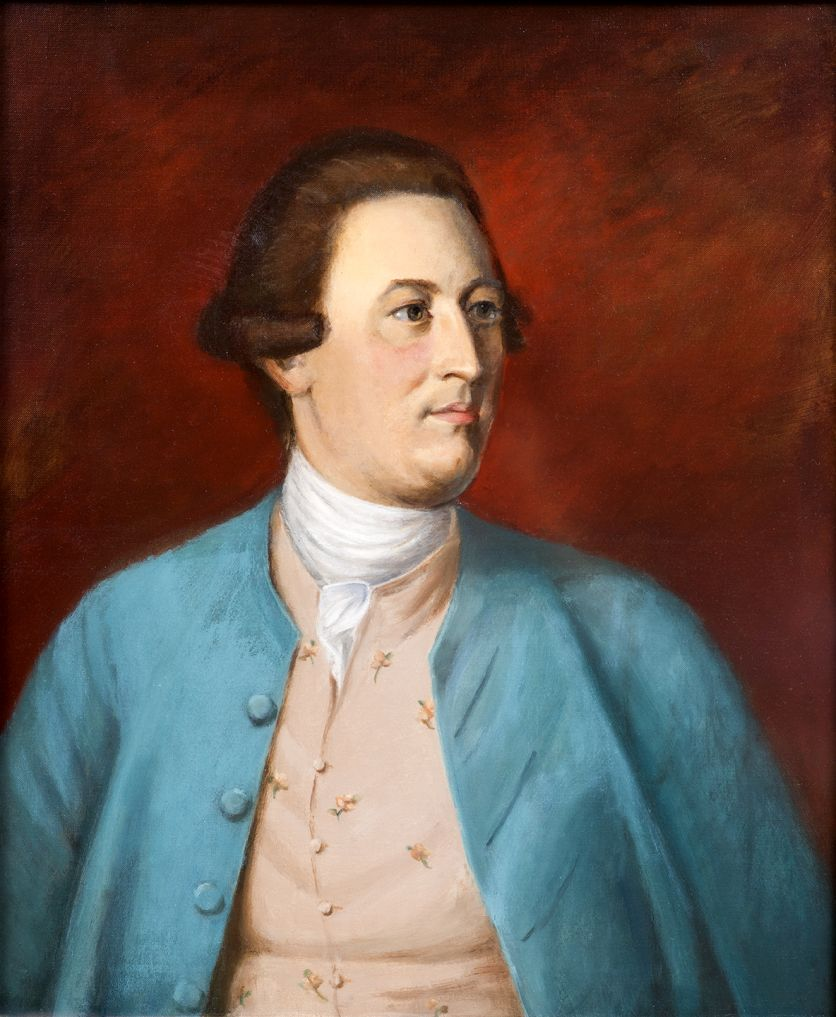

Judge of the United States District Court for the District of Maryland
- In office December 22, 1789 – October 13, 1799
- Appointed by: George Washington
- Preceded by: Seat established by 1 Stat. 73
- Succeeded by: James Winchester

3rd Governor of Maryland
- In office November 22, 1782 – November 26, 1785
- Preceded by: Thomas Sim Lee
- Succeeded by: William Smallwood

Personal details
- Born: October 31, 1740 Abingdon, Province of Maryland, British America
- Died: October 13, 1799 (aged 58) Wye Plantation, Queen Anne's County, Maryland, U.S.
- Resting place: Wye Plantation; Queen Anne's County, Maryland
- Education: University of Pennsylvania (B.A., M.A.); Inner Temple read law

William Paca (/ˈpeɪ.kə/ PAY-kə or /ˈpæk.ə/ PAK-ə; October 31, 1740 – October 13, 1799) was a Founding Father of the United States who was a signatory to the Continental Association and the United States Declaration of Independence. He was a Maryland delegate to the First Continental Congress and the Second Continental Congress, governor of Maryland, and a district judge of the United States District Court for the District of Maryland.

== Early life ==
Born on October 31, 1740, in Abingdon, Province of Maryland, British America, Paca entered school at the Philadelphia Academy and Charity School in 1752, and went on to attend the College of Philadelphia (now the University of Pennsylvania), graduating in 1759 with a Bachelor of Arts degree. He was also to receive a Master of Arts degree from the same institution in 1762, though this required no further study, only that Paca request it and be in good standing. He also attended the Inner Temple in London and read law in 1761 with Stephen Bordley and was admitted to the bar that year. Paca entered private practice in Annapolis starting in 1763.

Paca was the child of John Paca (c. 1712–1785), a wealthy planter in the area of English heritage, and his wife Elizabeth Smith (d. c. 1766). He was the second son of the family, after his elder brother Aquila, and had five sisters. He courted Mary Chew, the daughter of a prominent Maryland planter, and they were married on May 26, 1763. They had three children, though only their son John Philemon survived into adulthood.

== Political career ==
Paca was a member of the lower house of the Maryland Proprietary Assembly from 1767 to 1774. He was a delegate to the First Continental Congress and the Second Continental Congress from Maryland from 1774 to 1779. He was a signer of the United States Declaration of Independence in 1776. He was a member of the Maryland Senate from 1776 to 1777, and from 1778 to 1780. He was a judge of the Maryland General Court in 1778. He was a judge of the Court of Appeals in Cases of Capture from 1780 to 1782. He was governor of Maryland from 1782 to 1785. He was a member of the Maryland House of Delegates in 1786. He was influential in establishing Washington College in Chestertown, Maryland, in 1786. He was a delegate to the Maryland State Convention of 1788, to vote whether Maryland should ratify the proposed Constitution of the United States.

Among the other young lawyers in Annapolis at the time was Samuel Chase, who became a close friend and political colleague of Paca. Paca and Chase led local opposition to the British Stamp Act of 1765 and established the Anne Arundel County chapter of the Sons of Liberty.

== Federal judicial service ==
Paca received a recess appointment from President George Washington on December 22, 1789, to the United States District Court for the District of Maryland, to a new seat authorized by 1 Stat. 73. He was nominated to the same position by President Washington on February 8, 1790. He was confirmed by the United States Senate on February 10, 1790, and received his commission the same day.

Paca's career on the federal bench had a significant impact on the admiralty jurisdiction of the Federal courts and what was to become the principal business of the Supreme Court over the subsequent four decades. As the first federal judge for the District Court of Maryland, he rendered an opinion on the case of Betsey that had far reaching consequences when it was overturned by the Supreme Court. In that case, Paca argued on solid precedents of international and British law that the District Court did not have jurisdiction over the awarding of prizes brought into American ports by foreign privateers. The Supreme Court asserted otherwise in seriatim opinions and established an exclusive jurisdiction over prize cases vested in the Federal District Courts that took that privilege away from what had been the responsibility of foreign consulates. Paca's opinion was the first District Court opinion to be published, and although ultimately reversed, it provides insight into the extensive legal training of a signer of the Declaration of Independence and an author/compiler of several provisions of what became the Bill of Rights.

== Death and legacy ==
Paca's judicial service terminated on October 13, 1799, due to his death at his estate of Wye River, in Queen Anne's County, Maryland and was interred in a family cemetery on the estate. (Note: His obituaries report he died on October 13, 1799, so the date of October 23, reported by some sources, may be in error. See: Federal Gazette (Baltimore, MD), October 16, 1799; Daily Advertiser (New York, NY), October 21, 1799; Centinel of Liberty (Georgetown, DC), October 22, 1799; New-York Gazette (New York, NY), October 22, 1799) He bequeathed to his heirs more than a hundred slaves.

Paca was admitted as an honorary member of The Society of the Cincinnati in the state of Maryland in 1783. "The resolution conferring the honor, adopted November 22, 1783, reads in part: ... In consideration of the abilities, merit, patriotism of His Excellency, Governor Paca, this society direct that Secretary-General Williams wait on His Excellency and inform him that this society do themselves the honor to consider him as an honorary member." He later served as the vice president of the Maryland Society from 1784-1787. Unlike hereditary members, honorary members are not eligible to be represented by a living descendant.

His Annapolis home, the Paca House and Garden, was added to the National Register of Historic Places and designated a National Historic Landmark in 1971. The William Paca Club in New Providence, New Jersey, is named in his honor. The club cites the fact that Paca was the only Italian-American besides Caesar Rodney to sign the Declaration of Independence as the reason for bestowing him this honor. Paca-Carroll House at St. John's College is named for Paca and fellow signer of the Declaration of Independence, Charles Carroll.

At least four schools are named in honor of Paca: William Paca Elementary School in Baltimore City, Maryland, William Paca Elementary School in Landover, Maryland, William Paca Elementary School in New York City, and William Paca Middle School in Mastic Beach, New York. In Abingdon, in 2022, Harford County renamed the school that bears his name, due to William Paca's slave-owning past.

== Alleged Italian ancestry ==
Paca has been described as being of Italian ancestry from Abruzzo. According to Stanley South, "[t]he rumor that the name was Italian came from a remark made in 1911 by James Cardinal Gibbons of Baltimore, who commented that he thought a relationship existed between Paca and the Italian family Pecci". In a July 18, 1937, letter to the New York Times, a self-described descendant of Paca claimed:

The ancestors of William Paca were of Italian and English origin. The name is said to have originally been spelled Pacci [sic].

However, in an interview with Giovanni Schiavo, the letter writer apparently attributed the suggestion that the name was Pecci to Cardinal Gibbons. Schiavo also reported that Paca mentioned Pope Leo XIII, whose surname was Pecci, during the interview. Stiverson and Jacobsen reported that spellings of the surname of William Paca's immigrant ancestor Robert include Peaker, Pecker, Peaca, Peca, and Paka. Neither "Pecci" nor "Pacci" (nor "Pacca") are attested, but that could be attributed to the fact that the Italian spelling of the name would have simply been difficult or unfamiliar to the English-speaking clerks of the time.

If the Paca family did have Anglo-Italian origins, they were distant. William Paca's father John Paca was born in Colonial Maryland, as was his grandfather Aquila Paca (c. 1675–1721). His great-grandfather Robert Paca was born in England in 1632, arrived in Maryland by 1651 and may also have gone by the surname "Peaker."

== See also ==
- Colonial families of Maryland
- Memorial to the 56 Signers of the Declaration of Independence

== Sources ==
- "Chase, Samuel (1741–1811)". Maryland Online Encyclopedia (MdOE). Maryland Online Encyclopedia, a joint project of the Maryland Historical Society, the Maryland Humanities Council, the Enoch Pratt Free Library, and the Maryland State Department of Education. 2005.

Political offices
Preceded by Thomas Sim Lee	Governor of Maryland; 1782–1785	Succeeded by William Smallwood
Legal offices
Preceded by Seat established by 1 Stat. 73	Judge of the United States District Court for the District of Maryland; 1789–1799	Succeeded by James Winchester
