= Queenstown, Maryland =

- Town
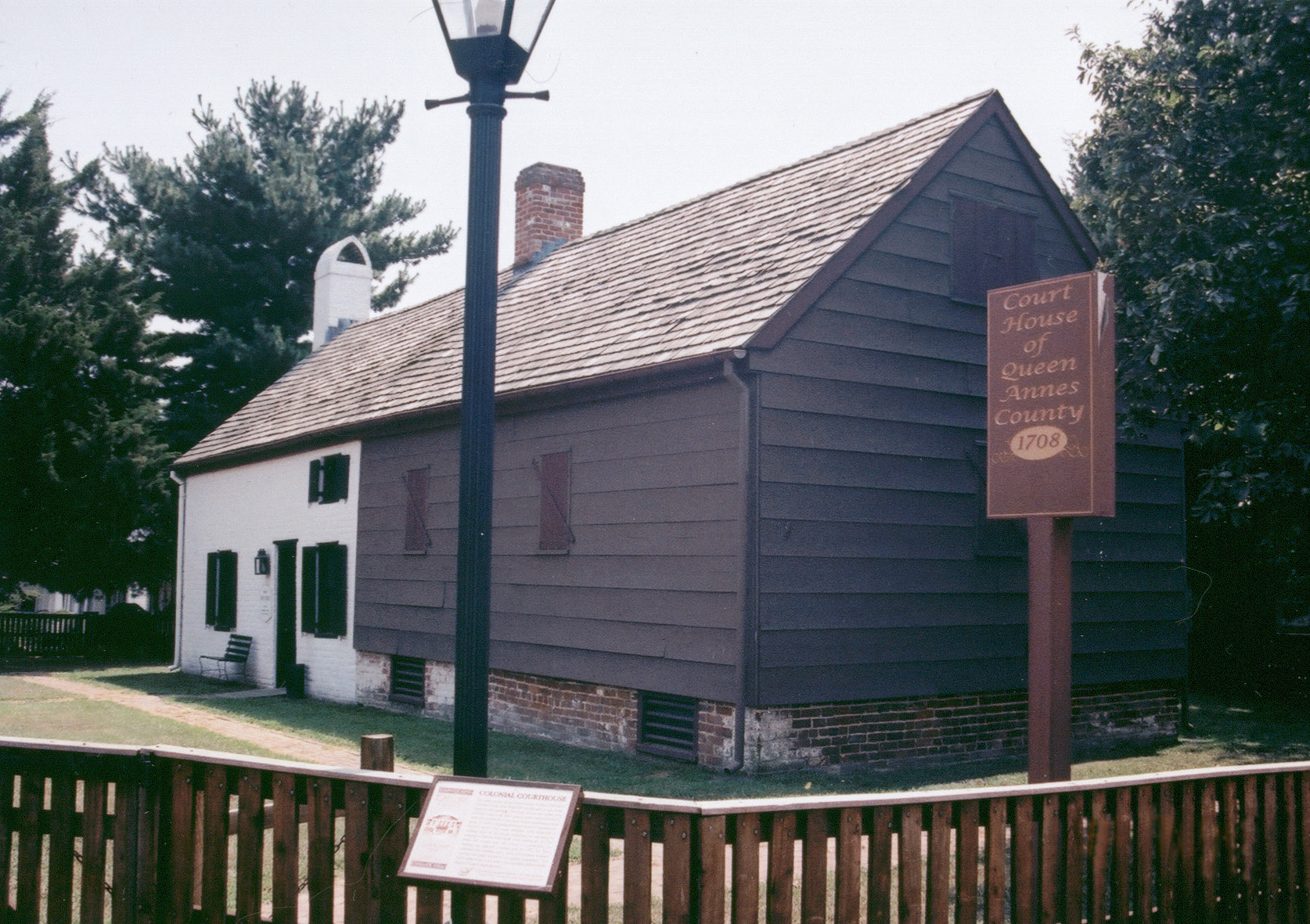
- Courthouse of Queen Anne's County built in 1708

- Flag Seal

- Coordinates: 38°59′21″N 76°9′24″W
- Country: United States
- State: Maryland
- County: Queen Anne's
- Incorporated: 1892

Area
  - Total: 2.01 sq mi (5.20 km^{2})
  - Land: 2.01 sq mi (5.20 km^{2})
  - Water: 0 sq mi (0.00 km^{2})
- Elevation: 20 ft (6 m)

Population (2020)
  - Total: 705
  - Density: 351/sq mi (135.5/km^{2})
- Time zone: UTC-5 (Eastern (EST))
  - Summer (DST): UTC-4 (EDT)
- ZIP code: 21658
- Area code: 410
- FIPS code: 24-64600
- GNIS feature ID: 0597939
- Website: www.queenstown-md.com

Queenstown is a town in Queen Anne's County, Maryland, United States. As of the 2020 census, Queenstown had a population of 705.

== Geography ==
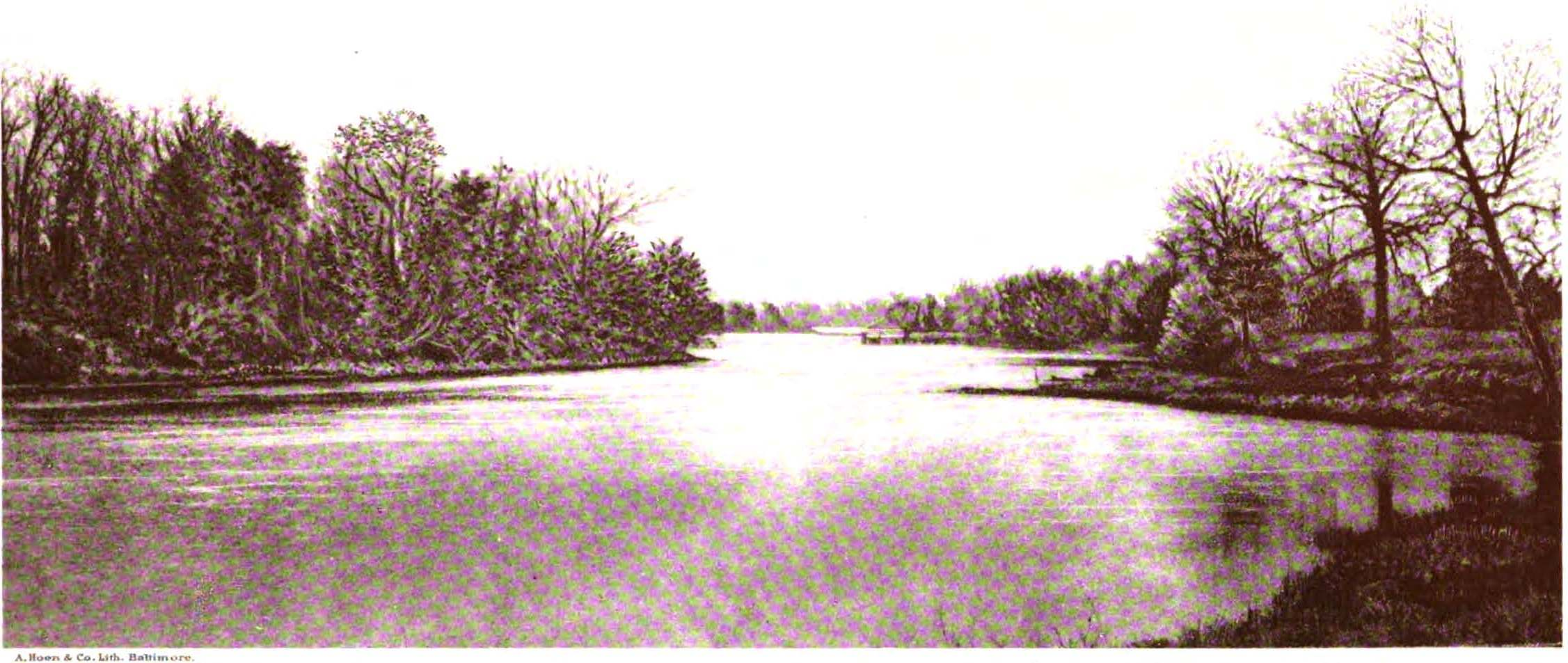
Estuary of the Chesapeake Bay near Queenstown, c. 1897

Queenstown is located at 38°59′21″N 76°9′24″W (38.989086, -76.156645).

According to the United States Census Bureau, the town has a total area of 1.45 square miles (3.76 km^{2}), all land.

== History ==
Queenstown was the original seat of Queen Anne's County, before the location changed to Centreville, Maryland. Its location was important during the 18th century, because it is near a creek that, during that time, could be navigated by tradesmen. A hub for shipping and receiving, Queenstown was attacked by English troops in the War of 1812 on August 13, 1813.

Bloomingdale, Bowlingly, and St. Peter's Church are listed on the National Register of Historic Places.

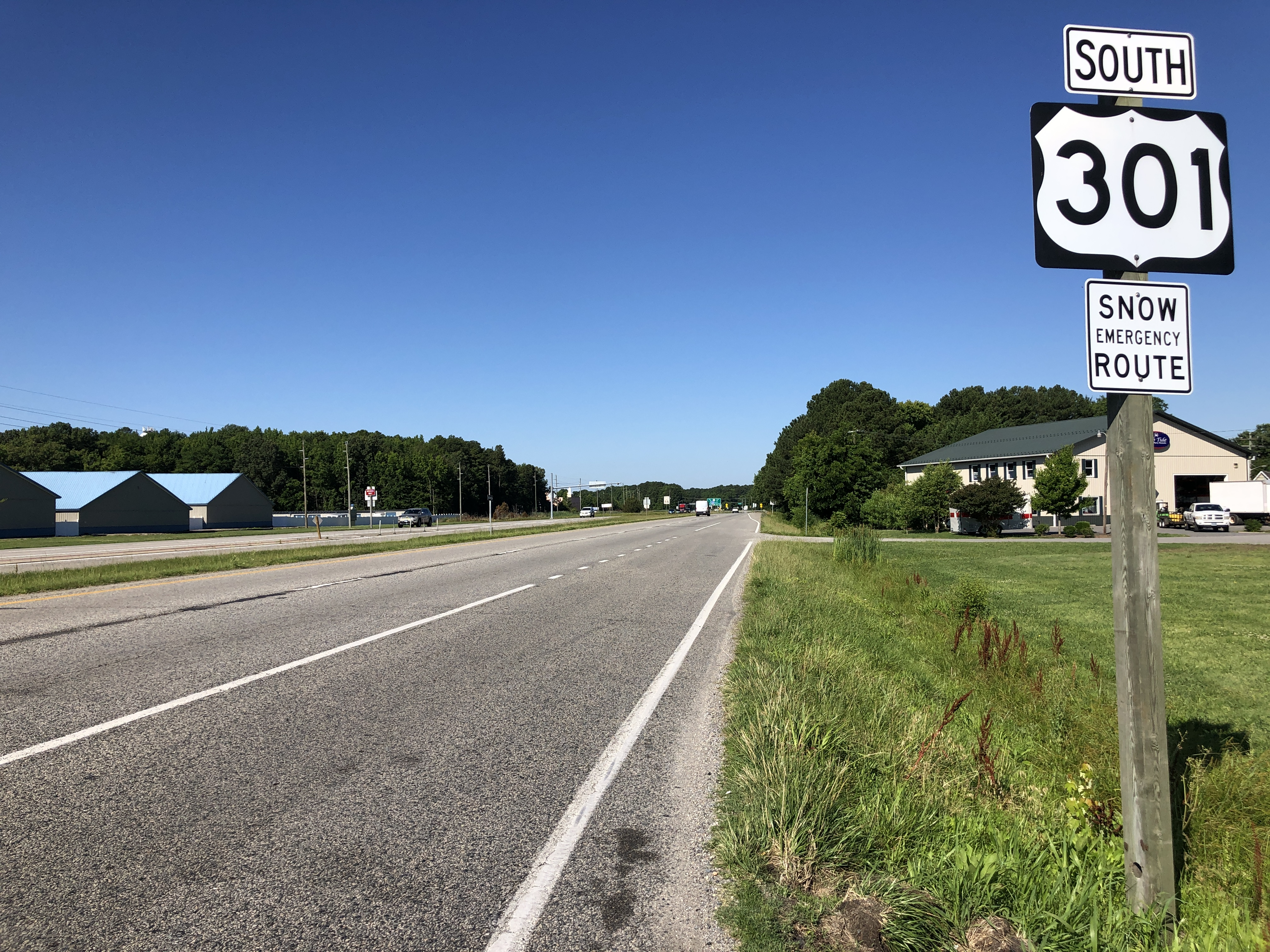
US 301 southbound in Queenstown

== Transportation ==
The primary present-day method of transportation to and from Queenstown is by road. The town is located adjacent to the junction of U.S. Route 301 (which towards Wilmington) and U.S. Route 50 (which towards Ocean City), which link the town to metropolitan Philadelphia, Washington, D.C., and Ocean City. State highways also serving the town include Maryland Route 18, Maryland Route 456 and Maryland Route 656.

== Demographics ==
Historical population
Census	Pop.	Note	%±
1900	374		—
1910	279		−25.4%
1920	270		−3.2%
1930	288		6.7%
1940	275		−4.5%
1950	316		14.9%
1960	395		25.0%
1970	387		−2.0%
1980	491		26.9%
1990	453		−7.7%
2000	617		36.2%
2010	664		7.6%
2020	705		6.2%
U.S. Decennial Census

=== 2010 census ===
As of the census of 2010, there were 664 people, 271 households, and 185 families living in the town. The population density was 457.9 inhabitants per square mile (176.8/km^{2}). There were 294 housing units at an average density of 202.8 per square mile (78.3/km^{2}). The racial makeup of the town was 92.9% White, 3.2% African American, 0.2% Native American, 0.9% Asian, 0.5% Pacific Islander, 0.9% from other races, and 1.5% from two or more races. Hispanic or Latino of any race were 3.8% of the population.

There were 271 households, of which 32.8% had children under the age of 18 living with them, 50.9% were married couples living together, 14.0% had a female householder with no husband present, 3.3% had a male householder with no wife present, and 31.7% were non-families. 26.6% of all households were made up of individuals, and 10.4% had someone living alone who was 65 years of age or older. The average household size was 2.45 and the average family size was 2.92.

The median age in the town was 40.2 years. 25% of residents were under the age of 18; 4.9% were between the ages of 18 and 24; 27.9% were from 25 to 44; 27% were from 45 to 64; and 15.2% were 65 years of age or older. The gender makeup of the town was 48.5% male and 51.5% female.

=== 2000 census ===
As of the census of 2000, there were 617 people, 255 households, and 184 families living in the town. The population density was 1,501.8 inhabitants per square mile (579.8/km^{2}). There were 279 housing units at an average density of 679.1 per square mile (262.2/km^{2}). The racial makeup of the town was 95.30% White, 3.73% African American, 0.16% Native American, 0.16% Asian, and 0.65% from two or more races. Hispanic or Latino of any race were 1.30% of the population.

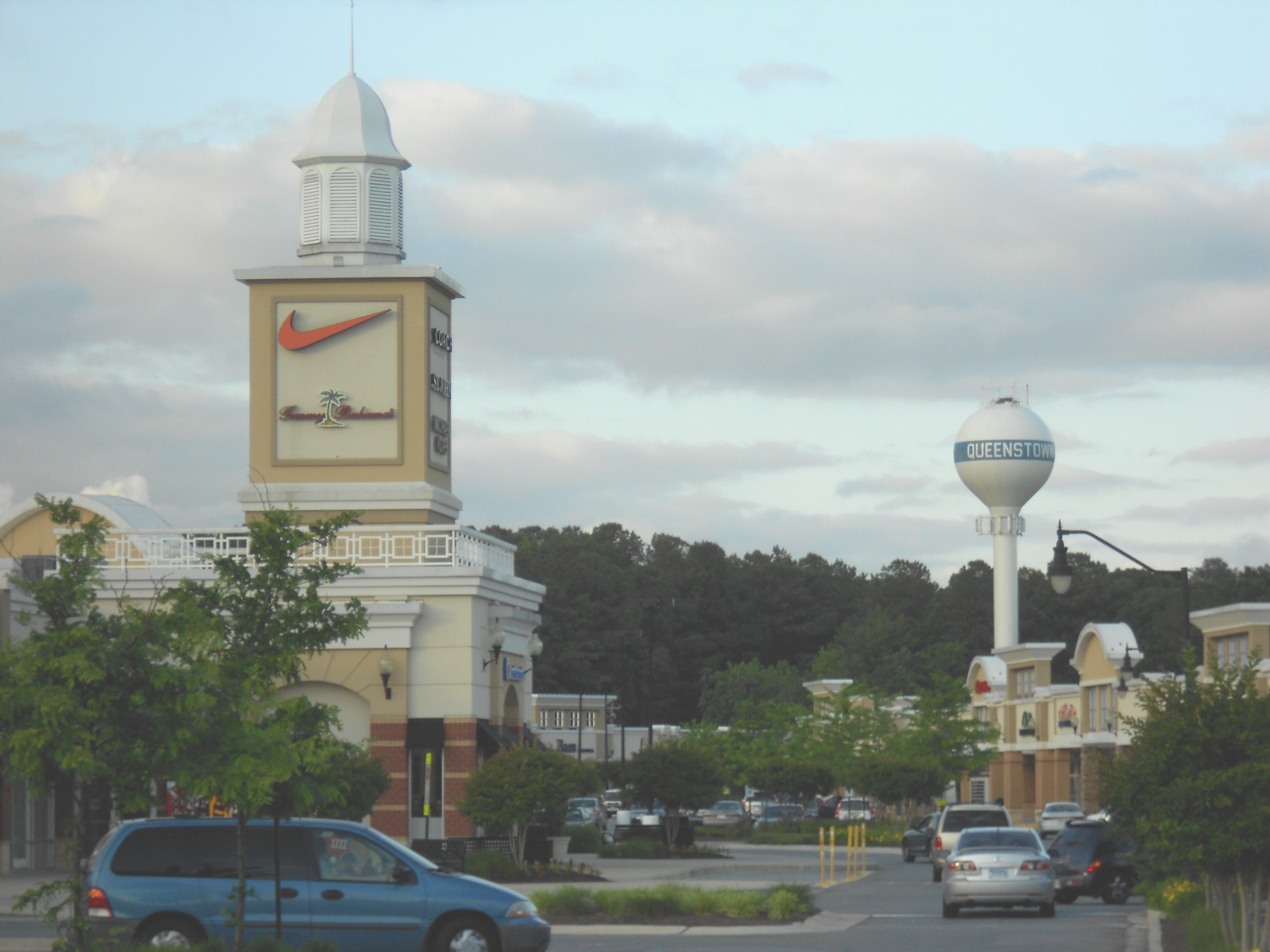
Outlet shopping center in Queenstown, Maryland

There were 255 households, out of which 27.1% had children under the age of 18 living with them, 57.6% were married couples living together, 11.0% had a female householder with no husband present, and 27.8% were non-families. 22.0% of all households were made up of individuals, and 6.3% had someone living alone who was 65 years of age or older. The average household size was 2.42 and the average family size was 2.83.

In the town, the population was spread out, with 20.6% under the age of 18, 8.6% from 18 to 24, 28.7% from 25 to 44, 28.4% from 45 to 64, and 13.8% who were 65 years of age or older. The median age was 41 years. For every 100 females, there were 102.3 males. For every 100 females age 18 and over, there were 99.2 males.

The median income for a household in the town was $48,500, and the median income for a family was $49,500. Males had a median income of $37,321 versus $30,893 for females. The per capita income for the town was $24,185. About 3.9% of families and 3.7% of the population were below the poverty line, including 2.8% of those under age 18 and 13.4% of those age 65 or over.

== Point of interest ==
Queenstown Premium Outlets is an open-air outlet mall located on Routes 50 and 301 that, at its peak, hosted over 65 stores. It is owned and operated by Simon Property Group through its Premium Outlets division. The mall opened in 1989 and was developed by Prime Retail.
