= Maryland Route 481 =

State highway in Maryland, United States

Maryland Route 481
- Damsontown Road
- Maryland Route 481 highlighted in red

Route information
- Maintained by MDSHA
- Length: 5.13 mi (8.26 km)
- Existed: 1933–present

Major junctions
- South end: MD 309 near Queen Anne
- North end: MD 304 in Ruthsburg

Location
- Country: United States
- State: Maryland
- Counties: Queen Anne's

Highway system
- Maryland highway system; Interstate; US; State; Scenic Byways
← MD 480	→ MD 482

Maryland Route 481 (MD 481) is a state highway in the U.S. state of Maryland. Known as Damsontown Road, the state highway runs 5.13 miles (8.26 km) from MD 309 near Queen Anne north to MD 304 in Ruthsburg. MD 481, which was constructed in the early 1930s, provides access to Tuckahoe State Park on its course through southeastern Queen Anne's County.

== Route description ==
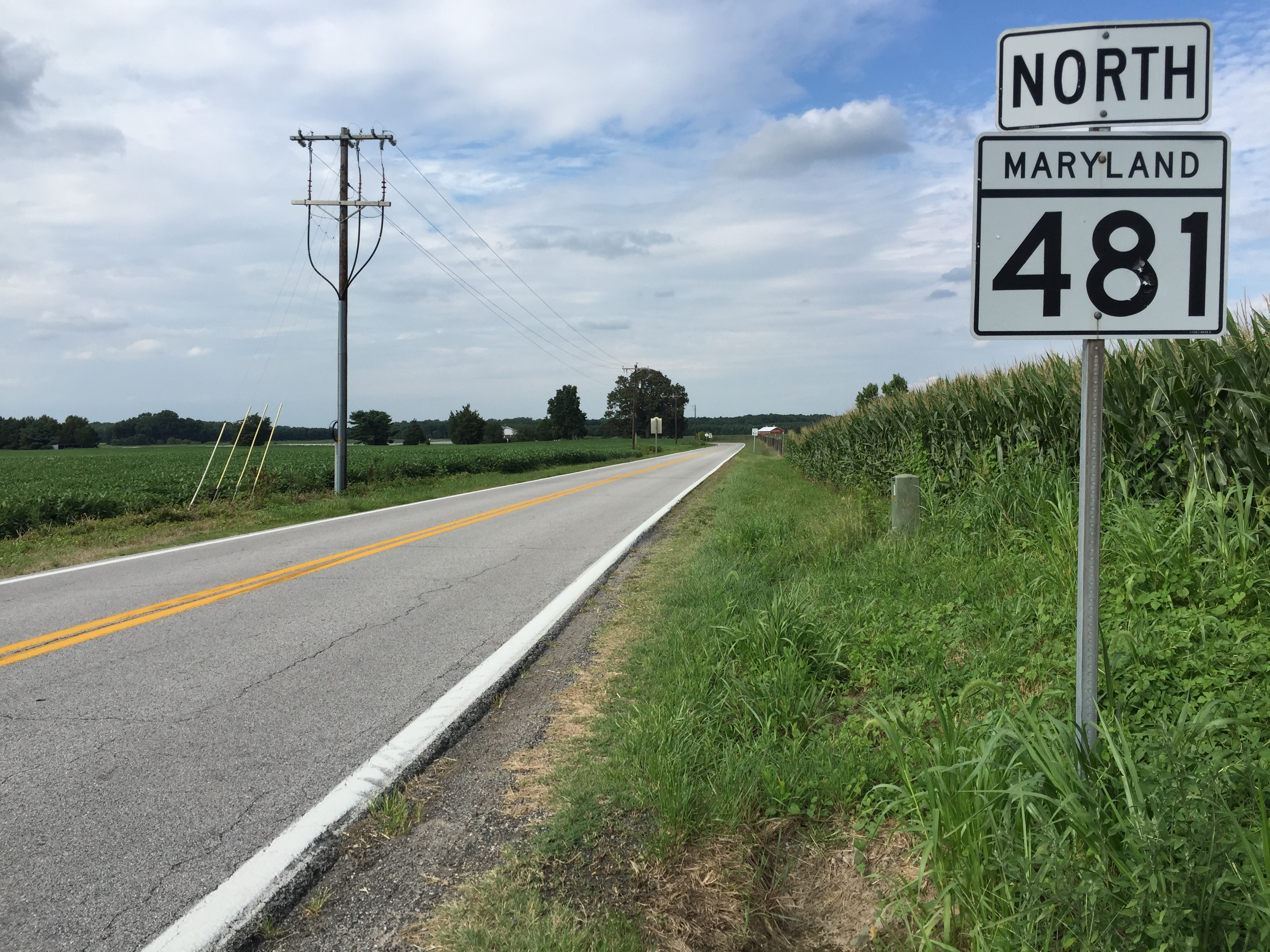
View north along MD 481 at MD 309 near Queen Anne

MD 481 begins at an intersection with MD 309 (Starr Road) north of Queen Anne. The two-lane undivided state highway heads north through farmland, passing Crouse Mill Road, which is used to access Tuckahoe State Park from the west. MD 481 curves east to cross Blockiston Branch, then veers north and meets the other end of Crouse Mill Road. The state highway reaches its northern terminus at MD 304 (Ruthsburg Road) in Ruthsburg.

== History ==
MD 481 was completed in 1933. The state highway has not changed beyond minor improvements.

== Junction list ==
The entire route is in Queen Anne's County.

Location	mi	km	Destinations	Notes
	0.00	0.00	MD 309 (Starr Road) – Denton, Centreville	Southern terminus
Ruthsburg	5.13	8.26	MD 304 (Ruthsburg Road) – Centreville, Bridgetown	Northern terminus
1.000 mi = 1.609 km; 1.000 km = 0.621 mi
