= Maryland Route 309 =

State highway in Maryland, United States

Maryland Route 309
- Maryland Route 309 highlighted in red

Route information
- Maintained by MDSHA
- Length: 18.50 mi (29.77 km)
- Existed: 1927–present

Major junctions
- South end: US 50 in Easton
- MD 303 in Cordova; MD 404 Alt. in Queen Anne; MD 303 in Queen Anne; MD 404 in Queen Anne; MD 481 near Queen Anne
- North end: MD 213 near Centreville

Location
- Country: United States
- State: Maryland
- Counties: Talbot, Queen Anne's

Highway system
- Maryland highway system; Interstate; US; State; Scenic Byways
← MD 308	→ MD 310

Maryland Route 309 (MD 309) is a state highway in the U.S. state of Maryland. The state highway runs 18.50 miles (29.77 km) from U.S. Route 50 (US 50) in Easton north to MD 213 south of Centreville. MD 309 is a C-shaped highway that passes through northeastern Talbot County and southeastern Queen Anne's County, connecting Easton and Centreville with Queen Anne, where the highway intersects MD 404. MD 309 was originally designated along the highway between Easton and Queen Anne. The highway was constructed south from Queen Anne to Cordova in the late 1920s along MD 303's current course and from Cordova to Easton in the early 1930s. In 1955, MD 309 gained its northern segment by assuming MD 303, which originally followed the Queen Anne–Centreville portion of the present MD 309. When MD 309 moved to a new alignment between Cordova and Queen Anne in the early 1960s, MD 303 was assigned to the old alignment.

== Route description ==
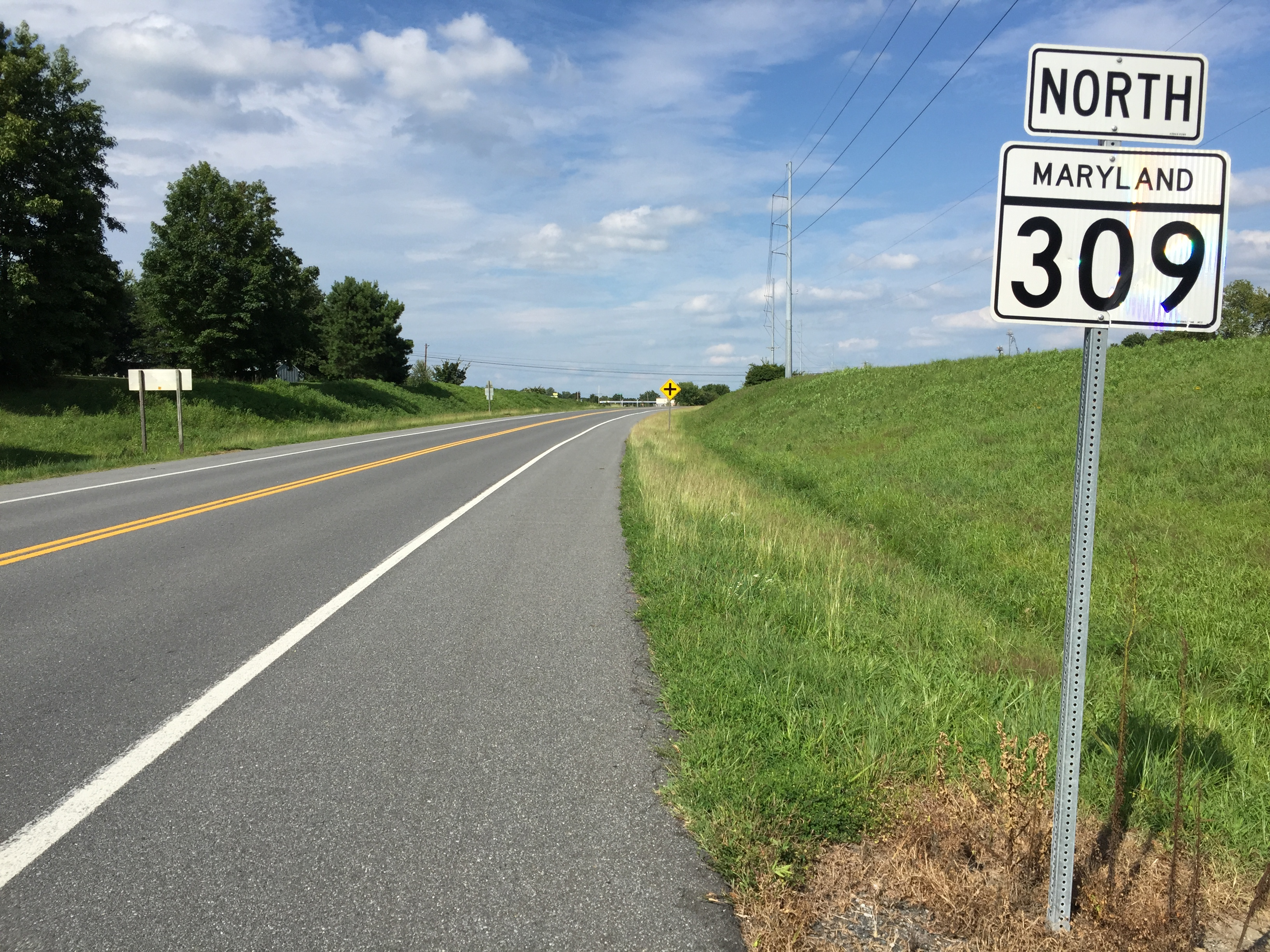
MD 309 northbound at MD 404 Alternate near Queen Anne

MD 309 begins at an intersection with US 50 (Ocean Gateway) opposite Airport Road to the east of Easton Airport in the town of Easton. The state highway heads east as two-lane undivided Black Dog Alley for a short distance before turning northeast onto Cordova Road and leaving the town of Easton. MD 309 heads north through a mix of farmland and forest parallel to an abandoned railroad grade owned by the Maryland Department of Transportation to the east of the road. After passing through the village of Cordova, the state highway reaches a junction with the southern terminus of MD 303 (Tappers Corner Road). MD 309 veers away from the railroad grade, crosses Norwich Creek, and intersects MD 404 Alternate west of the town of Queen Anne before entering Queen Anne's County at the junction with Park Avenue and Flowers Road. At the intersection with MD 303 (Main Street), MD 309 turns northwest onto Starr Road and crosses MD 404 (Queen Annes Highway) near some businesses. North of Queen Anne, the state highway traverses farmland, meets the southern end of MD 481 (Damsontown Road), and passes through the hamlet of Starr before reaching its northern terminus at MD 213 (Centreville Road) south of the town of Centreville.

== History ==
MD 309 originally consisted of the highway between Easton and Queen Anne. The highway from Queen Anne to south of Centreville was originally MD 303. A small piece of MD 309 was paved south of Queen Anne by 1921. Construction of the remainder of the highway to Cordova began in 1925 and was completed in 1929. The Cordova–Easton section was completed by 1933. In 1955, MD 309 assumed the length of MD 303 north to near Centreville. A present alignment of MD 309 opened between Cordova and Queen Anne in 1960; the old highway became the second edition of MD 303 in 1961. The southernmost portion of MD 309 was moved from Cordova Road to Black Dog Alley in 1995.

== Junction list ==
County	Location	mi	km	Destinations	Notes
Talbot	Easton	0.00	0.00	US 50 (Ocean Gateway) / Airport Road – Bay Bridge, Easton	Southern terminus
Talbot	Cordova	6.69	10.77	MD 303 north (Tappers Corner Road)	Southern terminus of MD 303; old alignment of MD 309
Talbot	Queen Anne	9.22	14.84	MD 404 Alt. east (Millsboro Denton Road) / Old Queen Anne Road west	Western terminus of MD 404 Alt.; old alignment of MD 404
Queen Anne's	Queen Anne	9.62	15.48	MD 303 (Main Street/Cordova Road) – Queen Anne	MD 309 turns northwest onto Starr Road
Queen Anne's	Queen Anne	9.74	15.68	MD 404 (Queen Annes Highway) – Bay Bridge, Denton	
Queen Anne's		11.80	18.99	MD 481 north (Damsontown Road) – Tuckahoe State Park	Southern terminus of MD 481
Queen Anne's		18.50	29.77	MD 213 (Centreville Road) – Wye Mills, Centreville	Northern terminus
1.000 mi = 1.609 km; 1.000 km = 0.621 mi

== Auxiliary routes ==
- MD 309A is the designation for Service Road A, a 0.12-mile (0.19 km) road that runs from MD 309 west to a dead end south of the MD 404 intersection in Queen Anne. The route was constructed in 2016.
- MD 309B is the designation for Entrance B, a short service road off of MD 303 between MD 309 and MD 404 in Queen Anne. The route was constructed in 2016.
