= Maryland Route 303 =

State highway in Maryland, United States

Maryland Route 303
- Maryland Route 303 highlighted in red

Route information
- Maintained by MDSHA
- Length: 4.20 mi (6.76 km)
- Existed: 1961–present

Major junctions
- South end: MD 309 in Cordova
- MD 404 Alt. in Queen Anne; MD 309 in Queen Anne
- North end: MD 404 in Queen Anne

Location
- Country: United States
- State: Maryland
- Counties: Talbot, Queen Anne's

Highway system
- Maryland highway system; Interstate; US; State; Scenic Byways
← MD 302	→ MD 304

Maryland Route 303 (MD 303) is a state highway in the U.S. state of Maryland. The state highway runs 4.20 miles (6.76 km) from MD 309 in Cordova north to MD 404 in Queen Anne. MD 303 is a reverse L-shaped highway that passes through the northeast corner of Talbot County and the southeast corner of Queen Anne's County. The state highway also passes very close to the birthplace of Frederick Douglass. MD 303 was originally designated along Starr Road between Queen Anne and U.S. Route 213 (US 213) south of Centreville, while present MD 303 is part of the old alignment of MD 309. The original MD 303 was constructed in the late 1920s and early 1930s, with a gap near Starr filled in the late 1940s. MD 309 absorbed MD 303 in 1955. MD 303 was assigned to its present course in 1961.

== Route description ==
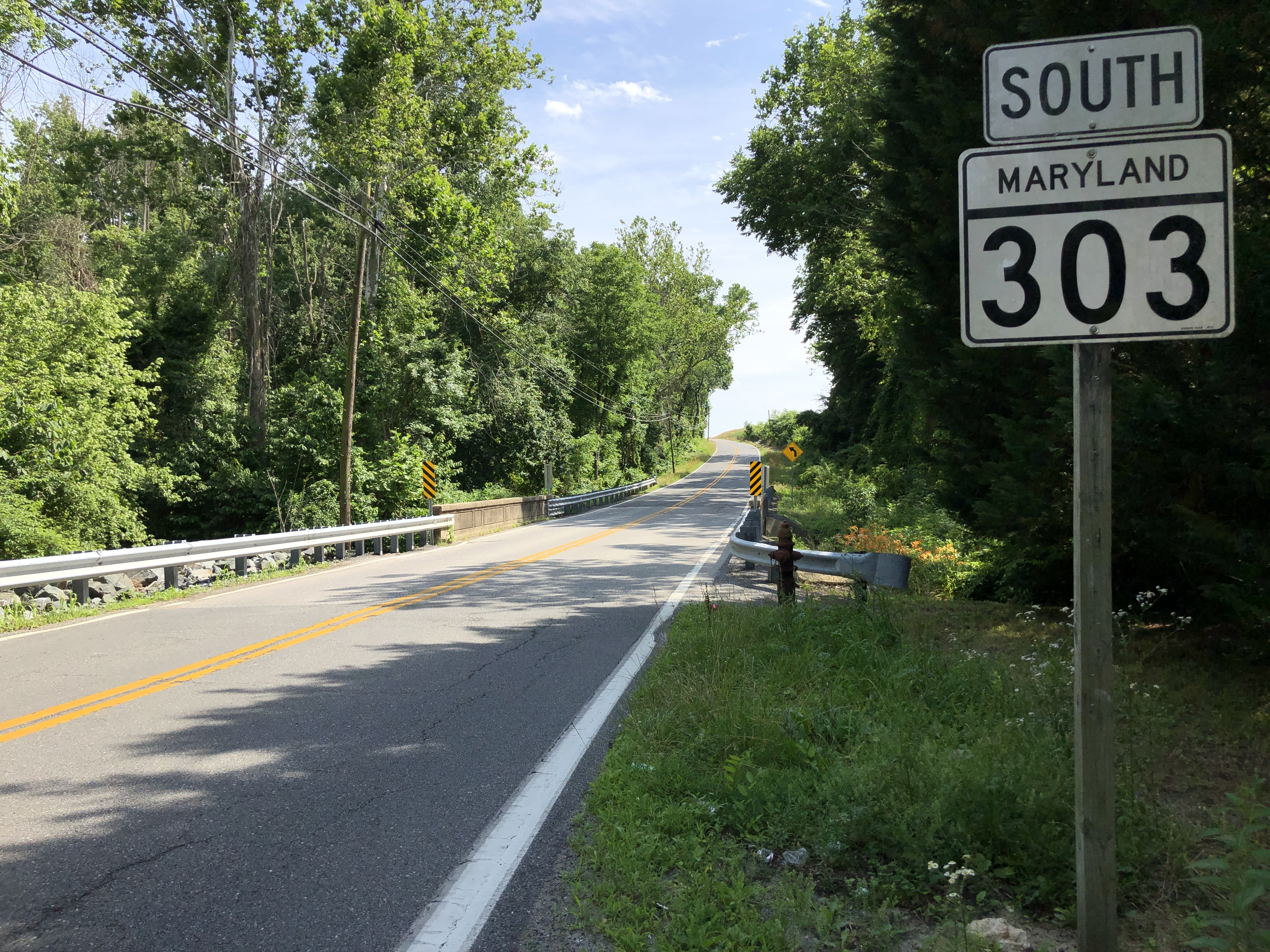
MD 303 southbound past MD 404 Alt. near Queen Anne

MD 303 begins at an intersection with MD 309 (Cordova Road) a short distance north of the village of Cordova in Talbot County. The state highway heads east as two-lane undivided Tappers Corner Road, passing under an abandoned railroad grade owned by the Maryland Department of Transportation and crossing a pair of branches of Tuckahoe Creek. MD 303 turns north onto Lewistown Road at Tappers Corner very close to the birthplace of Frederick Douglass. After crossing Norwich Creek, the state highway has a short concurrency with MD 404 Alternate (Talbot Avenue), during which MD 303 enters the town of Queen Anne. The state highway turns north onto Main Street to pass through the center of town and enters Queen Anne's County at the intersection with Park Avenue. MD 303 leaves the town after crossing the railroad grade and intersects MD 309, which heads southwest as Cordova Road and northwest as Starr Road. MD 303 turns northeast onto Cordova Road and comes to its northern terminus at a right-in/right-out intersection with the eastbound lanes of MD 404 (Queen Annes Highway). Traffic must use MD 309 for connections with the westbound lanes of MD 404.

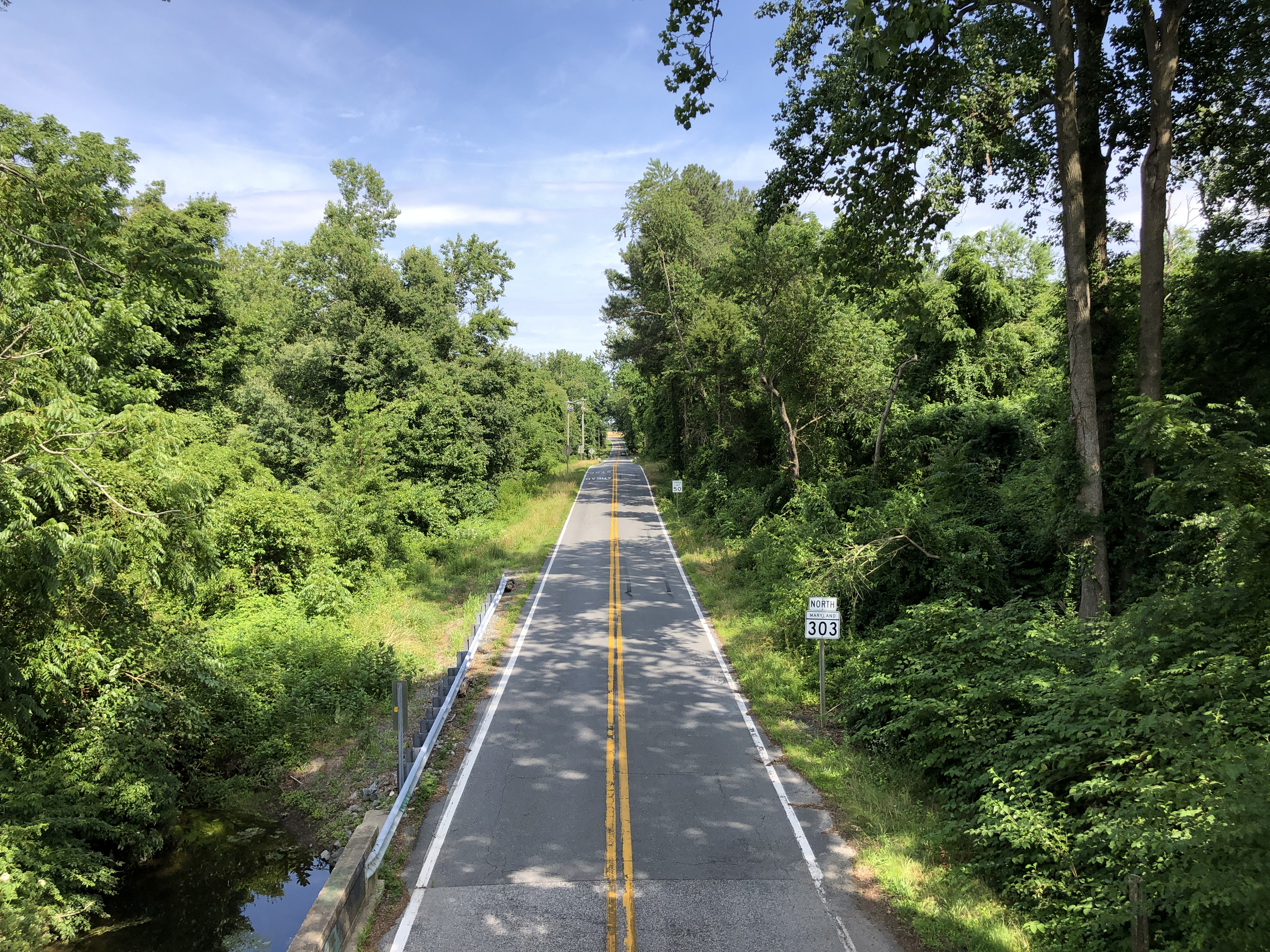
View north along MD 303 past MD 309 in Cordova

== History ==
The present MD 303 was originally part of MD 309. MD 303's first incarnation was between Queen Anne and US 213 (now MD 213) south of Centreville. Construction began in 1925 from Queen Anne. The highway was paved about 2 miles (3.2 km) north of Queen Anne by 1927. Another 1.5 miles (2.4 km) was paved toward Starr by 1930. By 1933, a second, unconnected section of MD 303 was constructed for 2 miles (3.2 km) east from US 213. The gap between the two sections was filled in two sections in 1949 and 1950. The first edition of MD 303 was assumed by MD 309 in 1955 when the latter highway was extended north from its terminus in Queen Anne to US 213. MD 303 was assigned to the old alignment of MD 309 between Cordova and Queen Anne in 1961 following the construction of MD 309's present alignment between Cordova and Queen Anne that parallels the railroad grade. The section of MD 303 between MD 309 and MD 404 in Queen Anne became one-way northbound in 2004; this section became a two-way road again in 2016.

== Junction list ==
County	Location	mi	km	Destinations	Notes
Talbot	Cordova	0.00	0.00	MD 309 (Cordova Road) – Easton	Southern terminus
Talbot	Queen Anne	3.58	5.76	MD 404 Alt. west (Talbot Avenue)	South end of concurrency with MD 404 Alternate
Talbot	Queen Anne	3.66	5.89	MD 404 Alt. east (Talbot Avenue) – Hillsboro	North end of concurrency with MD 404 Alternate
Queen Anne's	Queen Anne	4.03	6.49	MD 309 (Starr Road/Cordova Road) to MD 404 west – Centreville, Cordova	MD 309 forms southwest and northwest legs of intersection; MD 303 turns northeast onto Cordova Road
Queen Anne's	Queen Anne	4.20	6.76	MD 404 east (Queen Annes Highway) – Denton	Northern terminus; right-in/right-out intersection with eastbound MD 404
1.000 mi = 1.609 km; 1.000 km = 0.621 mi: Concurrency terminus; Incomplete access
