= Maryland Route 404 =

Highway in Maryland

Maryland Route 404

Route information
- Maintained by MDSHA
- Length: 24.61 mi (39.61 km)
- Existed: 1933–present
- Tourist routes: Harriet Tubman Underground Railroad Byway

Major junctions
- West end: MD 662 in Wye Mills
- US 50 in Wye Mills; MD 309 in Queen Anne; MD 303 in Queen Anne; MD 480 in Hillsboro; MD 312 near Ridgely; MD 328 in West Denton; MD 313 / MD 619 in Denton; MD 16 near Denton; MD 313 in Andersontown; MD 16 near Andersontown
- East end: DE 404 at Delaware border near Andersontown

Location
- Country: United States
- State: Maryland
- Counties: Talbot, Queen Anne's, Caroline

Highway system
- Maryland highway system; Interstate; US; State; Scenic Byways
← MD 402	→ MD 405

Maryland Route 404 (MD 404) is a major highway on Maryland's Eastern Shore in the United States. Signed east-west, it runs 24.61 miles (39.61 km) from MD 662 in Wye Mills on the border of Queen Anne's and Talbot counties, southeast to the Delaware state line in Caroline County, where the road continues as Delaware Route 404 (DE 404) to the Five Points intersection near Rehoboth Beach. The Maryland and Delaware state highways together cross the width of the Delmarva Peninsula and serve to connect the Baltimore–Washington Metropolitan Area by way of the Chesapeake Bay Bridge and U.S. Route 50 (US 50) with the Delaware Beaches. Along the way, MD 404 passes through mostly farmland and woodland as well as the towns of Queen Anne, Hillsboro, and Denton. The route is a four-lane divided highway between US 50 and east of Denton, with the remainder of the route a two-lane undivided road.

MD 404 was designated by 1933 to run from Matapeake (where the Annapolis–Matapeake ferry across the Chesapeake Bay connected the route to Annapolis), east along present-day MD 8, US 50, and MD 662 to Wye Mills, where it followed its current routing to the Delaware border. By 1946, the route's western terminus was moved to MD 2 north of Annapolis, where it headed east across the Chesapeake Bay on the Sandy Point-Matapeake ferry. The western terminus was cut back to Wye Mills in 1949, having been replaced by US 50 west of there. The route was realigned to bypass Queen Anne and Hillsboro in 1960 and Denton in 1987.

Since MD 404 is the main route for travelers between the Chesapeake Bay Bridge and the Delaware Beaches, the road experienced a high accident rate. To improve on this situation, the Maryland State Highway Administration planned to widen the two-lane portions of the route into a four-lane divided highway. A portion of the road east of Tuckahoe Creek in Caroline County received $7.7 million for widening as a part of the stimulus bill signed into law by President Barack Obama in 2009; this section was widened in 2012. Widening on the remainder of MD 404 between US 50 and Denton was completed in November 2017.

== Route description ==
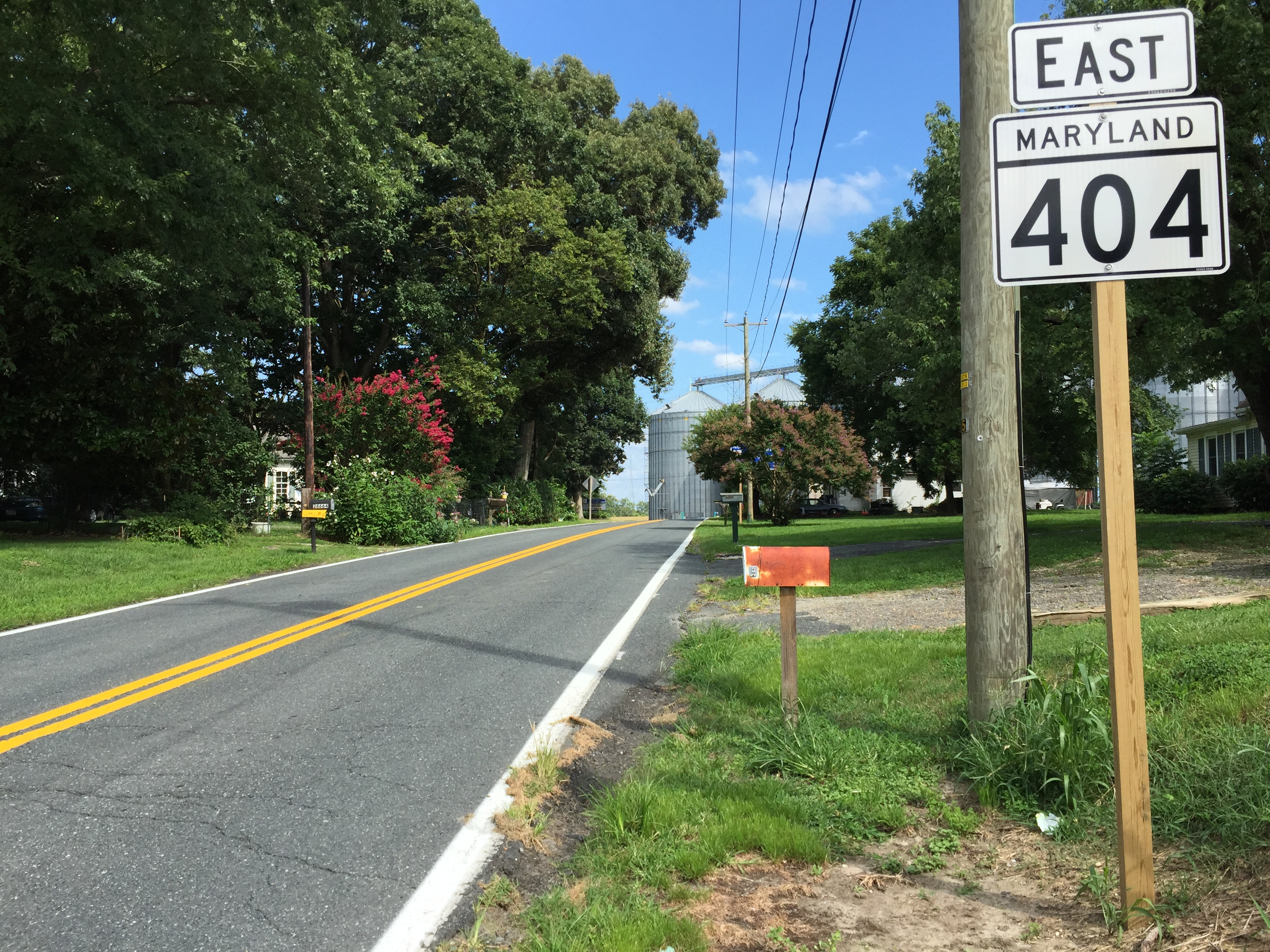
MD 404 eastbound past its western terminus at MD 662 in Wye Mills

MD 404 begins at an intersection with MD 662 (Old Wye Mills Road) in Wye Mills on the border between Queen Anne's County to the north and Talbot County to the south, heading to the east on Queen Anne's Highway, a two-lane undivided road. It runs east through farmland along the county line before reaching an intersection with US 50 (Ocean Gateway). This intersection has park and ride lots on the northwest and northeast corners. From here, MD 404 continues east through farmland with some residences and wooded areas as a four-lane divided highway, approaching the town of Queen Anne.

Further east, Old Queen Anne Road splits from MD 404 at an eastbound right-in/right-out intersection, with MD 404 crossing entirely into Queen Anne's County. It resumes east through some farmland before coming to a junction with MD 309 (Starr Road) near some businesses. Past MD 309, the route meets the northern terminus of MD 303 (Cordova Road), which intersects the route at a right-in/right-out intersection with the eastbound lanes of MD 404. From MD 303, the road enters wooded areas adjacent to Tuckahoe State Park, heading across an abandoned railroad grade owned by the Maryland Department of Transportation, before crossing the Tuckahoe Creek.

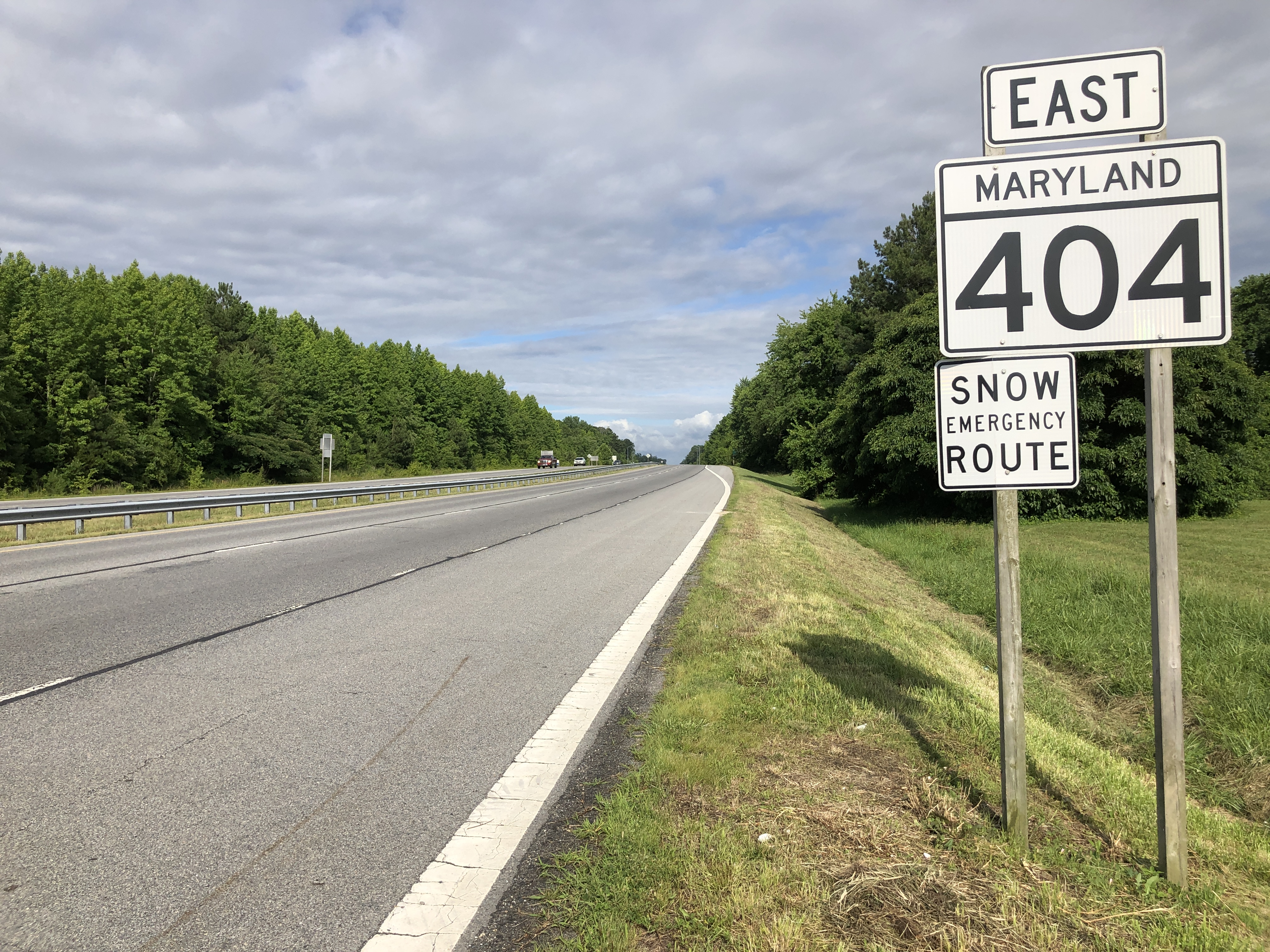
MD 404 eastbound past MD 480 near Hillsboro

MD 404 enters Caroline County upon crossing the Tuckahoe Creek, where it becomes Shore Highway. It emerges from the woods into agricultural areas, intersecting the western terminus of MD 480 (Ridgely Road) near Hillsboro. Past that intersection, the route heads through a mix of woods and residences before coming to a superstreet junction with the eastern terminus of MD 404 Alt. (Hillsboro Road), where MD 404 heads into a mix of farms and woodland. Unsigned MD 485 (Saathoff Road) loops to the south of MD 404 between a pair of superstreet junctions, returning to the route before the superstreet intersection with the southern terminus of MD 312 (Downes Station Road). The route continues to the southeast through farms, heading toward Denton. As the road approaches Denton, it heads through rural areas with some residences and businesses. MD 404 Bus. (Meeting House Road) splits from MD 404 to head through the center of Denton while MD 404 continues east to bypass Denton to the north.

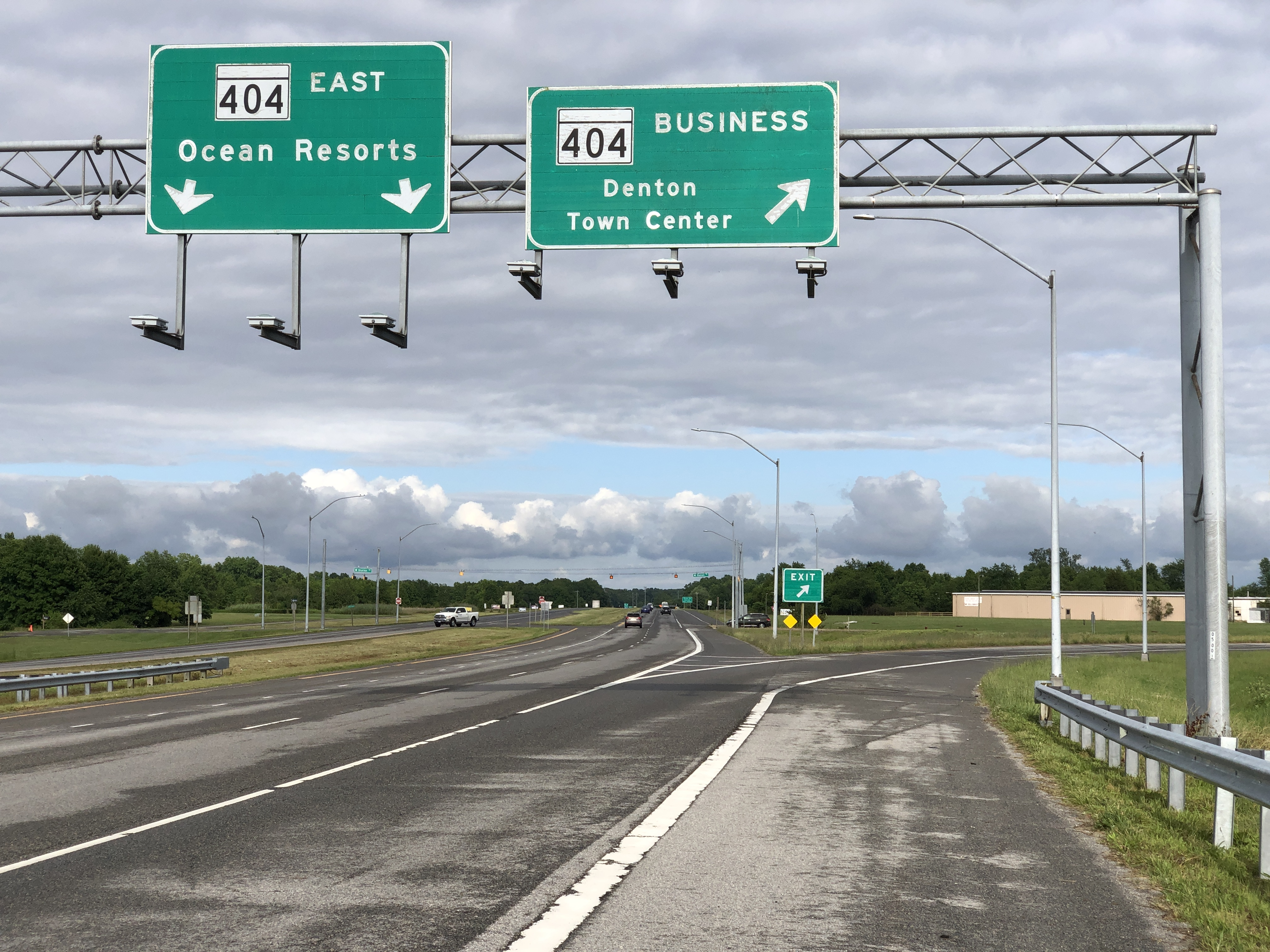
MD 404 eastbound at MD 404 Business near West Denton

The route runs through fields before intersecting MD 328 (New Bridge Road). Past this intersection, MD 404 crosses over the Choptank River on the Governor Harry R. Hughes Bridge. It continues east as a freeway with a diamond interchange at MD 313 (Greensboro Road) and MD 619 (Sixth Street), where some businesses are located. MD 313 forms a concurrency with MD 404 and the two routes turn south, heading along the eastern side of Denton through woodland and then past residential neighborhoods. The road turns to the southwest, heading into woods and intersecting the eastern terminus of MD 404 Bus. (Franklin Street/Gay Street) at an at-grade intersection, where the freeway section ends. MD 313/MD 404 continue as a four-lane divided highway with at-grade intersections that turns south and heads through some commercial areas.

The road heads south into farmland, passing east of Martinak State Park. It crosses over Watts Creek and comes to an intersection with MD 16 (Harmony Road), with that route joining MD 313/MD 404 for a three-way concurrency. The three routes continue southeast, narrowing into a two-lane undivided road that heads through a mix of woods and farms with some homes. The road turns more to the east-southeast, with MD 313 splitting from MD 16/MD 404 by heading south on Federalsburg Highway in Andersontown. The road turns southeast and in a short distance, MD 16 splits from MD 404 by heading east on Greenwood Road. Past this intersection, MD 404 continues southeast through farmland and woodland to the Delaware border, where the road continues as DE 404, which runs east to the Five Points intersection with DE 1 in Nassau (near Rehoboth Beach).

East of US 50, MD 404 serves as part of the main route connecting the Chesapeake Bay Bridge and the Baltimore–Washington Metropolitan Area to the Delaware Beaches. MD 404 is a part of the main National Highway System for its entire length except for the portion from MD 662 to US 50 in Wye Mills.

== History ==
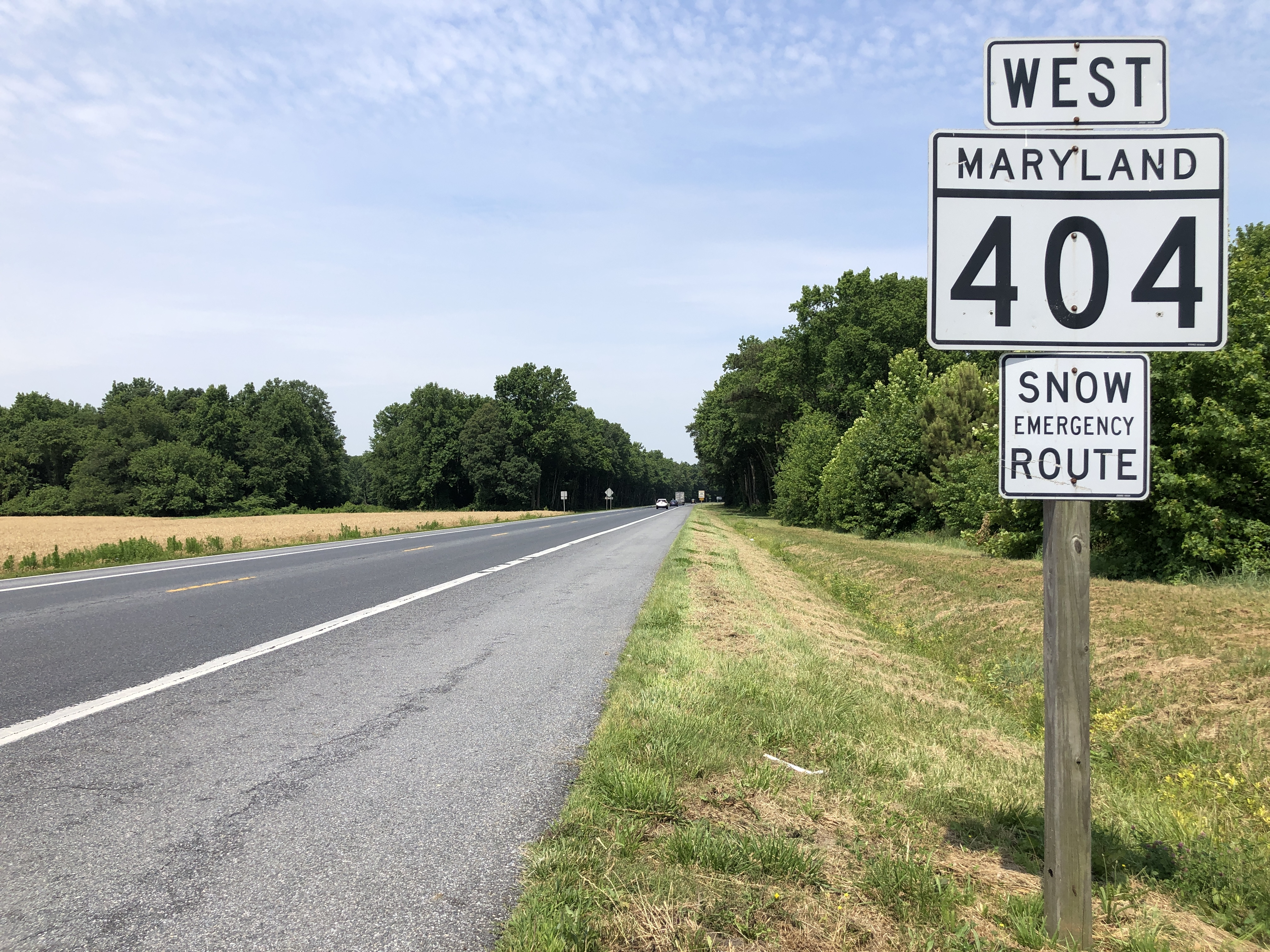
MD 404 westbound past the Delaware state line in Caroline County

By 1921, what would become MD 404 was built as a state highway within Queen Anne, from Hillsboro to a point between Hillsboro and Denton, and between West Denton and Denton. The state highway between Queen Anne and Denton was completed by 1927. By 1933, MD 404 was designated onto a state highway between Matapeake, where the Annapolis–Matapeake ferry across the Chesapeake Bay connected the route to Annapolis in Anne Arundel County, and the Delaware border southeast of Denton. The route headed east across Kent Island to Queenstown, where it turned southeast to Wye Mills and continued east through Queen Anne, Hillsboro, and Denton. By 1946, the route's western terminus was moved to MD 2 north of Annapolis in Anne Arundel County, crossing the Chesapeake Bay on the Sandy Point–Matapeake ferry, roughly where the Chesapeake Bay Bridge is now, and continuing west through Skidmore to MD 2. This extension of MD 404 replaced the portion of MD 179 leading to Skidmore. MD 404 was rerouted to bypass Wye Mills in 1948, with part of the former alignment through the community becoming part of MD 662.

A year later, the western terminus of MD 404 was moved to MD 662 in Wye Mills. West of Wye Mills, the route was replaced by an extended US 50. The former alignment of MD 404 west of Wye Mills is now the US 50 approaches to the Chesapeake Bay Bridge, with the part between Matapeake and Stevensville now a part of MD 8. In 1950, MD 404 was rerouted to bypass Queen Anne and Hillsboro to the north, with the former alignment now Old Queen Anne Road and MD 404 Alt. A portion of the route between Hillsboro and Denton was bypassed in 1960. This former alignment of MD 404 is now known as Saathoff Road and has the unsigned MD 485 designation. In 1972, MD 404 and MD 313 were relocated to a one-way pair, eastbound Franklin Street and westbound Gay Street, through Denton. The routes previously headed south out of Denton on Sixth Street and Fifth Avenue. The former alignment along Sixth Street became MD 619 by 1978. In the early 1980s, construction began to widen MD 404 to a divided highway. By 1985, construction was underway for the four-lane divided bypass of Denton between MD 404 west of Denton and MD 313 north of Denton. In 1987, MD 313 and MD 404 were rerouted to bypass Denton along the newly completed four-lane divided bypass. The former alignment of MD 404 through Denton became MD 404 Bus.

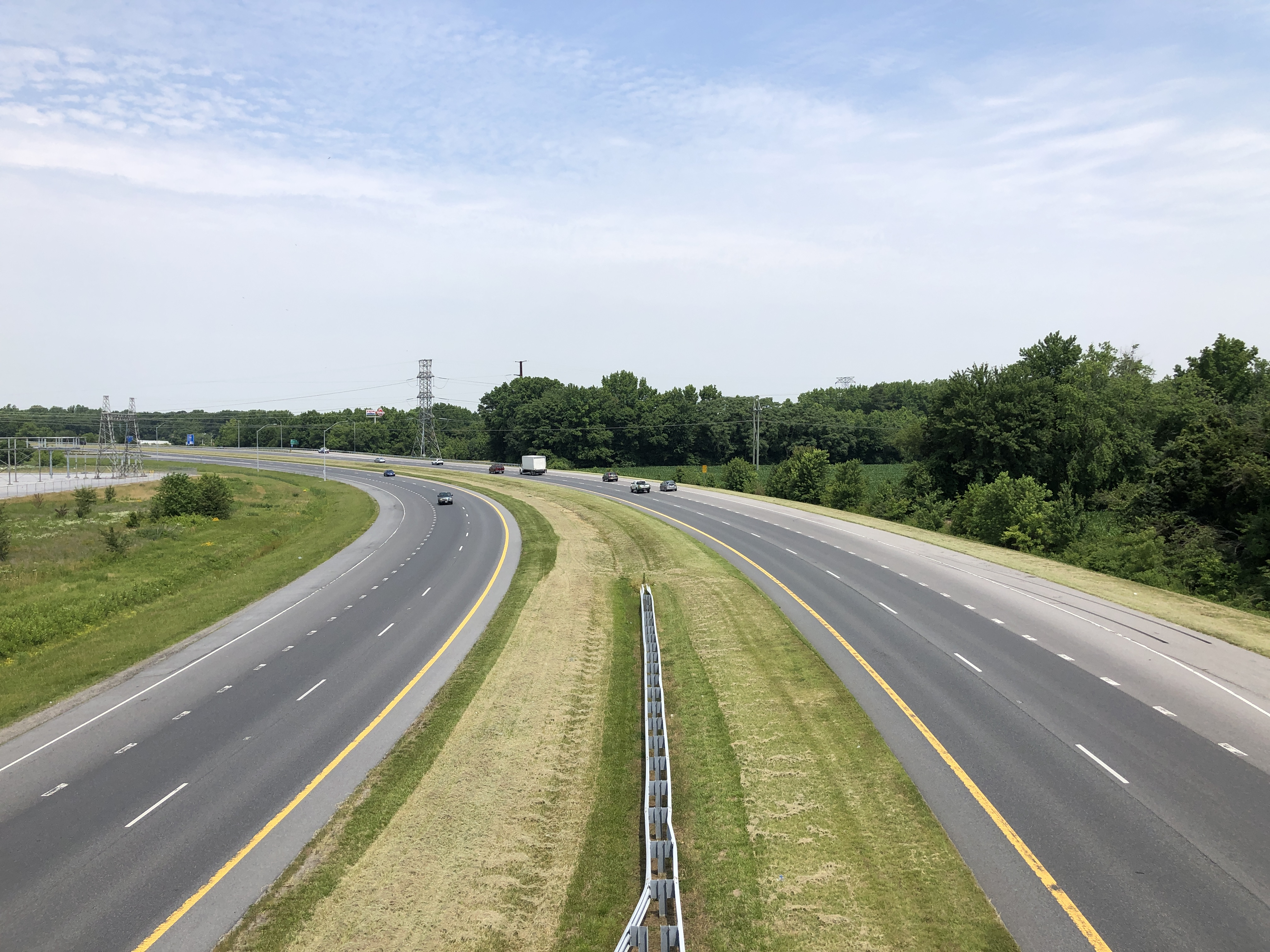
MD 404 westbound concurrent with MD 313 northbound on the bypass of Denton

The Maryland State Highway Administration worked on improvements to MD 404 in order to provide relief to travelers driving to the ocean resorts, notably by widening the remainder of the route into a four-lane divided highway. The primary motive behind the widening was the high accident rate that plagued the two-lane road, brought on by beach traffic. The divided highway portion of MD 404 in the Denton area was extended further in the 2000s from the south end of Denton to the Sennett Road intersection east of where MD 16 joins the route. The section between south of Legion Road and Double Hills Road was widened in 2005 while the section between Double Hills Road and Sennett Road was widened in 2007. This project received $3 million from the federal government in 2001. As part of the American Recovery and Reinvestment Act of 2009 signed into law by President Barack Obama on February 17, 2009, $7.7 million went to widening a portion of MD 404 east of Tuckahoe Creek in Caroline County, creating 221 jobs. The widening of this section was completed in 2012. On May 21, 2014, groundbreaking took place to widen MD 404 between west of MD 309 and Cemetery Road. The project to widen this section cost a total of $39 million. On June 25, 2015, Governor Larry Hogan announced that state funding would be allocated to finish widening MD 404 between US 50 and Denton, among other projects across the state. A total of $160 million in funds would go to widening MD 404. Widening of the section between west of MD 309 and Cemetery Road was completed in mid-2017. Work on widening of the remaining sections of MD 404 between US 50 and Denton was completed on November 20, 2017, with Governor Hogan in attendance for a ribbon-cutting ceremony.

On May 29, 2011, the Route 404 Memorial Garden, located near Denton, was dedicated, honoring those who were killed in car accidents along MD 404. The memorial consists of a flagpole surrounded by a circular path with bricks bearing the names of people who died along the route.

== Junction list ==
County	Location	mi	km	Destinations	Notes
Queen Anne's–Talbot county line	Wye Mills	0.00	0.00	MD 662 (Old Wye Mills Road) – Wye Oak State Park, Chesapeake College	Western terminus of MD 404
Queen Anne's–Talbot county line	Wye Mills	1.01	1.63	US 50 (Ocean Gateway) – Bay Bridge, Easton	
Queen Anne's	Queen Anne	6.75	10.86	MD 309 (Starr Road) to MD 303 – Centreville, Queen Anne	
Queen Anne's	Queen Anne	6.96	11.20	MD 303 south (Cordova Road)	Northern terminus of MD 303; right-in/right-out intersection with eastbound MD 404
Caroline	Hillsboro	7.97	12.83	MD 480 east (Ridgely Road) – Ridgely	Western terminus of MD 480
Caroline		9.14	14.71	MD 404 Alt. west (Hillsboro Road) – Hillsboro	Superstreet intersection; eastern terminus of MD 404 Alt.; former MD 404
Caroline		9.43	15.18	MD 485 east (Saathoff Road)	Superstreet intersection; western terminus of MD 485; former MD 404
Caroline		9.97	16.05	MD 485 west (Saathoff Road)	Superstreet intersection; eastern terminus of MD 485; former MD 404
Caroline		10.25	16.50	MD 312 north (Downes Station Road) – Ridgely	Superstreet intersection; southern terminus of MD 312
Caroline	West Denton	12.84	20.66	MD 404 Bus. east (Meeting House Road) – Denton Town Center	Western terminus of MD 404 Bus.; former MD 404
Caroline	West Denton	13.68	22.02	MD 328 (New Bridge Road) – Easton	
Caroline	West Denton	13.68	22.02	West end of freeway section	
Caroline	Denton	14.67	23.61	MD 313 north (Greensboro Road) / MD 619 south (North Sixth Street) – Denton, Greensboro	Diamond interchange; west end of MD 313 overlap; northern terminus of MD 619
Caroline	Denton	15.07	24.25	East end of freeway section	
Caroline	Denton	16.07	25.86	MD 404 Bus. west (Gay Street/Franklin Street) – Denton	Eastern terminus of MD 404 Bus.; former MD 404
Caroline	Denton	18.26	29.39	MD 16 west (Harmony Road) to US 50 east – Harmony, Preston, American Corner	West end of MD 16 overlap
Caroline	Andersontown	20.54	33.06	MD 313 south (Federalsburg Highway) – Federalsburg, American Corner	East end of MD 313 overlap
Caroline		21.43	34.49	MD 16 east (Greenwood Road) – Greenwood	East end of MD 16 overlap
Caroline		24.61	39.61	DE 404 east (Seashore Highway) – Bridgeville	Delaware state line; eastern terminus of MD 404
1.000 mi = 1.609 km; 1.000 km = 0.621 mi: Concurrency terminus; Incomplete access

== Related routes ==
=== Hillsboro alternate route ===
Maryland Route 404 Alternate
- Location: Queen Anne–Hillsboro
- Length: 2.69 mi (4.33 km)
- Tourist routes: Harriet Tubman Underground Railroad Byway

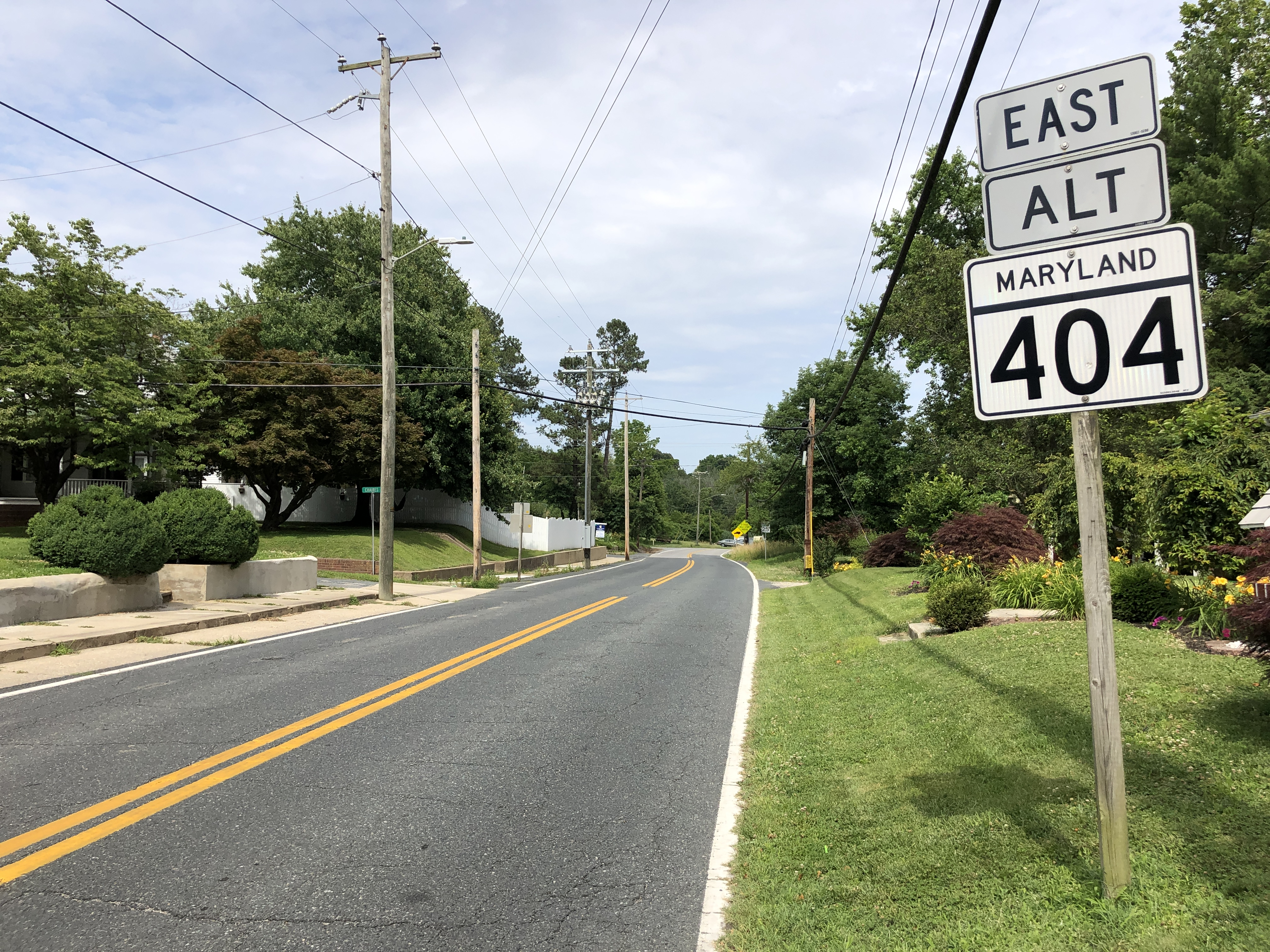
MD 404 Alt. eastbound at MD 303 in Queen Anne

Maryland Route 404 Alternate (MD 404 Alt.) is a 2.69-mile (4.33 km) long alternate route of MD 404 in Talbot and Caroline counties. The route runs along the former alignment of MD 404 through the towns of Queen Anne and Hillsboro. The route begins at an intersection with MD 309 (Cordova Road) near Queen Anne, Talbot County, where it heads east on two-lane undivided Millsboro Denton Road. West of MD 309, Old Queen Anne Road continues west to MD 404. MD 404 Alt. passes through woodland, crossing under an abandoned railroad grade owned by the Maryland Department of Transportation before coming to MD 303 (Lewistown Road). At this point, the route turns north to form a concurrency with MD 303 along Talbot Avenue, and the two routes enter Queen Anne as it turns to the east. MD 303 splits from MD 404 Alt. by turning north on Main Street, while MD 404 Alt. continues east past homes, intersecting MD 518 (First Street). As the road runs a short distance to the south of the Tuckahoe Creek, there is an industrial building on the south side of the road. Upon crossing the Tuckahoe Creek, MD 404 Alt. enters Hillsboro in Caroline County and becomes Hillsboro Road. The route continues through residential areas of the town. Upon leaving Hillsboro, the road heads into agricultural areas with a few homes and a patch of woods. MD 404 Alt. ends at an intersection with MD 404 east of Hillsboro.

Junction list

County	Location	mi	km	Destinations	Notes
Talbot	Queen Anne	0.00	0.00	MD 309 (Cordova Road)	Western terminus of MD 404 Alt.
Talbot	Queen Anne	0.48	0.77	MD 303 south (Lewistown Road)	West end of MD 303 overlap
Talbot	Queen Anne	0.56	0.90	MD 303 north (Main Street)	East end of MD 303 overlap
Talbot	Queen Anne	0.64	1.03	MD 518 north (First Street)	Southern terminus of MD 518
Caroline		2.69	4.33	MD 404 (Shore Highway)	Eastern terminus of MD 404 Alt.
1.000 mi = 1.609 km; 1.000 km = 0.621 mi: Concurrency terminus

=== Denton business loop ===
Maryland Route 404 Business
- Location: Denton
- Length: 2.32 mi (3.73 km)
- Tourist routes: Harriet Tubman Underground Railroad Byway

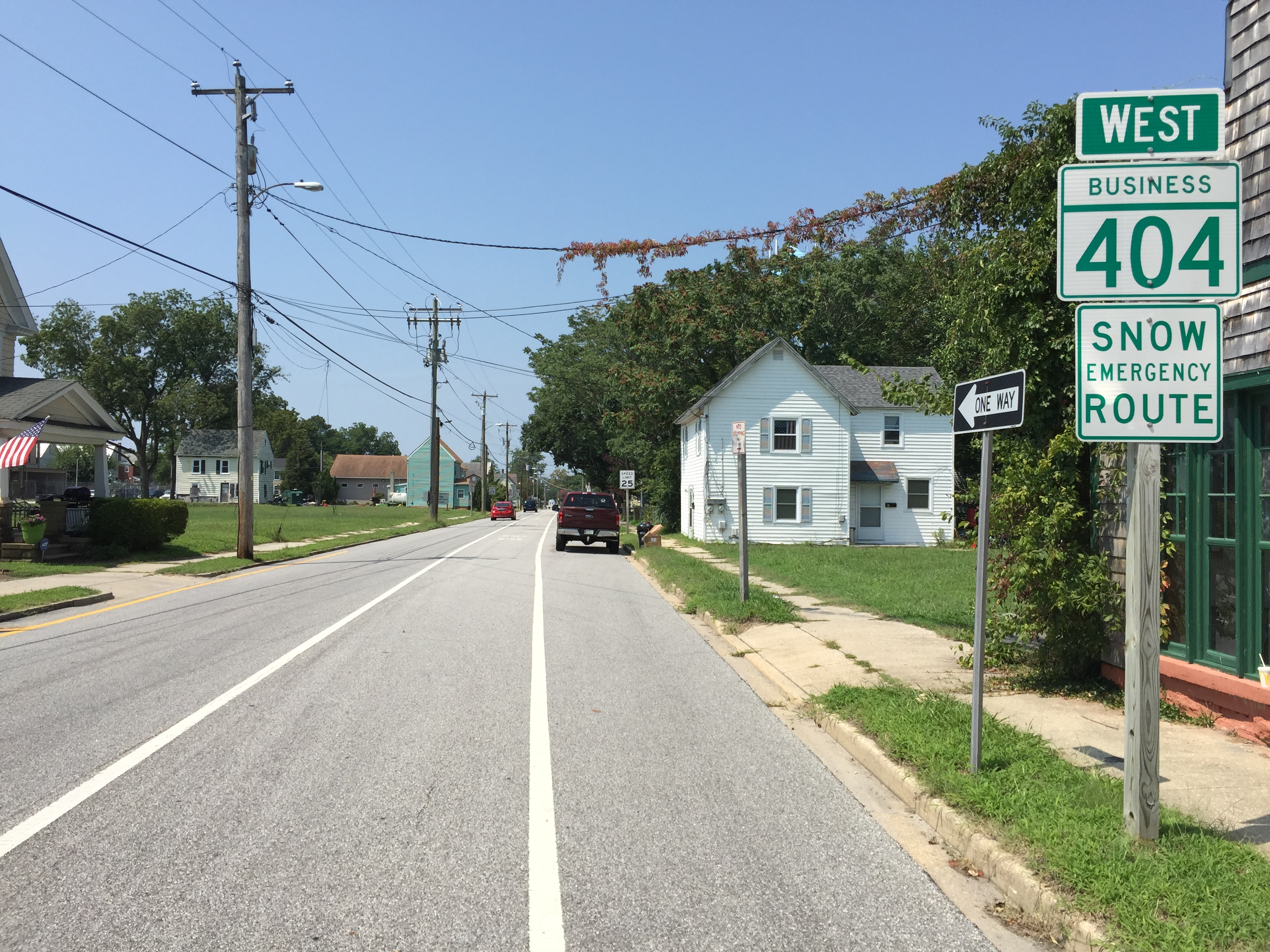
View west along MD 404 Bus. at MD 619 in downtown Denton

Maryland Route 404 Business (MD 404 Bus.) is a 2.32-mile (3.73 km) long business route of MD 404 through the town of Denton in Caroline County. The route runs along the former alignment of MD 404 that was bypassed by the divided, four-lane Denton Bypass. MD 404 Bus. branches off from MD 404 west of Denton by heading southeast on a two-lane divided road called Meeting House Road that soon becomes undivided as it passes through farmland with some businesses. As it comes to MD 328 (New Bridge Road) in West Denton, the route passes near residences. The road crosses the Choptank River into Denton, where it becomes Franklin Street. Shortly after the river, MD 404 Bus. splits into a one-way pair that follows Franklin Street eastbound and Gay Street westbound, with Market Street running between Franklin and Gay streets. The one-way pair, which has two lanes in each direction, carries the route through the residential and commercial downtown of Denton, with the westbound direction passing north of the Caroline County Courthouse. East of the downtown area, the one-way pair intersects MD 619 (Sixth Street). In the eastern part of Denton, the two directions of MD 404 Bus. turn south and join again, becoming a four-lane divided highway with the Franklin Street name that runs through woodland. MD 404 Bus. ends at MD 313/MD 404 a short distance later.

Junction list
The entire route is in Caroline County.

Location	mi	km	Destinations	Notes
West Denton	0.00	0.00	MD 404 (Shore Highway) to MD 313 – Bay Bridge	Western terminus of MD 404 Bus.
West Denton	0.76	1.22	MD 328 (New Bridge Road) – Easton	
Denton	1.72	2.77	MD 619 (Sixth Street) to MD 317	
Denton	2.32	3.73	MD 313 / MD 404 (Shore Highway)	Eastern terminus of MD 404 Bus.
1.000 mi = 1.609 km; 1.000 km = 0.621 mi

=== Auxiliary routes ===
- MD 404C runs along Liden School Road from MD 404 northeast to MD 404D southeast of Denton in Caroline County. The route is 0.03 mi (0.048 km) long.
- MD 404D runs along Patten Road and Liden School Road from the beginning of state maintenance southeast to the end of state maintenance southeast of Denton in Caroline County, intersecting MD 404C. The route is 0.22 mi (0.35 km) long.
- MD 404F was the designation for an unnamed road running from a dead end near the Choptank River east to Market Street in Denton, Caroline County, crossing the westbound direction of MD 404 Bus. along the way. The route was 0.08 mi (0.13 km) long. In 2003, the route was removed from the state highway system and transferred to town maintenance.
- MD 404K runs along West Frontage Road from MD 404P north to MD 404N in Denton, Caroline County, running to the west of MD 313/MD 404. The route is 0.31 mi (0.50 km) long. The road was constructed in 2004.
- MD 404L runs along West Frontage #2 from a cul-de-sac north to MD 404P in Denton, Caroline County, running to the west of MD 313/MD 404. The route is 0.39 mi (0.63 km) long. The road was constructed in 2004.
- MD 404M runs along East Frontage Road from MD 404R north to MD 313/MD 404 in Denton, Caroline County, running to the east of MD 313/MD 404. The route is 0.36 mi (0.58 km) long. The road was constructed in 2004.
- MD 404N runs along Sharp Road from the beginning of state maintenance east to MD 313/MD 404 in Denton, Caroline County, intersecting MD 404K. The route is 0.05 mi (0.080 km) long. The road was transferred from county to state maintenance and reconstructed in 2004.
- MD 404P runs along Deep Shore Road from the beginning of state maintenance at MD 404L east to MD 313/MD 404 and MD 404R in Denton, Caroline County, intersecting MD 404K. The route is 0.07 mi (0.11 km) long. The road was transferred from county to state maintenance and reconstructed in 2004.
- MD 404R runs along Double Hills Road from the beginning of state maintenance north to MD 313/MD 404 and MD 404P in Denton, Caroline County, intersecting MD 404M. The route is 0.24 mi (0.39 km) long. The road was transferred from county to state maintenance and reconstructed in 2004.
- MD 404S runs along West Frontage Road from MD 16 east to MD 16/MD 313/MD 404 at Sennett Road southeast of Denton in Caroline County. The route is 0.28 mi (0.45 km) long. MD 404S was designated in 2007 to a 0.085-mile (0.137 km) road running from MD 16/MD 313/MD 404 west to a dead end. In 2016, the route was extended from the dead end west to MD 16.
- MD 404T runs along Service Road 9A from MD 404 north to MD 404U near Hillsboro, Caroline County. The route is 0.09 mi (0.14 km) long. The road was constructed in 2011.
- MD 404U runs along Service Road 9B from MD 404T east to a cul-de-sac near Hillsboro, Caroline County. The route is 0.085 mi (0.137 km) long. The road was constructed in 2011.
