= WKDI =

- Denton, Maryland; United States
- Frequency: 840 kHz

Programming
- Format: southern gospel

Ownership
- Owner: Positive Alternative Radio, Inc.

Technical information
- Licensing authority: FCC
- Facility ID: 4131
- Class: D
- Power: 1,000 watts day
- Transmitter coordinates: 38°53′53.00″N 75°51′10.00″W

Links
- Public license information: Public file; LMS
- Webcast: Listen Live
- Website: joyfm.org

WKDI (840 AM, 100.5 FM) is a radio station broadcasting a southern gospel format. Licensed to Denton, Maryland, United States, the station is currently owned by Positive Alternative Radio, Inc.

The station, and its FM translator, flipped from brokered religious/contemporary Christian music programming to its current southern gospel format in June 2019.
