= Hugh Hazlett =

Irish–American abolitionist

- Born: c. 1831
- Died: post-1880
- Occupations: Lawyer, laborer
- Known for: Abolitionist activities in Maryland

Hugh Hazlett was an Irish American lawyer and abolitionist. Born in Ireland, Hazlett immigrated to the United States, eventually settling in Maryland. He became a conductor on the Underground Railroad in Maryland's eastern shore, and was jailed for his activities between 1858 and 1864.

== Biography ==
Hazlett was born in Ireland sometime around 1831. He immigrated to the United States, eventually coming to reside in Dorchester County, Maryland. Some sources record him as being a lawyer, others as a laborer. At some point in the 1850s, Hazlett became involved in the Underground Railroad, helping enslaved persons flee Maryland for the northern United States and Canada.

In July 1858, Hazlett attempted to escort a group of seven slaves (Note: John Green, Mary Light and Charles Anthony Light, Esther Cornish, Solomon Cornish, William Henry Cornish, and Thomas Ridout) through Caroline County, Maryland. However, the region's slave owners were on high alert for escape attempts, and so passage was difficult. The group needed to cross the swampy Choptank River on their way north, and so planned for a crossing near Denton, Maryland. After several days of travel, however, the group was betrayed by Jesse Perry, an African American man who turned the group over to a mob of white men. Having been recaptured, the group was put aboard a steamboat at Denton; the posse that had captured them was rewarded with $1000 divided between them. In Cambridge, Hazlett was met with an angry crowd, and he was imprisoned in a county jail. He managed to escape in October, but was recaptured and put on trial.

Hazlett's trial began in November 1858. In the staunchly pro-slavery Caroline County court, he was convicted on seven indictments for enticing, persuading, assisting, and harboring slaves. He was sentenced to six years for each indictment, totaling a maximum sentence of forty-four years in prison. Hazlett would ultimately serve six years of this sentence as in 1864, with the end of the American Civil War drawing closer, the state of Maryland voted to nullify the crime of helping a slave to escape. Hazlett was officially pardoned by Governor Augustus Bradford in November 1864 for good conduct while in prison. Hazlett remained in Maryland after his release, and was last recorded working as an iron worker in Timonium, Maryland in 1880.

== Legacy ==
Historical markers noting the place and circumstance of Hazlett's arrest were erected in Cambridge and Denton.
