= Queen Anne, Maryland =

- Town
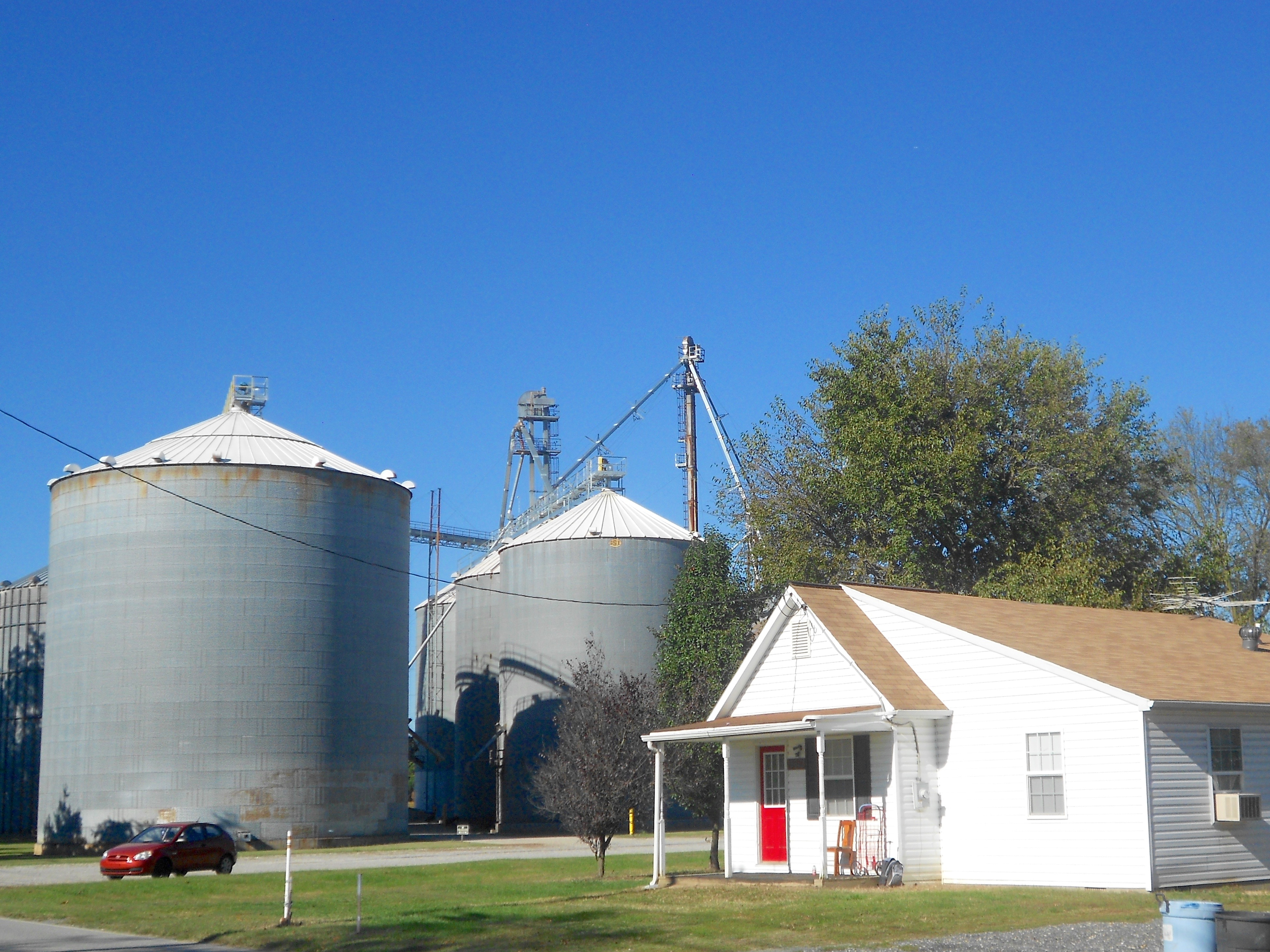
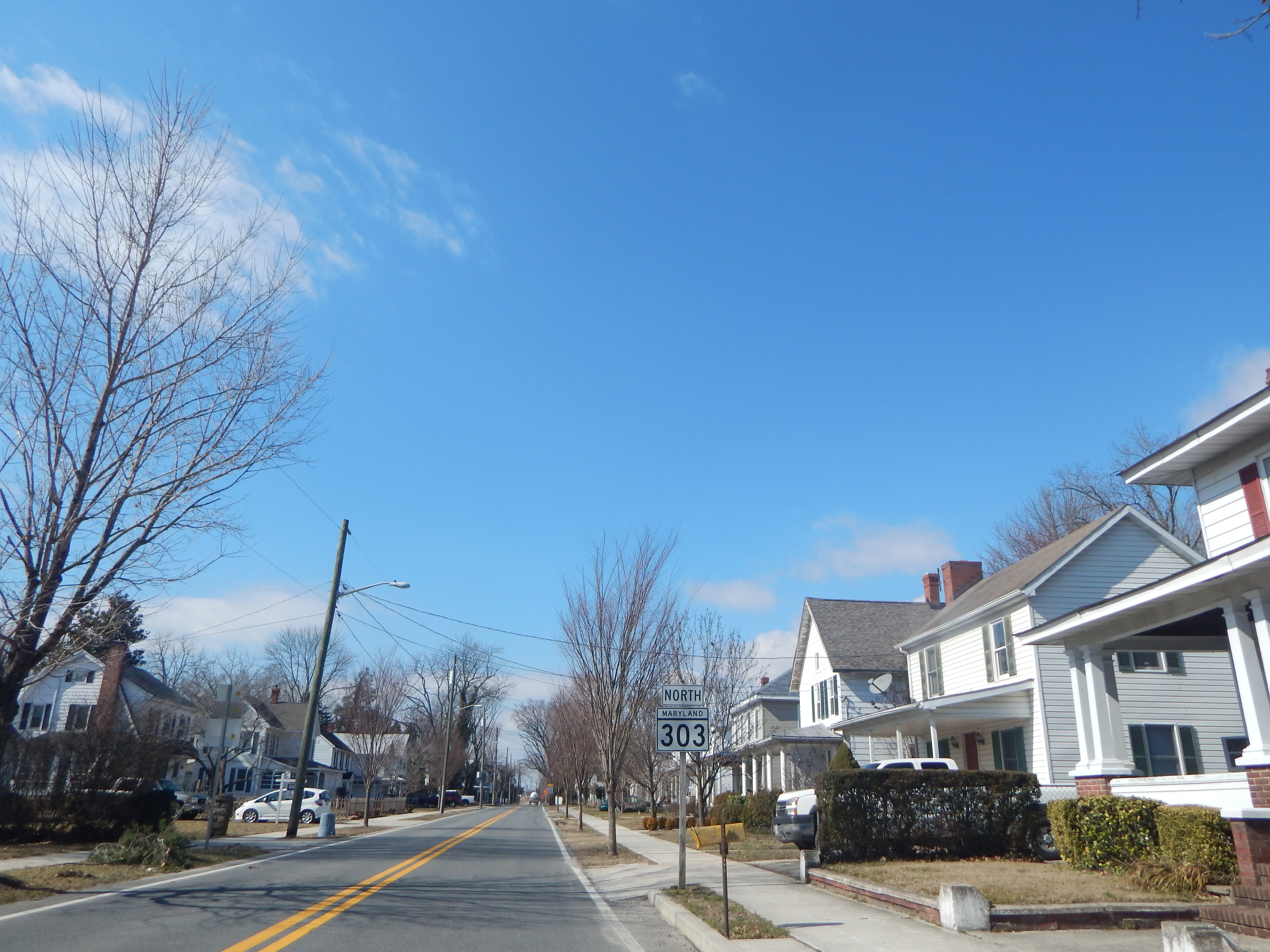
- Grain elevators at the edge of town and Main Street in Queen Anne

- Location of Queen Anne, Maryland

- Location within the U.S. state of Maryland Queen Anne (the United States)
- Coordinates: 38°55′9″N 75°57′10″W
- Country: United States
- State: Maryland
- Counties: Talbot, Queen Anne's
- Incorporated: 1953

Area
  - Total: 0.14 sq mi (0.36 km^{2})
  - Land: 0.14 sq mi (0.36 km^{2})
  - Water: 0 sq mi (0.00 km^{2})
- Elevation: 30 ft (9 m)

Population (2020)
  - Total: 192
  - Density: 1,395.0/sq mi (538.61/km^{2})
- Time zone: UTC-5 (Eastern (EST))
  - Summer (DST): UTC-4 (EDT)
- ZIP code: 21657
- Area code: 410
- FIPS code: 24-64500
- GNIS feature ID: 0597934

Queen Anne is a town in Queen Anne and Talbot counties in the U.S. state of Maryland. As of the 2020 census, Queen Anne had a population of 192.

== Geography ==
Queen Anne is located at 38°55′09″N 75°57′10″W (38.919039, -75.952827).

According to the United States Census Bureau, the town has a total area of 0.13 square miles (0.34 km^{2}), all land.

Tuckahoe Creek passes by the town. The likely birthplace of Frederick Douglass is 2–3 miles south, near the banks of the Tuckahoe. Maryland Route 404 passes to the north of town. Tuckahoe State Park is a short ride north of MD 404. The border between Talbot County and Queen Anne's County runs through the middle of town.

== History ==
According to the Maryland Municipal League:

In the 1850s, the area that is now the town of Queen Anne, was part of a 225-acre farm owned by Jacob Morgan. Initially, the town nucleus was nothing but a 1½-story dwelling, but in 1864 Mr. Morgan built a more substantial place—it was known locally as “the mansion house,” and the locale was known as Morganville.

At that time, the Pennsylvania Railroad had been laid as far south as Greensboro and, a little later, to Ridgely and Hillsboro and thence across Tuckahoe Creek. In 1878, the railroad purchased a site for a station across the creek in Queen Anne’s County, and, quite logically, named it Queen Anne when the station was finally put into service about 1882.

The train station made Queen Anne a good location for sending agricultural products to large cities. Middlemen would bring milk in cans from local dairy farms to the station. Several houses in town were converted to small hotels to accommodate these people.

== Transportation ==
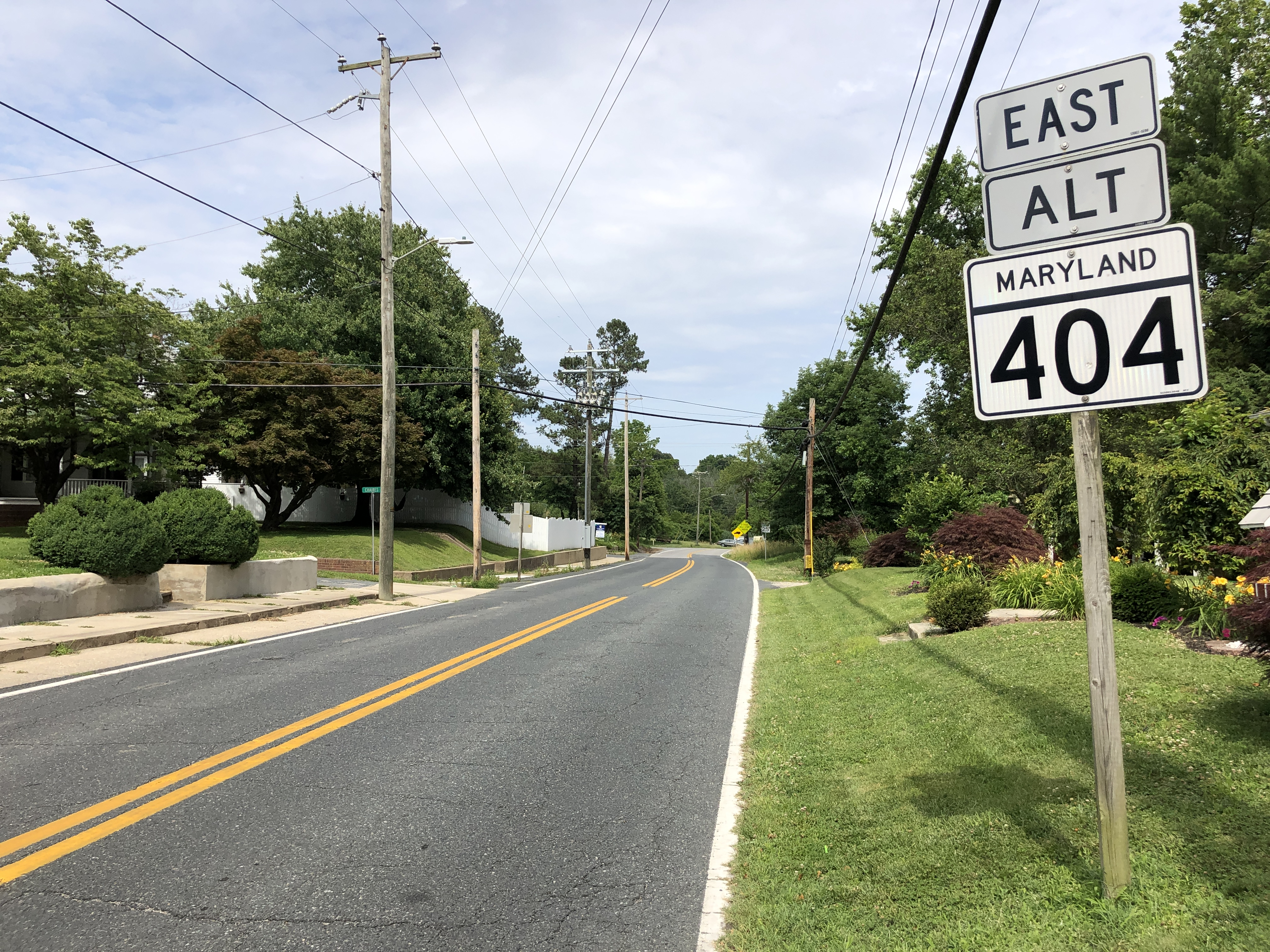
MD 404 Alternate in Queen Anne

The primary means of travel to and from Queen Anne is by road. Maryland Route 404 Alternate, Maryland Route 303 and Maryland Route 518 are the state highways directly serving the town. Maryland Route 404 and Maryland Route 309 pass just outside the town corporate limits to the north and west.

== Demographics ==
Historical population
Census	Pop.	Note	%±
1880	58		—
1960	283		—
1970	292		3.2%
1980	259		−11.3%
1990	250		−3.5%
2000	176		−29.6%
2010	222		26.1%
2020	192		−13.5%
U.S. Decennial Census

=== 2010 census ===
As of the census of 2010, there were 222 people, 83 households, and 54 families living in the town. The population density was 1,707.7 inhabitants per square mile (659.3/km^{2}). There were 89 housing units at an average density of 684.6 per square mile (264.3/km^{2}). The racial makeup of the town was 94.6% White, 2.3% African American, 1.8% Asian, and 1.4% from two or more races.

There were 83 households, of which 42.2% had children under the age of 18 living with them, 54.2% were married couples living together, 8.4% had a female householder with no husband present, 2.4% had a male householder with no wife present, and 34.9% were non-families. 24.1% of all households were made up of individuals, and 9.6% had someone living alone who was 65 years of age or older. The average household size was 2.67 and the average family size was 3.28.

The median age in the town was 34.8 years. 27% of residents were under the age of 18; 10% were between the ages of 18 and 24; 27% were from 25 to 44; 26.2% were from 45 to 64; and 9.9% were 65 years of age or older. The gender makeup of the town was 48.2% male and 51.8% female.

=== 2000 census ===
As of the census of 2000, there were 176 people, 67 households, and 52 families living in the town. The population density was 1,425.0 inhabitants per square mile (550.2/km^{2}). There were 72 housing units at an average density of 583.0 per square mile (225.1/km^{2}). The racial makeup of the town was 97.16% White, 0.57% African American, 0.57% Native American, 1.14% Asian and 0.57% Pacific Islander.

There were 67 households, out of which 43.3% had children under the age of 18 living with them, 62.7% were married couples living together, 10.4% had a female householder with no husband present, and 20.9% were non-families. 16.4% of all households were made up of individuals, and 7.5% had someone living alone who was 65 years of age or older. The average household size was 2.63 and the average family size was 2.89.

In the town, the population was spread out, with 30.1% under the age of 18, 3.4% from 18 to 24, 29.0% from 25 to 44, 24.4% from 45 to 64, and 13.1% who were 65 years of age or older. The median age was 39 years. For every 100 females, there were 107.1 males. For every 100 females age 18 and over, there were 98.4 males.

The median income for a household in the town was $45,000, and the median income for a family was $55,417. Males had a median income of $31,806 versus $23,542 for females. The per capita income for the town was $16,016. About 2.0% of families and 4.0% of the population were below the poverty line, including 6.8% of those under the age of eighteen and none of those 65 or over.
