= Andersontown, Maryland =

Unincorporated community in Maryland, United States

- Populated place
- Location within Maryland Location within the United States
- Coordinates: 38.836933°N 75.780752°W
- Country: United States
- State: Maryland
- County: Caroline
- Elevation: 52 ft (16 m)
- GNIS feature ID: 589643

Andersontown is a populated place on Maryland's Eastern Shore in Caroline County, Maryland, United States. It is situated near the Delaware line, centered on the intersection of Andersontown Road and Maryland Route 404.

== History ==
One of the first mentions of Andersontown is the Andersontown Post office on the 1875 Map of Caroline County. On the 1897 Map of Caroline County, It is referred to as Andersontown.
