= Maryland Route 619 =

State highway in Maryland, United States

Maryland Route 619
- Sixth Street

Route information
- Maintained by MDSHA
- Length: 1.09 mi (1.75 km)
- Existed: 1978–present
- Tourist routes: Harriet Tubman Underground Railroad Byway

Major junctions
- South end: 5th Avenue in Denton
- MD 404 Bus. in Denton
- North end: MD 313 / MD 404 in Denton

Location
- Country: United States
- State: Maryland
- Counties: Caroline

Highway system
- Maryland highway system; Interstate; US; State; Scenic Byways
← MD 617	→ MD 623

Maryland Route 619 (MD 619) is a state highway in the U.S. state of Maryland. Known as Sixth Street, the state highway runs 1.09 miles (1.75 km) from an intersection with 5th Avenue north to an interchange with MD 313 and MD 404 within the town of Denton in central Caroline County. MD 619 is the old alignment of MD 313 and part of MD 404 through Denton. The state highway was designated south of present MD 404 Business when MD 404 and MD 313 were relocated on the south side of Denton in the early 1970s. MD 619 was extended to its current length when MD 404 and MD 313 were moved to the Denton Bypass in 1987.

== Route description ==
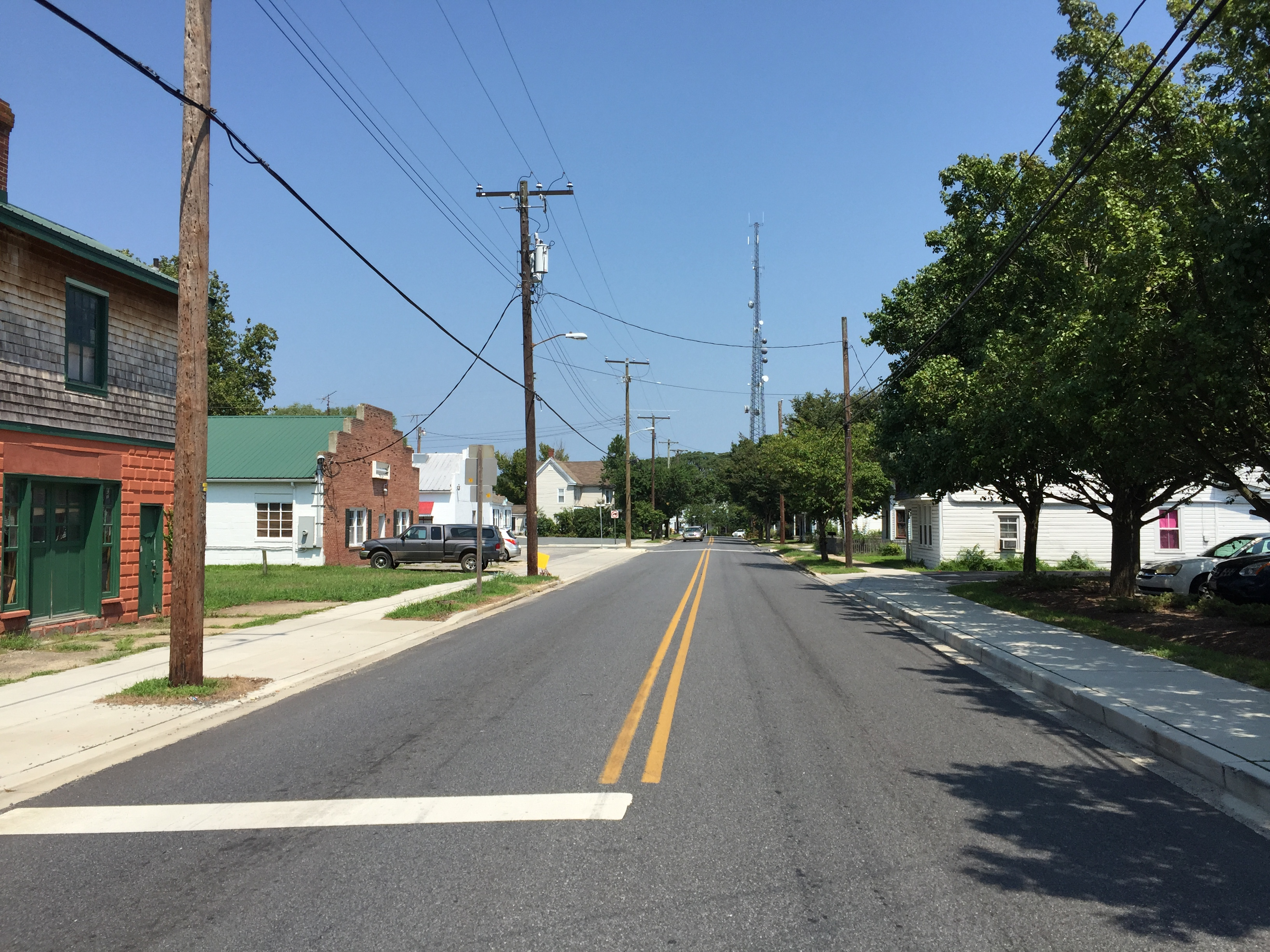
View north along MD 619 at MD 404 Bus. in downtown Denton

MD 619 begins at an intersection with 5th Avenue on the south side of Denton. The state highway heads north on two-lane undivided Sixth Street through a residential area. East of the downtown area, MD 619 meets MD 404 Business, which follows a one-way pair on eastbound Franklin Street and westbound Gay Street. Between the two streets, MD 619 intersects Market Street, which was the original alignment of MD 404 through downtown Denton. The state highway continues north through a mix of residences and businesses, passing Camp Road before reaching its northern terminus at a diamond interchange with the Denton Bypass, which carries MD 404 to the west of the interchange and both MD 404 and MD 313 to the east. The roadway continues north as MD 313 (Greensboro Road).

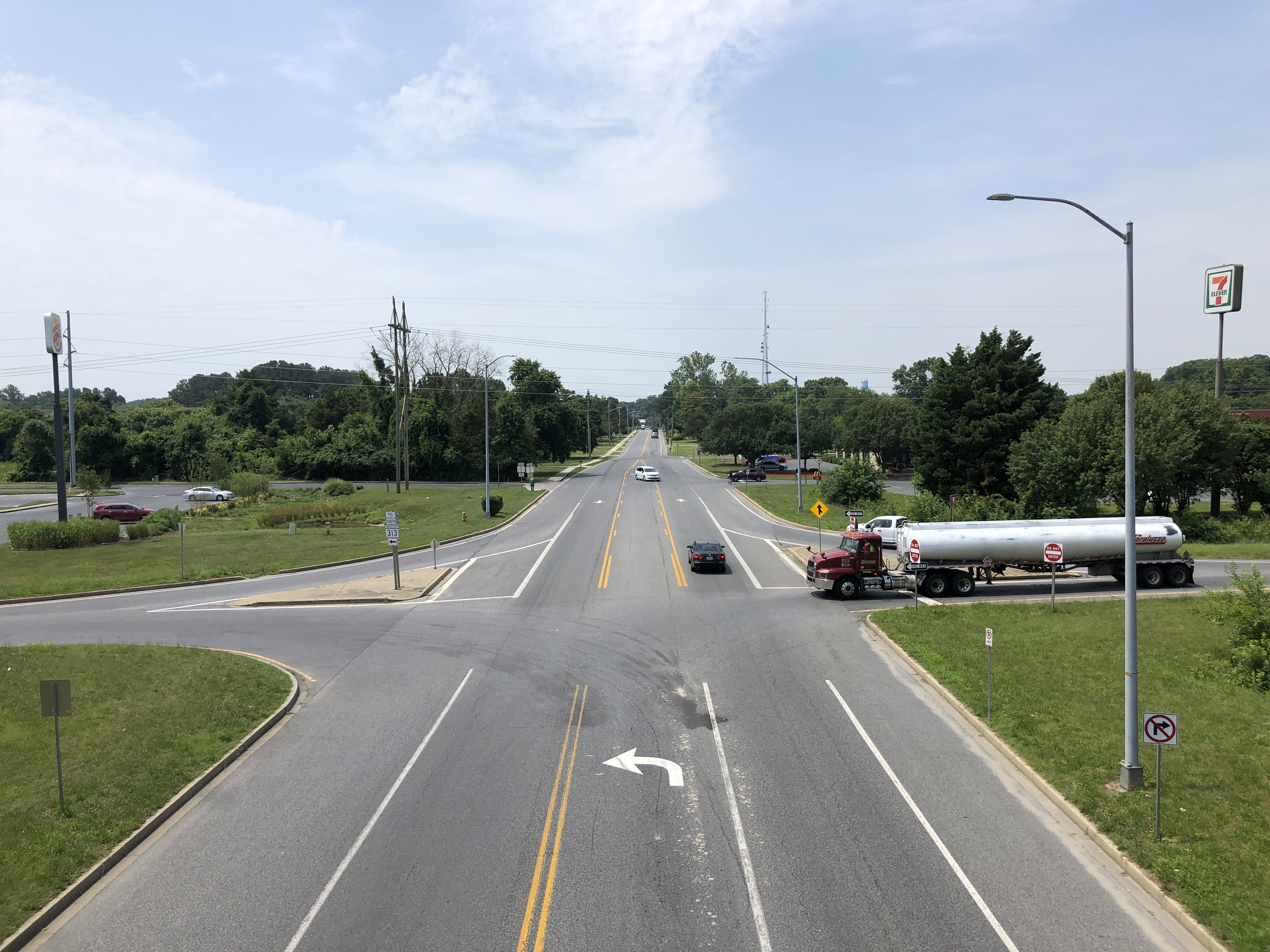
MD 619 southbound at MD 313 and MD 404 in Denton

== History ==
MD 619 comprises part of the old alignment of MD 313 and MD 404 through Denton. MD 313 followed Fifth Avenue and Sixth Street from south to north, while MD 404 entered the town on Market Street and exited to the south concurrent with MD 313. MD 619 was designated between Fifth Avenue and Franklin Street by 1978 after MD 404 and MD 313 were relocated to a one-way pair, eastbound Franklin Street and westbound Gay Street, through Denton in 1972. MD 619 was extended to its present northern terminus when MD 404 and MD 313 were moved from the streets of Denton to the Denton bypass in 1987.

== Junction list ==
The entire route is in Denton, Caroline County.

mi	km	Destinations	Notes
0.00	0.00	5th Avenue	Southern terminus
0.19	0.31	MD 404 Bus. east (Franklin Street)	
0.33	0.53	MD 404 Bus. west (Gay Street)	
1.09	1.75	MD 404 (Shore Highway) / MD 313 (Greensboro Road) – Bay Bridge, Ocean Resorts, Greensboro	Northern terminus; diamond interchange
1.000 mi = 1.609 km; 1.000 km = 0.621 mi

== Auxiliary route ==
MD 619B is the designation for a 0.11-mile (0.18 km) section of Legion Road that serves as a connector between MD 404 and MD 313 at the southern end of the Denton Bypass and 5th Avenue. 5th Avenue continues south as a municipal street that serves a few residences and a shopping center before ending at Sharp Road.
