= Cordova, Maryland =

- Census-designated place
- Location of Cordova, Maryland
- Coordinates: 38°52′40″N 75°59′28″W
- Country: United States
- State: Maryland
- County: Talbot

Area
  - Total: 4.87 sq mi (12.62 km^{2})
  - Land: 4.87 sq mi (12.62 km^{2})
  - Water: 0 sq mi (0.00 km^{2})
- Elevation: 46 ft (14 m)

Population (2020)
  - Total: 551
  - Density: 113.1/sq mi (43.66/km^{2})
- Time zone: UTC−5 (Eastern (EST))
  - Summer (DST): UTC−4 (EDT)
- ZIP code: 21625
- Area code: 410
- FIPS code: 24-19900
- GNIS feature ID: 0590022

Cordova is a census-designated place (CDP) in Talbot County, Maryland, United States. The population was 551 at the 2020 census, down from 592 at the 2000 census. Outside of the town was the likely birthplace of Frederick Douglass, an American social reformer, abolitionist, orator, writer, and statesman.

== Geography ==
Cordova is located at 38°52′40″N 75°59′28″W (38.877699, −75.990973).

According to the United States Census Bureau, the CDP has a total area of 4.9 square miles (13 km^{2}), all land.

It is located north of Easton, east of U.S. Route 50.

== Demographics ==
Historical population
Census	Pop.	Note	%±
2000	592		—
2010	509		−14.0%
2020	551		8.3%

As of the census of 2000, there were 592 people, 214 households, and 167 families residing in the CDP. The population density was 122.0 inhabitants per square mile (47.1/km^{2}). There were 230 housing units at an average density of 47.4 units per square mile (18.3 units/km^{2}). The racial makeup of the CDP was 89.70% White, 9.80% African American, 0.17% Native American, 0.17% from other races, and 0.17% from two or more races. Hispanic or Latino of any race were 1.69% of the population.

There were 214 households, out of which 39.7% had children under the age of 18 living with them, 61.7% were married couples living together, 11.7% had a female householder with no husband present, and 21.5% were non-families. 18.7% of all households were made up of individuals, and 9.3% had someone living alone who was 65 years of age or older. The average household size was 2.77 and the average family size was 3.15.

In the CDP, the population was spread out, with 28.9% under the age of 18, 7.9% from 18 to 24, 28.7% from 25 to 44, 24.2% from 45 to 64, and 10.3% who were 65 years of age or older. The median age was 35 years. For every 100 females, there were 89.7 males. For every 100 females age 18 and over, there were 85.5 males.

The median income for a household in the CDP was $35,625, and the median income for a family was $46,250. Males had a median income of $34,792 versus $27,500 for females. The per capita income for the CDP was $15,534. About 17.9% of families and 10.5% of the population were below the poverty line, including 11.4% of those under age 18 and 23.1% of those age 65 or over.

As of 2012, out of the residents ages 25 and over, 73.9% possess a high school degree, 5.2% possess a bachelor's degree, and 2.4% possess a graduate or bachelor's degree. For the population of residents 15 and over, 24.9% have never been married, 58.8% are now married, 2% are separated, 1.7% are widowed, and 12.7% are divorced.

There were 49 veterans living in Cordova as of 2011.

== History ==
Just north of town, St. Joseph Roman Catholic Church was founded on a farm in 1765.

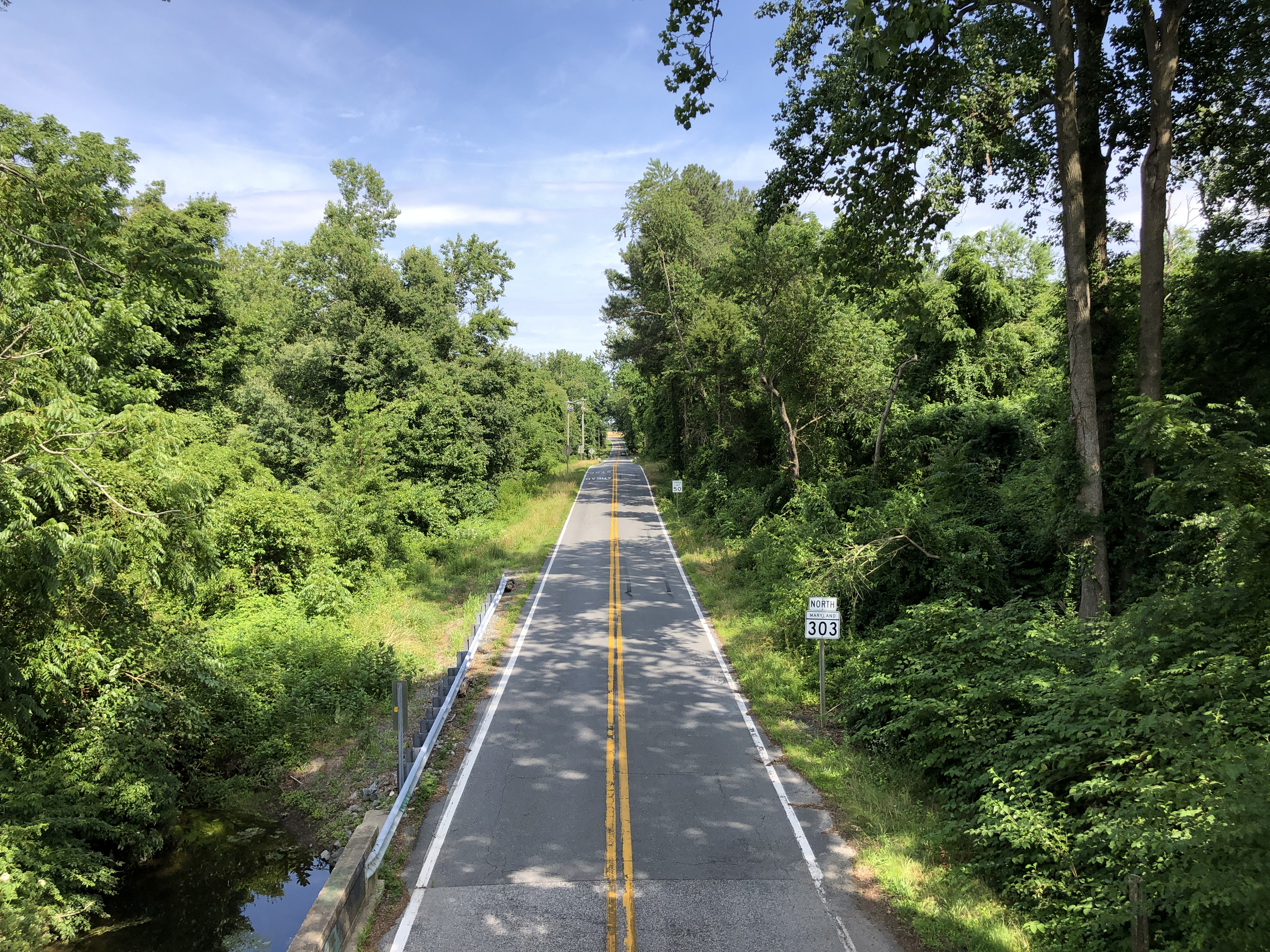
View north along Maryland State Route 303 (Tappers Corner Road)

Tapper's Corner Road runs east of town to Lewistown Road, near the head of a creek which flows (38.8845°N 75.958°W) into the Tuckahoe; this creek was called Kentucky, nearby once stood the cabin of Betsey Bailey, the grandmother of Frederick Douglass; he believed he was born there.

A gas station on the main road operated for many years. Remnants of the service station still stand. Many homes located within the village center were built by ordering from Sears. Lumber was shipped to Cordova via the railroad in the 1920s and 1930s. At one time the town had a doctors office and general store that are now homes. This town had a cannery and chicken processing plant.

Since 1962, the Cordova Volunteer Fireman's Association has held a 3-night country fair starting the first Thursday of August on the grounds behind the firehouse.

On May 18, 1995, an F2 tornado touched down in the town and left a 10-mile path of destruction with over $1 million in damage.
