= Tuckahoe Creek =

Creek in Maryland

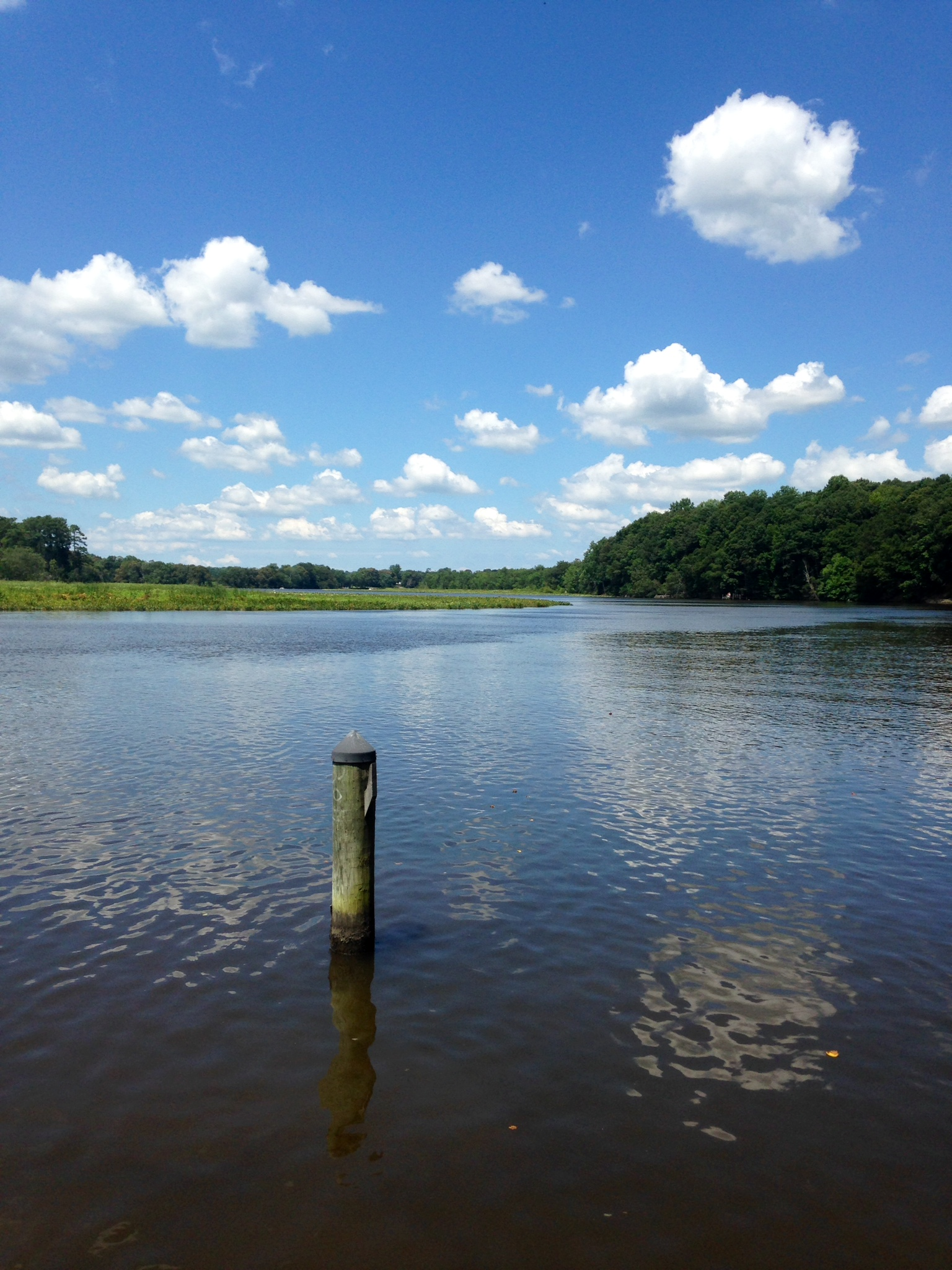
The Tuckahoe Creek viewed from Denton, Maryland

Tuckahoe Creek is a 21.5-mile-long (34.6 km) tributary of the Choptank River on Maryland's Eastern Shore. It is sometimes (erroneously) referred to as the Tuckahoe River. Upstream of Hillsboro, it forms the boundary between Caroline County and Queen Anne's County, passing through Tuckahoe State Park and dividing the small towns of Queen Anne and Hillsboro. Downstream of Hillsboro, it forms the boundary between Caroline County and Talbot County, before flowing into the Choptank.

Two miles south of Queen Anne, east of where Tapper's Corner Road ends at Lewistown Road, a creek flows (38.8845°N 75.958°W) into the Tuckahoe near the most likely birthplace of Frederick Douglass.

== See also ==
- List of rivers of Maryland
