= Denton, Maryland =

- Town
- Town of Denton
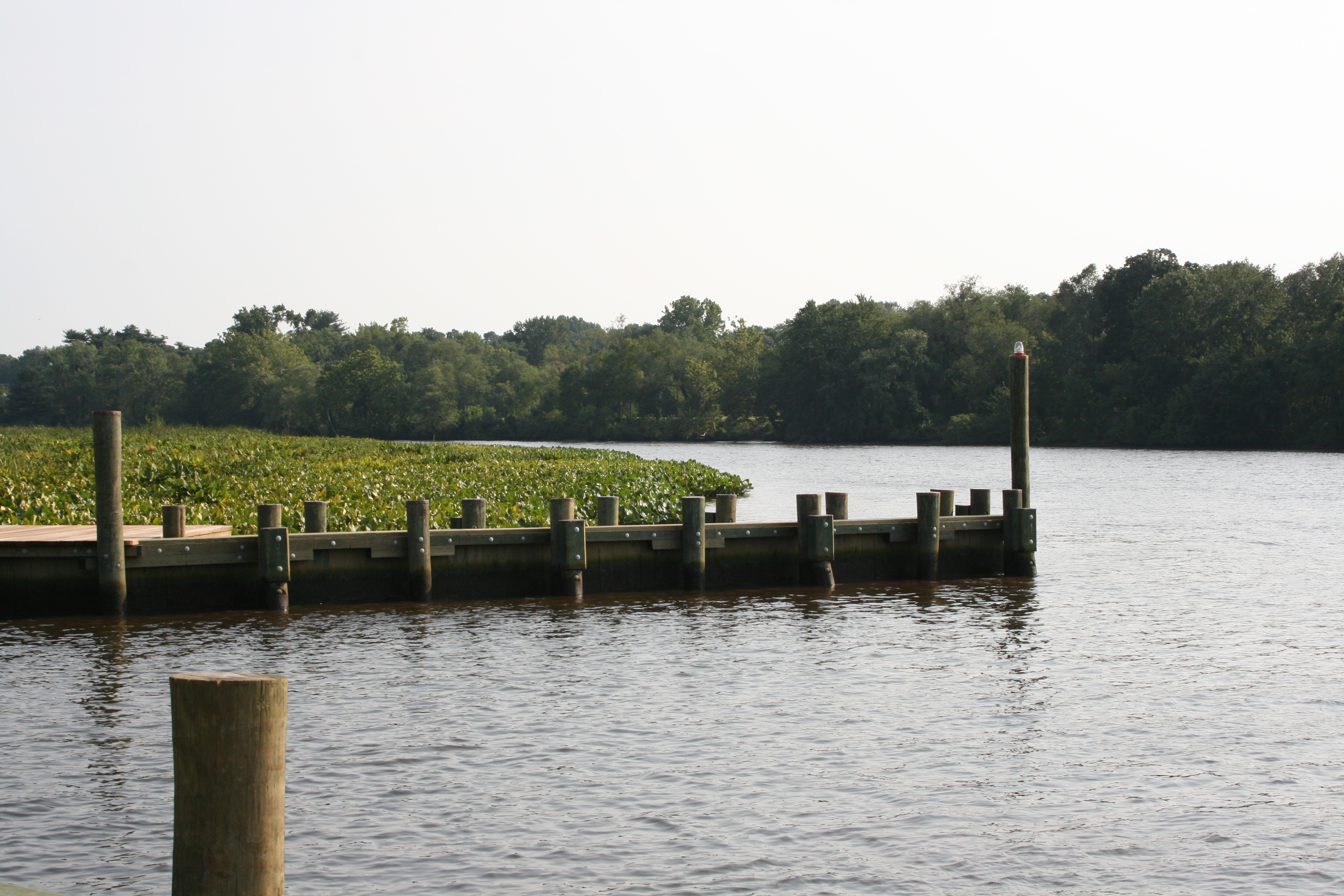
- The Choptank River in July 2008

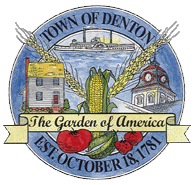
- Flag Seal
- Motto: "The Garden of America"
- Location in Caroline County and the U.S. state of Maryland

- Location within the U.S. state of Maryland Denton (the United States)
- Coordinates: 38°53′2″N 75°49′36″W
- Country: United States of America
- State: Maryland
- County: Caroline
- Founded: 1781
- Incorporated: 1802

Government
  - Mayor: Abigail McNinch
  - Town Admin.: Scott Getchell

Area
  - Total: 5.35 sq mi (13.86 km^{2})
  - Land: 5.27 sq mi (13.64 km^{2})
  - Water: 0.085 sq mi (0.22 km^{2})
- Elevation: 43 ft (13 m)

Population (2020)
  - Total: 4,848
  - Density: 920.4/sq mi (355.35/km^{2})
- Time zone: UTC−5 (Eastern (EST))
  - Summer (DST): UTC−4 (EDT)
- ZIP code: 21629
- Area code: 410
- FIPS code: 24-22725
- GNIS feature ID: 0590087
- Website: www.DentonMaryland.com

Denton is a town in Caroline County, Maryland, United States. As of the 2020 census, Denton had a population of 4,848. It is the county seat of Caroline County.

== History ==
Denton was established in 1781. It was first called Eden Town, for Sir Robert Eden, the last royal governor of Maryland, and over time, Eden Town was shortened to Denton. The town was incorporated in 1802.

The town benefited from trade shipped along the adjacent Choptank River. Shipyards along the river serviced smaller sail and steamships plying their trade on the river, with most traffic flowing down to the larger town of Cambridge. The Choptank was deep enough to pose a formidable barrier to enslaved people fleeing north to freedom. Irish-American abolitionist Hugh Hazlett and a group of escaped slaves were detained near the town in 1858, with a plaque commemorating the event.

The steamship trade began in 1840s and ended in the 1920s. Steamships carried passengers and goods from Denton to Cambridge and other communities on the Chesapeake.

The Museum of Rural Life interprets the agriculture-based heritage of the town and surrounding area. A historic steamboat pier is preserved in the town.

== Geography ==
Denton is located at 38°53′2″N 75°49′36″W (38.883853, -75.826556).

According to the United States Census Bureau, the town has a total area of 5.50 square miles (14.24 km^{2}), of which 0.22 square miles (0.57 km^{2}) is covered by water.

=== Climate ===
The climate in this area is characterized by hot, humid summers and generally mild to cool winters. According to the Köppen climate classification, Denton has a humid subtropical climate, Cfa on climate maps.

== Demographics ==
Historical population
| Census | Pop. | Note | %± |
|---|---|---|---|
| 1870 | 431 | | — |
| 1880 | 469 | | 8.8% |
| 1890 | 641 | | 36.7% |
| 1900 | 900 | | 40.4% |
| 1910 | 1,481 | | 64.6% |
| 1920 | 1,570 | | 6.0% |
| 1930 | 1,604 | | 2.2% |
| 1940 | 1,572 | | −2.0% |
| 1950 | 1,806 | | 14.9% |
| 1960 | 1,938 | | 7.3% |
| 1970 | 1,561 | | −19.5% |
| 1980 | 1,927 | | 23.4% |
| 1990 | 2,977 | | 54.5% |
| 2000 | 2,960 | | −0.6% |
| 2010 | 4,418 | | 49.3% |
| 2020 | 4,848 | | 9.7% |
U.S. Decennial Census

=== 2020 census ===
As of the 2020 census, Denton had a population of 4,848. The median age was 36.6 years. 26.6% of residents were under the age of 18 and 17.0% of residents were 65 years of age or older. For every 100 females there were 85.9 males, and for every 100 females age 18 and over there were 79.2 males age 18 and over.

98.5% of residents lived in urban areas, while 1.5% lived in rural areas.

There were 1,730 households in Denton, of which 38.8% had children under the age of 18 living in them. Of all households, 38.7% were married-couple households, 15.9% were households with a male householder and no spouse or partner present, and 37.0% were households with a female householder and no spouse or partner present. About 28.2% of all households were made up of individuals and 12.2% had someone living alone who was 65 years of age or older.

There were 1,864 housing units, of which 7.2% were vacant. The homeowner vacancy rate was 3.0% and the rental vacancy rate was 6.7%.

Racial composition as of the 2020 census
| Race | Number | Percent |
|---|---|---|
| White | 3,128 | 64.5% |
| Black or African American | 1,065 | 22.0% |
| American Indian and Alaska Native | 41 | 0.8% |
| Asian | 120 | 2.5% |
| Native Hawaiian and Other Pacific Islander | 2 | 0.0% |
| Some other race | 144 | 3.0% |
| Two or more races | 348 | 7.2% |
| Hispanic or Latino (of any race) | 298 | 6.1% |

=== 2010 census ===
As of the census of 2010, 4,418 people, 1,606 households, and 1,034 families were living in the town. The population density was 836.7 inhabitants per square mile (323.1/km^{2}). The 1,791 housing units had an average density of 339.2 per square mile (131.0/km^{2}). The racial makeup of the town was 71.8% White, 22.9% African American, 0.4% Native American, 0.6% Asian, 1.0% from other races, and 3.1% from two or more races. Hispanics or Latinos of any race were 3.3% of the population.

Of the 1,606 households, 38.6% had children under18 living with them, 40.7% were married couples living together, 18.7% had a female householder with no husband present, 4.9% had a male householder with no wife present, and 35.6% were not families. About 29.3% of all households were made up of individuals, and 13% had someone living alone who was 65 or older. The average household size was 2.56 and the average family size was 3.17.

The median age in the town was 35.8 years; 26.6% of residents were under 18; 8.2% were between 18 and 24; 27.1% were from 25 to 44; 23.1% were from 45 to 64; and 15.1% were 65 or older. The gender makeup of the town was 46.7% male and 53.3% female.

=== 2000 census ===
As of the census of 2000, 2,960 people, 1,140 households, and 697 families lived in the town. The population density was 1,205.0 inhabitants per square mile (465.3/km^{2}). The 1,264 housing units had an average density of 514.6 per square mile (198.7/km^{2}). The racial makeup of the town was 71.66% White, 25.44% African American, 0.34% Native American, 0.37% Asian, 0.24% from other races, and 1.96% from two or more races. Hispanics or Latinos of any race were 1.86% of the population.

Of the 1,140 households, 31.1% had children under 18 living with them, 37.7% were married couples living together, 17.7% had a female householder with no husband present, and 38.8% were not families. About 33.5% of all households were made up of individuals, and 15.0% had someone living alone who was 65 or older. The average household size was 2.29 and the average family size was 2.90.

In the town, the age distribution was 23.3% under 18, 8.3% from 18 to 24, 26.8% from 25 to 44, 19.6% from 45 to 64, and 22.0% who were 65 age or older. The median age was 39 years. For every 100 females, there were 87.3 males. For every 100 females 18 and over, there were 80.4 males.

The median income for a household in the town was $34,936, and for a family was $42,583. Males had a median income of $27,475 versus $20,504 for females. The per capita income for the town was $18,631. About 6.6% of families and 8.1% of the population were below the poverty line, including 7.4% of those under 18 and 7.6% of those 65 or over.

== Government ==
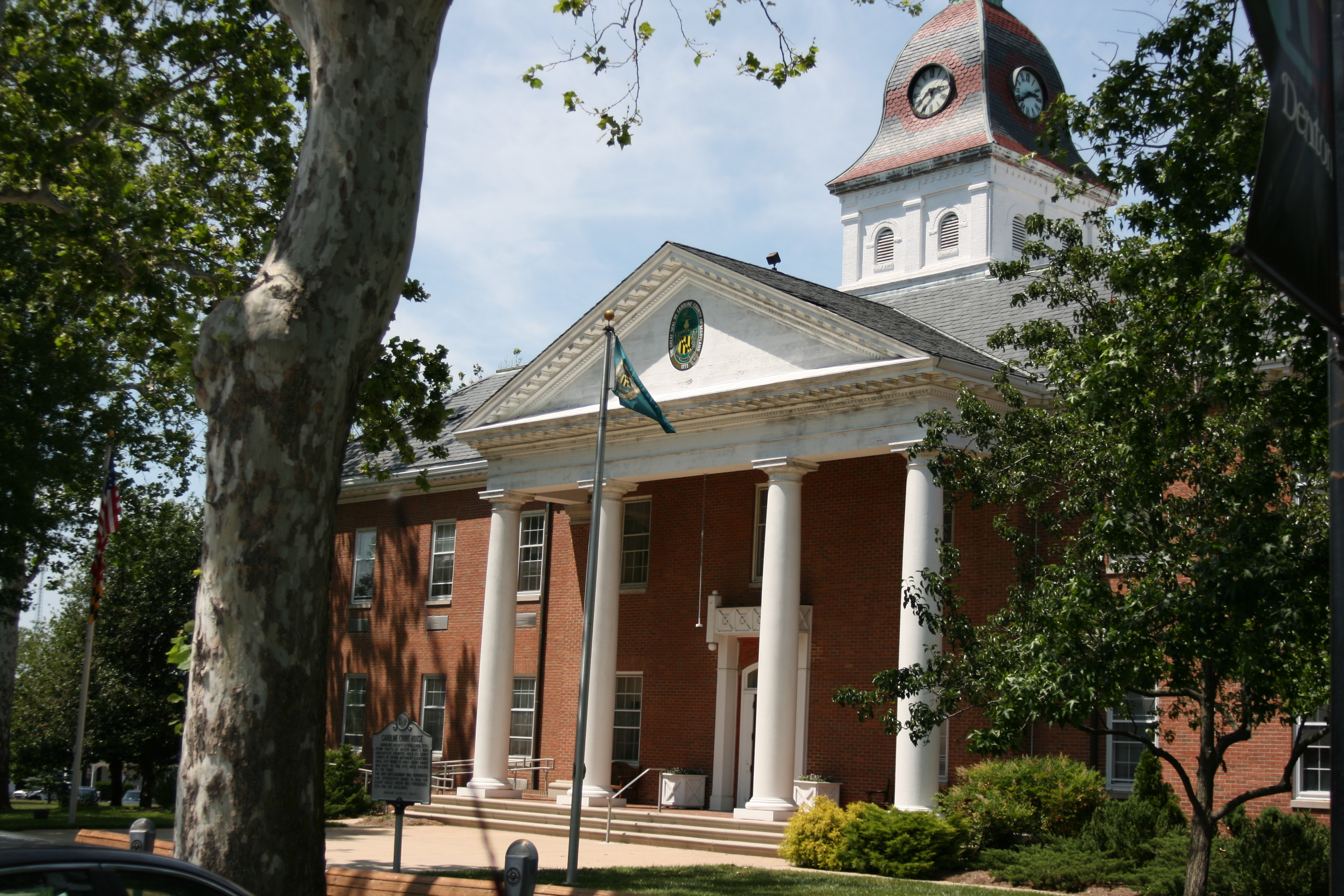
The Caroline County Courthouse in June 2012

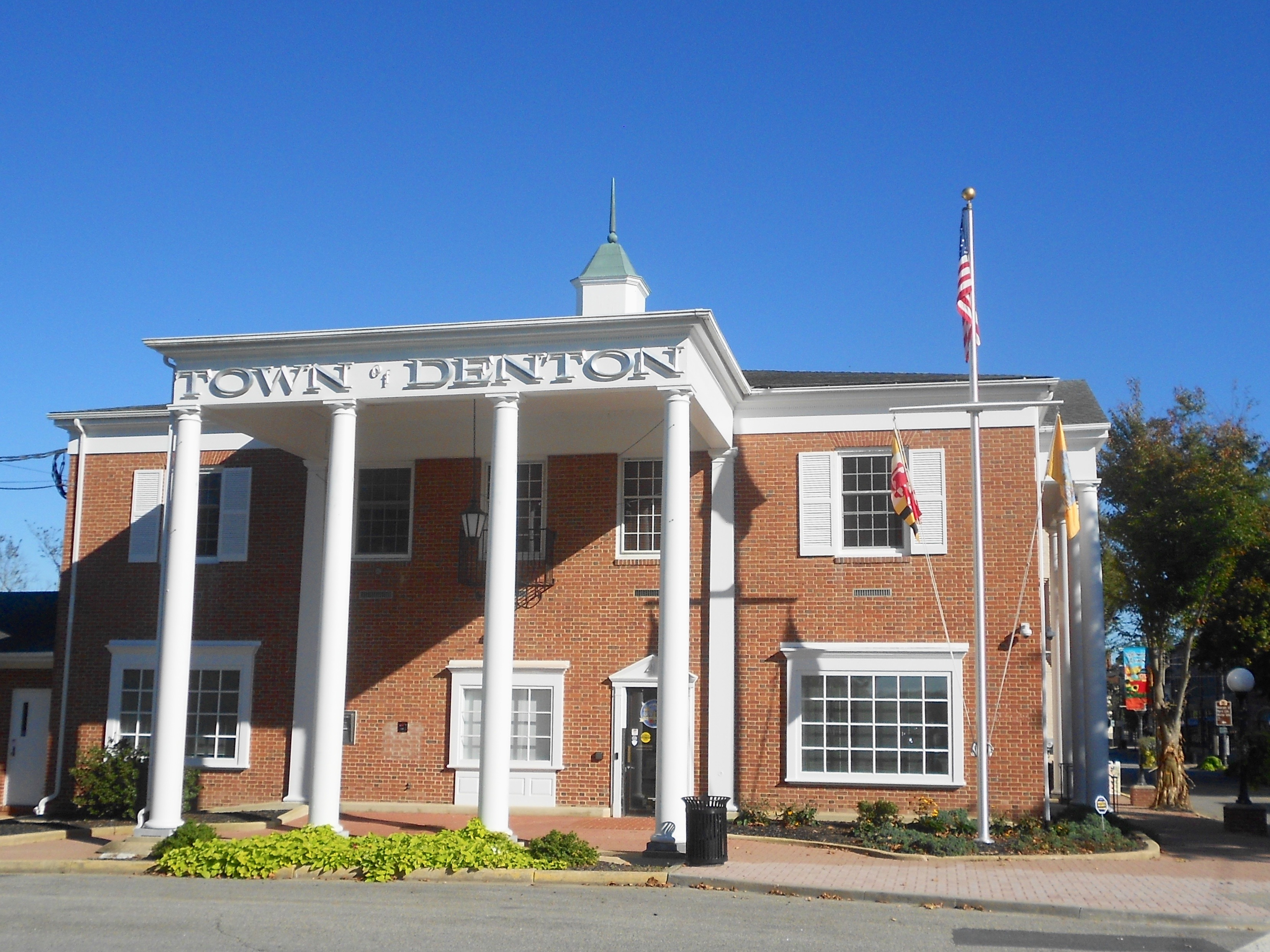
Town Hall

== Media ==
Denton is home to WKDI radio (840 AM). It also is served by a weekly newspaper, the Times-Record, and a monthly magazine, the Caroline Review.

== Infrastructure ==
=== Transportation ===
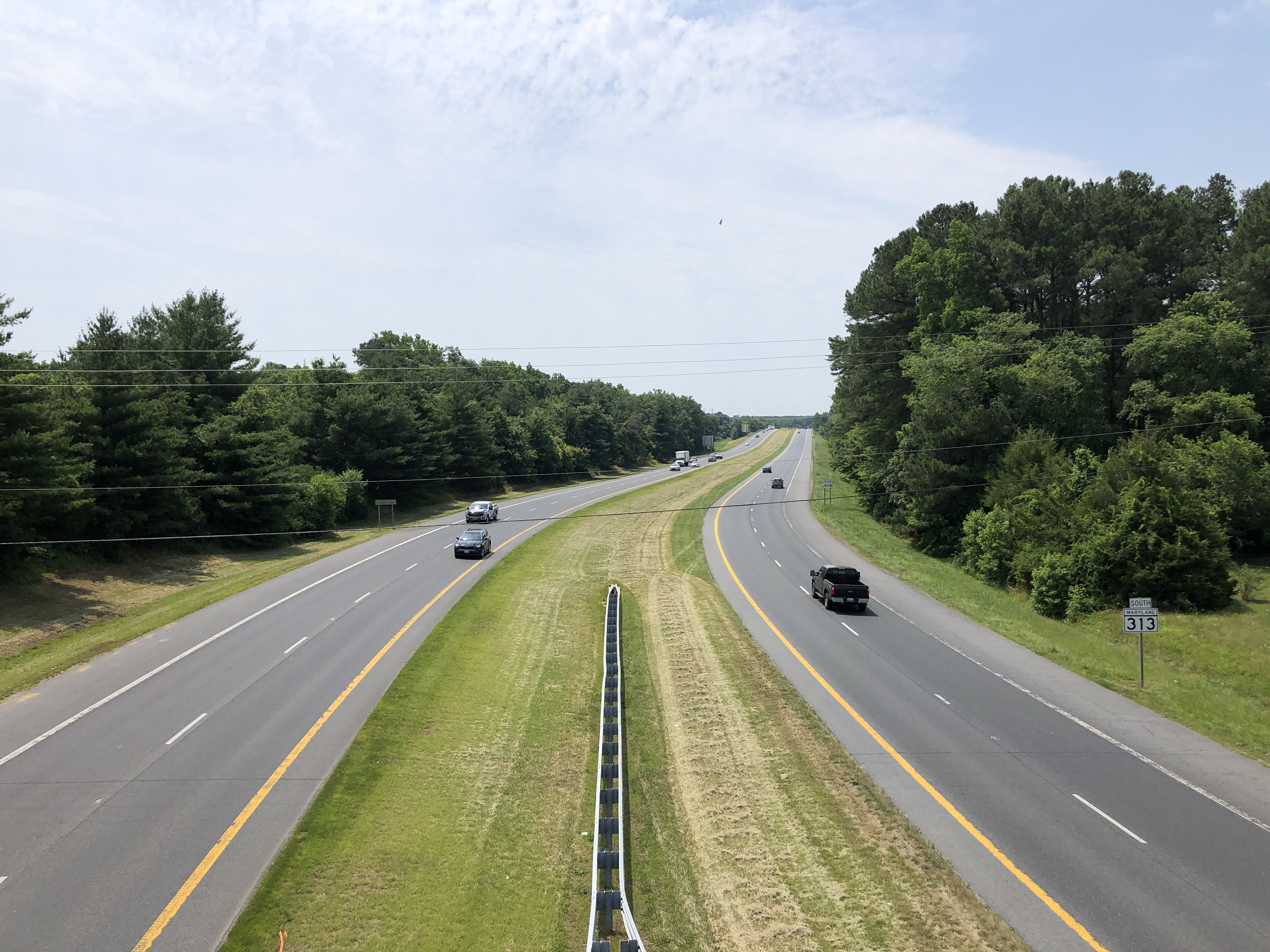
MD 313 southbound and MD 404 eastbound in Denton

The town is served by Maryland Routes 404, 313, 328, 16, and 619. MD 404 bypasses Denton to the north and east and serves as the main route between the Chesapeake Bay Bridge to the west and the Delaware Beaches to the east. A business route, MD 404 Business, passes through the center of Denton. MD 313 follows MD 404 around the east side of Denton and runs north to Greensboro and south to Federalsburg. MD 328 begins at MD 404 in West Denton and heads southwest to Easton. MD 16 passes to the south of Denton and heads west to Preston and Cambridge and east along MD 404 toward the Delaware border. MD 619 heads from MD 404 Business in the center of Denton north to MD 313 and MD 404 on the northern part of the town. Denton borders the Choptank River. Delmarva Community Transit provides bus service to Denton along multiple routes offering service to Easton, Federalsburg, Preston, and Greensboro.

The American Discovery Trail runs through the town.

=== Utilities ===
Delmarva Power, a subsidiary of Exelon, provides electricity to Denton. Chesapeake Utilities provides natural gas to the town. Denton Public Works provides water and sewer service along with trash collection to the town. The town's public works department provides water service to about 1,600 customers and can handle over 1,000,000 gallons in a day. The town operates the Denton Wastewater Treatment Plant, which has an average daily flow of 800,000 gallons and can handle a peak hourly flow of 2.67 million gallons. Curbside trash collection is provided once a week to households in Denton.

== Notable people ==
- Anna Murray-Douglass, abolitionist
- Harry Hughes, former Maryland governor
- Sophie Kerr, author
- Russ Snowberger, racing driver
- Sherman W. Tribbitt, former Delaware governor

== Neighborhoods ==
- Anthony
- Bureau
- Calvert Acres
- Chapel Branch
- Country Club Estates
- Double Hills Estates
- Fairways
- Garland Lake
- Lor-J Estates
- Mallard Landing
- Oil City
- Pealiquor Landing
- Riding Acres
- Riverview Gardens
- Savannah Overlook
- Smith Landing
- Stafford Heights
- Tower Mobile Home Park
- Tuckahoe Springs
- West Denton
- Waymen Wharf
- Williston
