= Tuckahoe State Park =

State park in Maryland, United States

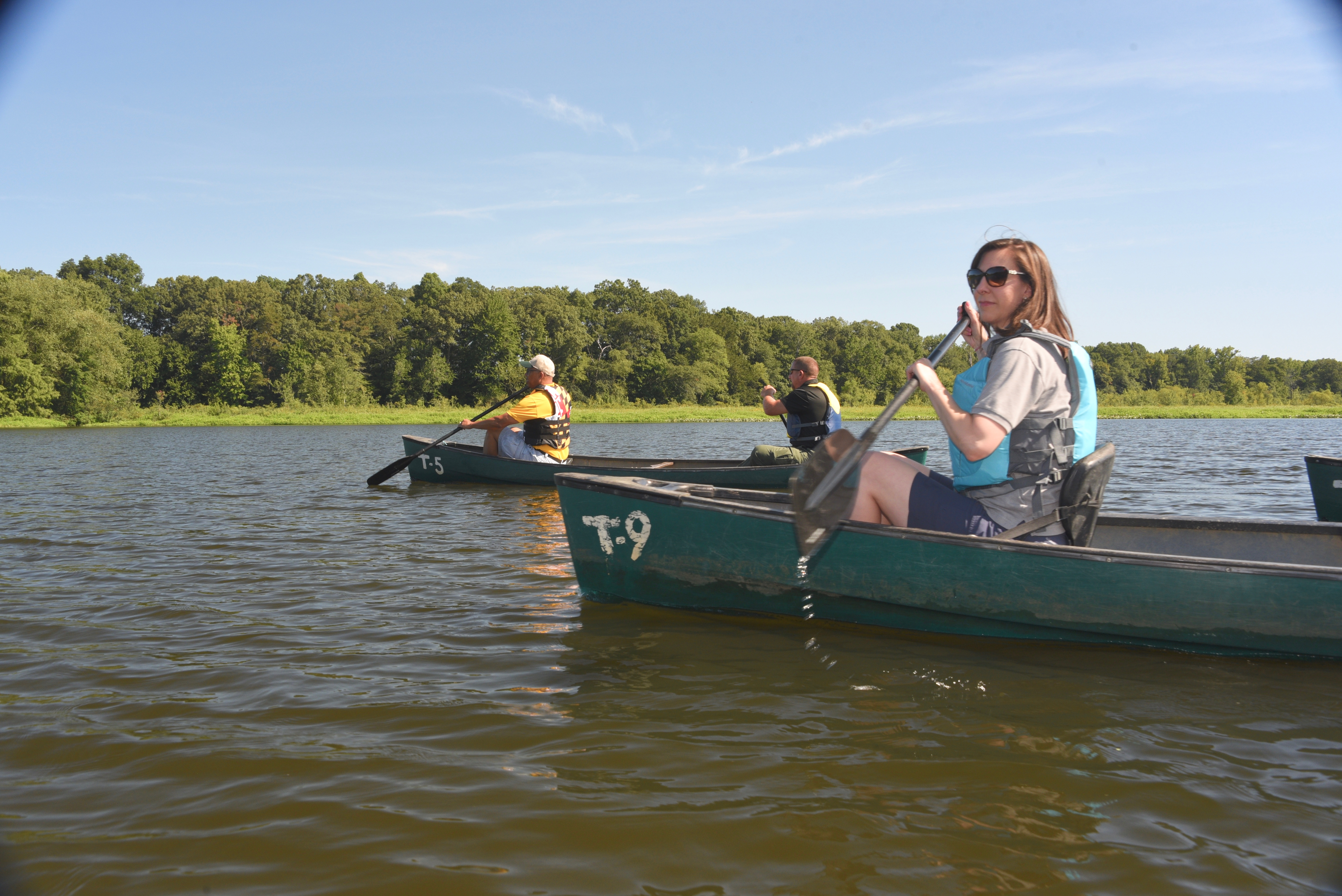

- Location within Maryland
- Location: Caroline and Queen Anne's counties, Maryland, United States
- Coordinates: 38°58′06″N 75°56′31″W
- Area: 3,994 acres (1,616 ha)
- Elevation: 16 ft (4.9 m)
- Established: 1963
- Administrator: Maryland Department of Natural Resources
- Designation: Maryland state park
- Website: Official website

Tuckahoe State Park is a Maryland state park situated along Tuckahoe Creek in Caroline and Queen Anne's counties on the Eastern Shore of Maryland, United States. Adkins Arboretum, a garden and preserve maintaining over 600 native plant species, occupies 500 acres of the park. The arboretum provides classes to the public in horticulture, ecology and natural history.

== Activities and amenities ==
The state park features a 60-acre (24 ha) lake for fishing and boating plus 20 miles (32 km) of trails for hiking, biking, and equestrian use. The park also offers camping, cabins, and hunting as well as a recycled-tire playground for children. The American Discovery Trail runs through the park.

== In the news ==
Residents who felt the quiet, rural nature of the park was threatened spoke out against a military training facility that was proposed to be built nearby in 2009, and plans for it were scrapped in 2010.
