= List of state highways in Maryland =

List of Maryland state highways
- Standard route signs in Maryland

System information
- Maintained by mostly MDSHA; portions of some routes maintained by other agencies and jurisdictions

Highway names
- State: Maryland Route X (MD X)
- Special Routes: Maryland Route X Alternate (MD X Alt.); Maryland Route X Business (MD X Bus.); Maryland Route X Bypass (MD X Byp.); Maryland Route X Truck (MD X Truck)

System links
- Maryland highway system; Interstate; US; State; Scenic Byways

Maryland has an extensive system of state highways, exclusive of the national Interstate and U.S. highway systems, that serves all 23 counties and the independent city of Baltimore, almost every incorporated city, town, and village, and most unincorporated places in the state. These highways are each designated Maryland Route X, where X is a number between 2 and 999. The highways are typically abbreviated MD X, although MD Route X and Route X are used less frequently. Because Maryland does not have a secondary route system or signed county route systems, all state highways are part of the main numerical system. That means the same set of numbers is used for both major highways and minor service roads, and almost every number has been used at one time or another.

The Maryland State Highway Administration constructs and maintains the vast majority of state highways in the 23 counties of Maryland. The Baltimore City Department of Transportation maintains all state highways within the city of Baltimore. Several towns and cities also maintain all or parts of the state highways within their boundaries. There are a few instances where a county department of transportation maintains sections of a state highway. Two unique situations are that MD 200 is maintained by the Maryland Transportation Authority, which controls all of the publicly owned, tolled highways and bridges in the state, and part of MD 295, also known as the Baltimore–Washington Parkway, is maintained by the National Park Service as a National Parkway.

Maryland applies letter suffixes to route numbers as a way of organizing groups of related highways, such as a group of old alignments of a major highway, a group of service roads related to the construction of a major highway, or a combination of both. However, these letter suffixes are only used for inventory purposes and are never signed, with the exception of MD 835A. Since most routes with suffixes are very short highways of low importance, these highways are rarely signed with route markers. However, there are several numbered highways with several disjoint segments whose segments are denoted internally with letter suffixes but the segments are signed with the same numerical route marker; examples of these highways include MD 7, MD 18, MD 144, MD 648, MD 675, and MD 765.

There is no duplication allowed between U.S. and Maryland state highways unless the two highways are related. The only signed examples of duplicate numbers are MD 222, which is the old alignment of US 222 before the latter was rolled back from Perryville to Conowingo, and MD 219, which is the old alignment of US 219 in Oakland. Duplication of number is allowed between Interstate and Maryland state highways. MD 795 is an unsigned short continuation of I-795. Also, MD 68 intersects I-70 in close proximity to I-68 that signs are posted on I-70 advising drivers of the difference between the roads.

This list of Maryland state highways contains all existing state highways—that is, all highways with Maryland route numbers—and all documented former state highways.

Number	Length (mi)	Length (km)	Southern or western terminus	Northern or eastern terminus	Formed	Removed	Notes
MD 2	79.24	127.52	Solomons	US 1 in Baltimore	1927	current	
MD 3	9.56	15.39	US 50 / US 301 in Bowie	I-97 in Millersville	1927	current	
MD 4	64.85	104.37	MD 5 in Leonardtown	Pennsylvania Avenue in Washington, D.C.	1927	current	
MD 5	74.34	119.64	Point Lookout	Branch Avenue in Washington, D.C.	1927	current	
MD 6	47.38	76.25	Riverside	MD 235 in Oraville	1927	current	
MD 7	22.83	36.74	US 40 in Rosedale	US 40 / MD 159 in Aberdeen	1938	current	Longest section
MD 8	8.37	13.47	Romancoke	MD 18 in Stevensville	1960	current	
MD 9	—	—	—	—	1978	1978	proposed renumbering of US 140 west of Reisterstown (now part of MD 140)
MD 10	7.17	11.54	MD 2 in Pasadena	I-695 in Glen Burnie	1972	current	
MD 12	30.57	49.20	VA 679 near Stockton	Main Street in Salisbury	1927	current	
MD 14	11.51	18.52	MD 16 in Secretary	MD 313 in Eldorado	1927	current	
MD 16	50.06	80.56	Taylors Island	DE 16 near Andersontown	1927	current	
MD 17	29.49	47.46	VA 287 in Brunswick	Wolfsville	1940	current	
MD 17	—	—	Claiborne	US 213 in Easton	1927	1940	
MD 18	20.47	32.94	Love Point	MD 213 in Centreville	1927	current	Contiguous sections
MD 19	8.60	13.84	MD 213 in Church Hill	MD 313 in Ingleside	1927	current	
MD 20	13.77	22.16	Rock Hall	MD 291 in Chestertown	1927	current	
MD 20	2.72	4.38	MD 151 in Dundalk	MD 150 in Dundalk	1927	1998	Longest section
MD 21	2.42	3.89	MD 445 near Tolchester Beach	MD 20 near Fairlee	1927	current	
MD 22	13.04	20.99	US 1 Business / MD 924 in Bel Air	Aberdeen Proving Ground	1927	current	
MD 23	20.46	32.93	US 1 in Hickory	PA 24 near Norrisville	1927	current	
MD 24	25.17	40.51	Aberdeen Proving Ground	PA QR 2055 in Fawn Grove, PA	1927	current	
MD 25	26.89	43.28	MD 2 in Baltimore	Beckleysville Road near Alesia	1927	current	
MD 26	44.10	70.97	US 15 in Frederick	MD 140 in Baltimore	1927	current	
MD 27	39.17	63.04	MD 355 in Germantown	MD 30 in Manchester	1934	current	
MD 27	—	—	Georgia Avenue in Washington, D.C.	US 40 in Ellicott City	1927	1934	
MD 28	37.38	60.16	US 15 in Point of Rocks	MD 182 in Norwood	1927	current	
MD 29	—	—	US 240 in Germantown	US 140 in Westminster	1927	1934	
MD 30	19.16	30.84	MD 140 in Reisterstown	PA 94 near Manchester	1927	current	
MD 31	16.95	27.28	MD 26 in Libertytown	MD 140 in Westminster	1927	current	
MD 32	51.79	83.35	I-97 in Millersville	Westminster	1927	current	
MD 33	23.17	37.29	Tilghman Island	Washington Street in Easton	1940	current	
MD 33	—	—	Brunswick	Wolfsville	1927	1940	
MD 34	9.95	16.01	WV 480 near Shepherdstown, WV	US 40 Alternate in Boonsboro	1927	current	
MD 35	2.37	3.81	MD 36 in Corriganville	PA 96 in Ellerslie	1927	current	
MD 36	29.43	47.36	WV 46 in Westernport	US 40 Alternate in La Vale	1927	current	
MD 37	—	—	West Virginia state line near Redhouse	US 40 at Keyser's Ridge	1927	1935	
MD 37	—	—	Garrison near the Gwynns Falls		1950	1998	
MD 38	5.67	9.12	WV 42 in Kitzmiller	MD 135 near Kitzmiller	1927	current	
MD 39	6.22	10.01	WV 7 in Hutton	US 219 in Oakland	1927	current	
MD 41	6.75	10.86	MD 147 in Baltimore	Waltham Woods Road in Carney	1962	current	
MD 41	—	—	US 219 in Oakland	MD 38 in Deer Park	1927	1956	
MD 42	15.06	24.24	US 219 near McHenry	PA QR 2013 in Asher Glade	1927	current	
MD 43	8.65	13.92	I-695 in Parkville	MD 150 in Middle River	1963	current	
MD 44	—	—	Fort Frederick State Park	MD 56 near Big Pool	1936	1969	
MD 45	30.02	48.31	US 1 in Baltimore	PA QR 3001 in Maryland Line	1957	current	
MD 45	—	—	dead end	US 40 Alternate northwest of Frostburg	1927	1956	
MD 46	—	—	MD 295 in Linthicum	BWI Airport	1950	1990	
MD 47	1.70	2.74	MD 36 in Barrelville	PA 160 near Barrelville	1927	current	
MD 48	—	—	US 220 near Dickens	Pennsylvania state line	1927	1950	
MD 49	2.69	4.33	MD 658 in La Vale	Greene Street in Cumberland	1927	current	
MD 51	25.53	41.09	I-68 / US 40 / US 220 in Cumberland	WV 9 near Paw Paw, WV	1927	current	
MD 52	—	—	MD 51 in Cumberland	Christie Road near Evitts Creek	1927	1956	
MD 53	3.33	5.36	US 220 in Cresaptown	US 40 Alternate in La Vale	1927	current	
MD 54	19.79	31.85	MD 313 in Mardela Springs	DE 54 / DE 26 / MD 353 near Gumboro, DE	1969	current	Length only includes the section of the Maryland and Delaware portions of Route 54 between the Maryland endpoints
MD 54	—	—	MD 17 in Myersville	Easterday Road near Myersville	1933	1956	
MD 55	2.53	4.07	MD 36 in Vale Summit	US 40 Alternate in Clarysville	1927	current	
MD 56	8.08	13.00	I-70 in Big Pool	MD 68 near Pinesburg	1927	current	
MD 57	4.02	6.47	US 40 near Clear Spring	MD 494 near Fairview	1927	current	
MD 58	3.53	5.68	MD 63 in Cearfoss	Hagerstown	1928	current	
MD 59	—	—	US 340 in Jefferson	US 40 Alternate in Middletown	1929	1956	
MD 60	3.53	5.68	Hagerstown	PA 316 near Leitersburg	1927	current	
MD 61	1.94	3.12	WV 28 in Cumberland	MD 51 in Cumberland	2001	current	
MD 61	—	—	Antietam Drive near Hagerstown	East of Hagerstown	1927	1956	
MD 62	3.88	6.24	MD 804 in Chewsville	MD 60 in Leitersburg	1927	current	
MD 63	16.99	27.34	MD 65 near Spielman	PA 163 near Cearfoss	1927	current	
MD 64	13.33	21.45	US 40 in Hagerstown	PA 997 near Ringgold	1927	current	
MD 65	11.75	18.91	MD 34 in Sharpsburg	Hagerstown	1927	current	
MD 66	12.84	20.66	US 40 Alternate in Boonsboro	MD 64 near Smithsburg	1927	current	
MD 67	12.20	19.63	US 340 in Weverton	US 40 Alternate in Boonsboro	1927	current	
MD 68	18.50	29.77	US 40 in Clear Spring	US 40 Alternate in Boonsboro	1927	current	
MD 69	—	—	Mount Zion Road near Braddock Heights	US 40 Alternate in Braddock Heights	1927	1956	
MD 70	2.32	3.73	MD 450 in Annapolis	Bestgate Road in Parole	1954	current	
MD 70	—	—	US 340 in Knoxville	Florida Avenue in Brunswick	1927	1950	
MD 71	—	—	MD 26 in Ceresville	PA 194 near Taneytown	1927	1956	
MD 71	—	—	US 50 in Queenstown	DE 71 near Warwick	1956	1959	
MD 72	—	—	US 15 in Lewistown	North of Creagerstown	1927	1956	
MD 73	—	—	Frederick	Yellow Springs	1927	1969	
MD 74	—	—	Frederick	Poole Jones Road near Frederick	1927	1956	
MD 75	28.40	45.71	MD 355 near Hyattstown	MD 31 in New Windsor	1927	current	
MD 76	5.69	9.16	MD 77 at Rocky Ridge	US 15 near Emmitsburg	1927	current	
MD 77	20.74	33.38	MD 64 in Smithsburg	MD 194 in Keymar	1927	current	
MD 78	—	—	Adamstown	US 340 near Frederick	1927	1970	
MD 79	0.85	1.37	MD 17 / MD 464 in Rosemont	Petersville Road in Rosemont	1927	current	
MD 80	14.79	23.80	MD 85 in Buckeystown	MD 27 near Damascus	1927	current	
MD 81	—	—	MD 806 in Thurmont	Fort Ritchie	1927	1977	
MD 82	—	—	MD 191 in Bethesda	MD 410 in Chevy Chase	1929	1997	
MD 83	—	—	MD 31 in New Windsor	one block south of MD 31 in New Windsor	1927	1956	
MD 84	5.75	9.25	MD 75 in New Windsor	MD 832 in Tyrone	1927	current	
MD 85	10.82	17.41	MD 28 in Tuscarora	Frederick	1970	current	
MD 85	—	—	Frederick–Carroll county line near Middleburg	Middleburg	1927	1956	
MD 86	4.00	6.44	MD 30 in Manchester	PA 516 in Lineboro	1927	current	
MD 87	—	—	Carrollton	MD 31 in Mexico	1927	1956	
MD 88	8.01	12.89	MD 30 Business in Hampstead	MD 25 near Butler	1927	current	
MD 89	—	—	MD 88 in Hampstead	Carroll–Baltimore county line near Hampstead	1927	1956	
MD 90	11.83	19.04	US 50 near Whaleyville	MD 528 in Ocean City	1972	current	
MD 90	—	—	Houcksville	MD 30 in Hampstead	1927	1956	
MD 91	7.86	12.65	MD 32 at Gamber	MD 30 near Upperco	1927	current	
MD 92	—	—	MD 64 in Smithsburg	East of Smithsburg	1934	1956	
MD 93	—	—	MD 26 at Shervettes Corner	Carroll–Baltimore county line near Shervettes Corner	1927	1956	
MD 94	6.25	10.06	Patuxent River near Damascus	Old Frederick Road near Lisbon	1927	current	
MD 95	—	—	West of Comus	MD 109 at Comus	1930	1999	
MD 96	—	—	Union Chapel Road near Glenwood	MD 144 near Lisbon	1927	1956	
MD 97	55.27	88.95	US 29 / MD 384 in Silver Spring	PA 97 near Littlestown, PA	1927	current	
MD 98	—	—	MD 32 in Glenelg	MD 144 near Ellicott City	1927	1956	
MD 99	7.57	12.18	MD 32 near West Friendship	US 29 in Ellicott City	1927	current	
MD 100	22.05	35.49	US 29 in Ellicott City	MD 177 in Jacobsville	1970	current	
MD 100	—	—	MD 99 near Ellicott City	Howard–Baltimore county line near Ellicott City	1927	1956	
MD 101	—	—	MD 99 near West Friendship	Howard–Carroll county line at Henryton	1927	1956	
MD 102	—	—	Ellicott City	MD 144 in Ellicott City	1927	1956	
MD 103	8.29	13.34	St. John's Lane in Ellicott City	Dorsey	1927	current	
MD 104	1.14	1.83	MD 108 near Columbia	MD 103 near Ellicott City	1979	current	
MD 104	—	—	MD 103 near Ellicott City	Howard–Baltimore county line at Ilchester	1927	1956	
MD 105	—	—	MD 144 in Ellicott City	MD 100 in Ellicott City	1927	1956	
MD 106	—	—	Glenelg	US 1 in Savage	1927	1946	
MD 107	4.79	7.71	MD 109 in Poolesville	MD 28 in Dawsonville	1927	current	
MD 108	34.23	55.09	MD 27 in Damascus	MD 175 in Columbia	1927	current	
MD 109	11.87	19.10	MD 107 in Poolesville	MD 355 in Hyattstown	1927	current	
MD 110	—	—	Old Annapolis Road near Mount Airy	Shirley Bohn Road near Mount Airy	1948	1949	
MD 112	2.81	4.52	MD 190 near Seneca	MD 28 in Darnestown	1927	current	
MD 114	1.16	1.87	MD 117 in Gaithersburg	MD 355 in Gaithersburg	2022	current	Unsigned
MD 114	—	—	MD 124 in Gaithersburg	Gaithersburg	1930	1974	
MD 115	5.83	9.38	MD 124 in Redland	MD 655 at Norbeck	1928	current	
MD 116	—	—	US 29 / MD 108 in Ashton	Brighton Dam Road near Brinklow	1928	1960	
MD 117	12.67	20.39	MD 28 in Dawsonville	MD 355 in Gaithersburg	1927	current	
MD 118	7.08	11.39	MD 28 in Darnestown	MD 355 in Germantown	1927	current	
MD 119	7.47	12.02	MD 28 in Rockville	Middlebrook Road in Germantown	1999	current	
MD 119	—	—	Near Germantown	MD 117 in Germantown	1927	1958	
MD 120	—	—	MD 118 in Germantown	Germantown	1930	1999	
MD 121	3.96	6.37	MD 117 in Boyds	Stringtown Road in Clarksburg	1927	current	section from MD 117 to MD 28 decommissioned 1999
MD 122	2.96	4.76	Rolling Road in Woodlawn	Cooks Lane in Baltimore	1991	current	
MD 122	—	—	Clarksburg Road near Damascus	MD 27 in Damascus	1927	1974	
MD 123	—	—	MD 75 near Hyattstown	MD 122 near Damascus	1927	1974	
MD 124	17.03	27.41	MD 28 in Gaithersburg	MD 108 in Damascus	1927	current	
MD 125	3.59	5.78	Howard–Baltimore county line near Woodstock	Just east of Dogwood Road in Randallstown	1927	current	
MD 126	—	—	Windsor Mill Road in Woodlawn	MD 26 in Baltimore	1927	1999	
MD 127	—	—	MD 140 in Reisterstown	Western Maryland Railway near Glyndon	1927	1987	
MD 128	7.62	12.26	MD 30 / MD 795 in Reisterstown	MD 25 in Butler	1930	current	
MD 129	15.43	24.83	US 40 in Baltimore	Garrison Forest Road near Reisterstown	1927	current	
MD 130	5.57	8.96	MD 140 in Garrison	MD 25 in Brooklandville	1927	current	
MD 131	3.06	4.92	MD 25 in Brooklandville	MD 45 in Lutherville	1927	current	
MD 132	2.15	3.46	Aberdeen	Norman Avenue in Aberdeen	—	—	Longest section
MD 132	—	—	MD 131 near Mays Chapel	Timonium Road near Mays Chapel	1930	1961	
MD 133	3.31	5.33	MD 129 in Pikesville	MD 25 near Brooklandville	1927	current	
MD 134	1.63	2.62	MD 139 near Towson	Ruxton Road near Towson	1928	current	
MD 135	29.00	46.67	US 219 in Oakland	US 220 in McCoole	—	—	
MD 136	30.04	48.34	MD 7 near Riverside	MD 23 in Norrisville	1927	current	
MD 137	8.50	13.68	Gunpowder Road near Hampstead	MD 45 in Hereford	1927	current	
MD 138	9.24	14.87	MD 45 in Hereford	MD 23 in Shawsville	1927	current	
MD 139	7.88	12.68	US 1 in Baltimore	I-695 in Lutherville	1927	current	
MD 140	49.72	80.02	US 1 in Baltimore	PA 16 near Emmitsburg	—	—	
MD 141	—	—	MD 139 in Towson	US 111 / MD 146 / MD 148 in Towson	1927	1961	
MD 142	—	—	Wiseburg Road in White Hall	MD 23 in Shawsville	1927	1981	
MD 143	—	—	MD 45 in Cockeysville	Just north of Bosley Road near Loch Raven Reservoir	1927	1983	
MD 144	17.55	28.24	MD 807 in Cumberland	US 40 Scenic near Flintstone	—	—	Longest section
MD 144	—	—	US 111 / MD 141 / MD 148 in Towson	Hampton Lane in Hampton	1927	1940	
MD 145	10.34	16.64	MD 45 in Cockeysville	MD 165 near Baldwin	1927	current	
MD 146	16.81	27.05	MD 45 in Towson	MD 23 near Jarrettsville	1928	current	
MD 147	18.82	30.29	US 1 in Baltimore	US 1 / US 1 Business near Bel Air	1927	current	
MD 148	—	—	US 111 / MD 146 / MD 141 in Towson	US 1 in Perry Hall	1927	1963	
MD 149	—	—	White Marsh	Chase	1927	1966	
MD 150	13.01	20.94	US 40 in Baltimore	Graces Quarter Road in Chase	1927	current	
MD 151	10.80	17.38	Sparrows Point	US 1 in Baltimore	1927	current	
MD 152	17.34	27.91	Aberdeen Proving Ground	MD 146 near Jarrettsville	1927	current	
MD 153	—	—	US 1 in Bel Air	MD 7 in Edgewood	1927	1940	
MD 153	—	—	I-70 in Myersville	Wolfsville	1956	1985	
MD 154	—	—	MD 22 near Churchville	Kalmia	1927	1955	
MD 155	9.12	14.68	MD 22 in Churchville	US 40 / MD 7 in Havre de Grace	1927	current	
MD 156	3.92	6.31	MD 22 near Churchville	MD 155 near Havre de Grace	1927	current	swapped with MD 155 in 1952
MD 157	4.79	7.71	MD 158 in Sparrows Point	I-695 in Dundalk	—	—	
MD 157	—	—	MD 462 near Aberdeen	Havre de Grace	1927	1956	
MD 158	2.35	3.78	Riverside Drive in Sparrows Point	North Point Road in Edgemere	—	—	
MD 158	—	—	US 40 in Belcamp	Creswell Road near Belcamp	1927	1956	
MD 159	4.73	7.61	Bush River	US 40 / MD 7 in Aberdeen	1928	current	
MD 160	—	—	MD 161 in Darlington	US 1 at Conowingo Dam	1930	1955	
MD 161	5.38	8.66	MD 155 near Havre de Grace	US 1 in Darlington	1927	current	
MD 162	2.31	3.72	MD 176 near Glen Burnie	MD 170 in Linthicum	—	—	
MD 162	—	—	US 1 near Darlington	Susquehanna River	1928	1956	
MD 163	—	—	MD 165 near Pylesville	Deer Creek	1933	1955	
MD 164	2.63	4.23	Carpenter Point	MD 267 in Charlestown	1933	1979	
MD 165	20.38	32.80	Just north of Long Green Pike in Baldwin	PA 74 in Cardiff	1927	current	
MD 166	2.71	4.36	I-195 in Arbutus	MD 144 in Catonsville	1927	current	
MD 167	—	—	MD 170 in Linthicum	Patapsco River	1929	1974	
MD 168	1.28	2.06	Hammonds Ferry Road in North Linthicum	MD 648 in Pumphrey	1929	current	
MD 169	0.97	1.56	Hammonds Ferry Road in Linthicum Heights	MD 648 in Linthicum	—	—	
MD 170	12.98	20.89	MD 175 in Odenton	MD 2 in Brooklyn Park	1927	current	
MD 171	1.54	2.48	MD 2 in Brooklyn Park	MD 173 in Baltimore	1927	current	
MD 172	0.17	0.27	U.S. Coast Guard Yard	MD 173 in Baltimore	1930	current	
MD 173	13.73	22.10	Fort Smallwood Park	MD 2 in Baltimore	1927	current	
MD 174	5.94	9.56	Fort Meade	MD 3 Business in Glen Burnie	1927	current	
MD 175	17.01	27.37	Little Patuxent Parkway in Columbia	MD 3 in Millersville	1927	current	
MD 176	5.68	9.14	Hanover	MD 648 in Glen Burnie	1929	current	
MD 177	10.92	17.57	MD 2 in Pasadena	Gibson Island	1927	current	
MD 178	8.06	12.97	MD 450 in Parole	Veterans Highway near Millersville	1927	current	
MD 179	3.16	5.09	MD 648 near Annapolis	Cape Saint Claire	1927	current	
MD 180	14.63	23.54	US 340 in Knoxville	I-70 in Frederick	—	—	
MD 180	—	—	Fort Meade	US 301 in Millersville	1930	1946	
MD 181	0.16	0.26	Spa Creek Bridge in Annapolis		1927	current	decommissioned in 1999 and recommissioned in 2009
MD 182	6.60	10.62	MD 97 in Glenmont	MD 108 near Sandy Spring	1927	current	
MD 183	—	—	MD 97 in Glenmont	MD 650 in Colesville	1927	1981	
MD 184	0.36	0.58	US 29 in Silver Spring	Blair Road in Washington, D.C.	1927	1999	
MD 185	8.32	13.39	Connecticut Avenue in Washington, D.C.	MD 97 in Aspen Hill	—	—	
MD 185	—	—	MD 184	MD 605	1927	1958	bridge over railroad that has nothing remaining
MD 186	1.52	2.45	Western Avenue in Washington, D.C.	MD 410 in Chevy Chase	1927	current	
MD 187	5.04	8.11	MD 355 / MD 410 in Bethesda	Executive Boulevard in North Bethesda	1927	current	
MD 188	3.25	5.23	MacArthur Boulevard in Glen Echo	MD 187 in Bethesda	1927	current	
MD 189	5.05	8.13	MD 190 in Potomac	Maryland Avenue in Rockville	1927	current	
MD 190	15.88	25.56	MD 112 in Seneca	River Road in Washington, D.C.	1927	current	
MD 191	7.16	11.52	MD 190 in Potomac	MD 185 in Chevy Chase	1927	current	section from MD 190 to Macarthur Blvd decommissioned 1999
MD 192	2.82	4.54	Summit Avenue in Kensington	MD 97 in Forest Glen	1927	current	
MD 193	26.07	41.96	MD 185 in Kensington	MD 202 near Upper Marlboro	1927	current	
MD 194	22.40	36.05	MD 26 in Ceresville	PA 194 near Taneytown	1956	current	
MD 194	—	—	MD 195 in Takoma Park	MD 516 in Silver Spring	1927	1956	
MD 195	1.90	3.06	Carroll Avenue in Washington, D.C.	MD 193 in Takoma Park	1930	current	
MD 196	—	—	US 29 in White Oak	MD 198 in Burtonsville	1930	1999	
MD 197	14.64	23.56	US 301 in Bowie	MD 198 in Laurel	1927	current	
MD 198	14.14	22.76	MD 650 near Spencerville	Fort Meade	1927	current	
MD 199	—	—	US 50 near Glenn Dale	Washington, Baltimore and Annapolis Electric Railway	1927	1956	
MD 200	17.47	28.12	I-370 in Derwood	US 1 near Beltsville	2011	current	
MD 200	—	—	MD 4 in Coral Hills	MD 214 in Capitol Heights	1927	1955	
MD 201	9.40	15.13	DC 295 near Bladensburg	MD 212 in Beltsville	1927	current	
MD 202	13.92	22.40	MD 450 in Bladensburg	MD 725 near Upper Marlboro	1927	current	
MD 203	—	—	US 1 in College Park	Baltimore & Ohio Railroad	1927	1957	
MD 204	—	—	Takoma Park	MD 212 in Chillum	1928	1955	
MD 205	—	—	US 50 in Bladensburg	MD 430 in Greenbelt	1927	1956	
MD 205	—	—	MD 5 in Waldorf	US 301 / MD 5 in Waldorf	1989	1997	
MD 206	3.17	5.10	MD 212 near Beltsville	Old Gunpowder Road in West Laurel	2014	current	
MD 206	—	—	US 1 Alternate in Cottage City	US 1 in Brentwood	1927	1970	
MD 207	—	—	MD 208 in Cottage City	Bunker Hill Rd. in Cottage City	1927	1970	2 roads on each side of the Amtrak train tracks.
MD 208	1.86	2.99	US 1 Alternate in Cottage City	MD 500 in Hyattsville	1927	current	
MD 209	—	—	MD 212 in Chillum	Hyattsville	1927	1946	
MD 210	20.86	33.57	Indian Head Naval Surface Weapons Center	South Capitol Street in Washington, D.C.	1955	current	
MD 210	—	—	Queens Chapel Road in Washington, D.C.	MD 209 in Hyattsville	1927	1946	
MD 211	—	—	Sargent Road in Washington, D.C.	MD 212 in Chillum	1927	1997	
MD 212	10.43	16.79	Riggs Road in Washington, D.C.	MD 201 in Beltsville	1927	current	
MD 213	68.25	109.84	MD 662 in Wye Mills	PA 841 near Fair Hill	—	—	
MD 214	24.97	40.19	East Capitol Street in Washington, D.C.	Beverly Beach	1927	current	
MD 215	—	—	MD 103 near Elkridge	US 1 in Elkridge	1927	1956	
MD 216	9.06	14.58	MD 108 in Highland	MD 198 in Laurel	1927	current	
MD 217	—	—	MD 103 near Elkridge	Ilchester	1927	1956	
MD 218	1.14	1.83	Suitland Road in Washington, D.C.	MD 458 in Suitland	1927	current	
MD 219	0.22	0.35	Section of future course of US 219 in Oakland		—	—	
MD 221	0.59	0.95	Section of Ritchie–Marlboro Road through its interchange with I-95 / I-495 near Largo		—	—	
MD 221	—	—	MD 214 near Largo	MD 4 near Upper Marlboro	1927	1955	
MD 222	11.36	18.28	MD 7 in Perryville	US 1 near Conowingo	1972	current	
MD 223	12.65	20.36	Piscataway	Melwood	1927	current	
MD 224	26.70	42.97	MD 6 at Riverside	MD 227 at Pomonkey	1927	current	Section along MD 227 to MD 210 deleted 1956; section along MD 210 and Livingston Road deleted 1955
MD 225	10.59	17.04	MD 210 in Potomac Heights	US 301 in La Plata	1927	current	
MD 226	—	—	MD 224 at Bryans Road	Marshall Hall	1927	1956	
MD 227	13.96	22.47	Marshall Hall	US 301 in White Plains	1927	current	
MD 228	6.86	11.04	MD 210 in Accokeek	US 301 / MD 5 Business in Waldorf	1927	current	
MD 229	5.25	8.45	MD 227 near Bennsville	MD 228 near Bennsville	1995	current	
MD 229	—	—	Morgantown	MD 3 at Wayside	1927	1956	
MD 230	—	—	MD 3 at Newburg	Mount Victoria	1927	1956	
MD 231	16.39	26.38	Olivers Shop Road near Bryantown	MD 765 in Prince Frederick	1927	current	
MD 232	—	—	MD 234 at Wicomico	MD 382 near Waldorf	1927	1989	
MD 233	—	—	MD 5 near Waldorf	Charles–Prince George's county line near Aquasco	1927	1956	
MD 234	19.02	30.61	US 301 near Newburg	MD 5 in Leonardtown	1927	current	
MD 235	30.63	49.29	MD 5 in Ridge	MD 5 in Oraville	1927	current	Longest state highway within a single county
MD 236	6.19	9.96	MD 234 near Budds Creek	MD 5 in Charlotte Hall	1930	current	
MD 237	2.95	4.75	MD 246 in Lexington Park	MD 235 in California	1987	current	
MD 237	—	—	MD 234 / MD 238 at Chaptico	MD 5 near Leonardtown	1927	1961	
MD 238	10.83	17.43	MD 242 near Bushwood	MD 5 near Morganza	1927	current	
MD 239	1.64	2.64	Bushwood	MD 242 near Bushwood	1927	current	
MD 241	—	—	MD 242 / MD 470 at Avenue	Abell	1928	1956	
MD 242	12.80	20.60	Coltons Point	MD 5 at Morganza	1927	current	
MD 243	4.62	7.44	Compton	MD 5 in Leonardtown	1927	current	
MD 244	10.48	16.87	MD 5 near Leonardtown	MD 249 in Valley Lee	1927	current	
MD 245	7.55	12.15	MD 5 in Leonardtown	Sotterley	1927	current	
MD 246	3.35	5.39	MD 5 in Great Mills	Naval Air Station Patuxent River	1927	current	
MD 247	2.89	4.65	MD 5 near Loveville	Oakville Road in Oakville	1942	current	
MD 247	2.89	4.65	MD 246 in Lexington Park	near Hermanville	1927	1933	
MD 248	—	—	MD 246 near Jarboesville	Cedar Point	1927	1943	
MD 249	9.84	15.84	St. George Island	MD 5 at Callaway	1927	current	
MD 250	—	—	West of Valley Lee	MD 249 at Valley Lee	1927	1946	
MD 250	0.19	0.31	US 13 Business in Pocomoke City	US 13 / US 113 in Pocomoke City	1946	current	
MD 251	—	—	MD 249 at Valley Lee	Drayden	1928	1946	
MD 251	—	—	MD 430 at Berwyn Heights	MD 434 at Berwyn Heights	1946	1977	
MD 252	—	—	Millers Wharf Road	MD 5 at Ridge	1927	1983	
MD 253	1.34	2.16	MD 214 in Edgewater	MD 2 in Edgewater	1927	current	
MD 254	—	—	MD 424 in Davidsonville	MD 2 in Edgewater	1927	1939	
MD 254	1.25	2.01	Cobb Island	MD 257 near Rock Point	1958	current	
MD 255	4.21	6.78	MD 2 near Owensville	Galesville	1927	current	
MD 256	5.28	8.50	MD 2 in Tracys Landing	MD 468 in Shady Side	1927	current	
MD 257	—	—	MD 2 in Tracys Landing	Deale	1927	1939	
MD 257	9.75	15.69	MD 254 near Rock Point	US 301 in Newburg	1957	current	
MD 258	7.13	11.47	MD 4 in Bristol	MD 256 in Deale	1928	current	
MD 259	2.67	4.30	MD 794 in Bristol	MD 408 near Lothian	1928	current	
MD 260	8.68	13.97	MD 4 at Lyons Creek	MD 261 in Chesapeake Beach	1927	current	
MD 261	12.86	20.70	MD 263 near Parran	MD 778 in Friendship	1930	current	
MD 262	4.47	7.19	Lower Marlboro	MD 4 in Sunderland	1927	current	
MD 263	6.17	9.93	MD 2 / MD 4 near Huntingtown	Plum Point	1927	current	
MD 264	6.66	10.72	Broomes Island	MD 2 / MD 4 near Port Republic	1927	current	
MD 265	1.75	2.82	Wallville	MD 264 at Mutual	1929	current	
MD 266	—	—	Sollers	MD 2 in Lusby	1928	1957	
MD 267	1.90	3.06	MD 7 near Charlestown	MD 7 in Charlestown	1927	current	
MD 268	11.68	18.80	US 40 in Perryville	US 1 at Conowingo	1927	1938	
MD 268	0.95	1.53	Main Street in Elkton	MD 279 in Elkton	1968	current	
MD 269	6.40	10.30	US 222 in Port Deposit	MD 276 near Colora	1927	1984	
MD 270	2.16	3.48	MD 648 in Glen Burnie	MD 3 Business in Glen Burnie	1932	current	
MD 271	0.33	0.53	North from MD 7 in Perryville		1930	1968	
MD 272	20.67	33.27	Elk Neck State Park	PA 272 near Calvert	1927	current	
MD 273	16.74	26.94	US 1 near Harrisville	DE 273 near Newark, DE	1927	current	
MD 274	7.35	11.83	MD 273 in Rising Sun	MD 272 at Bay View	1927	current	
MD 275	—	—	MD 213 in Kingstown	dead end in Kingstown	1927	1946	
MD 275	2.22	3.57	MD 222 / MD 824 in Perryville	MD 276 near Port Deposit	1967	current	
MD 276	7.85	12.63	MD 222 in Port Deposit	US 1 near Harrisville	1927	current	
MD 277	2.51	4.04	Elk Mills	MD 279 near Elkton	1927	current	
MD 278	0.21	0.34	Delaware state line in northeastern Cecil County	Pennsylvania state line in northeastern Cecil County	1927	1946	
MD 279	4.95	7.97	US 40 / MD 7 near Elkton	DE 279 near Elkton	1927	current	
MD 280	9.40	15.13	US 40 / US 213 in Elkton	PA 841 near Fair Hill	1927	1971	
MD 281	2.12	3.41	MD 7 in Elkton	Old Baltimore Pike at the Delaware state line near Elkton	1933	current	
MD 282	12.43	20.00	White Crystal Beach	DE 299 near Warwick	1927	current	
MD 283	4.46	7.18	Crystal Beach	MD 282 in Earleville	1928	1958	
MD 284	0.25	0.40	Hemphill Street between intersections with MD 285 in Chesapeake City		1927	current	
MD 285	2.43	3.91	MD 213 near Chesapeake City	Chesapeake City Road at Delaware state line near Chesapeake City	1930	current	
MD 286	2.09	3.36	MD 537 in Chesapeake City	DE 286 near Chesapeake City	1930	current	
MD 287	2.88	4.63	MD 313 in Goldsboro	DE 10 near Sandtown, DE	1933	current	
MD 288	3.33	5.36	MD 20 in Rock Hall	Crosby	1927	current	
MD 289	8.83	14.21	Cliffs City	MD 213 in Chestertown	1927	current	
MD 290	17.20	27.68	MD 300 near Sudlersville	MD 299 in Sassafras	1927	current	
MD 291	18.34	29.52	MD 20 in Chestertown	DE 6 near Millington	1930	current	
MD 292	4.61	7.42	MD 298 in Still Pond	Betterton	1927	current	
MD 293	—	—	Ericsson Avenue in Betterton		1930	1988	Longest section
MD 294	—	—	Wheeler Avenue in Betterton		1930	1948	
MD 295	—	—	Howell Point Road in Betterton		1930	1948	
MD 295	32.52	52.34	US 50 near Cheverly	US 40 in Baltimore	—	—	
MD 296	—	—	First Avenue in Betterton		1930	1948	
MD 297	3.59	5.78	MD 213 near Chestertown	MD 298 in Worton	1927	current	
MD 298	20.14	32.41	MD 20 in Fairlee	MD 291 near Chesterville	1930	current	
MD 299	5.67	9.12	MD 313 / MD 330 at Massey	US 301 near Warwick	1929	current	
MD 300	13.55	21.81	MD 213 in Church Hill	DE 300 near Sudlersville	1927	current	Contiguous sections
MD 301	—	—	MD 300 at Dudley Corners	Crumpton	1927	1940	
MD 302	10.21	16.43	US 301 near Barclay	DE 11 near Templeville	1927	current	
MD 303	—	—	US 213 south of Centreville	Queen Anne	1927	1955	
MD 303	4.20	6.76	MD 309 in Cordova	MD 404 in Queen Anne	1961	current	
MD 304	15.23	24.51	Corsica Neck Road west of Centreville	MD 312 in Bridgetown	1927	current	
MD 305	5.08	8.18	MD 213 in Centreville	Hope	1927	current	
MD 306	4.13	6.65	Federalsburg	Delaware state line near Federalsburg	1927	current	
MD 307	6.05	9.74	MD 331 in Hurlock	Federalsburg	1927	current	
MD 308	0.12	0.19	MD 313 / MD 318 in Federalsburg	Federalsburg	1927	current	
MD 309	18.50	29.77	US 50 in Easton	MD 213 near Centreville	1927	current	
MD 310	3.96	6.37	MD 213 near Chesapeake City	Churchtown Road at Delaware state line near Chesapeake City	1927	current	
MD 311	6.11	9.83	MD 313 in Goldsboro	MD 454 in Marydel	1927	current	
MD 312	11.41	18.36	MD 404 near Ridgely	MD 313 at Baltimore Corner	1927	current	
MD 313	75.72	121.86	US 50 in Mardela Springs	MD 213 / MD 290 in Galena	1927	current	Contiguous sections
MD 314	4.93	7.93	Greensboro	DE 12 in Whiteleysburg	1927	current	
MD 315	—	—	Sunset Avenue in Greensboro	MD 313 / MD 480 in Greensboro	1927	1950	
MD 315	3.13	5.04	MD 313 / MD 318 in Federalsburg	MD 318 near Federalsburg	1964	current	
MD 316	2.67	4.30	MD 279 in Elkton	MD 277 near Elk Mills	1927	current	
MD 317	4.78	7.69	MD 313 near Denton	DE 14 in Burrsville	1927	current	
MD 318	11.32	18.22	MD 16 / MD 331 near Preston	DE 18 near Federalsburg	1927	current	
MD 319	—	—	MD 16 / MD 331 near Preston	Federalsburg	1928	1956	
MD 320	2.84	4.57	Piney Branch Road in Washington, D.C.	MD 650 in Adelphi	1927	current	
MD 321	—	—	Old Washington Rd (then MD 477) in Elkridge	US 1 in Elkridge	1931	1954	
MD 322	—	—	Brumbaugh St in Elkridge	Railroad in Elkridge	1931	1946	
MD 322	—	—	MD 313 near Federalsburg	MD 16 / MD 404 at Andersontown	1952	1954	
MD 322	5.12	8.24	US 50 south of Easton	US 50 in Easton	—	—	
MD 323	—	—	Railroad in Elkridge	Railroad Ave in Elkridge	1931	1946	
MD 324	0.40	0.64	Preston	MD 16 / MD 331 in Preston	1927	current	
MD 325	—	—	Spring Grove State Hospital	MD 144 in Catonsville	1930	1978	
MD 326	—	—	Leonardtown Wharf	MD 5 in Leonardtown	1933	1985	
MD 327	—	—	MD 6 near Port Tobacco	US 301 near La Plata	1930	1956	
MD 327	0.51	0.82	MD 7 in Perryville	Perryville	1968	current	
MD 328	15.24	24.53	US 50 in Easton	West Denton	1927	current	
MD 329	3.29	5.29	MD 33 west of Royal Oak	MD 33 east of Royal Oak	1927	current	
MD 330	—	—	US 1 in Kingsville	Bradshaw Road in Kingsville	1927	1985	
MD 330	3.72	5.99	MD 299 / MD 313 at Massey	Clayton Road at Delaware state line near Massey	1988	current	
MD 331	28.74	46.25	US 50 in Vienna	US 50 in Easton	—	—	
MD 331	—	—	MD 16 in Cambridge	US 213 in Easton	1927	1939	
MD 332	1.07	1.72	Central Avenue in Washington, D.C.	MD 214 in Seat Pleasant	—	—	
MD 332	—	—	MD 565 in Easton	MD 331 in Easton	1927	1961	
MD 333	9.79	15.76	Oxford	Washington Street in Easton	1927	current	
MD 334	0.61	0.98	MD 322 in Easton	Washington Street in Easton	1927	current	
MD 335	16.36	26.33	Hooper's Island	MD 16 in Church Creek	1927	current	
MD 336	4.87	7.84	MD 335 at Crossroads	Lakesville	1927	current	
MD 337	3.41	5.49	MD 5 in Camp Springs	MD 4 in Meadows	1927	current	
MD 338	1.24	2.00	Octoraro Creek	US 1 / US 222 at Conowingo	1927	1979	
MD 339	—	—	MD 331 in Rhodesdale	MD 331 in Rhodesdale	1927	1954	
MD 339	—	—	US 29 in Silver Spring	MD 320 in Silver Spring	1955	1999	
MD 341	1.25	2.01	MD 16 near Cambridge	MD 343 in Cambridge	—	—	
MD 341	—	—	MD 14 near Brookview	MD 14 near Brookview	1927	1965	
MD 342	—	—	MD 16 near Secretary	MD 14 in Secretary	1927	1939	Became part of MD 14
MD 342	2.82	4.54	MD 310 at St. Augustine	MD 537 in Chesapeake City	1941	current	
MD 343	11.29	18.17	Hudson	US 50 in Cambridge	1927	current	
MD 344	—	—	MD 16 at Mount Holly	US 213 in Vienna	1927	1939	
MD 344	2.16	3.48	MD 6 in Doncaster	MD 224 near Chicamuxen	1957	current	
MD 345	—	—	Backbone Mountain	US 50 near Redhouse	1940	1954	
MD 346	23.72	38.17	US 50 Business in Salisbury	US 50 near Berlin	—	—	
MD 347	6.92	11.14	MD 349 in Quantico	US 50 in Hebron	1927	current	
MD 348	1.39	2.24	Sharptown	DE 24 near Sharptown	1930	current	
MD 349	22.32	35.92	Nanticoke	US 50 Business in Salisbury	1927	current	
MD 350	11.80	18.99	Main Street in Salisbury	MD 354 in Powellville	1927	current	
MD 351	—	—	Little Brown Road	MD 663 in Fruitland	1927	1956	
MD 351	4.24	6.82	Church Hill	MD 180 in Frederick	1987	2002	
MD 351	4.24	6.82	Church Hill	MD 180 in Frederick	2003	2014	
MD 352	10.03	16.14	MD 349 at Coxs Corner	MD 349 near Catchpenny	1933	current	
MD 353	5.08	8.18	US 50 in Pittsville	MD 54 / DE 54 / DE 26 at the Delaware state line near Gumboro, DE	1927	current	
MD 354	14.98	24.11	MD 12 near Snow Hill	US 50 in Willards	1927	current	
MD 355	36.94	59.45	Wisconsin Avenue in Washington, D.C.	Frederick	1954	current	
MD 355	0.1	0.16	MD 413 in Crisfield		1927	1954	
MD 356	—	—	MD 413 near Kingston	MD 667 in Kingston	1927	1961	
MD 357	—	—	Tulls Corner Road near Marion Station	Charles Cannon Road near Marion Station	1927	1991	
MD 358	1.13	1.82	MD 413 in Crisfield	Near Crisfield	1927	current	Originally MD 475; formerly continued south and east to MD 380
MD 359	—	—	Boone Road	MD 380 near Crisfield	1927	1960	
MD 359	1.09	1.75	Pocomoke City	MD 756 near Pocomoke City	1974	current	
MD 360	—	—	Sackertown Road	MD 358 near Crisfield	1927	1960	
MD 361	5.62	9.04	Fairmount	MD 413 in Westover	1927	current	
MD 362	6.23	10.03	Mount Vernon	MD 675 in Princess Anne	1929	current	
MD 363	18.30	29.45	Deal Island	Mansion Avenue in Princess Anne	1927	current	
MD 364	5.43	8.74	US 13 / US 13 Business in West Pocomoke	Pocomoke State Forest	1927	current	
MD 365	6.29	10.12	US 113 Business in Snow Hill	Public Landing	1927	current	
MD 366	11.17	17.98	US 13 Business in Pocomoke City	George Island Landing	1927	current	
MD 367	2.60	4.18	Bishop	Hudson Road at Delaware state line near Bishopville	1927	current	
MD 368	0.28	0.45	MD 367 in Bishopville	Bishopville	1927	current	
MD 369	—	—	US 113 in Basket Switch	Railroad Crossing	1927	1956	
MD 370	1.58	2.54	MD 33 near Easton	Unionville	1933	current	
MD 371	4.27	6.87	Cedar Hall	Pocomoke City	1930	current	
MD 372	2.86	4.60	MD 166 in Arbutus	US 1 in Baltimore	1927	current	
MD 373	8.16	13.13	MD 210 in Accokeek	Brandywine Road near Brandywine	1927	current	
MD 374	9.98	16.06	MD 354 in Powellville	MD 818 in Berlin	1927	current	
MD 375	0.06	0.097	MD 818 in Berlin	MD 374 in Berlin	1927	current	
MD 376	4.56	7.34	MD 818 in Berlin	MD 611 near Sinepuxent	1927	current	
MD 377	0.78	1.26	MD 376 in Berlin	MD 346 in Berlin	1927	current	
MD 378	1.49	2.40	MD 528 in Ocean City	MD 528 in Ocean City	1927	current	
MD 379	—	—	MD 5 in Leonardtown	End of pavement	1939	1978	
MD 380	1.56	2.51	Lawsonia	Crisfield	1934	current	
MD 381	15.91	25.60	MD 231 in Patuxent	US 301 in Brandywine	1927	current	
MD 382	15.34	24.69	Poplar Hill	US 301 in Marlton	1927	current	
MD 383	5.48	8.82	MD 180 near Jefferson	MD 17 near Middletown	1930	current	
MD 384	0.53	0.85	MD 390 in Silver Spring	US 29 / MD 97 in Silver Spring	1929	current	
MD 385	—	—	Marshyhope Creek	Delaware state line	1927	1946	
MD 385	—	—	MD 352 north of Whitehaven	MD 349	1948	1964	
MD 386	—	—	Truck House Road	MD 648 in Severna Park	1930	1973	
MD 387	1.68	2.70	Ferry Point Road near Annapolis	MD 435 / MD 450 in Annapolis	1930	current	
MD 388	2.38	3.83	MD 675 in Princess Anne	East of Princess Anne	1930	current	
MD 389	—	—	MD 214	MD 704 in Seat Pleasant	1930	1955	
MD 390	1.09	1.75	16th Street in Washington, D.C.	MD 97 in Silver Spring	1930	current	
MD 391	—	—	MD 192 in Forest Glen	MD 320 in Silver Spring	1930	1999	
MD 392	13.54	21.79	MD 16 in East New Market	DE 20 in Reliance	1930	current	
MD 393	—	—	MD 468	Galesville	1930	1949	
MD 393	0.63	1.01	MD 2 in Parole	MD 450 in Annapolis	1953	current	
MD 394	—	—	West of Templeville	East of Templeville	1930	1939	Became part of MD 302
MD 394	—	—	US 219 at Gortner	Loch Lynn Heights	1940	1954	
MD 394	—	—	US 113 at Snow Hill	US 113	1977	1997	
MD 395	—	—	US 220 at Snow Hill	US 40	1927	1983	
MD 396	2.21	3.56	MD 614 in Bethesda	Massachusetts Avenue in Washington, D.C.	1931	current	
MD 397	—	—	Indian Bone Road in Airey	US 50/MD 16 in Mount Holly	1930	1973	
MD 398	—	—	US 11 in Williamsport	MD 58 in Cearfoss	1930	1957	
MD 399	—	—	MD 108 in Damascus	near Long Corner Road	1930	1974	
MD 400	—	—	MD 140	Mount Wilson Hospital Center near Garrison	1930	1989	
MD 401	—	—	MD 25	Yeoho Road near Butler	1930	1985	
MD 402	4.33	6.97	MD 2 / MD 4 in Prince Frederick	Dares Beach	1930	current	
MD 403	—	—	MD 155	MD 155	1930	1942	
MD 403	—	—	MD 500 in Hyattsville	US 1 in Riverdale	1942	1956	
MD 404	24.61	39.61	MD 662 in Wye Mills	DE 404 near Andersontown	1930	current	
MD 405	8.59	13.82	MD 304 near Ruthsburg	MD 19 near Church Hill	1930	current	
MD 406	—	—	MD 667 in Hudson Corner	US 13 in West Pocomoke	1930	1961	
MD 407	3.81	6.13	MD 31 near Marston	MD 27 near Taylorsville	1930	current	
MD 408	—	—	Aberdeen Proving Ground (then the Edgewood Arsenal)	MD 7 in Edgewood	1930	1952	
MD 408	5.62	9.04	MD 4 at Waysons Corner	MD 2 / MD 422 in Lothian	1965	current	
MD 409	—	—	Northern Central Railway at Freeland	Interstate 83 at Maryland Line	1930	1991	
MD 410	13.92	22.40	MD 187 / MD 355 in Bethesda	Pennsy Drive near Glenarden	1930	current	
MD 411	—	—	MD 206 (now MD 208) in Brentwood	US 1 in Hyattsville	1930	1946	
MD 412	—	—	US 1 in Riverdale	MD 201 in Riverdale	1930	1991	two sections; western section removed in 1978
MD 413	14.61	23.51	Crisfield	US 13 near Westover	1930	current	
MD 414	5.11	8.22	Oxon Hill	MD 5 in Silver Hill	1930	current	
MD 415	—	—	MD 5	Chesapeake Bay shore near Scotland	1930	1956	
MD 416	—	—	MD 4 at Waysons Corner	Solomons	1930	1965	
MD 417	—	—	US 40 (now US 40 Alternate)	Pennsylvania State Line at Grantsville	1930	1963	
MD 418	4.62	7.44	MD 60 in Leitersburg	PA QR 2007 near Ringgold	1930	current	
MD 419	—	—	Martinsburg Road curve near Potomac River in Dickerson	Mt. Ephraim Road and Sugarloaf Mountain Road in Dickerson	1930	1959	was concurrent with MD 28 from Martinsburg Road to Mt. Ephraim Road
MD 420	—	—	Goshen Road in Goshen	Sundown Road east of Laytonsville	1930	1973	section from Goshen Road to MD 124 removed 1959
MD 421	—	—	MD 190 near Travilah	Glen Road near Travilah	1930	1959	
MD 422	3.04	4.89	Bayard	MD 2 / MD 408 in Lothian	—	—	
MD 423	2.79	4.49	MD 2 near Tracys Landing	Fairhaven	—	—	
MD 424	8.24	13.26	MD 214 in Davidsonville	MD 3 in Crofton	—	—	
MD 425	11.77	18.94	MD 6 near Nanjemoy	MD 224 near Mason Springs	—	—	
MD 426	—	—	Potomac River	MD 6 in Travilah	1930	1956	
MD 427	—	—	Port Tobacco River	US 301 in Bel Alton	1930	1989	
MD 428	—	—	MD 6 in Dentsville	MD 234 in Newport	1930	1956	
MD 429	—	—	Popes Creek	US 301 in Faulkner	1930	1956	
MD 430	0.49	0.79	US 1 in College Park	MD 193 in College Park	—	—	
MD 431	—	—	MD 244 (now Drayden Road) in Drayden	End of state maintenance	1930	1956	
MD 431	2.06	3.32	MD 201 in Riverdale Park	US 1 in College Park	2019	current	
MD 432	—	—	Stringtown Road	MD 27 near Clarksburg	1930	1956	
MD 432	0.25	0.40	Spur from Guilford Road in Columbia		1971	current	
MD 433	—	—	Powder Mill Road west of US 1 in Beltsville	Powder Mill Road east of US 1 in Beltsville	1930	1946	Became part of an extended MD 212
MD 433	—	—	Near Smithville	Old Denton Road north of Federalsburg	1948	1958	
MD 433	1.29	2.08	MD 410 in New Carrollton	MD 450 in New Carrollton	2019	current	
MD 434	—	—	US 1 in College Park	MD 201 in Berwyn Heights	1930	1991	Two sections; western section removed 1962
MD 435	1.16	1.87	MD 387 / MD 450 in Annapolis	MD 450 in Annapolis	1930	current	
MD 436	1.14	1.83	MD 435 in Annapolis	Bestgate Road in Parole	1930	current	
MD 437	—	—	MD 435 in Annapolis	MD 436 (now Melvin Avenue) in Annapolis	1930	1975	Became part of relocated MD 436
MD 438	—	—	MD 436 (now Annapolis Street) in Annapolis	Wardour Drive in Annapolis	1930	1975	
MD 439	7.19	11.57	MD 45 near Maryland Line	MD 23 in Shawsville	1930	current	
MD 440	5.65	9.09	MD 543 at Ady	US 1 near Dublin	1930	current	
MD 441	0.50	0.80	Little Elk Creek near Fair Hill	MD 280 near Fair Hill	1938	1958	
MD 442	0.36	0.58	MD 292 near Betterton	Rosedale Cannery Road near Betterton	1930	1987	
MD 443	0.88	1.42	Clark Road near Betterton	MD 292 near Betterton	1930	1987	
MD 444	7.29	11.73	MD 290 in Chesterville	Kentmore Park	1930	current	
MD 445	11.96	19.25	Eastern Neck National Wildlife Refuge	MD 21 in Tolchester Beach	1930	current	
MD 446	6.03	9.70	Broad Neck	MD 20 near Chestertown	1930	current	
MD 447	10.35	16.66	US 213 in Chestertown	MD 290 in Chesterville	1930	1963	
MD 447	0.84	1.35	MD 213 near Locust Grove	MD 444 near Locust Grove	1969	1987	
MD 448	5.94	9.56	Morgnec Road near Kennedyville	Turners Creek near the Sassafras River	1930	1987	
MD 449	0.07	0.11	MD 213 near Locust Grove	MD 444 near Locust Grove	1969	current	
MD 449	0.53	0.85	Two sections of old US 222 in Perryville		1934	1958	
MD 450	0.53	0.85	MD 404 near Andersontown	Delaware state line	1930	1939	Became part of MD 16
MD 450	30.42	48.96	US 1 Alternate in Bladensburg	US 50 / US 301 / MD 2 near Annapolis	1954	current	
MD 451	—	—	Claiborne	MD 33	1930	1998	
MD 452	1.64	2.64	US 50 near Berlin	MD 575 in Friendship	1930	current	
MD 453	—	—	MD 144	Woodmont	1933	1956	
MD 454	2.21	3.56	DE 8 in Marydel	MD 302 in Templeville	1933	current	
MD 455	—	—	Waller Road	MD 353	1939	1968	
MD 456	1.22	1.96	US 50 near Queenstown	MD 18 in Queenstown	1933	current	Contiguous sections
MD 457	—	—	Tuckahoe Creek	MD 404 in Denton	1933	1946	
MD 457	—	—	MD 313	MD 317 in Burrsville	1950	1958	
MD 458	3.12	5.02	MD 5 in Hillcrest Heights	Walker Mill Road in District Heights	1933	current	
MD 459	1.25	2.01	US 50 in Cheverly	MD 201 near Cheverly	1933	current	
MD 460	0.78	1.26	Crisfield	MD 413 in Crisfield	1933	current	
MD 461	—	—	US 1 near Bel Air		1933	1950	
MD 462	4.15	6.68	MD 132 in Aberdeen	MD 155 near Havre de Grace	1933	current	
MD 463	—	—	MD 45 in Parkton		1933	1998	
MD 464	8.10	13.04	MD 17 / MD 79 in Rosemont	Ballenger Creek Pike in Point of Rocks	1933	current	
MD 465	—	—	MD 178 in Crownsville	River Road	1933	1968	
MD 466	—	—	Francis Avenue in Relay	US 1 in Relay	1972	1978	
MD 467	—	—	MD 313 in Mardela Springs	Delaware state line	1941	1968	
MD 468	11.19	18.01	Shady Side	MD 214 in Edgewater	1933	current	
MD 469	—	—	MD 6 in Port Tobacco	Purcell Road	1933	1956	
MD 470	3.75	6.04	MD 242 at Avenue	MD 242 at Dynard	1933	current	
MD 471	0.99	1.59	MD 5 in Great Mills	Great Mills	1933	current	Until 1956, had another section from MD 5 in Leonardtown to Fairgrounds Road
MD 472	2.58	4.15	MD 235 in Oakville	Sandgates	1933	current	
MD 473	1.25	2.01	MD 273 near Fair Hill	Blake Road near Fair Hill	1933	1958	
MD 474	—	—	Maryland, Delaware & Virginia Railroad east of Denton	Maryland, Delaware & Virginia Railroad southeast of Denton	1933	1958	
MD 475	—	—	MD 413 in Crisfield	Near Crisfield	1933	1946	
MD 475	—	—	US 50 in Salisbury	US 13 in Salisbury	1950	1954	
MD 475	—	—	South Street in Frederick	MD 144 in Frederick	2001	2009	
MD 476	—	—	MD 144 in Lisbon	north of Old Frederick Road	1933	1956	
MD 477	—	—	US 1 near Elkridge	US 1	1933	1983	
MD 478	—	—	US 40 in Parkhead	dead end in Parkhead	1933	1955	Old US 40
MD 478	1.88	3.03	MD 180 in Knoxville	Brunswick	1968	current	
MD 479	—	—	US 50 in Cambridge	Eastern Shore State Hospital in Cambridge	1933	1983	
MD 480	9.08	14.61	MD 404 in Hillsboro	MD 313 in Greensboro	1933	current	
MD 481	5.13	8.26	MD 309 near Queen Anne	MD 304 in Ruthsburg	1933	current	
MD 482	5.41	8.71	MD 27 in Mexico	MD 30 Business in Hampstead	1933	current	
MD 483	—	—	MD 174 in Severn		1933	1946	
MD 484	—	—	MD 224 in Marbury	MD 425 in Pisgah	1933	1987	Until 1957, continued east to MD 6 in Port Tobacco
MD 485	—	—	US 50 (now Ocean Gateway/old MD 731) in Vienna	MD 487 in Vienna	1933	1955	now Middle Street
MD 485	0.65	1.05	Loop from MD 404 near Hillsboro		—	—	Longest section
MD 486	—	—	MD 331 (now Rhodesdale Vienna Road) in Vienna	US 50 (now Ocean Gateway/old MD 731) in Vienna	1933	1955	Became part of rerouted MD 331; the old route became the turn lane
MD 487	—	—	US 50 (now Ocean Gateway/old MD 731) in Vienna	MD 485 in Vienna	1933	1955	now Race Street
MD 488	6.01	9.67	MD 6 in La Plata	MD 5 in Bryantown	1933	current	
MD 489	—	—	MD 314 in Whiteleysburg	Delaware state line	1933	1950	Now part of MD 314; the old route of MD 314 via 2 State road was decommissioned
MD 489	1.27	2.04	MD 5 at Park Hall	MD 235 near Park Hall	1956	current	
MD 490	0.31	0.50	Commerce Street in Havre de Grace	MD 7 in Havre de Grace	1933	current	
MD 491	—	—	MD 6 in Ironsides	MD 6 near Ironsides	1933	1956	Now part of MD 425
MD 491	6.78	10.91	MD 64 in Smithsburg	MD 550 in Fort Ritchie	1957	current	
MD 492	—	—	District of Columbia boundary	MD 214 near Capitol Heights	1933	1954	
MD 493	—	—	creek crossing due south of Martin Plaza Shopping Plaza	MD 150 in Middle River	1933	1941	Decommissioned when MD 700 was built
MD 494	6.83	10.99	PA 75 near Fairview	MD 63 at Cearfoss	1933	current	
MD 495	23.02	37.05	MD 135 at Altamont	US 40 Alternate in Grantsville	1933	current	
MD 496	7.23	11.64	MD 97 near Westminster	MD 30 near Manchester	1933	current	
MD 497	2.68	4.31	MD 2 / MD 4 in Lusby	Cove Point	1933	current	
MD 498	—	—	MD 249 in Piney Point	Piney Point Light	1933	1981	
MD 499	—	—	MD 238 in Maddox	Hurry Road	1933	1956	
MD 500	2.22	3.57	Michigan Avenue in Washington, D.C.	MD 410 in Hyattsville	1933	current	
MD 501	1.68	2.70	MD 212 in Chillum	MD 500 in Mount Rainier	1933	current	
MD 502	—	—	Virginia state line	MD 366 in Stockton	1946	1960	
MD 503	—	—	Olivet	MD 2 (now MD 765) near Lusby	1933	1957	
MD 504	—	—	near the confluence of Back Creek and St. John Creek	MD 2 (now MD 765) near Lusby	1933	1957	
MD 505	—	—	near the confluence of Hellen Creek and the Patuxent River	MD 2 near Lusby	1933	1957	
MD 506	3.79	6.10	MD 508 at Bowens	MD 2 / MD 4 near Port Republic	1933	current	
MD 507	—	—	Barstow Road & Leitches Wharf Road	MD 2 near Lusby	1933	1957	
MD 508	1.20	1.93	MD 506 at Bowens	MD 231 near Barstow	1933	current	
MD 509	1.14	1.83	MD 2 / MD 4 in Port Republic	Kenwood Beach	1933	current	
MD 510	—	—	Mill Branch Road	MD 262 in Sunderland	1933	1957	
MD 511	—	—	Patuxent River	MD 264 near Mutual	1933	1957	
MD 512	—	—	Patuxent River	MD 264 near Mutual	1933	1957	
MD 513	—	—	Piney Branch Road in Washington, D.C.	MD 320 in Silver Spring	1933	1955	
MD 513	1.77	2.85	Jackson Road near Fruitland	US 13 Business in Fruitland	1987	current	
MD 514	—	—	Sligo Creek	MD 320/MD 513 in Silver Spring	1933	1939	now Park Valley Road; unlabeled on the 1933 and 1935 maps
MD 514	4.89	7.87	MD 20 in Chestertown	MD 298 at Melitota	1950	current	
MD 515	—	—	MD 384 in Silver Spring	MD 391 in Silver Spring	1933	1960	
MD 516	—	—	US 29	MD 193 in Silver Spring	1933	1999	
MD 517	—	—	MD 24 in Five Forks	MD 23 in Norrisville	1933	1956	
MD 518	0.06	0.097	Section of Main Street in Queen Anne		1933	current	
MD 519	—	—	Worthington Road near Reisterstown	Dover Road near Reisterstown	1933	1979	
MD 520	2.61	4.20	Whites Neck Creek	MD 239 near Bushwood	1933	current	
MD 521	4.43	7.13	Lowery Road near Huntingtown	MD 524 in Huntingtown	1933	current	
MD 523	—	—	Patuxent River	MD 416 (now MD 4) in Chaneyville	1933	1957	
MD 523	—	—	Pennsylvania State line	Resley Street in Hancock	1966	1970	
MD 524	—	—	Mount Harmony Road (previously MD 260)	MD 2 (now MD 778) near Owings	1933	1957	
MD 524	0.76	1.22	Loop from MD 2 / MD 4 in Huntingtown		1969	current	
MD 525	—	—	Patuxent River	MD 416 (now MD 4) in Dunkirk	1933	1957	
MD 526	—	—	MD 545 in Elkton	MD 280 in Elkton	1933	1955	Elkton Blvd; became part of MD 545
MD 526	—	—	Main Street in Westminster	MD 97, MD 140 in Westminster	1954	1999	
MD 526	0.13	0.21	Spur from MD 140 in Reisterstown		2014	current	
MD 527	—	—	US 1 in Elkridge	Dead end in Elkridge	1933	1957	
MD 528	9.04	14.55	MD 378 in Ocean City	DE 1 in Ocean City	1933	current	
MD 529	2.57	4.14	MD 675 in Princess Anne	US 13 near Eden	1933	current	Formerly continued north through Allen to Salisbury
MD 530	0.14	0.23	High Street in Chestertown	US 213 in Chestertown	1933	1960	
MD 531	—	—	US 1 in Jessup	MD 103 near Ellicott City	1933	1946	Became part of MD 175 (now MD 108 and MD 104)
MD 531	—	—	Galestown	MD 392 in Reliance	1946	1959	
MD 532	—	—	MD 27 (now MD 808) in Mount Airy	US 40 in Lisbon	1933	1956	
MD 533	1.25	2.01	Cobb Island	MD 3 (now MD 257) near Rock Point	1933	1958	Renumbered MD 254
MD 534	—	—	MD 4 in Forestville	MD 221 (now Ritchie-Marlboro Road) near Largo	1933	1955	
MD 535	—	—	MD 14 near Brookview		1933	1955	
MD 535	0.16	0.26	MD 5 in Temple Hills	Auth Road in Temple Hills	2001	current	
MD 536	—	—	MD 6	south of Mill Swamp Road near Welcome	1933	1956	
MD 537	—	—	MD 135 in Swanton	Savage River State Forest	1933	1946	Became part of MD 495
MD 537	0.49	0.79	MD 213 in Chesapeake City	Chesapeake and Delaware Canal	1949	current	Longest section
MD 537	0.71	1.14	Loop from MD 213 near Galena		1951	1987	
MD 539	—	—	US 29 in Columbia	MD 175 in Jonestown	1956	1959	Became part of MD 108
MD 540	—	—	MD 410 in Takoma Park	MD 513 in Takoma Park	1933	1955	Chestnut Avenue
MD 541	—	—	MD 349	Tyaskin	1933	1956	
MD 542	6.33	10.19	MD 147 in Baltimore	Cromwell Bridge Road in Parkville	1933	current	
MD 543	19.08	30.71	US 40 in Riverside	MD 165 in Pylesville	1933	current	
MD 544	9.48	15.26	MD 213 in Kingstown	MD 313 near Unicorn	1933	current	Contiguous sections
MD 545	5.92	9.53	MD 213 in Elkton	Warburton Road in Cedar Hill	1933	current	
MD 546	3.61	5.81	Beall School Road in Finzel	PA QR 2010 near Finzel	1933	current	
MD 547	1.80	2.90	MD 355 in North Bethesda	MD 185 in Kensington	1933	current	
MD 548	—	—	MD 529 (now Allen Road)	south port of the Upper Ferry (Wicomico River)	1933	1956	
MD 549	—	—	MD 224 (now Livingston Road)	Fort Washington Park	1933	1956	
MD 550	24.43	39.32	MD 26 in Libertytown	Pen Mar	1933	current	
MD 551	—	—	MD 343 (now High Street) in Cambridge	MD 16 (now MD 341)	1946	1956	Replaced by relocated MD 343
MD 552	2.20	3.54	Dominion	US 50 / US 301 in Chester	1933	current	
MD 553	0.28	0.45	MD 2 in Edgewater	South River	1933	current	Longest section
MD 554	—	—	MD 170 (now High Street) in Severn	Fort Meade	1933	1983	Replaced by MD 174
MD 555	—	—	MD 263 in Plum Point	4 miles south	1933	1957	
MD 556	—	—	MD 450 near Woodmore	MD 202	1933	1989	Replaced by MD 193
MD 557	—	—	MD 355 in Gaithersburg	MD 114 in Gaithersburg	1933	1973	
MD 558	—	—	US 301 in Bel Alton	MD 6 in Newtown	1933	1956	
MD 559	—	—	Westminster city limits	Tannery	1933	1956	
MD 560	9.32	15.00	US 50 at Gorman	MD 135 in Mountain Lake Park	1933	current	
MD 561	2.48	3.99	MD 213 at Hassengers Corner	MD 298 in Lynch	1933	current	
MD 562	1.39	2.24	Markoe Road near Monkton	MD 138 near Monkton	1933	current	
MD 563	—	—	MD 6 in Riverside	MD 224 (now MD 344) in Chicamuxen	1933	1956	
MD 564	6.73	10.83	MD 450 in Lanham	Bowie	1934	current	
MD 565	5.18	8.34	Trappe	US 50 near Easton	1941	current	Longest section
MD 566	1.19	1.92	MD 292 in Still Pond	MD 298 near Still Pond	1946	current	
MD 567	—	—	Cromwell Valley Park near Towson	Cub Hill Road near Carney	1934	1998	
MD 568	0.41	0.66	MD 367 in Bishopville	Bishopville Road at the Delaware state line near Bishopville	1934	current	
MD 569	—	—	Lemmon Road near Westminster	Beggs Road near Westminster	1934	1956	
MD 570	—	—	MD 32 near Fenby	Obrecht Road near Eldersburg	1934	1954	Became part of MD 97
MD 570	1.95	3.14	I-70 / I-695 in Woodlawn	MD 122 / Park and ride in Baltimore	2020	current	Former I-70
MD 571	—	—	MD 32 (now MD 140)	Pennsylvania state line in Emmitsburg	1934	1950	
MD 572	—	—	MD 67 in Gapland	Washington–Frederick county line in Crampton's Gap	1934	1956	
MD 573	—	—	MD 26 in Eldersburg	MD 570 (now MD 97) northwest of Eldersburg	1934	1954	
MD 574	—	—	MD 235 (now MD 944) near Hollywood	near Scotch Neck Road near Hollywood	1934	1983	
MD 575	—	—	MD 2 (now MD 944) near Huntingtown	MD 261 near Willows	1934	1957	
MD 575	2.70	4.35	US 113 near Berlin	MD 589 near Showell	2000	current	Longest section
MD 576	—	—	Tulls Corner Road	MD 371 in Pocomoke City	1934	1954	
MD 577	3.70	5.95	MD 392 in Reliance	MD 313 near Federalsburg	1934	current	
MD 578	4.24	6.82	MD 331 in Bethlehem	MD 16 at Harmony	1934	current	
MD 579	7.84	12.62	Neavitt	MD 33 near Saint Michaels	1934	current	
MD 580	—	—	US 13	MD 364 in West Pocomoke	1946	1950	
MD 581	—	—	Keysville	MD 71 (now MD 194) south of Keysville	1934	1954	
MD 582	—	—	Brookeville Road near Olney	Gregg Road in Montgomery County	1934	1956	
MD 583	—	—	Hipsley Mill Road	Daisy Road near Florence	1934	1950	
MD 584	0.38	0.61	Loop from MD 5 in St. Mary's City		1934	current	
MD 585	—	—	MD 12	MD 390 near Salisbury	1934	1956	
MD 586	5.78	9.30	MD 28 / MD 911 in Rockville	MD 97 in Wheaton	1934	current	
MD 587	1.14	1.83	Dogwood Drive in Middle River	MD 150 in Middle River	1934	current	
MD 588	1.94	3.12	MD 7 in Rosedale	Overlea	1934	current	
MD 589	4.65	7.48	US 50 near Ocean Pines	US 113 / MD 575 near Showell	1934	current	
MD 590	—	—	US 1 near Kalmia	US 1 near Dublin	1935	1953	
MD 591	0.80	1.29	Octoraro Creek	US 1 near Conowingo	1934	current	Longest section
MD 592	0.23	0.37	MD 273 near Rising Sun	US 1 near Rising Sun	1934	1958	
MD 593	—	—	Sligo Creek Parkway in Silver Spring	MD 193 in Silver Spring	1934	1958	
MD 594	—	—	MD 391 (now Dale Drive) in Silver Spring	MD 194 (now Flower Avenue) in Silver Spring	1934	1958	
MD 594	1.40	2.25	US 29 in Silver Spring	Flower Avenue in Silver Spring	2016	current	
MD 595	—	—	MD 391 (now Dale Drive) in Silver Spring	Queen Annes Drive in Silver Spring	1934	1958	
MD 596	—	—	MD 391 (now Dale Drive) in Silver Spring	Woodside Parkway in Silver Spring	1934	1958	
MD 597	—	—	Dallas Avenue in Silver Spring	US 29 in Silver Spring	1934	1946	Replaced by MD 192
MD 597	—	—	loop off of US 1 near Harwood Park		1946	1956	
MD 598	—	—	US 13 in Westover	US 13 (now MD 675) in Princess Anne	1934	1961	
MD 599	—	—	MD 700 (now Orems Road) in Middle River	MD 150 in Middle River	1934	1975	Railroad crossing connecting sections eliminated
MD 600	—	—	MD 150 in Middle River	MD 599 in Middle River	1934	1975	main section removed 1950
MD 601	—	—	MD 599 in Middle River	MD 600 in Middle River	1934	1975	
MD 607	1.54	2.48	Woods Road near Jacobsville	MD 173 in Jacobsville	—	—	
MD 610	6.53	10.51	Bell Road near Whaleyville	US 113 near Bishop	—	—	
MD 611	8.51	13.70	Assateague State Park	US 50 in West Ocean City	—	—	
MD 614	1.97	3.17	MacArthur Boulevard in Glen Echo	MD 191 in Bethesda	—	—	
MD 615	4.35	7.00	I-70 / US 40 near Hancock	Heavenly Acres Ridge Road at the Pennsylvania state line	—	—	
MD 617	0.35	0.56	Beauchamp Branch Road near Williston	MD 16 in Williston	—	—	
MD 619	1.09	1.75	5th Avenue in Denton	MD 313 / MD 404 in Denton	—	—	
MD 623	7.26	11.68	MD 161 in Darlington	PA QR 2043 near Delta, PA	—	—	
MD 624	2.87	4.62	MD 165 in Pylesville	PA QR 2080 near Graceton	—	—	
MD 625	1.36	2.19	MD 5 in Hughesville	MD 5 in Hughesville	—	—	
MD 627	2.48	3.99	Crab Island Road in Oriole	MD 363 near Oriole	—	—	
MD 631	0.35	0.56	Spur from Brandywine Road near Brandywine		—	—	
MD 632	6.71	10.80	MD 63 in Downsville	Wilson Boulevard in Hagerstown	—	—	
MD 636	0.28	0.45	MD 53 in Cresaptown	US 220 in Cresaptown	—	—	
MD 637	0.61	0.98	Naylor Road in Washington, D.C.	MD 5 in Hillcrest Heights	—	—	
MD 638	2.34	3.77	MD 743 in Eckhart Mines	MD 36 near Mount Savage	—	—	
MD 639	2.79	4.49	MD 51 in Evitts Creek	US 40 Alternate in Cumberland	—	—	
MD 640	0.58	0.93	Eastern Correctional Institution	US 13 near Westover	—	—	
MD 642	0.08	0.13	Spur from MD 173 in Orchard Beach		—	—	
MD 644	0.03	0.048	US 1 in Arbutus	Sulphur Spring Road in Arbutus	—	—	Longest section
MD 645	0.12	0.19	Spur from Railroad Avenue in Harmans		—	—	Longest section
MD 646	3.31	5.33	MD 543 at Ady	MD 136 near Whiteford	—	—	
MD 648	21.52	34.63	US 50/US 301 in Arnold	MD 295 in Baltimore	—	—	This highway is split into multiple sections along Maryland Route 2, Among all the old remnants of Baltimore-Annapolis Boulevard. See historical page for more details.
MD 650	25.89	41.67	New Hampshire Avenue in Washington, D.C.	MD 108 near Damascus	—	—	
MD 652	0.69	1.11	Spur from MD 176 near Harmans		—	—	
MD 655	1.86	2.99	MD 28 at Norbeck	Carrolton Road near Norbeck	—	—	
MD 656	0.70	1.13	MD 18 in Queenstown	MD 456 in Queenstown	—	—	
MD 658	0.84	1.35	MD 53 in La Vale	US 40 Alternate in La Vale	—	—	
MD 660	0.05	0.080	MD 355 in Rockville	MD 28 in Rockville	—	—	
MD 661	2.22	3.57	MD 289 near Pomona	Chester River	1939	1994	
MD 662	6.10	9.82	Easton	US 50 near Longwoods	—	—	Longest section
MD 662	3.13	5.04	Railroad crossing in Kennedyville	Turners Creek near the Sassafras River	1939	1946	
MD 664	1.65	2.66	MD 289 near Chestertown	Chester River	1939	1960	
MD 665	2.68	4.31	US 50 / US 301 in Parole	Forest Drive in Annapolis	—	—	
MD 667	17.61	28.34	Crisfield	US 13 in West Pocomoke	—	—	
MD 668	0.14	0.23	Spur from Harvey Yingling Road near Manchester		—	—	
MD 669	1.69	2.72	US 40 Alternate in Grantsville	PA 669 near Grantsville	—	—	
MD 670	1.48	2.38	MD 347 in Hebron	US 50 near Hebron	—	—	
MD 672	0.19	0.31	Spur from MD 648 near Annapolis		—	—	
MD 673	0.53	0.85	MD 413 in Westover	US 13 near Westover	—	—	
MD 674	0.25	0.40	Rock Hall	MD 20 in Rock Hall	1940	current	
MD 675	3.39	5.46	US 13 near Princess Anne	US 13 near Princess Anne	—	—	Longest section
MD 685	0.16	0.26	Loop from MD 213 at Hack Point		1953	1979	Longest section
MD 690	1.46	2.35	MD 273 near Rising Sun	Sylmar Road at the Pennsylvania state line	1957	1958	
MD 694	0.10	0.16	Spur from MD 212 in Beltsville		—	—	
MD 695	19.37	31.17	—	—	—	2024	
MD 697	0.25	0.40	MD 274 at Bay View	MD 699 at Bay View	1969	1979	
MD 698	0.11	0.18	Dead end at railroad	High Street in Chestertown	1940	1985	
MD 699	0.99	1.59	Loop from MD 272 at Bay View		1941	1979	Longest section
MD 700	1.97	3.17	US 40 near Rosedale	MD 150 in Middle River	—	—	
MD 701	0.14	0.23	MD 291 near Millington	US 301 near Millington	1988	current	Longest section
MD 702	4.17	6.71	I-695 in Essex	Back River Neck Road near Essex	—	—	
MD 703	0.08	0.13	MD 366 near Klej Grange		—	—	
MD 704	6.53	10.51	63rd Street in Washington, D.C.	MD 450 in Lanham	—	—	
MD 707	1.44	2.32	Near Berlin	MD 589 near Ocean Pines	—	—	Longest section
MD 710	2.83	4.55	MD 2 in Glen Burnie	MD 173 near Brooklyn Park	—	—	
MD 711	0.51	0.82	MD 2 in Glen Burnie	Arundel Corporation Road in Glen Burnie	—	—	
MD 711	0.75	1.21	MD 545 near Elkton	MD 280 near Elkton	1943	1958	
MD 712	1.11	1.79	MD 235 in Lexington Park	NAS Patuxent River	—	—	
MD 713	3.01	4.84	Fort Meade	MD 176 in Hanover	—	—	
MD 714	0.20	0.32	Rivers Edge West near Millington	MD 291 near Millington	1957	1987	
MD 715	1.06	1.71	US 40 in Aberdeen	Aberdeen Proving Ground	—	—	
MD 717	0.33	0.53	MD 4 in Upper Marlboro	MD 725 in Upper Marlboro	—	—	
MD 723	0.18	0.29	Spur from MD 175 in Jessup		—	—	
MD 725	1.86	2.99	Brown Station Road in Upper Marlboro	US 301 near Upper Marlboro	—	—	
MD 726	0.28	0.45	Hunt Club Road near Upper Marlboro	Marlboro Pike near Upper Marlboro	—	—	
MD 727	0.12	0.19	MD 268 in Elkton	Amtrak's Northeast Corridor	1949	current	Longest section
MD 731	0.38	0.61	Spur from US 50 near Mardela Springs		—	—	Longest section
MD 732	0.82	1.32	Brock Bridge Road in Annapolis Junction	MD 32 in Annapolis Junction	—	—	Longest section
MD 733	0.14	0.23	Spur from US 40 Alternate near Grantsville		—	—	Longest section
MD 735	0.06	0.097	Virginia Avenue in Hancock	Methodist Street in Hancock	—	—	
MD 736	1.27	2.04	I-68 / US 40 near Midlothian	Park Avenue in Frostburg	—	—	
MD 739	0.16	0.26	Old alignment of US 40 in Washington County		2019	current	
MD 740	0.29	0.47	Service road parallel to US 40 in Aberdeen		2015	current	
MD 741	0.06	0.097	Spur from US 40 Alternate near Benevola		—	—	
MD 742	0.93	1.50	MD 42 in Friendsville	MD 42 / I-68 near Friendsville	—	—	
MD 743	1.00	1.61	MD 36 in Frostburg	US 40 Alternate in Eckhart Mines	—	—	
MD 746	0.13	0.21	Spur from MD 25 near Towson		—	—	
MD 750	0.87	1.40	Loop from US 50 / MD 16 near Cambridge		—	—	
MD 752	0.15	0.24	Spur from MD 231 near Barstow		—	2017	
MD 755	1.79	2.88	Aberdeen Proving Ground	US 40 in Edgewood	—	—	
MD 756	1.17	1.88	US 13 in Pocomoke City	US 113 near Pocomoke City	—	—	
MD 758	1.02	1.64	Stoney Run Road in Hanover	Ridge Road in Hanover	—	—	
MD 759	0.21	0.34	Spur from MD 18 in Stevensville		—	—	
MD 760	4.65	7.48	Drum Point	MD 2 / MD 4 in Lusby	—	—	
MD 761	0.23	0.37	Loop from MD 263 near Parran		—	—	
MD 762	0.53	0.85	MD 162 in Linthicum	MD 170 in Linthicum	—	—	
MD 763	0.28	0.45	MD 155 in Havre de Grace	Juniata Street in Havre De Grace	—	—	
MD 764	0.09	0.14	Pinewood Terrace near Parran	MD 261 near Parran	—	—	Longest section
MD 765	5.91	9.51	Dowell Road near Solomons	MD 2 / MD 4 near Lusby	—	—	Longest section
MD 768	0.68	1.09	MD 402 in Dares Beach	Chesapeake Avenue in Dares Beach	—	—	
MD 769	1.06	1.71	MD 201 near Bladensburg	MD 201 in Bladensburg	—	—	Longest section
MD 776	0.77	1.24	MD 312 / MD 480 near Ridgely	MD 312 in Ridgely	—	—	
MD 778	2.12	3.41	MD 2 in Owings	MD 261 in Friendship	—	—	
MD 779	0.15	0.24	Spur from MD 174 in Glen Burnie		—	—	Longest section
MD 781	1.01	1.63	US 40 in Elkton	MD 281 near Elkton	1984	current	
MD 783	0.23	0.37	MD 436 in Parole	Riverview Court in Parole	—	—	
MD 784	0.24	0.39	Spur from MD 436 in Parole		—	—	
MD 785	0.29	0.47	Spur from MD 784 in Parole		—	—	
MD 787	0.20	0.32	MD 195 in Takoma Park	MD 320	1956	2012	ended at MD 516 before 1999.
MD 788	0.20	0.32	MD 387 in Annapolis	Forest Drive in Annapolis	—	—	
MD 794	2.75	4.43	MD 4 in Bristol	MD 408 at Waysons Corner	—	—	
MD 795	0.07	0.11	Cambridge Creek Bridge in Cambridge		—	—	
MD 795	0.47	0.76	I-795 / MD 140 in Reisterstown	MD 30 / MD 128 in Reisterstown	—	—	
MD 796	0.29	0.47	Loop from MD 258 near Tracys Landing		—	—	Longest section
MD 797	0.27	0.43	State Circle around the Maryland State House in Annapolis		—	—	
MD 798	0.34	0.55	Sherwood Forest Road near Crownsville	MD 178 near Crownsville	—	—	
MD 800	1.57	2.53	MD 75 near Linwood	MD 75 near New Windsor	—	—	Longest section
MD 801	1.05	1.69	MD 313 near Galena	MD 290 / MD 313 near Galena	1957	1987	
MD 802	1.01	1.63	MD 8 near Normans	MD 8 near Matapeake	—	—	
MD 803	1.53	2.46	MD 299 near Warwick	Delaware state line near Warwick	1955	1979	Two sections
MD 804	0.79	1.27	Loop from MD 64 in Chewsville		—	—	
MD 805	0.15	0.24	Spur from Rocky Forge Road near Leitersburg		—	—	
MD 806	3.04	4.89	US 15 near Catoctin Furnace	Thurmont	—	—	Longest section
MD 807	3.52	5.66	Cumberland	US 220 near Dickens	—	—	
MD 808	2.34	3.77	Ridgeville Boulevard in Mount Airy	MD 27 near Mount Airy	—	—	
MD 809	0.91	1.46	Loop from MD 273 at Calvert		1958	1979	
MD 810	0.69	1.11	MD 210 in Accokeek	Manning Road in Accokeek	—	—	Longest section
MD 811	0.19	0.31	South town limit of Rising Sun	MD 273 in Rising Sun	1958	1979	
MD 812	0.19	0.31	Loop from MD 213 at Singerly		1958	1982	Longest section
MD 813	0.12	0.19	MD 313 in Sharptown	State Street in Sharptown	—	—	
MD 813	2.09	3.36	Dead end near Woodlawn	MD 273 in Harrisville	1963	1979	Longest section
MD 814	0.29	0.47	Monocacy River	Penterra Manor Lane near Creagerstown	—	2016	
MD 815	0.72	1.16	Loop from MD 349 near Salisbury		—	—	
MD 816	—	—	Loop from MD 16 near Madison		—	1970	
MD 817	0.52	0.84	MD 318 near Linchester	Hunting Creek	—	—	Longest section
MD 818	2.62	4.22	US 113 in Berlin	US 113 near Berlin	—	—	
MD 819	0.19	0.31	Loop from MD 331 in Reids Grove		—	—	
MD 820	0.13	0.21	Spur from MD 313 near Goldsboro		—	—	
MD 821	0.40	0.64	Loop from MD 454 in Marydel		—	—	
MD 822	0.85	1.37	US 13 in Princess Anne	University of Maryland, Eastern Shore	—	—	
MD 822	0.65	1.05	Spur north from MD 803 near Warwick		1955	1979	
MD 823	0.61	0.98	MD 316 near Elkton	MD 279 near Elkton	1962	1979	
MD 824	1.06	1.71	MD 222 in Perryville	MD 222 / MD 275 near Perryville	1952	current	
MD 825	0.94	1.51	MD 135 near Oakland	MD 135 in Mountain Lake Park	—	—	Longest section
MD 826	0.60	0.97	Parallels US 219 between a pair of dead ends near Keyser's Ridge		—	—	Longest section
MD 827	0.05	0.080	Parallels MD 39 between a pair of dead ends near Crellin		—	—	Longest section
MD 828	0.13	0.21	Spur from MD 42 near Friendsville		—	—	Longest section
MD 830	0.04	0.064	Spur from US 220 near Rawlings		—	—	Longest section
MD 831	0.90	1.45	Loop from MD 36 in Corriganville		—	—	Longest section
MD 832	7.67	12.34	MD 140 in Taneytown	MD 140 in Westminster	—	—	
MD 833	0.84	1.35	MD 30 Business in Hampstead	MD 88 in Hampstead	—	—	
MD 834	0.16	0.26	Granny Branch Road near Price	Maryland and Delaware Railroad near Price	—	—	
MD 835	0.77	1.24	Loop from MD 18 in Stevensville		—	—	Longest section
MD 835	0.26	0.42	Loop from MD 273 near Rising Sun		1953	1958	
MD 837	0.12	0.19	MD 300 in Sudlersville	MD 313 in Sudlersville	—	—	
MD 843	0.16	0.26	Spur from MD 63 near Williamsport		—	—	Longest section
MD 844	0.29	0.47	Spur from MD 64 near Cavetown		—	—	
MD 845	1.23	1.98	MD 34 in Keedysville	MD 34 in Keedysville	—	—	
MD 846	0.10	0.16	Spur from MD 416 near Ringgold		—	—	Longest section
MD 847	0.14	0.23	Spur from Welty Church Road near Smithsburg		—	—	
MD 849	0.36	0.58	MD 852 in Mexico	MD 482 near Mexico	—	—	
MD 850	1.75	2.82	Winfield	MD 26 near Eldersburg	—	—	Longest section
MD 851	2.88	4.63	MD 32 near Sykesville	MD 32 in Sykesville	—	—	
MD 852	3.72	5.99	MD 31 in New Windsor	MD 31 near Westminster	—	—	Longest section
MD 853	0.37	0.60	Parallels MD 194 between a pair of dead ends near Taneytown		—	—	Longest section
MD 854	3.93	6.32	Muller Road near Morgan Run NEA	MD 32 at Fenby	—	—	Longest section
MD 855	0.06	0.097	Loop from MD 213 near Kennedyville		1956	current	Longest section
MD 856	0.10	0.16	Loop from MD 298 in Lynch		1959	current	
MD 857	0.39	0.63	Loop from MD 566 in Still Pond		1959	1987	
MD 858	1.00	1.61	MD 67 in Rohrersville	MD 67 near Rohrersville	—	—	Longest section
MD 859	0.88	1.42	MD 291 near Morgnec	Dead end east of Morgnec	1963	1987	Longest section
MD 863	0.20	0.32	Loop from MD 5 in Charlotte Hall		—	—	
MD 864	0.11	0.18	Loop from MD 292 near Still Pond		1968	current	
MD 868	0.07	0.11	Spur from MD 236 at Budds Creek		—	—	
MD 870	0.20	0.32	Bowmans Farm Road in Frederick	MD 144 in Frederick	—	—	
MD 871	0.91	1.46	MD 79 in Rosemont	MD 17 near Rosemont	—	—	Longest section
MD 872	0.33	0.53	Spur from MD 180 near Petersville		—	—	
MD 873	0.37	0.60	Spur from US 15 Business near Emmitsburg		—	2016	
MD 874	0.14	0.23	Former sections of MD 75 near New London		—	—	Longest section
MD 877	0.37	0.60	Spur from MD 75 near New Market		—	—	
MD 878	0.10	0.16	Spur from Broadfording Road in Hagerstown		—	2015	
MD 879	0.60	0.97	Loop from MD 91 near Finksburg		—	—	Longest section
MD 889	0.10	0.16	Spur from MD 137 in Hereford		—	—	
MD 894	0.10	0.16	MD 144 in Hancock	Limestone Road in Hancock	—	—	
MD 895	—	—	US 29 in White Oak	MD 650	—	1999	
MD 896	0.21	0.34	DE 896 near Newark, DE	PA 896 near Strickersville, PA	1946	current	
MD 899	0.17	0.27	Muddy Branch	Cherry Grove Drive near Gaithersburg	—	—	Longest section
MD 901	—	—	MD 121 in Clarksburg	Montgomery County Correctional Facility	—	1999	
MD 903	0.91	1.46	US 40 Scenic at Sideling Hill	I-68 / US 40 at Sideling Hill	—	—	
MD 904	0.66	1.06	Jim Bowers Road near Eldersburg	Morgan Run NEA	—	—	Longest section
MD 908	2.52	4.06	MD 179 near Cape St. Claire	Skidmore	—	—	
MD 909	0.80	1.29	Spur from MD 424 near Davidsonville		—	—	
MD 910	0.59	0.95	MD 144 in Hagerstown	US 40 in Hagerstown	—	—	Longest section
MD 911	0.21	0.34	MD 355 in Rockville	MD 28 / MD 586 in Rockville	—	—	
MD 912	0.56	0.90	Loop from MD 282 near Earleville		1967	1979	Longest section
MD 913	0.19	0.31	Spur from MD 267 in Charlestown		1968	1974	
MD 915	0.89	1.43	Spur from MD 177 in Pasadena		—	—	Longest section
MD 917	0.09	0.14	MD 175 in Jessup	Max Blob Park Road in Jessup	—	—	
MD 918	0.22	0.35	MD 675 in Princess Anne	University of Maryland, Eastern Shore	—	—	
MD 920	0.97	1.56	Loop from US 13 near Princess Anne		—	—	Longest section
MD 921	0.44	0.71	Spur from US 113 near Ironshire		—	—	Longest section
MD 922	0.24	0.39	US 1 Business / MD 22 / MD 924 in Bel Air	US 1 Business in Bel Air	—	—	
MD 924	7.34	11.81	MD 24 near Edgewood	US 1 / MD 24 near Bel Air	—	—	
MD 925	2.49	4.01	Billingsley Road in White Plains	MD 5 Business in Waldorf	—	—	
MD 927	0.45	0.72	Montrose Road through its interchange with I-270 near Rockville		—	—	Longest section
MD 928	0.19	0.31	Loop from MD 28 at Norbeck		—	—	Longest section
MD 929	0.31	0.50	Section of Randolph Road west from US 29 in Fairland		—	—	Longest section
MD 931	0.38	0.61	College Parkway in Cape St. Claire	Old Cape St. Claire Road in Cape St. Claire	—	—	Longest section
MD 932	0.55	0.89	Ten Oaks Road near Glenelg	MD 32 near Glenelg	—	—	Longest section
MD 935	2.99	4.81	MD 36 near Barton	MD 36 near Nikep	—	—	
MD 936	5.19	8.35	Church Street in Midland	US 40 Alternate / MD 36 in Frostburg	—	—	
MD 937	1.53	2.46	MD 135 in Westernport	MD 36 near Westernport	—	—	
MD 939	0.01	0.016	Spur from MD 36 near Barton		—	—	
MD 940	1.48	2.38	Red Run Boulevard in Owings Mills	MD 140 in Owings Mills	—	—	
MD 942	0.06	0.097	Blue Bridge across the Potomac River in Cumberland		—	—	
MD 943	0.59	0.95	I-83 in Cockeysville	Beaver Dam Road in Cockeysville	—	—	
MD 944	2.26	3.64	Mervell Dean Road near California	MD 235 in Hollywood	—	—	
MD 945	0.10	0.16	Spur from MD 235 in Hollywood		—	—	
MD 946	0.61	0.98	US 40 Alternate near Finzel	MD 546 in Finzel	—	—	
MD 948	0.62	1.00	Spur from US 219 near Keyser's Ridge		—	—	Longest segment
MD 949	0.56	0.90	Spur from MD 658 in La Vale		—	—	Longest segment
MD 950	0.42	0.68	Lottsford Vista Road near Lanham	Cleary Lane near Lanham	—	—	Longest segment
MD 951	0.23	0.37	Loop from MD 53 near Cresaptown		—	—	
MD 952	0.31	0.50	Hillcrest Drive at I-68 / US 40 / US 220 near Cumberland		—	—	Longest segment
MD 953	3.53	5.68	MD 193 near Glenn Dale	Amtrak's Northeast Corridor	—	—	
MD 954	0.20	0.32	Choptank River	US 50 near Trappe	—	—	
MD 956	0.53	0.85	US 220 near Pinto	WV 956 in Rocket Center, WV	—	—	
MD 958	0.21	0.34	Spur from US 1 near Jessup		—	—	
MD 963	0.01	0.016	Spur from Hill Road near Seat Pleasant		—	—	
MD 964	0.10	0.16	Spur from Red Top Road in Chillum		—	—	
MD 965	0.54	0.87	Eastern Avenue in Washington, D.C.	Kenilworth Avenue near Cheverly	—	—	Longest section
MD 967	0.98	1.58	MD 5 near Silver Hill	MD 414 in Silver Hill	—	—	Longest section
MD 968	0.05	0.080	MD 193 in Greenbelt	National Guard Armory	—	—	
MD 969	0.11	0.18	MD 168 in Linthicum	I-695 in Linthicum	—	—	Longest section
MD 972	0.43	0.69	MD 458 in Suitland	Marlboro Pike in District Heights	—	—	
MD 973	0.06	0.097	Spur from MD 459 in Cheverly		—	—	
MD 974	0.10	0.16	Spur from MD 193 in Woodmore		—	—	
MD 975	0.06	0.097	St. Barnabas Road in Oxon Hill	MD 414 in Oxon Hill	—	—	
MD 976	0.31	0.50	Loop from MD 3 in Bowie		—	—	Longest section
MD 977	0.48	0.77	MD 202 in Largo	MD 214 in Largo	—	—	Longest section
MD 978	0.84	1.35	Loop from MD 214 near Bowie		—	—	Longest section
MD 979	0.07	0.11	Main Street between the one-way pair of US 1 in Laurel		—	—	
MD 980	2.05	3.30	Lyons Creek	Wrighton Road in Bristol	—	—	Longest section
MD 981	0.11	0.18	Loop from MD 108 near Ellicott City		—	—	
MD 983	1.02	1.64	North Laurel	Old Scaggsville Road in North Laurel	1963	2017	Longest section
MD 984	0.22	0.35	US 40 in Ellicott City	Normandy Drive in Ellicott City	—	—	
MD 985	0.55	0.89	Spur from Rogers Avenue in Ellicott City		—	—	Longest section
MD 986	0.06	0.097	Spur from Old Columbia Road in Columbia		—	—	
MD 989	0.22	0.35	—	—	—	—	Unmarked state highway in Talbot County
MD 990	0.01	0.016	Spur from MD 177 near Jacobsville		—	—	
MD 991	0.02	0.032	Main Street Bridge over the Wicomico River in Salisbury		—	—	
MD 992	0.74	1.19	Spur from Hobbs Road near Salisbury		—	—	Longest section
MD 993	0.04	0.064	Spur from US 1 Alternate in Lansdowne		—	—	
MD 995	0.50	0.80	MD 170 near Hanover	BWI Rail Station	—	—	
MD 996	0.49	0.79	MD 191 near Bethesda	end of state maintenance near Tammy Court	—	1999	
MD 997	0.29	0.47	Morris Tongue Drive near Millersville	Jabez Run near Millersville	—	—	Longest section
MD 998	0.08	0.13	Spur from Star Point Lane in Burtonsville		—	—	
MD 999	0.24	0.39	Newport Road & Stewart Avenue	cul-de-sac	2001	2002	
