= Maryland Route 439 =

State highway in Maryland, United States

Maryland Route 439
- Old York Road
- Maryland Route 439 highlighted in red

Route information
- Maintained by MDSHA
- Length: 7.19 mi (11.57 km)
- Existed: 1930–present

Major junctions
- West end: MD 45 in Maryland Line
- I-83 in Maryland Line
- East end: MD 23 in Shawsville

Location
- Country: United States
- State: Maryland
- Counties: Baltimore, Harford

Highway system
- Maryland highway system; Interstate; US; State; Scenic Byways
← MD 436	→ MD 440

Maryland Route 439 (MD 439) is a state highway in the U.S. state of Maryland. Known as Old York Road, the state highway runs 7.19 miles (11.57 km) from MD 45 in Maryland Line east to MD 23 in Shawsville. In conjunction with MD 23 and Interstate 83 (I-83), MD 439 connects Bel Air with York, Pennsylvania. The state highway was constructed at both ends in the early 1930s. The middle section of MD 439 was brought into the state highway system around 1980.

== Route description ==
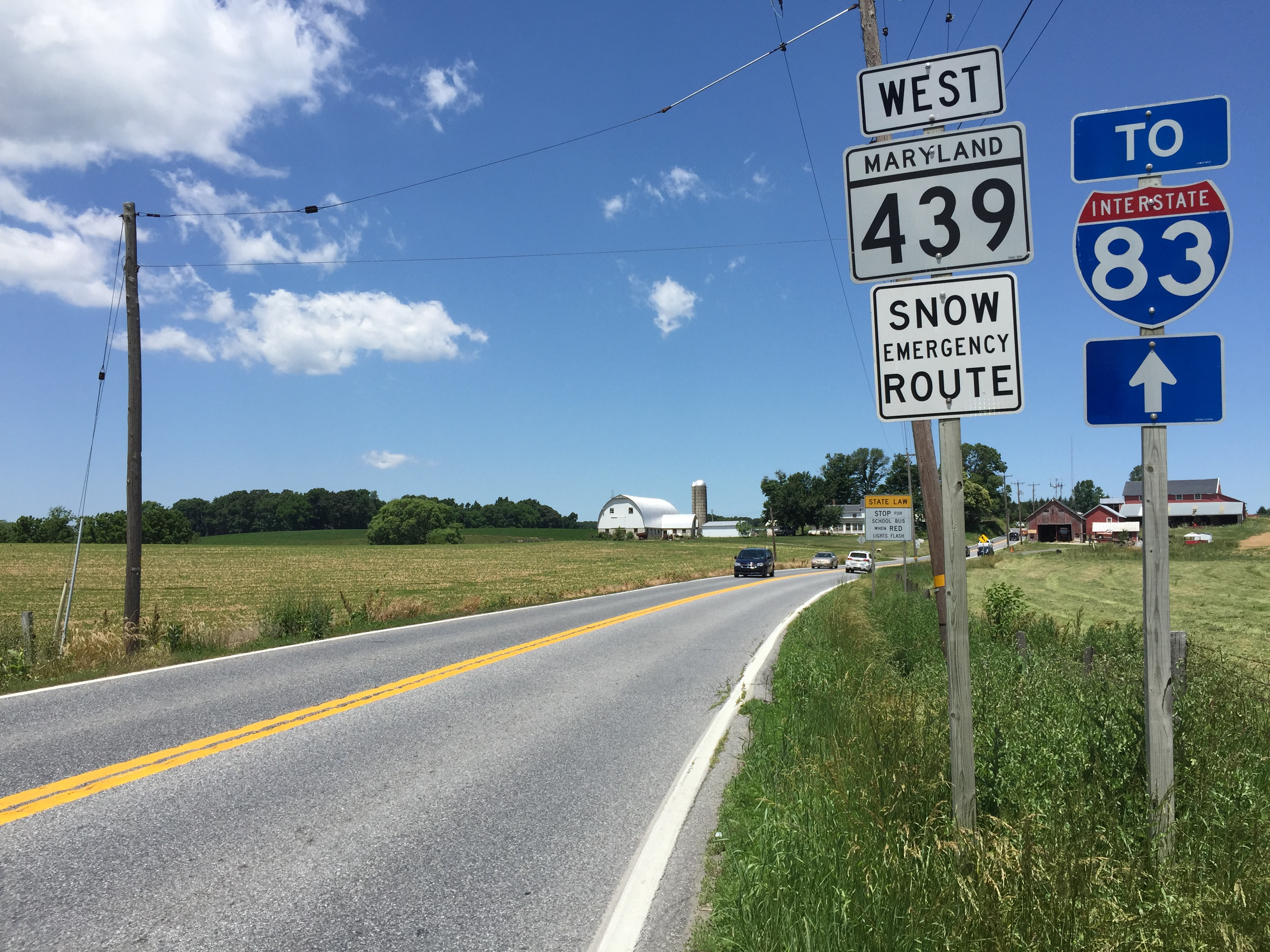
View west from the east end of MD 439 at MD 23 in Shawsville

MD 439 begins at an intersection with MD 45 (York Road) in Maryland Line a short distance south of the Pennsylvania state line. The state highway heads east as a two-lane undivided road through a four-ramp partial cloverleaf interchange with I-83 (Baltimore–Harrisburg Expressway). A park and ride lot is located at the southeast corner of this interchange. MD 439 heads southeast and passes through the hamlet of Shane as the highway follows the height of land between the drainage basins of Little Gunpowder Falls and Deer Creek. Shortly after crossing the Baltimore–Harford county line, the state highway reaches its eastern terminus at MD 23 (Norrisville Road) in Shawsville.

== History ==
Old York Road was an alternate, less-direct route for traffic between Towson and Maryland Lane compared to York Road. MD 439 is one of several extant stretches of the road; another segment is from south of Shawsville to MD 145 in Jacksonville, part of which is MD 562. MD 439 was paved as a state highway in two segments between 1930 and 1933: from York Road east to Lentz Road, and from the Baltimore–Harford county line east to MD 23. The state highway originally had an acute intersection with York Road north of the present terminal intersection. MD 439 was relocated when I-83 was completed from Parkton to the Pennsylvania state line in 1959. The state highway remained in pieces until the intervening section of Old York Road was brought under state maintenance around 1981.

== Junction list ==
County	Location	mi	km	Destinations	Notes
Baltimore	Maryland Line	0.00	0.00	MD 45 (York Road) – Parkton, Maryland Line	Western terminus
Baltimore	Maryland Line	0.24	0.39	I-83 (Baltimore–Harrisburg Expressway) – Baltimore, York	Exit 36 (I-83)
Harford	Shawsville	7.19	11.57	MD 23 (Norrisville Road) – Norrisville, Jarrettsville	Eastern terminus
1.000 mi = 1.609 km; 1.000 km = 0.621 mi
