= Maryland Route 562 =

State highway in Maryland, United States

Maryland Route 562

Route information
- Maintained by MDSHA
- Length: 1.39 mi (2.24 km)
- Existed: 1933–present

Major junctions
- South end: Markoe Road near Monkton
- North end: MD 138 near Monkton

Location
- Country: United States
- State: Maryland
- Counties: Baltimore

Highway system
- Maryland highway system; Interstate; US; State; Scenic Byways
← MD 561	→ MD 564

Maryland Route 562 (MD 562) is a state highway in the U.S. state of Maryland. The state highway runs 1.39 miles (2.24 km) from Markoe Road north to MD 138 near Monkton in northeastern Baltimore County. MD 562 was constructed in the early 1930s.

== Route description ==
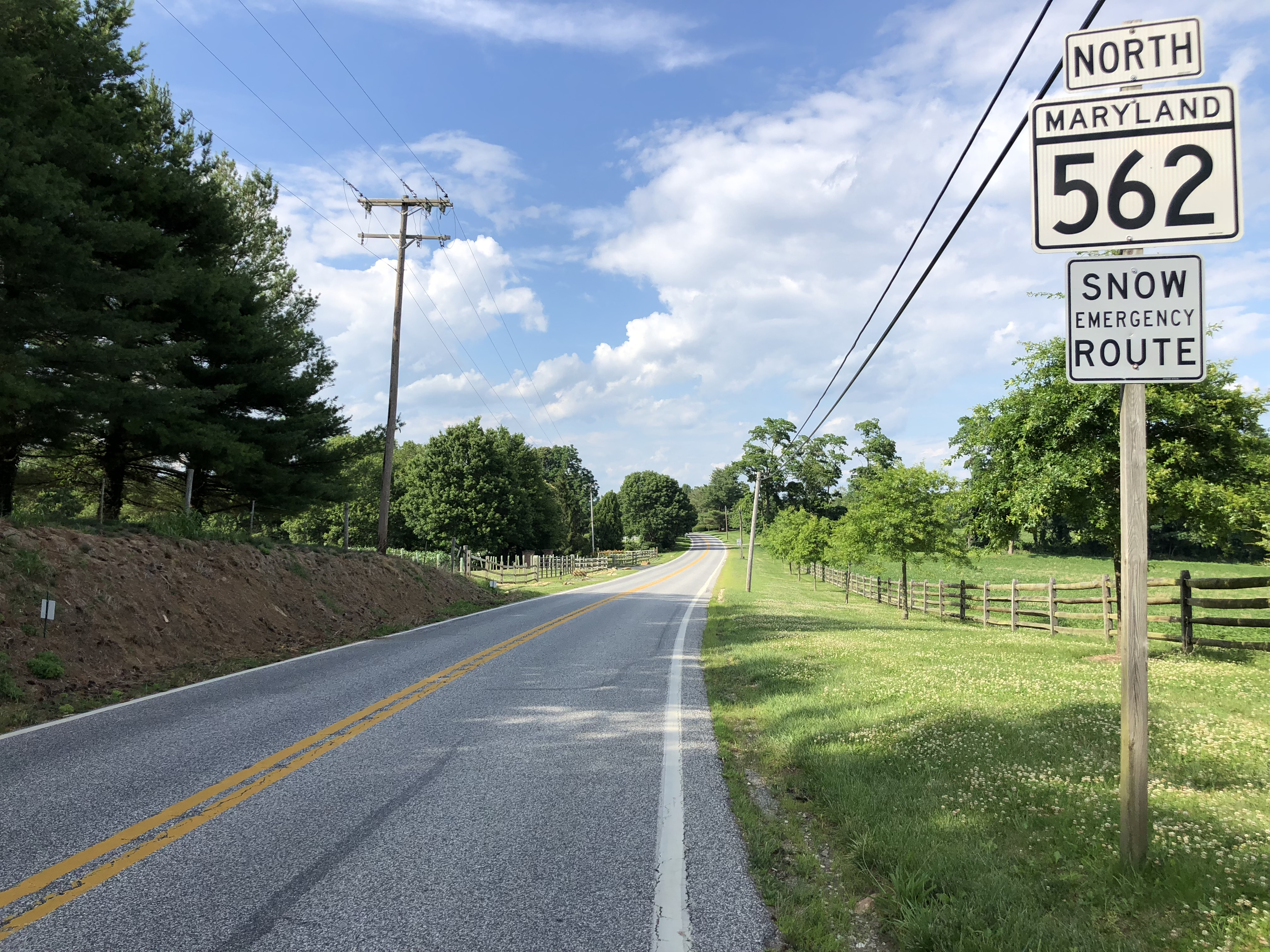
View north from the south end of MD 562 at Markoe Road near Monkton

MD 562 begins as Old York Road at its intersection with Markoe Road. Old York Road continues south as a county highway to MD 145 in Jacksonville. The two-lane undivided state highway heads north through farmland. MD 562 veers northwest onto Troyer Road as Old York Road continues north as a county highway toward MD 23 in Shawsville. The state highway reaches its terminus at a T-intersection with MD 138, which continues north as Troyer Road and heads west as Sheppards Road to the hamlet of Monkton.

== History ==
Old York Road was an alternate, less-direct route for traffic between Towson and Maryland Line compared to York Road, which is now MD 45. MD 562 is part of one extant stretch of the road; another segment is MD 439 from Shawsville to Maryland Line. The Troyer Road section of MD 562 was constructed as a concrete road in 1933. The Old York Road segment of MD 562 was built as a macadam road in 1934. The state highway has changed very little since the 1930s.

== Junction list ==
The entire route is in Monkton, Baltimore County.

mi	km	Destinations	Notes
0.00	0.00	Old York Road south / Markoe Road west	Southern terminus
0.65	1.05	Old York Road north	MD 562 veers north onto Troyer Road
1.39	2.24	MD 138 (Troyer Road/Sheppards Road) – Norrisville, Hereford	Northern terminus
1.000 mi = 1.609 km; 1.000 km = 0.621 mi
