= Maryland Route 138 =

State highway in Maryland, US

Maryland Route 138
- MD 138 highlighted in red

Route information
- Maintained by MDSHA
- Length: 9.24 mi (14.87 km)
- Existed: 1927–present
- Tourist routes: Horses and Hounds Scenic Byway

Major junctions
- West end: MD 45 in Hereford
- MD 562 in Shepperd
- East end: MD 23 near Shawsville

Location
- Country: United States
- State: Maryland
- Counties: Baltimore, Harford

Highway system
- Maryland highway system; Interstate; US; State; Scenic Byways
← MD 137	→ MD 139

Maryland Route 138 (MD 138) is a state highway in the U.S. state of Maryland. The state highway runs 9.24 miles (14.87 km) from MD 45 in Hereford east to MD 23 near Shawsville. MD 138 connects northern Baltimore County with northwestern Harford County via the community of Monkton on Gunpowder Falls. The first section of the state highway was built east of Monkton in the 1910s. The remainder of MD 138 was built west of Monkton in the mid-1920s and east of Monkton in the early to mid-1930s. The state highway through Monkton was maintained by Baltimore County from the late 1960s to the mid-1990s, during which the highway was relocated at Gunpowder Falls.

== Route description ==
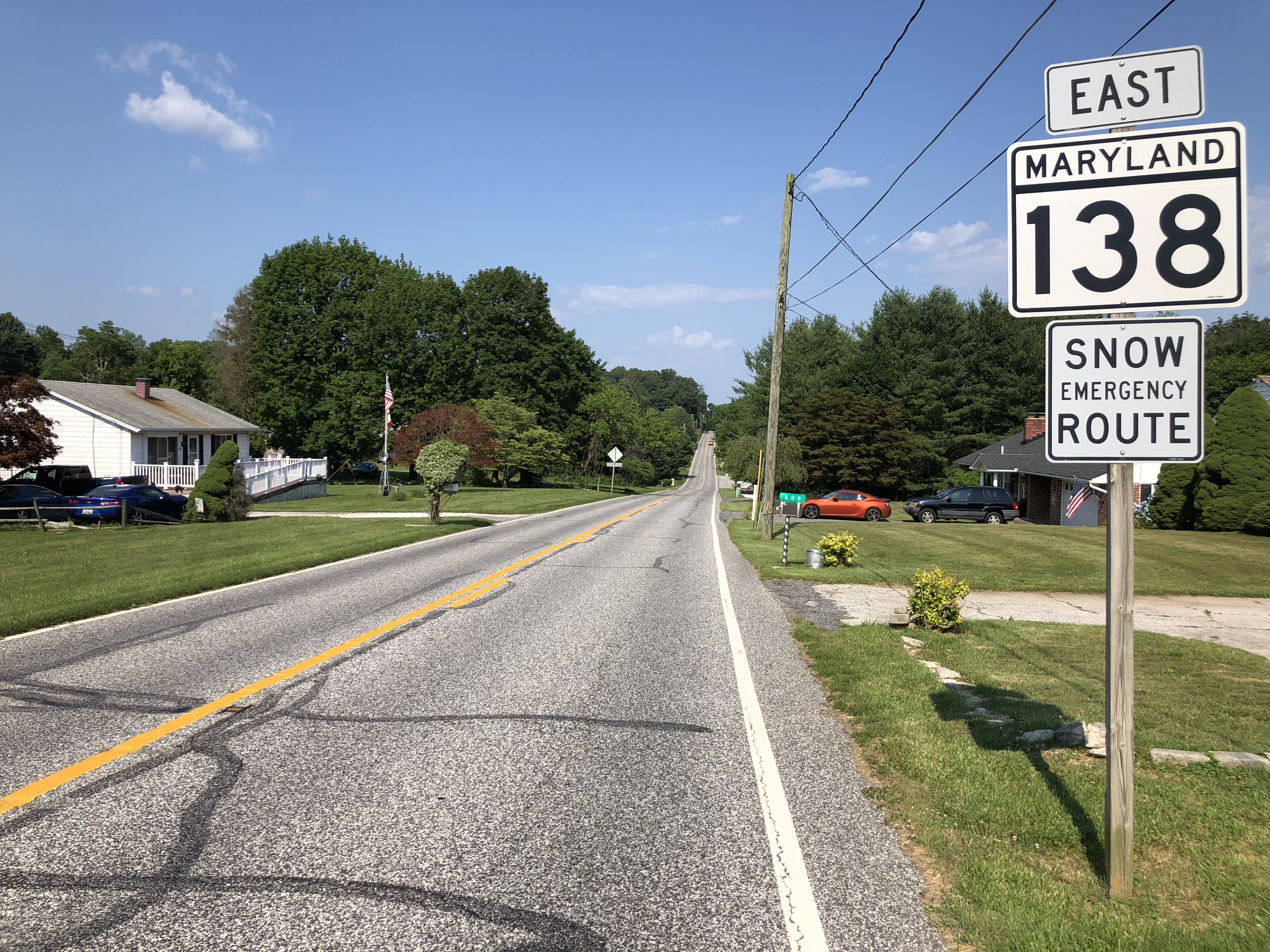
View east along MD 138 just east of MD 45 in Hereford

MD 138 begins at an intersection with MD 45 (York Road) in Hereford, one block south of MD 45's intersection with the eastern terminus of MD 137 (Mount Carmel Road). The state highway heads east as two-lane undivided Monkton Road to the village of Monkton, where the highway crosses Gunpowder Falls and the Torrey C. Brown Rail Trail. On the east edge of the village, Monkton Road splits to the southeast and MD 138 veers east onto Shepperd Road, following Charles Run upstream out of the valley. The state highway passes through the area patented in the 18th century as My Lady's Manor. In the hamlet of Shepperd, Shepperd Road ends at Troyer Road. MD 138 turns north onto Troyer Road and Troyer Road heads south as MD 562. The state highway passes through Troyer and curves along a ridge above the headwaters of Little Gunpowder Falls. MD 138 crosses the Baltimore–Harford county line and reaches its eastern terminus at MD 23 (Norrisville Road) in the hamlet of Blackhorse near Shawsville. Troyer Road continues east on the other side of the intersection as a county highway.

== History ==
The first section of pavement along modern MD 138 was built along Shepperd Road from Monkton to J.M. Pearce Road between 1915 and 1921. A concrete road was constructed from Hereford to just west of Gunpowder Falls between 1925 and 1927. The gap in the improved road through Monkton was filled in 1928 and a bridge for the Northern Central Railroad to cross over MD 138 was built shortly after 1930. The state highway from J.M. Pearce Road to Shepperd and along Troyer Road to the Harford County line was constructed between 1930 and 1932. The short portion of MD 138 in Harford County was completed in 1936.

MD 138 from just west of Gunpowder Falls through Monkton to east of Wesley Chapel Road was transferred from state to county maintenance in 1968. The county section of the highway was extended west to near Piney Hill Road in 1972. Baltimore County relocated the highway around and built a new bridge over Gunpowder Falls in 1975. The old highway followed what is now Old Monkton Road on either side of the river; east of the river, the highway had a right-angle turn at its railroad crossing. The gap in MD 138 was reduced to the section from just west of the new bridge to the Monkton Road – Shepperd Road intersection in 1987. MD 138 was united when that section was transferred to state maintenance in 1995.

== Junction list ==
County	Location	mi	km	Destinations	Notes
Baltimore	Hereford	0.00	0.00	MD 45 (York Road) to MD 137 (Mount Carmel Road) – Parkton, Cockeysville	Western terminus
Baltimore	Shepperd	6.12	9.85	MD 562 south (Troyer Road)	Northern terminus of MD 562
Harford	Shawsville	9.24	14.87	MD 23 (Norrisville Road) / Troyer Road east – Norrisville, Jarrettsville	Eastern terminus
1.000 mi = 1.609 km; 1.000 km = 0.621 mi
