= Shepperd, Maryland =

Unincorporated community in Maryland, United States

- Unincorporated community
- Location within Maryland
- Coordinates: 39°35′36″N 76°34′09″W
- Country: United States
- State: Maryland
- County: Baltimore
- Elevation: 653 ft (199 m)
- Time zone: UTC-5 (Eastern (EST))
  - Summer (DST): UTC-4 (EDT)
- Area codes: 410 & 443
- GNIS feature ID: 591270

Shepperd is an unincorporated community in Baltimore County, Maryland, United States. Shepperd is located at the junction of Maryland routes 138 and 562, 13.4 miles (21.6 km) north-northeast of Towson.
