= Maryland Route 371 =

State highway in Maryland, United States

Maryland Route 371
- Maryland Route 371 highlighted in red

Route information
- Maintained by MDSHA
- Length: 4.27 mi (6.87 km)
- Existed: 1930–present

Major junctions
- South end: Cedar Hall Wharf Road at Cedar Hall
- North end: Broad Street in Pocomoke City

Location
- Country: United States
- State: Maryland
- Counties: Worcester

Highway system
- Maryland highway system; Interstate; US; State; Scenic Byways
← MD 370	→ MD 372

Maryland Route 371 (MD 371) is a state highway in the U.S. state of Maryland. Known for most of its length as Cedar Hall Road, the state highway runs 4.27 miles (6.87 km) from Cedar Hall Wharf Road at Cedar Hall north to Broad Street in Pocomoke City. MD 371 was constructed in segments in the first half of the 1930s. The state highway, which serves the southwestern corner of Worcester County, has been isolated from the rest of the state highway system since the northern terminus was rolled back from U.S. Route 13 Business (US 13 Business) in the 1990s.

== Route description ==
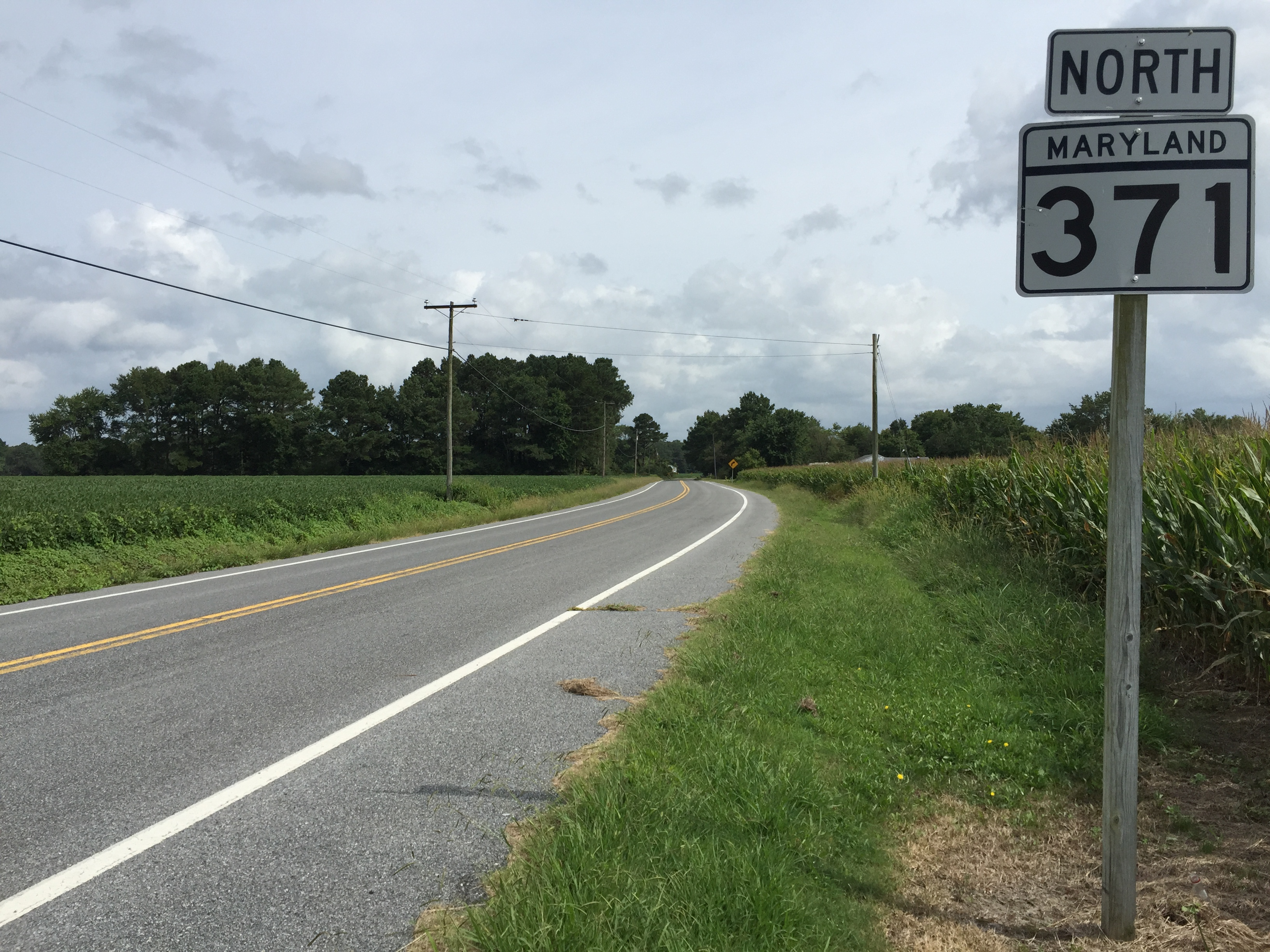
View north along MD 371 at Pocomoke Beltway in Pocomoke City

MD 371 begins at Cedar Hall, near the intersection with Colona Road. Cedar Hall Wharf Road continues south as a county highway to a boat ramp on the Pocomoke River. MD 371 heads northeast as a two-lane undivided road through farmland and forest. After the Pocomoke Beltway, which leads to US 13 and US 113, splits off to the east, the state highway turns north and passes Dun Swamp Road. Upon entering the city limits of Pocomoke City, the road's name changes to Second Street. MD 371 reaches its northern terminus at the intersection with Broad Street. Second Street continues north (east) as a municipal street toward US 13 Business.

== History ==
The first segment of MD 371 was paved in 1929 and 1930 from Pocomoke City to Hillman Road. The second segment, south to New Bridge Road, was built between 1930 and 1933. The final segment of MD 371 to Cedar Hall was constructed between 1934 and 1936. The state highway originally continued into Pocomoke City and ended at US 13 (later MD 675 and US 13 Business). The northern terminus was rolled back to Broad Street by 1999.

== Junction list ==
The entire route is in Worcester County.

Location	mi	km	Destinations	Notes
Cedar Hall	0.00	0.00	Cedar Hall Wharf Road south	Southern terminus
Pocomoke City	3.11	5.01	Pocomoke Beltway east to US 13 / US 113 – Princess Anne, Snow Hill, Norfolk	
Pocomoke City	4.27	6.87	Broad Street south / Second Street east to US 13 Bus.	Northern terminus
1.000 mi = 1.609 km; 1.000 km = 0.621 mi
