= Maryland Line (disambiguation) =

The Maryland Line were the Continental Army regiments from Maryland in the American Revolutionary War.

Maryland Line can also refer to the following:

- Maryland Line (CSA), Maryland volunteers who fought for the Confederate States of America during the American Civil War
- Maryland Line, Maryland, a community
- Maryland Line (Washington), D.C., United States, now the Route 82 and P6 buses of the Pennsylvania Avenue Line
