= Madonna, Maryland =

Unincorporated community in Maryland, United States

- Unincorporated community
- Location within Maryland Location within the United States
- Coordinates: 39°36′47″N 76°30′59″W
- Country: United States
- State: Maryland
- County: Harford
- Elevation: 748 ft (228 m)
- Time zone: UTC-5 (Eastern (EST))
  - Summer (DST): UTC-4 (EDT)
- Area codes: 410 & 443
- GNIS feature ID: 590719

Madonna is an unincorporated community in Harford County, Maryland, United States. Madonna is located at the junction of Maryland routes 23 and 146, 10.5 miles (16.9 km) west-northwest of Bel Air.
