= Maryland Route 23 =

State highway in Harford County, Maryland, US

Maryland Route 23
- Maryland Route 23 highlighted in red

Route information
- Maintained by MDSHA
- Length: 20.58 mi (33.12 km)
- Existed: 1927–present
- Tourist routes: Mason and Dixon Scenic Byway

Major junctions
- East end: US 1 in Hickory
- MD 24 in Forest Hill; MD 165 in Jarrettsville; MD 146 in Madonna; MD 138 near Shawsville; MD 439 in Shawsville; MD 136 in Norrisville
- North end: PA 24 near Norrisville

Location
- Country: United States
- State: Maryland
- Counties: Harford

Highway system
- Maryland highway system; Interstate; US; State; Scenic Byways
← MD 22	→ MD 24

Maryland Route 23 (MD 23) is a state highway in the U.S. state of Maryland. The state highway runs 20.58 miles (33.12 km) from U.S. Route 1 (US 1) in Hickory north and west to the Pennsylvania state line near Norrisville, where the highway continues as Pennsylvania Route 24 (PA 24). MD 23 is an L-shaped highway in northwestern Harford County that consists of two major sections. Between US 1 and MD 165 in Jarrettsville, MD 23 is marked east–west along a two-lane road with partial control of access named East–West Highway. From MD 165 to the state line, the state highway is marked north–south along Norrisville Road, a rural two-lane highway that passes through the villages of Madonna and Shawsville. The two sections of MD 23 are connected by a short concurrency with MD 165.

MD 23 from Hickory to Jarrettsville was one of the original state highways marked for improvement by the Maryland State Roads Commission in 1909 and one of the original state-numbered highways in 1927. The state road was constructed from Hickory to Jarrettsville and from Norrisville to the state line in the early to mid-1910s. The gaps between Jarrettsville and Shawsville and from Shawsville to Norrisville were filled in the early 1920s. East–West Highway was constructed in the early 1960s to replace the parallel Jarrettsville Road. MD 23's eastern terminus was moved to US 1's new bypass of Hickory in 2000.

== Route description ==
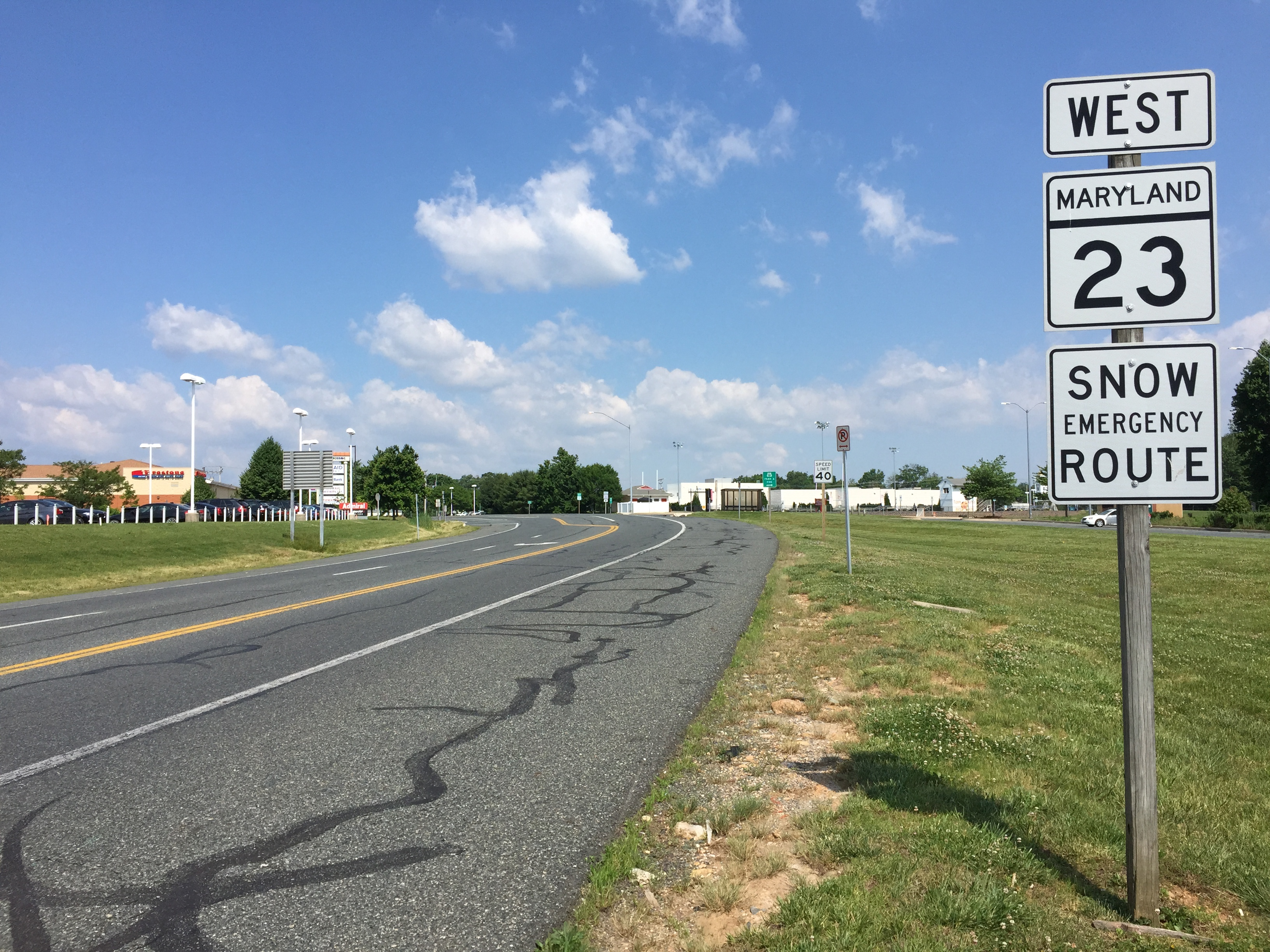
View west from the east end of MD 23 at US 1 in Hickory

MD 23 begins at an intersection with US 1 (Hickory Bypass) in Hickory. The state highway heads west as two-lane undivided East–West Highway, passing south of a park and ride lot serving MTA Maryland commuter buses. MD 23 passes through a commercial area where the highway intersects US 1 Business (Conowingo Road) and Water Tower Way before the road passes through a narrow forested corridor. The state highway intersects Commerce Road at a roundabout; Commerce Road heads north into an industrial park surrounding Forest Hill Airport. After crossing over Bynum Run and the Ma and Pa Trail, a rail trail along the abandoned right-of-way of the Maryland and Pennsylvania Railroad, MD 23 intersects MD 24 (Rocks Road/Rock Spring Road) just south of Forest Hill. MD 23 continues west through a mix of farmland and forest, passing south of the hamlet of Fairview and crossing over Phillips Mill Road and Morse Road before East–West Highway reaches its western terminus at MD 165 (Baldwin Mill Road) south of Jarrettsville.

MD 23 turns north and joins MD 165 in a concurrency to the center of Jarrettsville. MD 165 continues north as Federal Hill Road and MD 23 turns west onto Norrisville Road; the east leg of the intersection is Jarrettsville Road. MD 23 heads west through farmland and intersects MD 146 (Jarrettsville Pike) and Madonna Road in the village of Madonna. The state highway gradually curves to the north through Shawsville, where MD 23 intersects two highways that head west into Baltimore County, MD 138 (Troyer Road) and MD 439 (Old York Road). The state highway makes a sharp, curvaceous descent to a crossing of Deer Creek, next to which is the historic Ivory Mills complex located east of the road. MD 23 ascends out of the forested creek valley into Norrisville and meets the north end of MD 136 (Harkins Road). The state highway continues north to just south of the Pennsylvania state line. MD 23 turns west and closely parallels the state line for about 2,000 feet (610 m) before the highway veers northwest to cross the border. The highway continues north as PA 24 (Barrens Road) toward the borough of Stewartstown.

MD 23 is a part of the National Highway System as a principal arterial from US 1 in Hickory west to High Point Road west of Forest Hill.

== History ==
The first section of MD 23 to be paved was the part of the Old York Turnpike from MD 138 to MD 439, which was improved as a 12-foot-wide (3.7 m) macadam state-aid road by 1910. The portion of MD 23 from Hickory to Jarrettsville was designated one of the original state roads by the Maryland State Roads Commission in 1909. The state road was constructed with a 14-foot-wide (4.3 m) macadam surface from Hickory to Grafton Shop Road in 1910, from Morse Road to Jarrettsville in 1914, and between Grafton Shop Road and Morse Road in 1915. Another section of 12-foot-wide (3.7 m) macadam road was constructed under state aid from south of Norrisville to the Pennsylvania state line by 1915. The highway from Jarrettsville to MD 138 was under construction as a concrete road by 1919 and completed in 1921. The final portion of MD 23, also paved in concrete, was completed from MD 439 to south of Norrisville in 1923. MD 23 was one of the original state-numbered highways designated by the roads commission in 1927. The state highway was widened to a width of 20 feet (6.1 m) from Hickory to Jarrettsville by 1930.

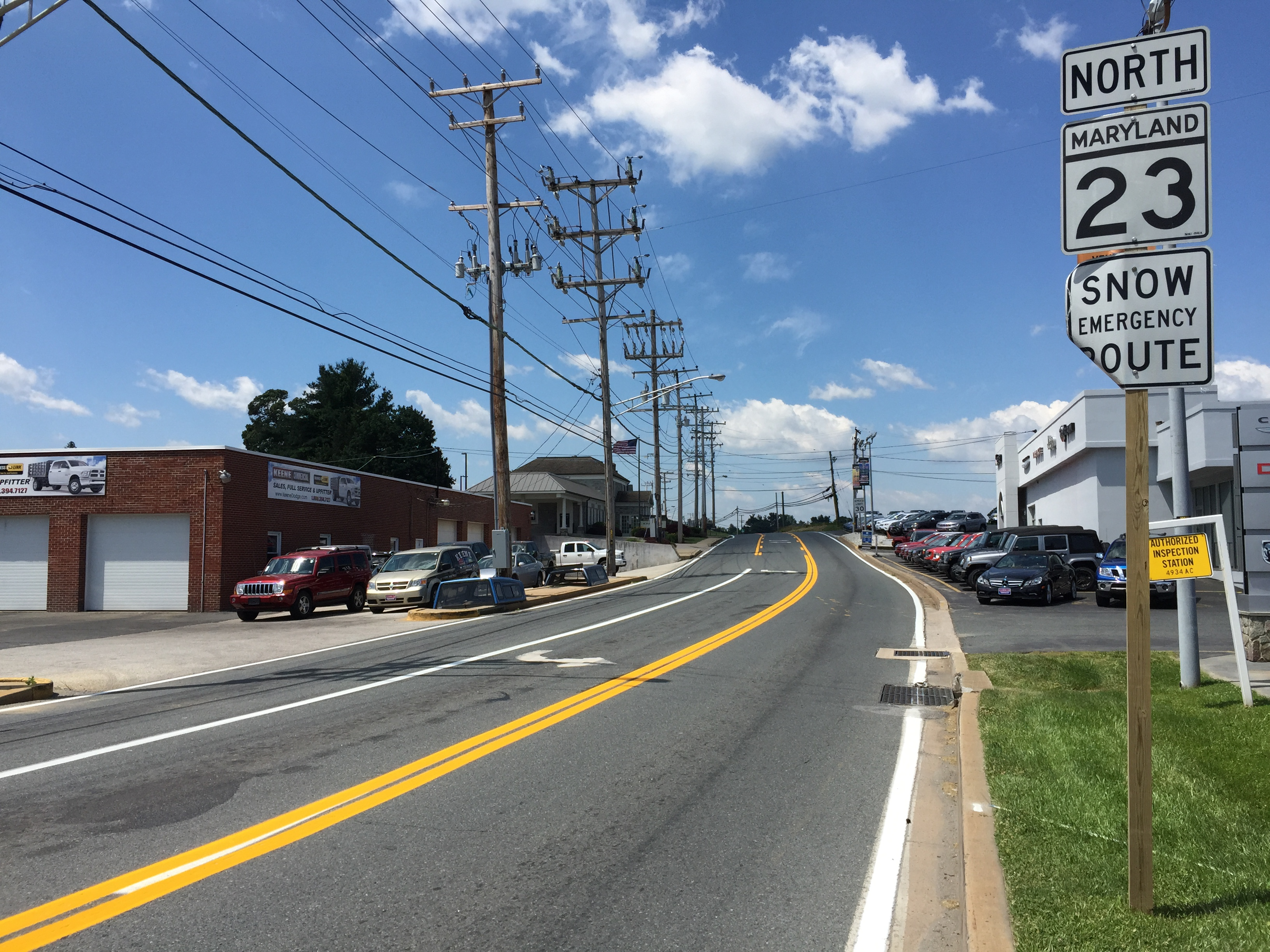
MD 23 north of MD 165 in Jarrettsville

Jarrettsville Road was replaced by East–West Highway, which was under construction by 1961 and completed in 1963. The MD 23 designation was moved to the new highway and Jarrettsville Road was immediately transferred to county maintenance. At its eastern end, East–West Highway was constructed to tie into the Bel Air Bypass that was completed in 1965 and was proposed to continue to east of Hickory. Close to its eastern end, MD 23 curved south to an intersection with Granary Road. MD 23 turned east onto Granary Road for its eastern terminus at US 1 (now US 1 Business). East–West Highway continued south as MD 23A; at Bynum Road, MD 23A became a one-lane ramp that joined the Bel Air Bypass. In 2000, the Hickory Bypass was completed; US 1 was moved to the new bypass and US 1 Business was extended along US 1's old route through Hickory. As part of the same project, MD 23 was extended east to a new terminus at the Hickory Bypass. East–West Highway's curve to the south was replaced with a perpendicular intersection with MD 23A, which was renamed Water Tower Way, extended north to new MD 23, and gained a ramp from northbound US 1 at its southern end. The portion of Granary Road that formed MD 23's terminus was designated MD 23B. Both MD 23A and MD 23B were transferred to Harford County maintenance in 2002. MD 23's roundabout at Commerce Road in Forest Hill was constructed in 2008.

== Junction list ==
MD 23 is signed east–west east of MD 165 and north–south west of MD 165. The entire route is in Harford County.

Location	mi	km	Destinations	Notes
Hickory	0.00	0.00	US 1 (Hickory Bypass) – Baltimore, Rising Sun	Eastern terminus
Hickory	0.22	0.35	US 1 Bus. (Conowingo Road) – Bel Air	
Forest Hill	2.00	3.22	MD 24 (Rocks Road/Rock Spring Road) – Bel Air, Pylesville	
Jarrettsville	6.81	10.96	MD 165 south (Baldwin Mill Road) – Baldwin	South end of concurrency with MD 165
Jarrettsville	8.09	13.02	MD 165 north (Federal Hill Road) / Jarrettsville Road east – Pylesville, Forest Hill	North end of concurrency with MD 165; Jarrettsville Road is old alignment of MD 23
Madonna	10.44	16.80	MD 146 south (Jarrettsville Pike) / Madonna Road north – Jacksonville	Northern terminus of MD 146
Shawsville	12.66	20.37	MD 138 west (Troyer Road) / Troyer Road east – Monkton	Eastern terminus of MD 138
Shawsville	13.88	22.34	MD 439 west (Old York Road) to I-83 – Maryland Line	Eastern terminus of MD 439
Norrisville	18.58	29.90	MD 136 east (Harkins Road) – Whiteford	Western terminus of MD 136
Norrisville	20.58	33.12	PA 24 north (Barrens Road) – Stewartstown	Pennsylvania state line; northern terminus
1.000 mi = 1.609 km; 1.000 km = 0.621 mi: Concurrency terminus

== Auxiliary routes ==
MD 23 previously had two auxiliary routes.

- MD 23A was the designation for the portion of East–West Highway between Granary Road and the ramp to southbound US 1 (Bel Air Bypass). The 0.38-mile (0.61 km) state highway was constructed in 1963 as a connection between MD 23 and southbound US 1. In 2000, MD 23A was extended north to the new MD 23 and a ramp from northbound US 1 to MD 23A was added. The highway had a new length of 0.53 miles (0.85 km) and was renamed Water Tower Way. MD 23A was removed from the state highway system in 2002.
- MD 23B was the designation for the 0.16-mile (0.26 km) section of Granary Road between US 1 Business and MD 23A (Water Tower Way) that was part of MD 23 from the construction of East–West Highway in 1963 until 2000. MD 23B was assigned in 2000 and removed from the state system in 2002.
