= Cedar Hall, Maryland =

Unincorporated community in Maryland, United States

- Unincorporated community
- Location within Maryland
- Coordinates: 38°01′12″N 75°36′35″W
- Country: United States
- State: Maryland
- County: Worcester
- Elevation: 7 ft (2.1 m)
- Time zone: UTC-5 (Eastern (EST))
  - Summer (DST): UTC-4 (EDT)
- ZIP code: 21851
- Area codes: 410, 443, and 667
- GNIS feature ID: 583648

Cedar Hall is an unincorporated community in Worcester County, Maryland, United States. Cedar Hall is located in the southwestern corner of the county along the Pocomoke River.
