= Shawsville, Maryland =

Unincorporated community in Maryland, United States

- Unincorporated community
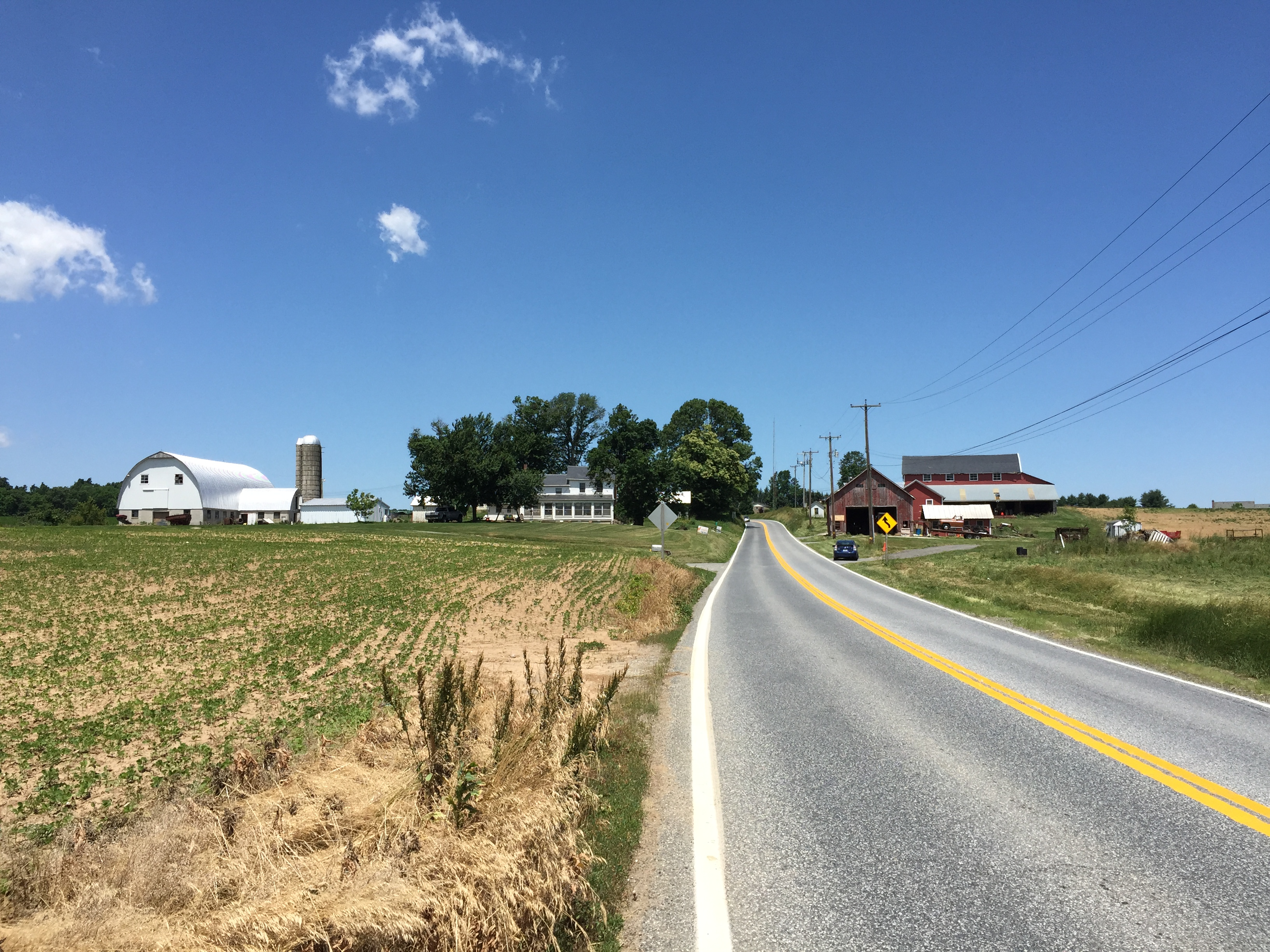
- A farm in Shawsville

- Location within Maryland Location within the United States
- Coordinates: 39°38′16″N 76°33′18″W
- Country: United States
- State: Maryland
- County: Harford
- Elevation: 650 ft (200 m)
- Time zone: UTC-5 (Eastern (EST))
  - Summer (DST): UTC-4 (EDT)
- Area codes: 410 & 443
- GNIS feature ID: 591268

Shawsville is an unincorporated community in Harford County, Maryland, United States. Shawsville is located on Maryland Route 23, 13.1 miles (21.1 km) west-northwest of Bel Air.
