= Norrisville, Maryland =

Unincorporated community in Maryland, U.S.

Coordinates: 39°42′17″N 76°32′05″W

Norrisville is an unincorporated community in Harford County, Maryland, United States, located just south of the Pennsylvania state line in the extreme northwest section of the county. It is primarily a farming community full of rolling hills and small valleys, and is part of the Deer Creek watershed. The area is served by two state roads, Maryland routes 23 and 136. A demographic profile estimates that the Norrisville area had a population of 2,931 as of 2000. It lies at an elevation of 741 feet (226 m). Norrisville is part of the White Hall zip code 21161, whose post office is located just over the Baltimore County line.

== History ==
Norrisville was founded by the father of Edward Norris. Norris owned 3,000 acres (1,200 ha) of land in the area.
