= Maryland Line, Maryland =

- Unincorporated town
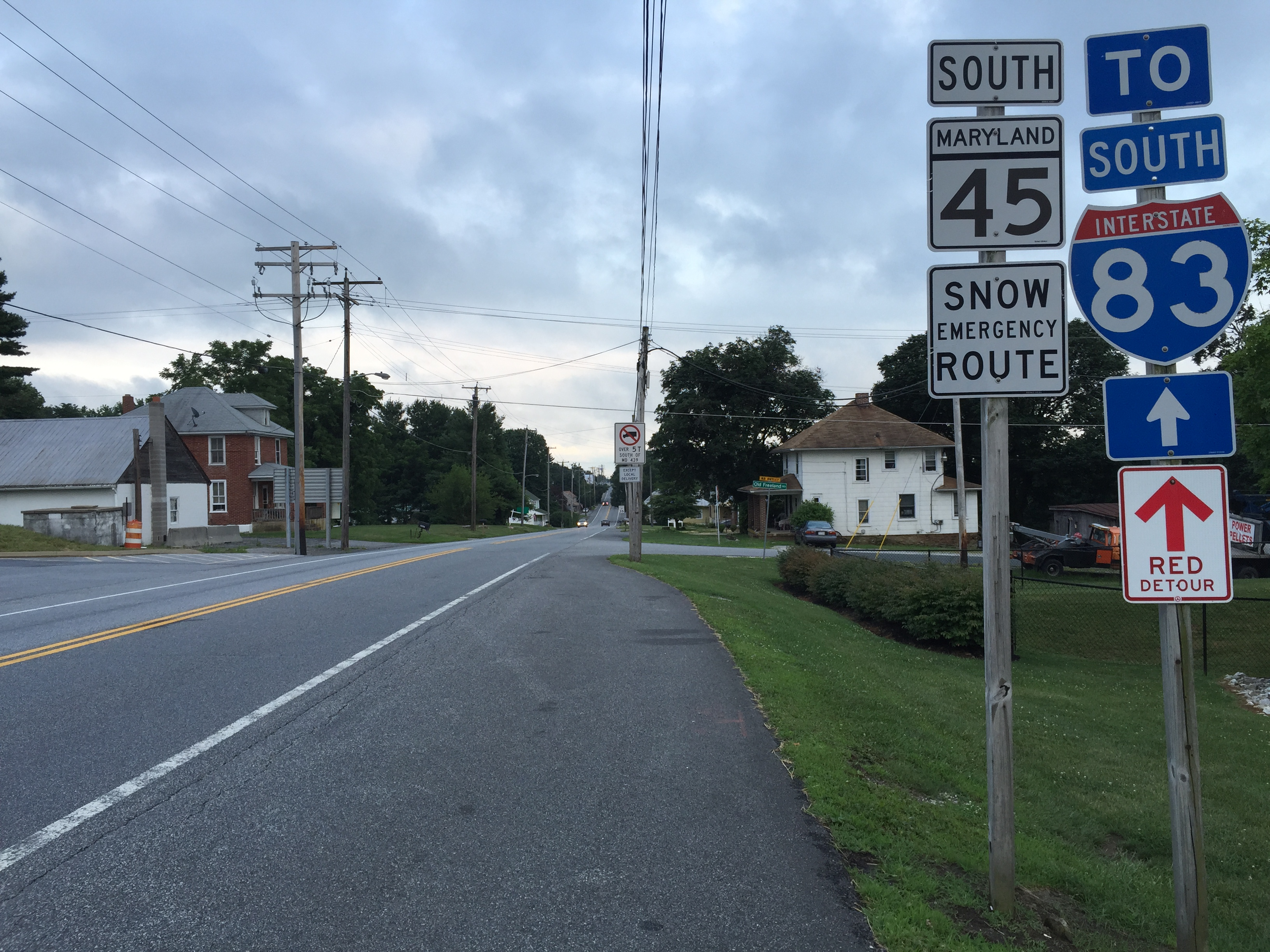
- View south along MD 45 entering Maryland Line

- Location within the State of Maryland Maryland Line (the United States)
- Coordinates: 39°42′51″N 76°39′14″W
- Country: United States
- State: Maryland
- County: Baltimore
- Time zone: UTC-5 (Eastern (EST))
  - Summer (DST): UTC-4 (EDT)
- ZIP code: 21105

Maryland Line is an unincorporated town in Baltimore County, Maryland, United States, located just south of the Mason–Dixon line below York County, Pennsylvania. It is accessible via exits 36 and 37 from I-83. In the 19th century, the community was known as "New Market," but the name was changed to avoid confusion with a town in Frederick County bearing the same name.
