= Maryland Route 20 =

State highway in Kent County, Maryland, US

Maryland Route 20
- Maryland Route 20 highlighted in red

Route information
- Maintained by MDSHA
- Length: 13.77 mi (22.16 km)
- Existed: 1927–present
- Tourist routes: Chesapeake Country Scenic Byway

Major junctions
- West end: Beach Road / Lawton Avenue in Rock Hall
- MD 445 in Rock Hall; MD 288 in Rock Hall; MD 21 near Fairlee; MD 298 at Fairlee; MD 446 near Chestertown; MD 514 in Chestertown; MD 291 in Chestertown
- East end: High Street in Chestertown

Location
- Country: United States
- State: Maryland
- Counties: Kent

Highway system
- Maryland highway system; Interstate; US; State; Scenic Byways
← MD 19	→ MD 21

Maryland Route 20 (MD 20) is a state highway in the U.S. state of Maryland. The highway runs 13.77 miles (22.16 km) from Beach Road and Lawton Avenue in Rock Hall east to MD 291 in Chestertown. MD 20 connects Chestertown with several villages in western Kent County, including Fairlee. The highway was designated one of the original state roads to be improved by the Maryland State Roads Commission in 1909 and was built between the mid-1910s and early 1920s. MD 20 was widened in the late 1940s and received bypasses of Fairlee and in Rock Hall in the mid-1950s and late 1950s, respectively. The highway was removed from the center of Chestertown in the mid-1980s.

== Route description ==
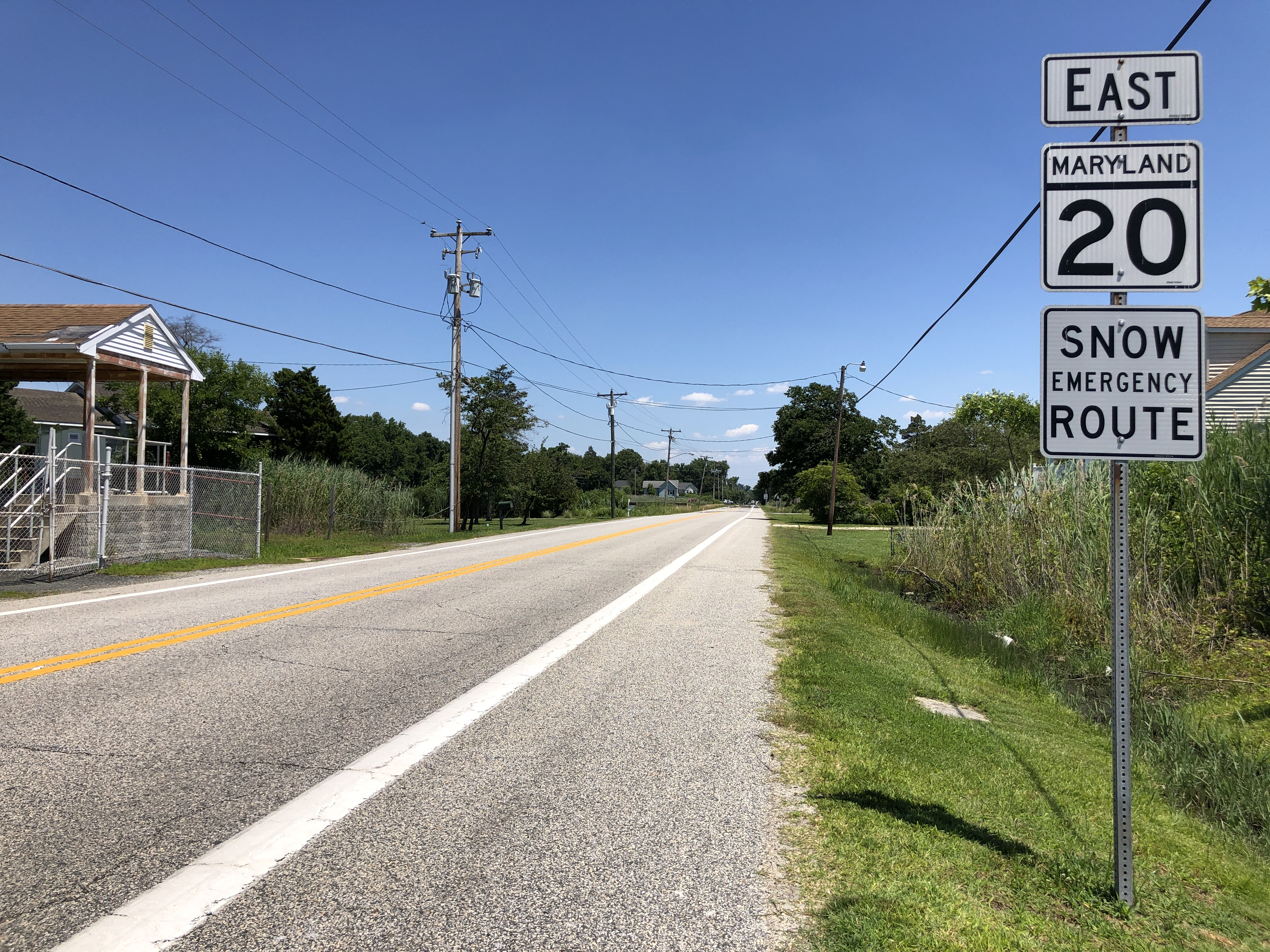
View east along MD 20 at the western terminus in Rock Hall

MD 20 begins at an intersection with Beach Road and Lawton Avenue just east of where Swan Creek empties into the Chesapeake Bay in the town of Rock Hall. The highway heads east as two-lane undivided Rock Hall Avenue between a pair of harbors: The Haven to the north and Rock Hall Harbor to the south. MD 20 intersects MD 445 (Main Street) on the north end of downtown and gains a center left-turn lane between there and the east town limit at Grays Inn Creek. East of the creek, the highway's name becomes Rock Hall Road, and it meets the eastern end of MD 674 (Sharp Street) and the north end of MD 288 (Crosby Road). MD 20 heads northeast through the hamlet of Edesville and crosses Shipyard Creek. The highway passes to the west of St. Paul's Church, which is accessed via Ricauds Branch Road or Sandy Bottom Road; opposite the latter county highway is the eastern end of MD 21 (Tolchester Beach Road).

MD 20 continues north toward Fairlee, which the highway bypasses to the southeast between intersections with the western end of MD 298 (Fairlee Road) and Old Fairlee Road. The highway continues east as Chestertown Road, which meets the northern end of MD 446 (Broad Neck Road) and crosses over the East Fork Branch of Langford Creek. MD 20 passes the historic homes Brampton located to the south and Lauretum located to the north before it intersects the southern end of MD 514 (Flatland Road) immediately before it enters the town of Chestertown at Radcliffe Creek. The highway curves southeast past the Radcliffe Mill and comes to a roundabout junction with the western end of MD 291 (Morgnec Road), which leads to MD 213, beyond which MD 20 reaches its eastern terminus. The road continues southeast as High Street toward the Chestertown Historic District.

== History ==
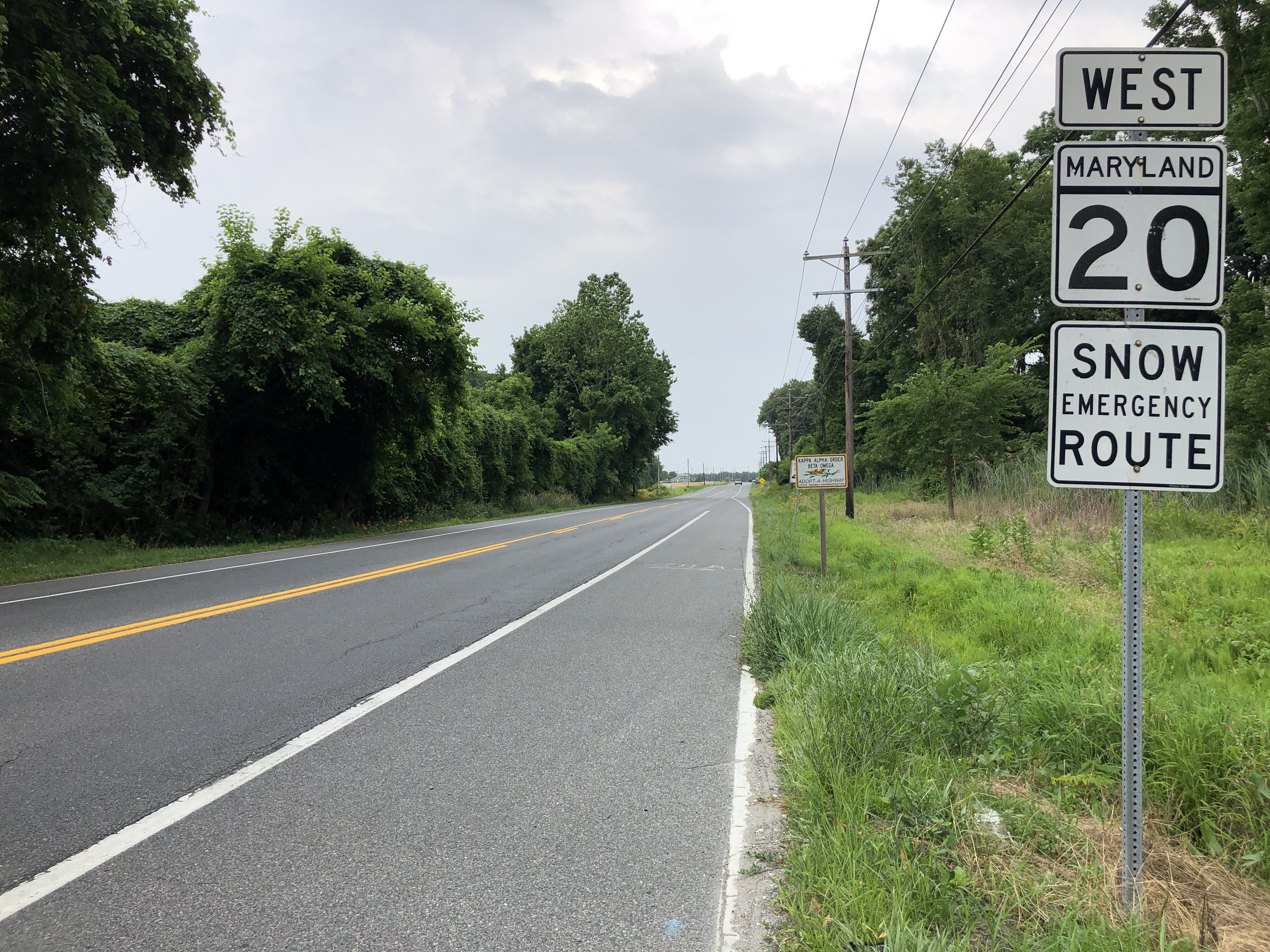
MD 20 westbound past MD 514 in Chestertown

The Chestertown–Rock Hall highway was one of the roads the Maryland State Roads Commission designated for improvement in 1909, but by 1915 the highway was not deemed an essential part of the main system. The highway from Fairlee to near Broad Neck Road was paved as a 14-foot-wide (4.3 m) macadam road in 1915. The gap between Fairlee and Chestertown was filled when a concrete road was built from near Broad Neck Road to College Avenue in Chestertown and along Spring Avenue between High Street and Maple Avenue in 1917 and 1918. In addition, concrete road was constructed from Fairlee to Edesville in 1918. The highway from Edesville to Rock Hall was under construction by 1920 and completed by 1921. The Edesville–Rock Hall segment, which followed Sharp Street and Main Street in the town of Rock Hall, was built of concrete except for near the Rock Hall–Bay Shore ferry, which was built with macadam to allow ferry traffic to use the highway during construction. As early as 1923 and late as 1928, a ferry connected Rock Hall with Bay Shore Park near Fort Howard in Baltimore County, thus briefly and indirectly connecting this MD 20 with the former MD 20 in Baltimore County.

MD 20 was widened and resurfaced with bituminous concrete from Chestertown to Rock Hall in 1947 and 1948. Spring Avenue in Chestertown was resurfaced with bituminous concrete in 1950, and MD 20's bridge across Radcliffe Creek was replaced that year and 1951. MD 20's bypass of Fairlee was constructed in 1953; the bypassed segments became a southern extension of MD 298 and MD 298A on Old Fairlee Road. The highway bypassed the center of Rock Hall when Rock Hall Avenue from MD 445 to Sharp Street just east of town was built in 1959 and 1960, leaving behind MD 674 on Sharp Street. MD 20 was reconstructed from MD 288 to MD 298, including eliminating a curve, in 1976. MD 20 was reconstructed from Radcliffe Creek to the MD 291 junction when the latter highway was extended west to its present terminus in 1968 and 1969. The MD 20 portion of High Street from MD 291 to College Avenue was reconstructed in 1979. The portions of MD 20 on High Street from MD 291 to College Avenue and on Spring Avenue were transferred from state to municipal maintenance through an August 27, 1985, road transfer agreement. The portion of High Street from College Avenue to Spring Avenue had already been municipally maintained. In 2014, a roundabout was constructed at the MD 20–MD 291 junction.

== Junction list ==
The entire route is in Kent County.

Location	mi	km	Destinations	Notes
Rock Hall	0.00	0.00	Beach Road south / Lawton Avenue north	Western terminus
Rock Hall	1.38	2.22	MD 445 (Main Street) – Tolchester	
Rock Hall	1.88	3.03	MD 674 west (Sharp Street)	Eastern terminus of MD 674
Rock Hall	2.03	3.27	MD 288 east (Crosby Road)	Western terminus of MD 288
Fairlee	6.60	10.62	MD 21 west (Tolchester Beach Road) – Tolchester	Eastern terminus of MD 21
Fairlee	7.93	12.76	MD 298 east (Fairlee Road) – Still Pond, Galena	Western terminus of MD 298
	11.60	18.67	MD 446 south (Broad Neck Road) – Langford, Broadneck	Northern terminus of MD 446
Chestertown	13.55	21.81	MD 514 north (Flatland Road)	Southern terminus of MD 514
Chestertown	13.71	22.06	MD 291 east (Morgnec Road) to MD 213 – Millington, Galena, Church Hill	Roundabout; western terminus of MD 291
Chestertown	13.77	22.16	High Street south	Eastern terminus; continuation beyond MD 291
1.000 mi = 1.609 km; 1.000 km = 0.621 mi
