= Maryland Route 445 =

State highway in Maryland, United States

Maryland Route 445
- Maryland Route 445 highlighted in red

Route information
- Maintained by MDSHA
- Length: 11.96 mi (19.25 km)
- Existed: 1930–present
- Tourist routes: Chesapeake Country Scenic Byway

Major junctions
- South end: Eastern Neck Island
- MD 20 in Rock Hall
- North end: MD 21 near Tolchester Beach

Location
- Country: United States
- State: Maryland
- Counties: Kent

Highway system
- Maryland highway system; Interstate; US; State; Scenic Byways
← MD 444	→ MD 446

Maryland Route 445 (MD 445) is a state highway in the U.S. state of Maryland. The highway runs 11.96 miles (19.25 km) from Eastern Neck Island in the southwest corner of Kent County north to MD 21 near Tolchester Beach. MD 445 connects Tolchester Beach and Eastern Neck Island with Rock Hall, where the highway intersects MD 20. The first piece of MD 445 was constructed as part of MD 20 around 1920. The remainder of the highway was built around 1930. MD 445 was reconstructed in the mid-1960s and early to mid-1970s.

== Route description ==
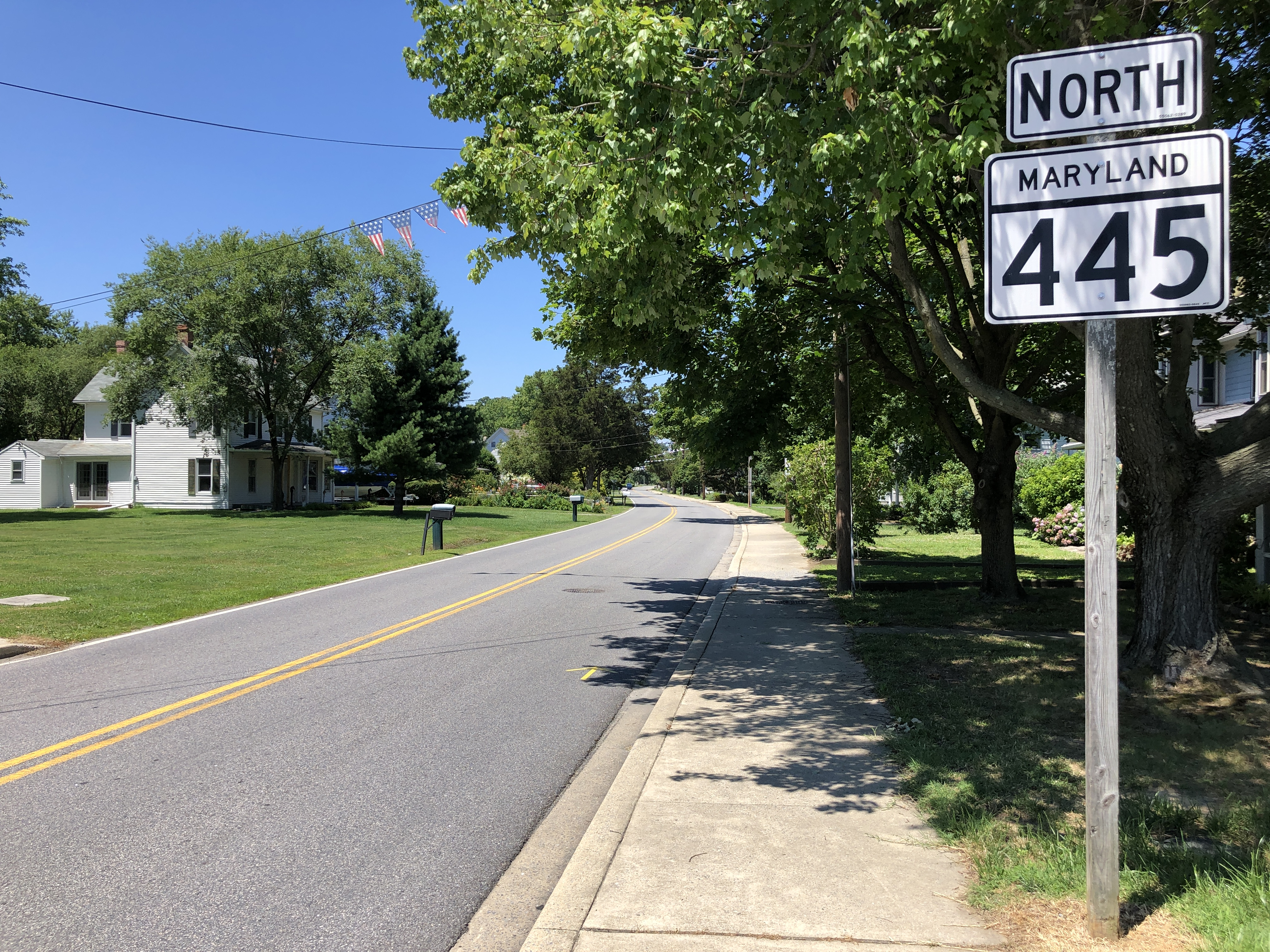
View north along MD 445 at MD 20 in Rock Hall

MD 445 begins as Eastern Neck Road at the north end of the bridge that connects the mainland with Eastern Neck Island, an island on the north side of the mouth of the Chester River that comprises the southernmost land in Kent County. Eastern Neck Road continues south as a county highway through the Eastern Neck National Wildlife Refuge. MD 445 heads north as a two-lane undivided road along Eastern Neck parallel to the shore of the Chesapeake Bay, along which the highway passes the historic home Trumpington. The highway's name changes to Main Street on entering the town of Rock Hall. Within the town, MD 445 intersects Sharp Street and MD 20 (Rock Hall Avenue). North of Rock Hall Ball Park, the highway leaves the town and continues as Tolchester Road. MD 445 crosses a tributary to and the main course of Swan Creek and passes the historic home Hinchingham before reaching its northern terminus at Tolchester Beach Road near Tolchester Beach. Tolchester Beach Road heads west as a county highway toward the beach community and east as MD 21; the north leg of the intersection is Bay Shore Road.

== History ==
The first part of modern MD 445 to be built was Main Street between Sharp Street and Rock Hall Avenue, which was constructed as a concrete street as part of MD 20 in 1920. The remainder of MD 445 was one of several state highways whose construction as 9-and-16-foot-wide (2.7 and 4.9 m) concrete roads was partially funded by a $900,000 Kent County bond issue in 1929. The highway was built from 0.79 miles (1.27 km) north of the Eastern Neck Island bridge to MD 21 in 1929 and 1930. The remainder of the highway to the north end of the bridge to the island was started in 1930 and completed by 1933. Main Street was widened and resurfaced with bituminous concrete in 1947 and 1948. MD 20 was removed from Main Street after the portion of Rock Hall Avenue between MD 445 and MD 674 was constructed in 1959 and 1960. MD 445 was reconstructed from Rock Hall to Swan Creek in 1966 and from Swan Creek to MD 21 in 1974 and 1975. The highway from Eastern Neck Island to Sharp Street was resurfaced with bituminous concrete in 1972, and Main Street in Rock Hall was reconstructed in a streetscape project in 2003.

== Junction list ==
The entire route is in Kent County.

Location	mi	km	Destinations	Notes
Eastern Neck Island	0.00	0.00	Eastern Neck Road south	Southern terminus
Rock Hall	6.01	9.67	MD 20 (Rock Hall Avenue) – Chestertown	
Tolchester Beach	11.96	19.25	MD 21 east (Tolchester Beach Road) / Tolchester Beach Road west / Bay Shore Road north – Fairlee	Northern terminus; western terminus of MD 21
1.000 mi = 1.609 km; 1.000 km = 0.621 mi
