= Maryland Route 21 =

State highway in Kent County, Maryland, US, known as Tolchester Beach Rd

Maryland Route 21
- Tolchester Beach Road
- Maryland Route 21 highlighted in red

Route information
- Maintained by MDSHA
- Length: 2.42 mi (3.89 km)
- Existed: 1927–present

Major junctions
- West end: MD 445 near Tolchester Beach
- East end: MD 20 near Fairlee

Location
- Country: United States
- State: Maryland
- Counties: Kent

Highway system
- Maryland highway system; Interstate; US; State; Scenic Byways
← MD 20	→ MD 22

Maryland Route 21 (MD 21) is a state highway in the U.S. state of Maryland. Known as Tolchester Beach Road, the highway runs 2.42 miles (3.89 km) from MD 445 near Tolchester Beach east to MD 20 near Fairlee in western Kent County. MD 21 was constructed in the mid-1920s to provide a modern road connection to Tolchester Beach, then a major beach resort on the Chesapeake Bay. The highway's western terminus was rolled back to MD 445 in the early 1990s.

== Route description ==
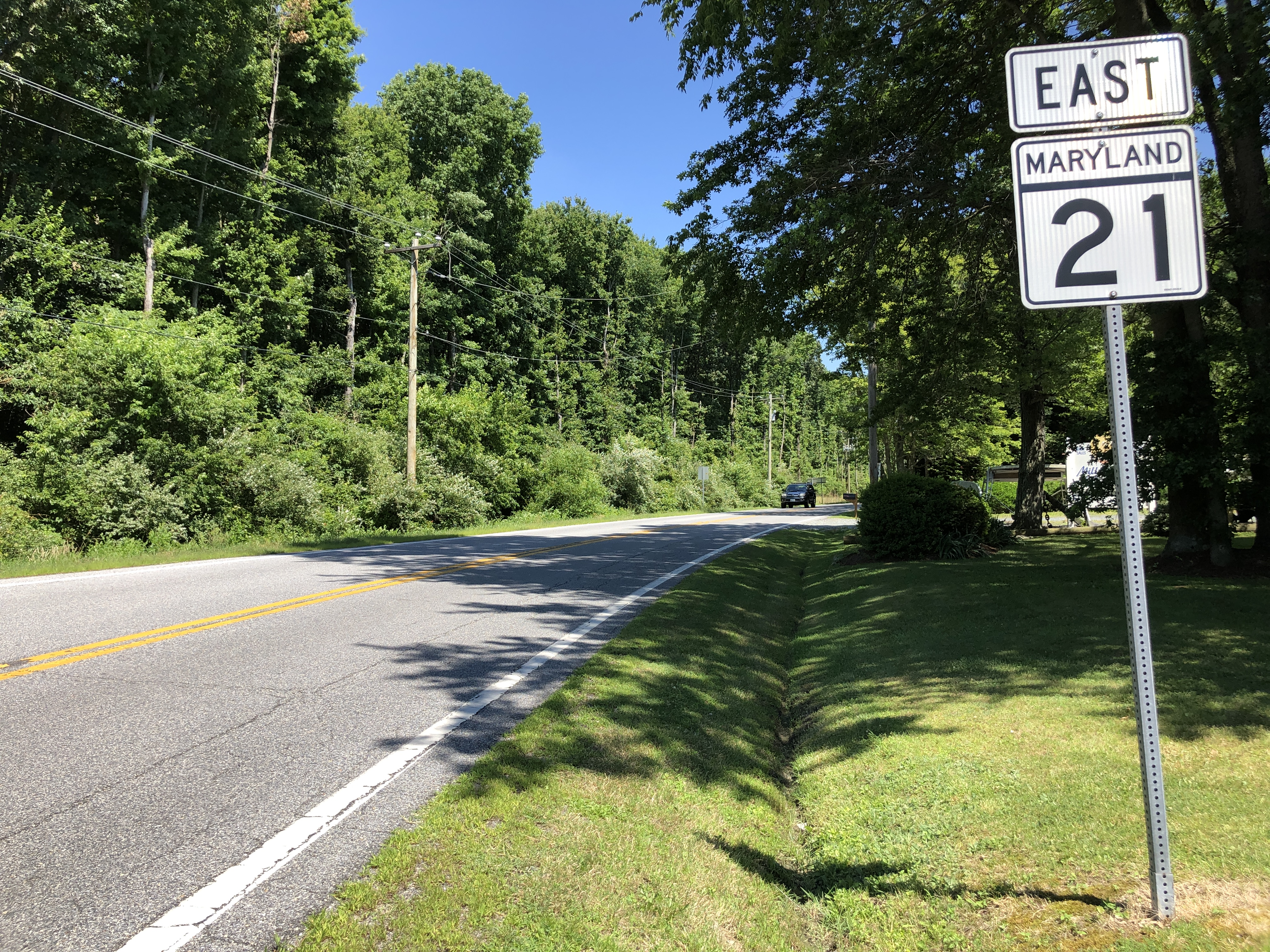
View east along MD 21 at MD 445 near Tolchester Beach

MD 21 begins at Tolchester Beach Road's intersection with the northern end of MD 445 (Tolchester Road), the north leg of the intersection is county-maintained Bay Shore Road, and Tolchester Beach Road continues west as a county road to the eponymous beach community and its marina on the Chesapeake Bay. MD 21 heads southeast as a two-lane undivided road, passing through woodland before running through farmland. The highway reaches its eastern terminus at MD 20 (Rock Hall Road) at McClean's Corner south of Fairlee. The road continues southeast as county-maintained Sandy Bottom Road toward St. Paul's Church.

== History ==
Tolchester Beach was a major resort on the Chesapeake Bay that featured a hotel, pavilion, swimming, and amusement park rides. The resort opened in 1877 and thrived with the traffic generated by steamboat excursions from various ports on the bay, including Baltimore. However, the rise of more modern resorts caused a long decline; Tolchester Beach closed in 1962. Tolchester Beach Road was constructed as a concrete road in 1924 and 1925 to connect the Tolchester Beach resort to the Rock Hall–Chestertown road at McClean's Corner. By 1927, a ferry connected Tolchester Beach with the Inner Harbor of Baltimore. This ferry service continued until between 1940 and 1946. MD 21 was resurfaced with bituminous concrete in 1975. The highway's westernmost 0.04 miles (0.064 km), measured from the high-water mark of the Chesapeake Bay, was transferred from state to county maintenance through an August 16, 1990, road transfer agreement. The western terminus of MD 21 was moved again, this time to MD 445's northern terminus, when the portion of MD 21 between MD 445 and Tolchester Beach was transferred from state to county maintenance through a June 1, 1993, road transfer agreement.

== Junction list ==
The entire route is in Kent County.

Location	mi	km	Destinations	Notes
Tolchester Beach	0.00	0.00	MD 445 south (Tolchester Road) / Tolchester Beach Road west / Bay Shore Road north – Rock Hall	Western terminus; northern terminus of MD 445
Fairlee	2.42	3.89	MD 20 (Rock Hall Road) – Chestertown, Elkton, Rock Hall	Eastern terminus
1.000 mi = 1.609 km; 1.000 km = 0.621 mi
