= Maryland Route 514 =

State highway in Maryland, United States

Maryland Route 514
- Maryland Route 514 highlighted in red

Route information
- Maintained by MDSHA
- Length: 4.89 mi (7.87 km)
- Existed: 1950–present

Major junctions
- South end: MD 20 in Chestertown
- North end: MD 298 at Melitota

Location
- Country: United States
- State: Maryland
- Counties: Kent

Highway system
- Maryland highway system; Interstate; US; State; Scenic Byways
← MD 513	→ MD 518

Maryland Route 514 (MD 514) is a state highway in the U.S. state of Maryland. The highway runs 4.89 miles (7.87 km) from MD 20 in Chestertown north to MD 298 at Melitota in central Kent County. MD 514 was built in the late 1940s and early 1950s from the Chestertown end and extended to Melitota in the late 1980s.

== Route description ==
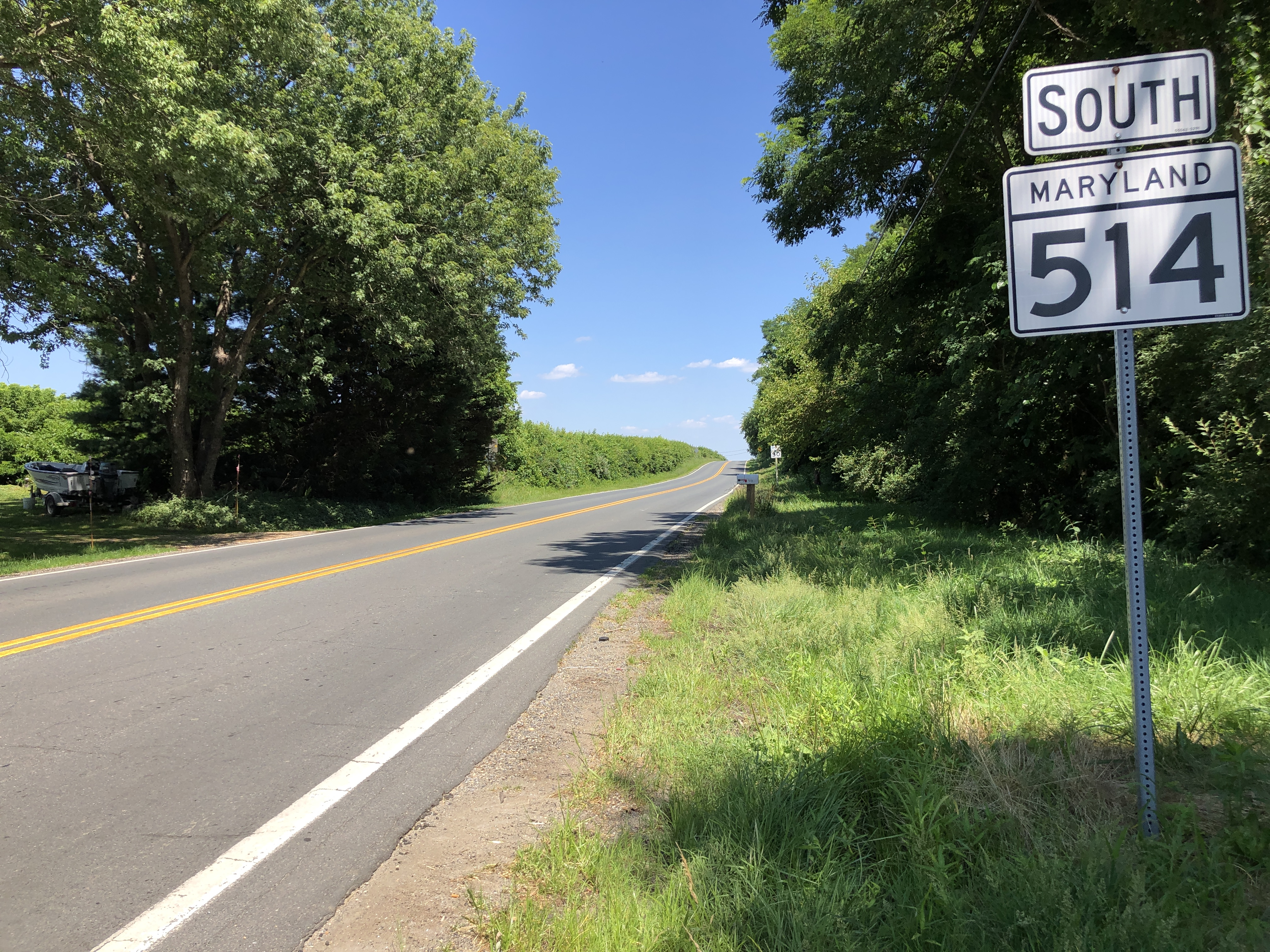
View south along MD 514 at MD 298 in Melitota

MD 514 begins at an intersection with MD 20 (Chestertown Road) just outside the town limits of Chestertown. The highway heads northwest as two-lane undivided Flatland Road, which immediately enters the town for a while, then leaves the town and parallels the limits to Cromwell Clark Road. MD 514 continues northwest to Hanesville Road, where the highway turns west onto Melitota Road. The highway follows that road to its northern terminus at MD 298 (Fairlee Road) in the hamlet of Melitota opposite county-maintained Handy Point Road.

== History ==
In 1948, Kent County requested that the Maryland State Roads Commission make improvement of Flatland Road its highest priority project in the county during the post–World War II road building effort. The highway from MD 20 to Hanesville Road was constructed in two sections. The first 2.25-mile-long (3.62 km) section was built as a gravel road in 1949, and the gravel road was improved with bituminous stabilization the following year. MD 514 was extended to Hanesville Road as a gravel road in 1954. The highway was resurfaced with bituminous concrete in 1970. Melitota Road was transferred from county to state maintenance through a December 1, 1987, road transfer agreement, and the road was confirmed as an extension of MD 514 in July 1988.

== Junction list ==
The entire route is in Kent County.

Location	mi	km	Destinations	Notes
Chestertown	0.00	0.00	MD 20 (Chestertown Road) – Rock Hall	Southern terminus
Melitota	4.89	7.87	MD 298 (Fairlee Road) / Handy Point Road west – Fairlee, Worton	Northern terminus
1.000 mi = 1.609 km; 1.000 km = 0.621 mi
