= Trumpington (disambiguation) =

Trumpington is a suburb of the city of Cambridge, UK.

Trumpington may also refer to:

- Trumpington (Rock Hall, Maryland), a registered historic place in Maryland, US
- Jean Barker, Baroness Trumpington (1922−2018), life peer of the UK

== See also ==
- Trumpington Street, a street in Cambridge, UK
- Trumpington High Street, former name of the A1309, Cambridge, UK
- Trumpington Road, an arterial road in Cambridge, UK
- Trumpton, a stop-motion children's television series
  - Trumptonshire, a fictional county
