= Fairlee Manor Camp House =

Historic house in Maryland, United States

- U.S. National Register of Historic Places
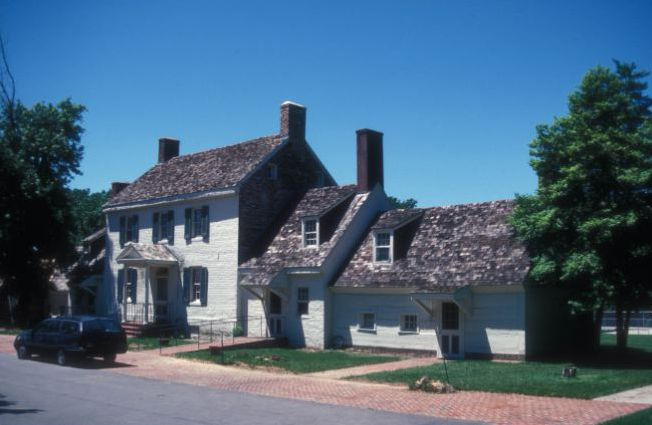

- Location within Maryland Location within the United States
- Nearest city: Fairlee, Maryland
- Coordinates: 39°14′33″N 76°12′12″W
- Built: 1840
- NRHP reference No.: 73000931
- Added to NRHP: April 11, 1973

The Fairlee Manor Camp House, now Camp Fairlee, is a historic home located near Fairlee, Kent County, Maryland, United States. It is a "telescoping house" composed of a two-story, three-bay-long brick structure with a 1 1/2-story brick wing and a 1 1/2-story, 3-bay-long plank wing on each side in decreasing height and width. The oldest sections of the house date to 1825–1840. In 1953 Louisa d'Andelot Carpenter donated Fairlee Manor to the Easter Seal Society for Crippled Children and Adults of Delaware, Inc.

The Fairlee Manor Camp House was listed on the National Register of Historic Places in 1973.
