= Maryland Route 446 =

State highway in Maryland, United States

Maryland Route 446
- Broad Neck Road
- Maryland Route 446 highlighted in red

Route information
- Maintained by MDSHA
- Length: 6.03 mi (9.70 km)
- Existed: 1930–present

Major junctions
- South end: Langford Bay Road near Langford
- North end: MD 20 near Chestertown

Location
- Country: United States
- State: Maryland
- Counties: Kent

Highway system
- Maryland highway system; Interstate; US; State; Scenic Byways
← MD 445	→ MD 449

Maryland Route 446 (MD 446) is a state highway in the U.S. state of Maryland. Known as Broad Neck Road, the highway runs 6.03 miles (9.70 km) from Langford Bay Road south of Langford in western Kent County north to MD 20 near Chestertown. The northern half of MD 446 was constructed around 1930. The highway, including a county section that would become an extension of MD 446 in 1988, was resurfaced in 1971.

== Route description ==
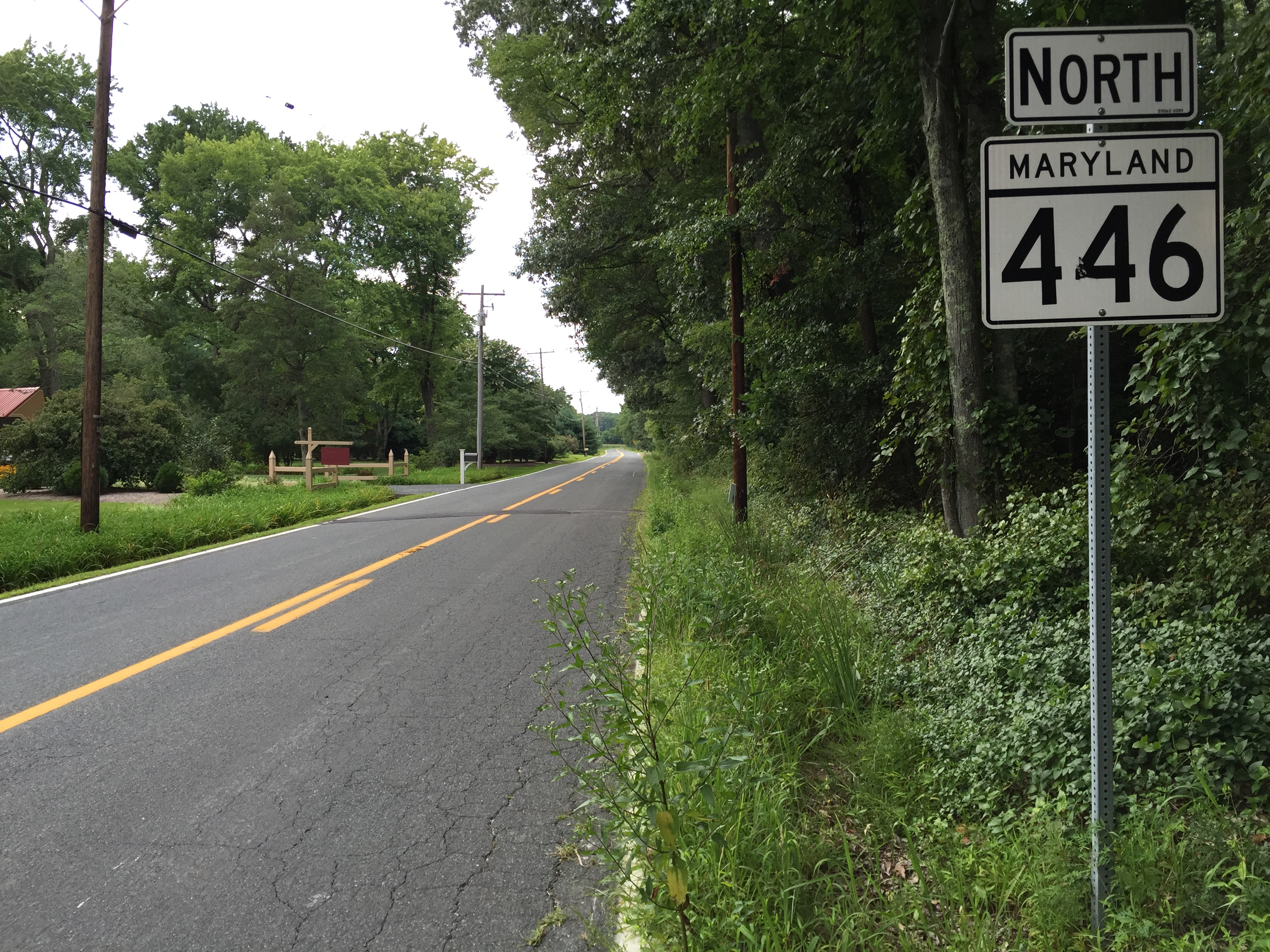
View north at the south end of MD 446 near Langford

MD 446 begins at Broad Neck Road's intersection with Langford Bay Road. The two-lane undivided highway heads north along Broad Neck, a peninsula between the West Fork Branch and East Fork Branch of Langford Creek. MD 446 passes through the hamlet of Langford and crosses Mill Pond Creek shortly before reaching its northern terminus at MD 20 (Chestertown Road) west of Chestertown.

== History ==
MD 446 was constructed as a concrete road from MD 20 to south of Langford in 1929 and 1930. The highway's construction was partially funded by a $900,000 Kent County bond issue used to construct 9-and-16-foot-wide (2.7 and 4.9 m) concrete roads throughout the county. MD 446 was resurfaced with bituminous concrete in 1971. The resurfacing contract included the resurfacing of the portion of county-maintained Broad Neck Road that was brought into the state highway system as an extension of MD 446 through a December 1, 1987, road transfer agreement.

== Junction list ==
The entire route is in Kent County.

Location	mi	km	Destinations	Notes
Langford	0.00	0.00	Broad Neck Road south / Langford Bay Road west	Southern terminus
Chestertown	6.03	9.70	MD 20 (Chestertown Road) – Chestertown, Rock Hall	Northern terminus
1.000 mi = 1.609 km; 1.000 km = 0.621 mi
