= Maryland Route 288 =

Highway in Maryland

Maryland Route 288
- Crosby Road
- Maryland Route 288 highlighted in red

Route information
- Maintained by MDSHA
- Length: 3.33 mi (5.36 km)
- Existed: 1927–present

Major junctions
- West end: MD 20 near Rock Hall
- East end: Long Cove Public Landing near Crosby

Location
- Country: United States
- State: Maryland
- Counties: Kent

Highway system
- Maryland highway system; Interstate; US; State; Scenic Byways
← MD 287	→ MD 289

Maryland Route 288 (MD 288) is a state highway in the U.S. state of Maryland. Known as Crosby Road, the highway runs 3.33 miles (5.36 km) from MD 20 near Rock Hall east to Long Cove Public Landing on the Piney Neck peninsula near Crosby in western Kent County. MD 288 was constructed in the mid-1920s and resurfaced in the mid-1960s.

== Route description ==
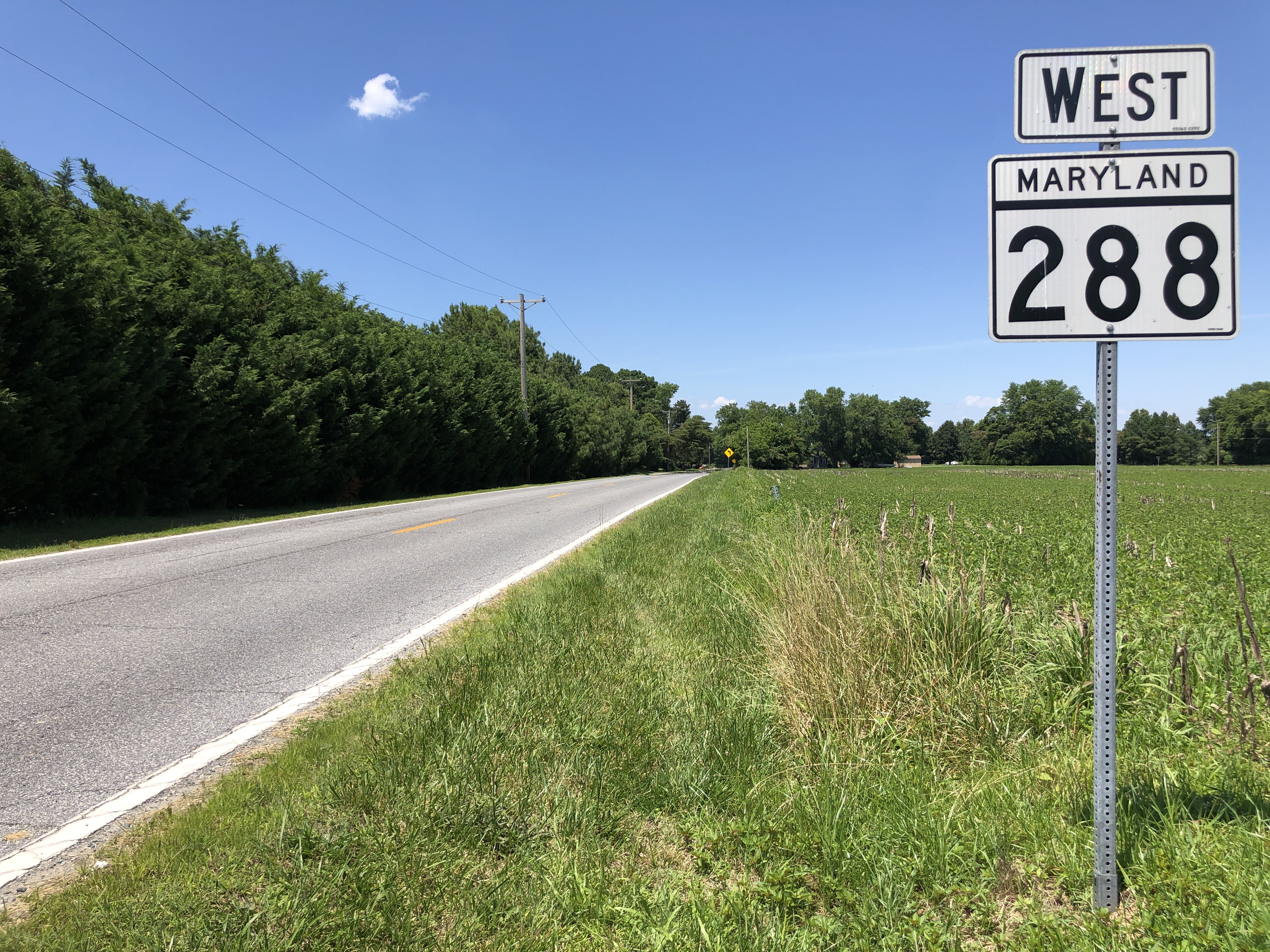
View west along MD 288 in Crosby

MD 288 begins at an intersection with MD 20 (Rock Hall Road) just east of the town of Rock Hall. The two-lane undivided highway heads south along Piney Neck between Grays Inn Creek to the west and Langford Creek to the east. At Skinners Neck Road, MD 288 turns east and then south again at Edesville Road. The highway turns east again in the hamlet of Crosby while Piney Neck Road continues south. MD 288 veers south while McKinleyville Road continues southeast. The highway reaches its eastern terminus at Long Cove Public Landing on Long Cove, an inlet of Langford Creek just north of where the creek empties into the Chester River.

== History ==
MD 288 was constructed as a 9-foot-wide (2.7 m) concrete road from Coleman's Corner on the Rock Hall–Chestertown road (present-day MD 20) to Crouch's Wharf on Piney Neck in 1925 and 1926. MD 288 was resurfaced with bituminous concrete in 1965.

== Junction list ==
The entire route is in Kent County.

Location	mi	km	Destinations	Notes
Rock Hall	0.00	0.00	MD 20 (Rock Hall Road) – Chestertown	Western terminus
Piney Neck	3.33	5.36	Entrance to Long Cove Public Landing	Eastern terminus
1.000 mi = 1.609 km; 1.000 km = 0.621 mi
