= Hinchingham =

Historic house in Maryland, United States

- U.S. National Register of Historic Places
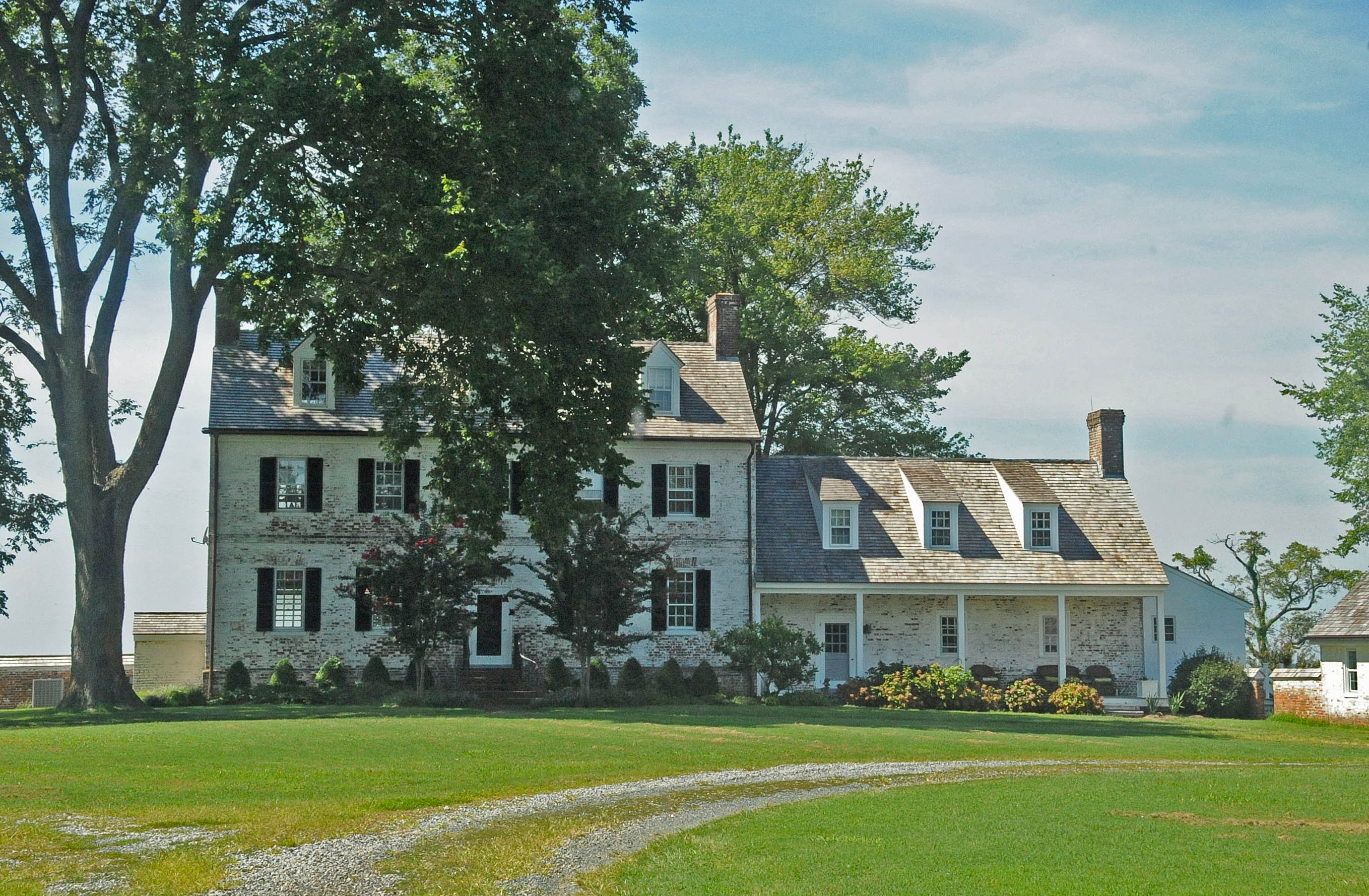

- Location within Maryland Location within the United States
- Nearest city: Rock Hall, Maryland
- Coordinates: 39°11′40″N 76°14′56″W
- Built: 1774
- NRHP reference No.: 75000907
- Added to NRHP: September 05, 1975

Hinchingham is a historic home located at Rock Hall, Kent County, Maryland, United States. It is a 2 1/2-story brick house with a 1 1/2-story brick wing, situated directly on the shore of Chesapeake Bay. It was built in 1774.

Hinchingham was listed on the National Register of Historic Places in 1975.
