= Chesapeake Landing, Maryland =

Chesapeake Landing
- Census-designated place
- Location within the state of Maryland Chesapeake Landing (the United States)
- Country: United States of America
- State: Maryland
- County: Kent

Area
  - Total: 1.13 sq mi (2.92 km^{2})
  - Land: 1.00 sq mi (2.59 km^{2})
  - Water: 0.13 sq mi (0.33 km^{2})

Population (2020)
  - Total: 472
  - Density: 471.4/sq mi (182.01/km^{2})
- Time zone: UTC-5 (Eastern (EST))
  - Summer (DST): UTC-4 (EDT)
- FIPS code: 24-16025

Chesapeake Landing is a census designated place in Kent County, Maryland, United States. Per the 2020 Census, the population was 472.

== Demographics ==
Historical population
Census	Pop.	Note	%±
2020	472		—
U.S. Decennial Census; 2020

Chesapeake Landing first appeared as a census designated place in the 2020 U.S. census.

=== 2020 census ===
Chesapeake Landing CDP, Maryland - Demographic Profile (NH = Non-Hispanic)
Race / Ethnicity	Pop 2020	% 2020
White alone (NH)	387	81.99%
Black or African American alone (NH)	46	9.75%
Native American or Alaska Native alone (NH)	1	0.21%
Asian alone (NH)	2	0.42%
Pacific Islander alone (NH)	0	0.00%
Some Other Race alone (NH)	1	0.21%
Mixed Race/Multi-Racial (NH)	26	5.51%
Hispanic or Latino (any race)	9	1.91%
Total	472	100.00%

Note: the US Census treats Hispanic/Latino as an ethnic category. This table excludes Latinos from the racial categories and assigns them to a separate category. Hispanics/Latinos can be of any race.
