= Trumpington (Rock Hall, Maryland) =

Historic house in Maryland, United States

- U.S. National Register of Historic Places
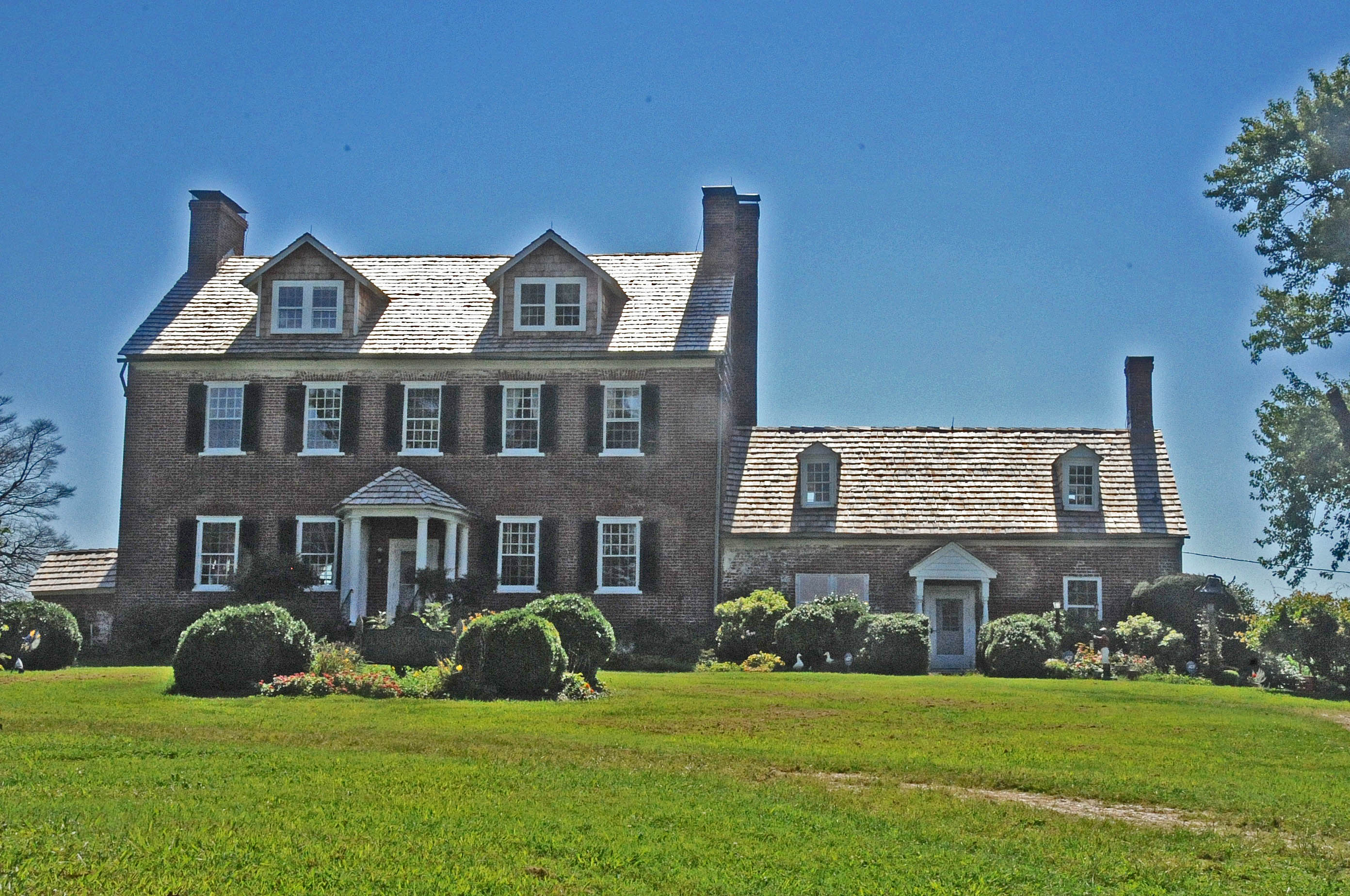

- Location within Maryland Location within the United States
- Nearest city: Rock Hall, Maryland
- Coordinates: 39°3′47″N 76°13′39″W
- Architectural style: Georgian
- NRHP reference No.: 80001821
- Added to NRHP: November 10, 1980

Trumpington is a historic home located at Rock Hall, Kent County, Maryland. Its Georgian plan main house is of Flemish bond brick construction five bays long, two rooms deep, and two and a half stories high. A 1 1/2-story brick wing is attached. Also on the property is a log plank meathouse, a 19th-century granary, a small cemetery, a 20th-century barn, and mid-20th-century frame cottage.

The house was listed on the National Register of Historic Places in 1980.
