= Eastern Neck National Wildlife Refuge =

Protected area in Maryland, United States

- IUCN category IV (habitat/species management area)
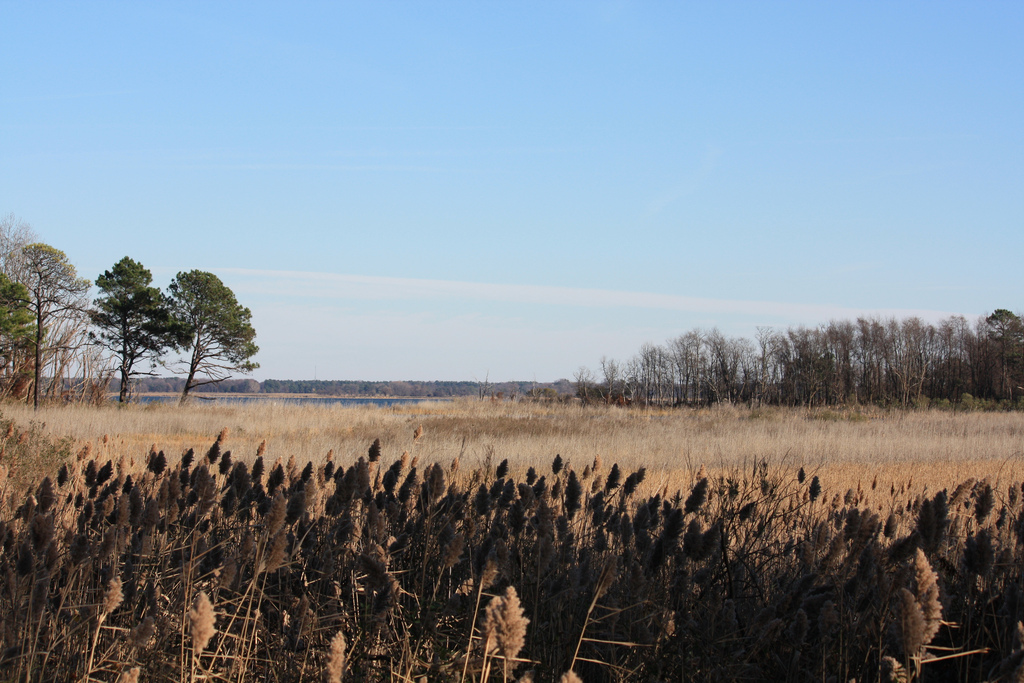
- A view to the south from the Duck Inn trail

- Location within Maryland Location within the United States
- Location: Kent County, Maryland, United States
- Nearest city: Rock Hall, Maryland
- Coordinates: 39.04177°N 76.233°W
- Area: 2,286 acres (9.25 km^{2})
- Established: 1962
- Governing body: U.S. Fish and Wildlife Service
- Website: Eastern Neck National Wildlife Refuge

Eastern Neck National Wildlife Refuge, a part of the Chesapeake Marshlands National Wildlife Refuge Complex, is a 2,286-acre (9.25 km^{2}) island located at the confluence of the Chester River and the Chesapeake Bay. Established in 1962 as a sanctuary for migratory birds, Eastern Neck National Wildlife Refuge provides natural habitat for over 240 bird species — including bald eagles and transitory peregrine falcons — and is a major staging site for tundra swans.

The refuge comprises the entirety of Eastern Neck Island, projecting into a bend of the Chester River. The island was one of the first settled places in Maryland, where Major Joseph Wickes was granted 800 acres (3.2 km^{2}) in 1650 and built the now-vanished "Wickliffe" mansion.

== History ==
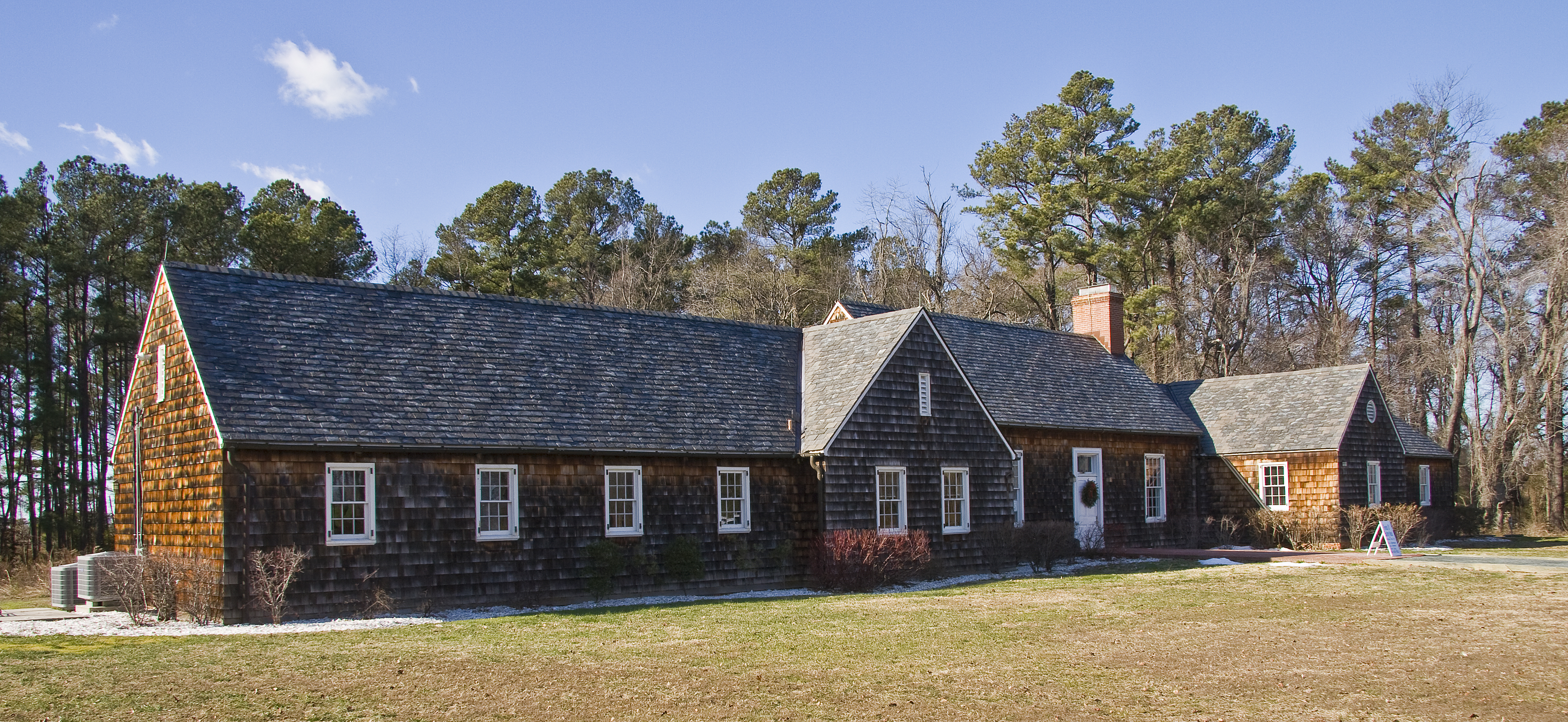
The lodge

The island was visited in precolonial times by Woodland period Native Americans, who left shell middens, arrowheads and pottery behind. From 1658 to 1680, Joseph Wickes and his partner Thomas Hynson assembled the entire island under their ownership, farming the land. Captain Lambert Wickes, Joseph's great grandson and captain of the USS Reprisal, is memorialized with a monument on the site of Wickliffe. The island was owned by the Wickes until 1902, who continued to raise a variety of crops on the land. After 1902 portions of the island became hunting preserves. In the 1920s, wealthy individuals from surrounding cities were attracted by the waterfowl concentrations and bought portions of the island for hunting retreats. The present visitor contact station was built as a hunting lodge in 1930.

During the 1950s a property developer proposed to subdivide a portion of the island into 293 house lots. The U.S. Fish and Wildlife Service acquired the entire island between 1962 and 1967, preserving the land for wildlife. This purchase was largely in response to concerns over the development made by the local community. The sole house built for the Cape Chester subdivision now houses park personnel.

The Kent County Department of Parks and Recreation operates the Ingleside Recreation Area, under a cooperative agreement with the U.S. Fish & Wildlife Service, from May 1 to September 30, with facilities for crabbing and car-top boat launching.

Eastern Neck National Wildlife Refuge serves as a land-use model within the Chesapeake Bay watershed through its sustainable agriculture, wetland restoration and native landscaping.

Eastern Neck National Wildlife Refuge attracts over 70,000 visitors annually to its waterfront vistas, peaceful walking trails, and "watchable wildlife", making it an increasingly popular nature tourism destination on Maryland's upper Eastern Shore.

== Alternative Energy Program ==
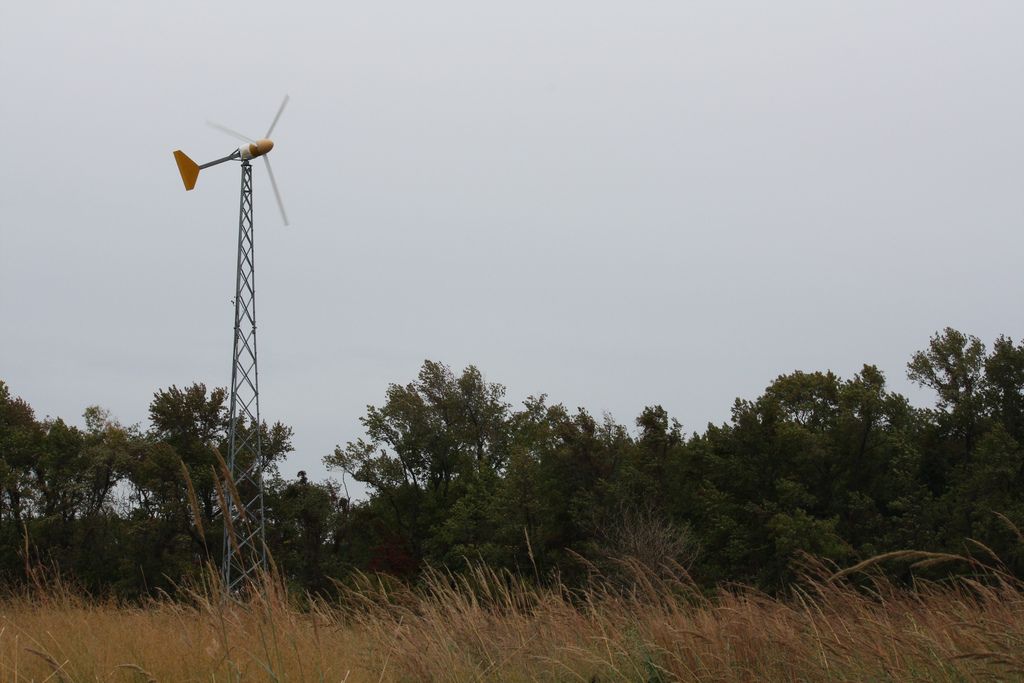
The wind turbine installed at the Eastern Neck Island National Wildlife Management Area, Rock Hall, MD, in 2002 was the first turbine installed at a National WMA.

In 2002, Eastern Neck Island became the first National Wildlife Refuge in the United States to install a wind turbine on its grounds. The project was made possible when the Maryland Energy Administration received $58,800 from the U.S. Department of Energy as a result of the State Energy Program solicitation. The project also include the construction of a solar renewable energy system at the refuge.

The purpose of the 10 kW wind turbine is to provide on-site electric power to an administration building, while publicly demonstrating the concept of renewable energy. The project also exists to measure any avian interaction with the refuge's wind turbine. The DOE's Federal Energy Management Program (FEMP) has allowed Eastern Neck NWR to contract the services of an expert in order to document the extent to which bird behavior is altered by the operation of the turbine.

The turbine itself consists of three blades, which cover a circular area 23 feet (7.0 m) in diameter. The tower is 60 feet (18 m). Considering the average wind speeds of the area, the system was designed to produce about 10,000 kW-hours per year.

The two solar array panel groups generate peak levels of 150 and 167 watts, respectively.

== Activities ==
Aside from birding and other wildlife viewing, Eastern Neck Island offers facilities and trails for hiking, boating, crabbing, fishing, hunting and biking.

Eastern Neck Island Road begins at the Tundra Swan Boardwalk at the refuge's entrance and runs down the center of the island to the Wickliffe Historic Site, nearly to the southern tip. All trails and activities at the refuge are accessed from secondary roads off the main strip.

=== Hiking ===
Nearly six miles of roads and trails are open to visitors most of the year. Three wildlife trails and a handicap-accessible boardwalk and observation tower are available for those wishing to observe the varied habitats of the refuge.

Trails include the Tidal Marsh Overlook trail, the Bayview/Butterfly trail, the Duck Inn and the Boxes Point trail, accessed directly off Eastern Neck Road. The latter is a popular site for bald eagle sightings.

== Wildlife ==
The refuge bird list contains 243 species recorded on the refuge and includes wintering lesser scaup, long-tailed ducks, white-winged scoters, ruddy ducks, canvasbacks, buffleheads, redheads, and pintails. Numerous marsh and shore birds migrate through in spring and fall. Mallards, American black ducks, wood ducks, great blue herons, and green herons nest at the refuge.

Birds of prey are also common and in some cases abundant at the refuge according to visitor guides. Bald eagles have fledged young each year since 1986, osprey establish nests in the spring and head south before the fall, and turkey vultures are abundant throughout the year.

== See also ==
- List of parks in the Baltimore–Washington metropolitan area
