= Tolchester, Maryland =

- Census-designated place
- Location within Maryland Location within the United States
- Coordinates: 39°13′22″N 76°14′19″W
- Country: United States
- State: Maryland
- County: Kent

Area
  - Total: 0.62 sq mi (1.60 km^{2})
  - Land: 0.61 sq mi (1.58 km^{2})
  - Water: 0.0039 sq mi (0.01 km^{2})
- Elevation: 26 ft (7.9 m)

Population (2020)
  - Total: 297
  - Density: 487/sq mi (187.9/km^{2})
- Time zone: UTC−5 (Eastern (EST))
  - Summer (DST): UTC−4 (EDT)
- ZIP code: 21620
- Area codes: 410 & 443
- FIPS code: 24-78120
- GNIS feature ID: 595180

Tolchester is a census-designated place in Kent County, Maryland, United States. Its population was 329 as of the 2010 census. The CDP covers the unincorporated community commonly known as Tolchester Beach.

== Demographics ==
Historical population
Census	Pop.	Note	%±
2020	297		—
U.S. Decennial Census
