= Langford, Maryland =

Unincorporated community in Maryland, United States

- Unincorporated community
- Location within Maryland
- Coordinates: 39°11′18″N 76°08′27″W
- Country: United States
- State: Maryland
- County: Kent
- Elevation: 66 ft (20 m)
- Time zone: UTC-5 (Eastern (EST))
  - Summer (DST): UTC-4 (EDT)
- Area codes: 410 & 443
- GNIS feature ID: 588792

Langford is an unincorporated community in Kent County, Maryland, United States. Langford is located along Maryland Route 446 on Broad Neck, 4.25 miles (6.84 km) west-southwest of Chestertown.
