= Edesville, Maryland =

- Census-designated place
- Location within Maryland Location within the United States
- Coordinates: 39°09′18″N 76°12′27″W
- Country: United States
- State: Maryland
- County: Kent

Area
  - Total: 0.29 sq mi (0.74 km^{2})
  - Land: 0.27 sq mi (0.71 km^{2})
  - Water: 0.0077 sq mi (0.02 km^{2})
- Elevation: 26 ft (7.9 m)

Population (2020)
  - Total: 169
  - Density: 612.7/sq mi (236.58/km^{2})
- Time zone: UTC-5 (Eastern (EST))
  - Summer (DST): UTC-4 (EDT)
- ZIP code: 21661
- Area codes: 410 & 443
- FIPS code: 24-24925
- GNIS feature ID: 590132

Edesville is an unincorporated community and census-designated place in Kent County, Maryland, United States. Its population was 169 as of the 2010 census.

== Demographics ==
Historical population
Census	Pop.	Note	%±
2020	169		—
U.S. Decennial Census
