= St. Paul's Church (Fairlee, Maryland) =

Historic church in Maryland, United States

- U.S. National Register of Historic Places
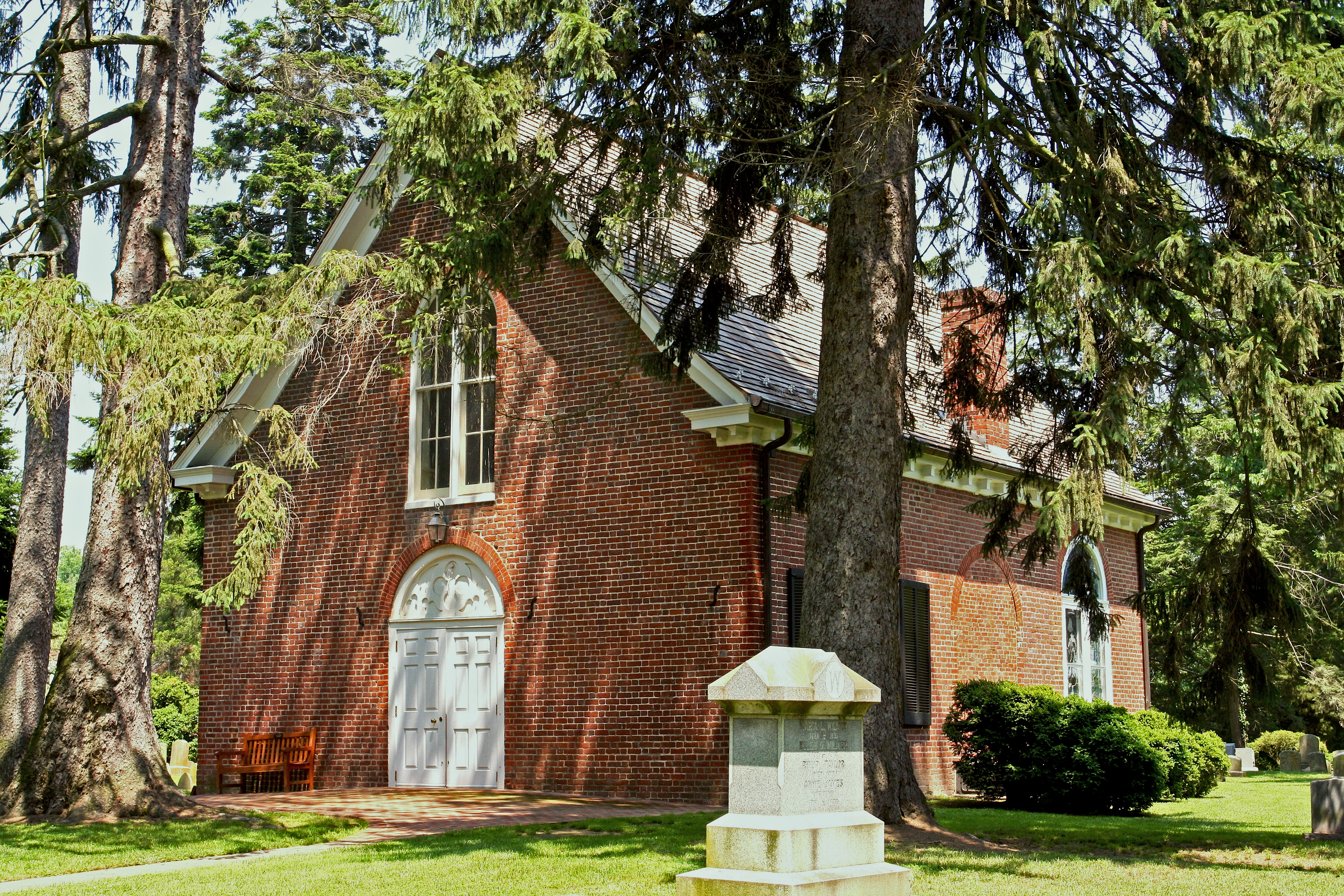
- St. Paul's Episcopal Church

- Location within Maryland Location within the United States
- Location: 7579 Sandy Bottom Rd., Chestertown, Maryland
- Nearest city: Chestertown, Maryland
- Coordinates: 39°11′11″N 76°10′47″W
- Area: 12 acres (4.9 ha)
- Built: 1711-1713
- Architectural style: Georgian
- NRHP reference No.: 80001820
- Added to NRHP: June 6, 1980

St. Paul's Church is a historic Episcopal church located near the village of Fairlee, southwest of Chestertown, Kent County, Maryland. St. Paul's Church is one of the original thirty parishes created in 1692 by an Act of the General Assembly declaring the Church of England as the established religion of the Province of Maryland. The Georgian-styled building, completed in 1713, is the second-oldest Episcopal church on the Eastern Shore of Maryland (after Trinity Church in Church Creek, built in 1675).

== History ==
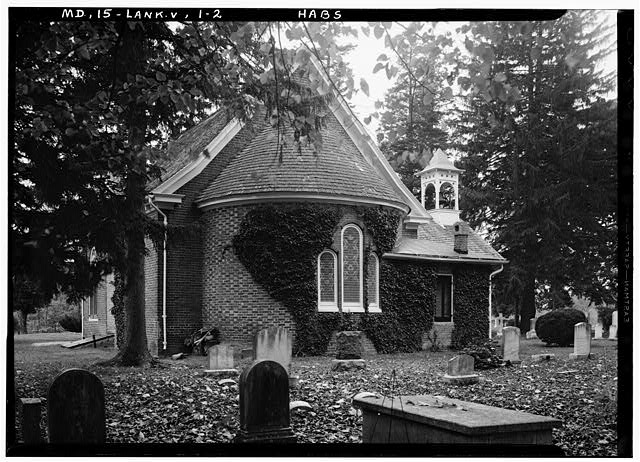
St. Paul's Church, 1936

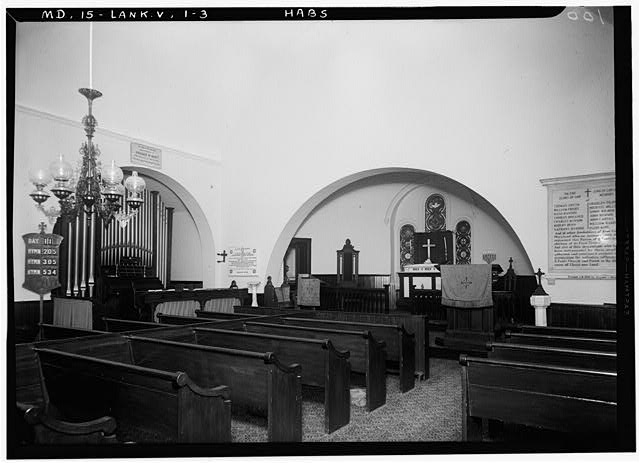
St. Paul's interior, 1936

St. Paul's Parish was laid out according to an Act of the General Assembly in 1692. The parish vestry, consisting of Thomas Smith, Charles Tilden, William Frisby, Michael Miller, Hans Hanson, and Simon Wilmer, convened for the first time on January 30, 1693 and set out parameters for the construction of the first parish church. The church was built by Daniel Norris at a cost of twenty-one thousand pounds of tobacco and completed by 1696.

In 1711, upon the appointment of Rev. Alexander Williamson as Rector of St. Paul's Parish, the vestry made a contract with James Harris to construct a new brick church for the parish, to be "40 feet long in the clear and 20 feet wide in the clear, to be 16 feet from the ground, 5 windows, 2 doors and cases, the brick wall to be 2 1/2 bricks thick to the water table and 2 bricks thick from thence upward, a circle to be at the east end for the communion." The cost for the new church was seventy thousand pounds of tobacco and construction took two years to complete. On April 6, 1713, James Harris delivered the new St. Paul's Church to the parish vestry. Over the next two years, the interior of the building was plastered and fitted with thirty-four pews, a pulpit, reading desk, and the aisles were laid in brick of herringbone bond.

The Vestry House, once a common feature of parishes in the Mid-Atlantic, was constructed in 1766. Only two of these structures survive in Maryland today, the other located at St. George's Church in Perryman, Maryland.

Opened in 1713, St. Paul's is currently the oldest continuously used Episcopal church building in Maryland. It measures 30 by 40 feet (9.1 m × 12.2 m) with a semicircular apse on the east gable where musicians would have sat. The floor was not raised as it is today, nor was there an altar. People sat in “box pews” on chairs and faced the pulpit in the middle of the north wall. The main door was on the south wall.

Among the notable rectors who served the parish in the 18th century was Rev. James Sterling who served from 1740-63. An Irish-born clergyman, Sterling was a poet, playwright, socialite, and entrepreneur who also served as the customs collector for Chestertown during his time in Kent County. Rev. William Smith, rector of Emmanuel Church in Chestertown, became rector of St. Paul's Parish in 1779. A founder of Washington College, Rev. Smith embraced the independence movement in the American colonies and presided over the convention of 1780 at which the Episcopal Diocese of Maryland was organized. This action kept St. Paul's Church open through the period of disestablishment following the Revolutionary War.

After the American Revolutionary War, St. Paul's Parish entered a period of stagnation and decline. Half a century later in 1840, only thirteen families were recorded on the parish rolls. However, under the effective leadership of several rectors in the mid-19th century, the parish was revived and improvements were made to the church. In 1841, a vestry was added and the interior refitted with new pews. The sanctuary was also aligned to support worship focused on the sacrament in accordance with the growing Oxford Movement. Upon the completion of these projects, St. Paul's Church was consecrated on November 26, 1843 by the Right Reverend William Rollinson Whittingham, Bishop of the Diocese of Maryland. During the American Civil War, a triptych stained-glass window was installed in the apse above the altar employing the colors and symbols that were later incorporated into the Maryland State Flag as a symbol of unity among the divided sympathies of the parish.

St. Paul's Church continued to prosper throughout the late-19th century. Among the rectors to serve the parish during this time was Rev. Sewell S. Hepburn, whose tenure begin in 1874 and concluded in 1881. He was the grandfather of actress Katharine Hepburn. Another prolific pastor of the parish in the late-19th century was Rev. Christopher Denroche who arrived at St. Paul's from Canada in 1892 and remained with the parish until his death in 1906. Rev. Denroche contributed to the documenting of the history of the parish in his book, A Souvenir History of the Parish of St. Paul's, Kent County Maryland, published in 1893 for the parish's bicentennial. He also conducted research which led to the erection of a monument for the Battle of Caulk's Field, fought on August 30, 1814, Kent County's only scene of action from the War of 1812. More enhancements were made to St. Paul's Church including the addition of a cast iron chandelier in 1882, a marble altar in 1890, and stained glass windows throughout the nave in 1912.

During the 20th century, St. Paul's Parish continued to develop the campus surrounding the historic church. A new parish hall and rectory were added in 1948, designed by Baltimore architect Bryden Hyde, a descendant of the parish's second rector, Rev. Stephen Bordley. In 1967, the vestry was enlarged and further improvements were made to the church. St. Paul's Church was placed on the National Register of Historic Places in 1980. The parish celebrated its tercentenary in 1992 with a year-long festival which included a visit from Canon John Sausmarez of Canterbury Cathedral.
