= Fairlee, Maryland =

- Census-designated place
- Location within Maryland Location within the United States
- Coordinates: 39°13′21″N 76°10′19″W
- Country: United States
- State: Maryland
- County: Kent

Area
  - Total: 3.91 sq mi (10.12 km^{2})
  - Land: 3.79 sq mi (9.82 km^{2})
  - Water: 0.12 sq mi (0.30 km^{2})
- Elevation: 79 ft (24 m)

Population (2020)
  - Total: 500
  - Density: 131.9/sq mi (50.92/km^{2})
- Time zone: UTC-5 (Eastern (EST))
  - Summer (DST): UTC-4 (EDT)
- ZIP code: 21620
- Area codes: 410 & 443
- FIPS code: 24-27325
- GNIS feature ID: 588770

Fairlee is an unincorporated community and census-designated place in Kent County, Maryland, United States. Its population was 490 as of the 2010 census.

The Battle of Caulk's Field during the War of 1812 took place near Fairlee on August 31, 1814; it ended in victory for the local militia, and the British commander was killed during the fighting.

The Fairlee Manor Camp House and St. Paul's Church are listed on the National Register of Historic Places.

== Demographics ==
Historical population
| Census | Pop. | Note | %± |
|---|---|---|---|
| 2020 | 500 | | — |
U.S. Decennial Census
