= Rock Hall, Maryland =

- Town
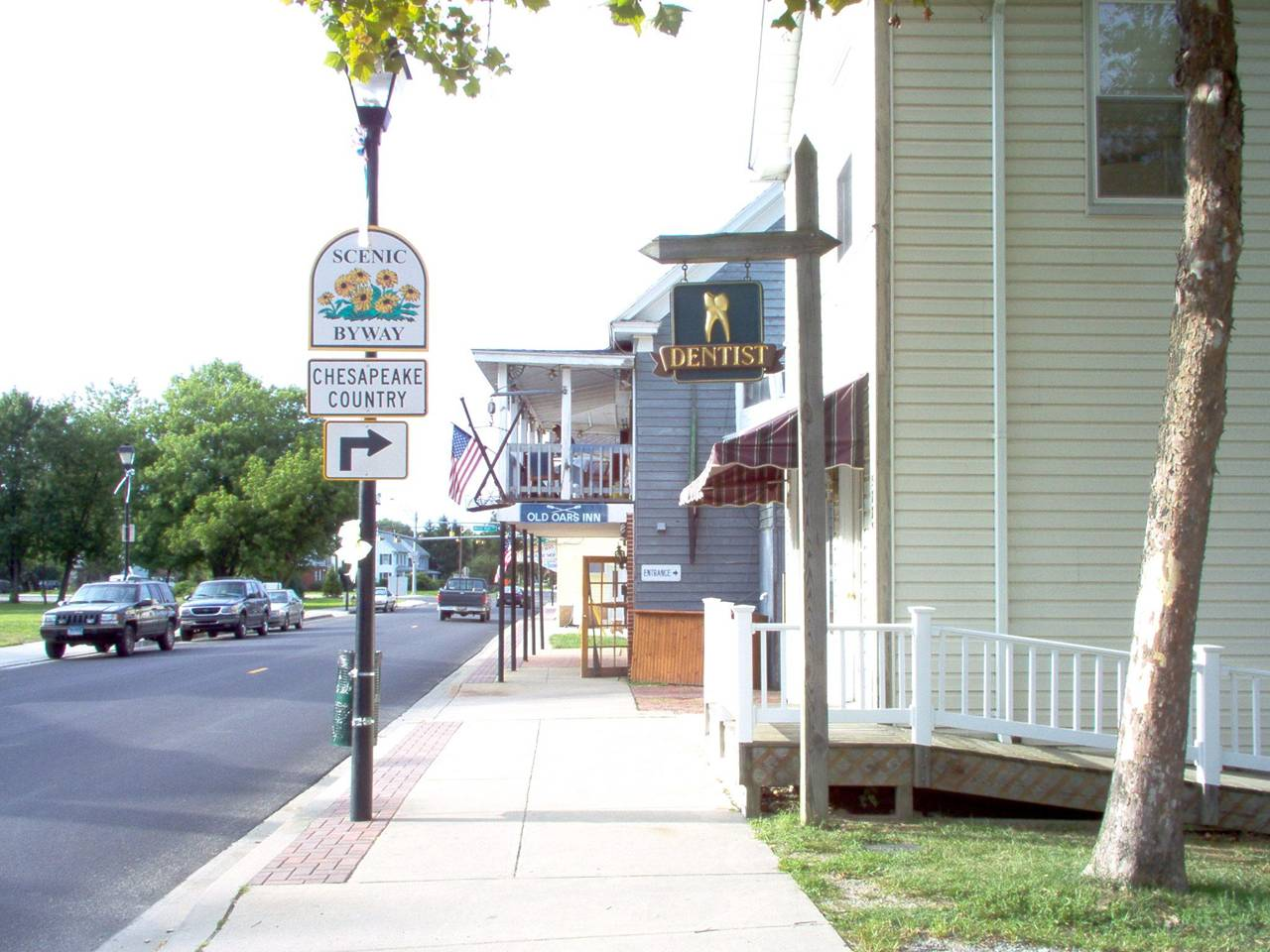
- Main St. Rock Hall

- Flag Seal
- Nickname: Rock City
- Motto: "Pearl of the Chesapeake"
- Location of Rock Hall, Maryland
- Coordinates: 39°8′12″N 76°14′31″W
- Country: United States
- State: Maryland
- County: Kent
- Founded: 1707
- Incorporated: 1908

Government
  - Type: Mayor-Council-Manager
  - Mayor: James A. Cook (L)

Area
  - Total: 1.55 sq mi (4.02 km^{2})
  - Land: 1.34 sq mi (3.47 km^{2})
  - Water: 0.21 sq mi (0.55 km^{2})
- Elevation: 9.8 ft (3 m)

Population (2020)
  - Total: 1,198
  - Density: 895.5/sq mi (345.74/km^{2})
- Time zone: UTC-5 (Eastern (EST))
  - Summer (DST): UTC-4 (EDT)
- ZIP code: 21661
- Area code: 410
- FIPS code: 24-67400
- GNIS feature ID: 0586872
- Website: Town of Rock Hall, Maryland

Rock Hall, is a waterfront town located directly on the National Chesapeake Scenic Byway in Kent County, Maryland, United States. As of the 2020 census, Rock Hall had a population of 1,198.

== History ==
Originally called Rock Hall Crossroads, the city is now a fishing, sailing and recreational boating town situated on the upper Eastern Shore of the Chesapeake Bay. It is the center of Kent County's maritime industries, and is also a popular tourist destination. It was established in 1707. The city was named for a mansion made of white sandstone, and was incorporated in 1908.

Rock Hall served as a shipping point for tobacco, seafood and other agricultural products, as well as a passenger transport connection for travelers during the Colonial era. Later, fishing and seafood processing became the town's largest industry.

The town missed out on receiving a railroad connection in 1872, when the Kent County Railroad set out to build from Massey via Chestertown and connect with a ferry to Baltimore for both passengers and freight. The company went bankrupt in 1877, having only built a stub from Chestertown to a place called Belair or Parsons and abandoning the rest unfinished.

Rock Hall Harbor remains a working harbor with an active fleet of commercial watermen, charter fishing and commercial sailing boats. It has three museums including a waterman's museum.

Hinchingham and Trumpington are listed on the National Register of Historic Places.

Rock Hall is also home to Eastern Neck National Wildlife Refuge, which is home to over 240 bird species and is a habitat for the endangered Delmarva fox squirrel. The refuge was established in 1962 when the U.S. Fish and Wildlife Service purchased the land to protect it from a planned housing development. The refuge was established as a sanctuary for migratory birds, and the Audubon Society has designated this refuge an Important Bird Area.

== Geography ==
According to the United States Census Bureau, the town has a total area of 1.55 square miles (4.01 km^{2}), of which 1.34 square miles (3.47 km^{2}) is land and 0.21 square miles (0.54 km^{2}) is water.

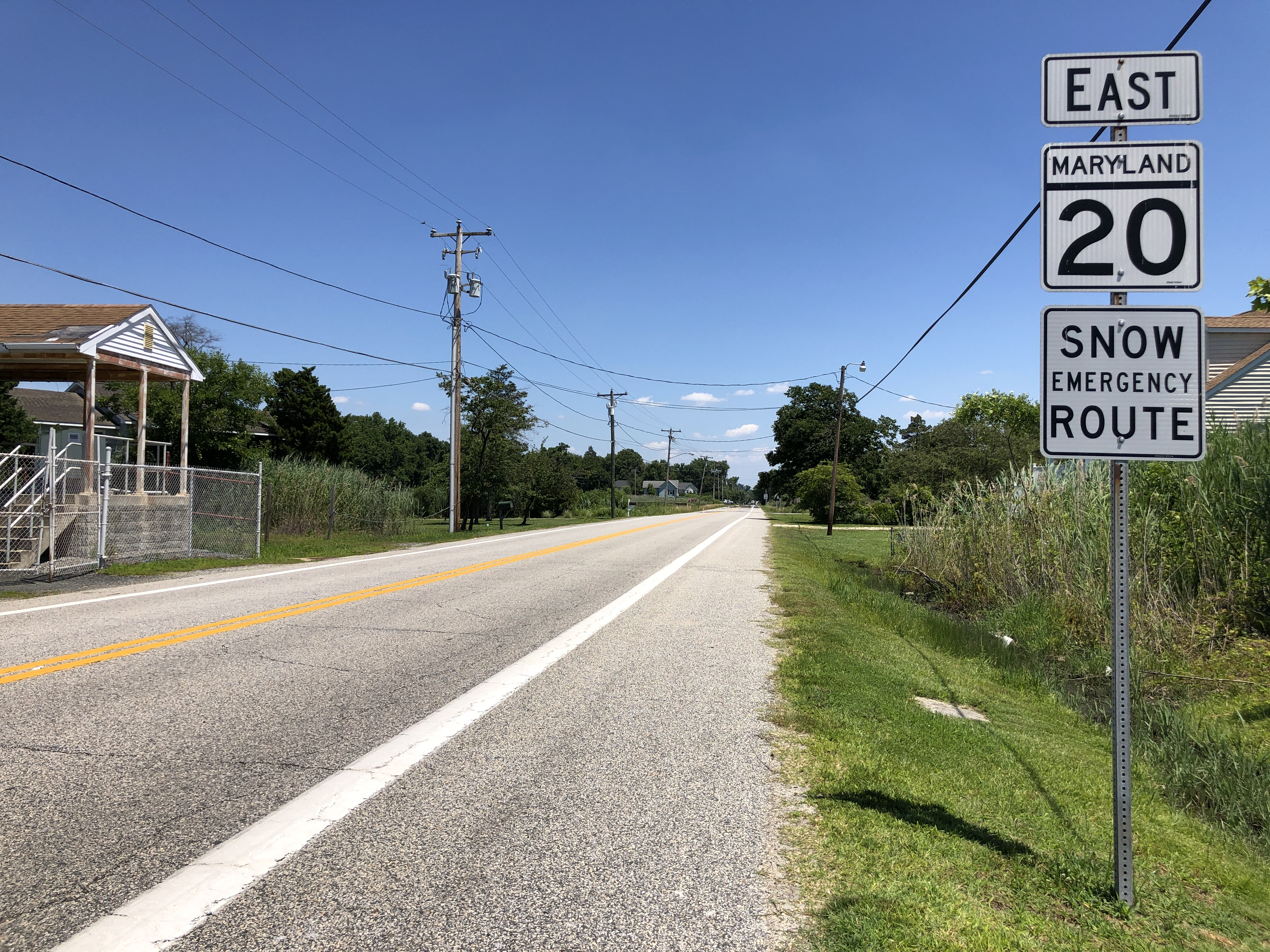
MD 20 eastbound in Rock Hall

== Transportation ==
The main method of transportation in and out of Rock Hall is by road, and two state highways serve the town. The primary highway serving the town is Maryland Route 20, which connects eastward from Rock Hall to Chestertown. Maryland Route 445 also traverses the town on a north-south alignment.

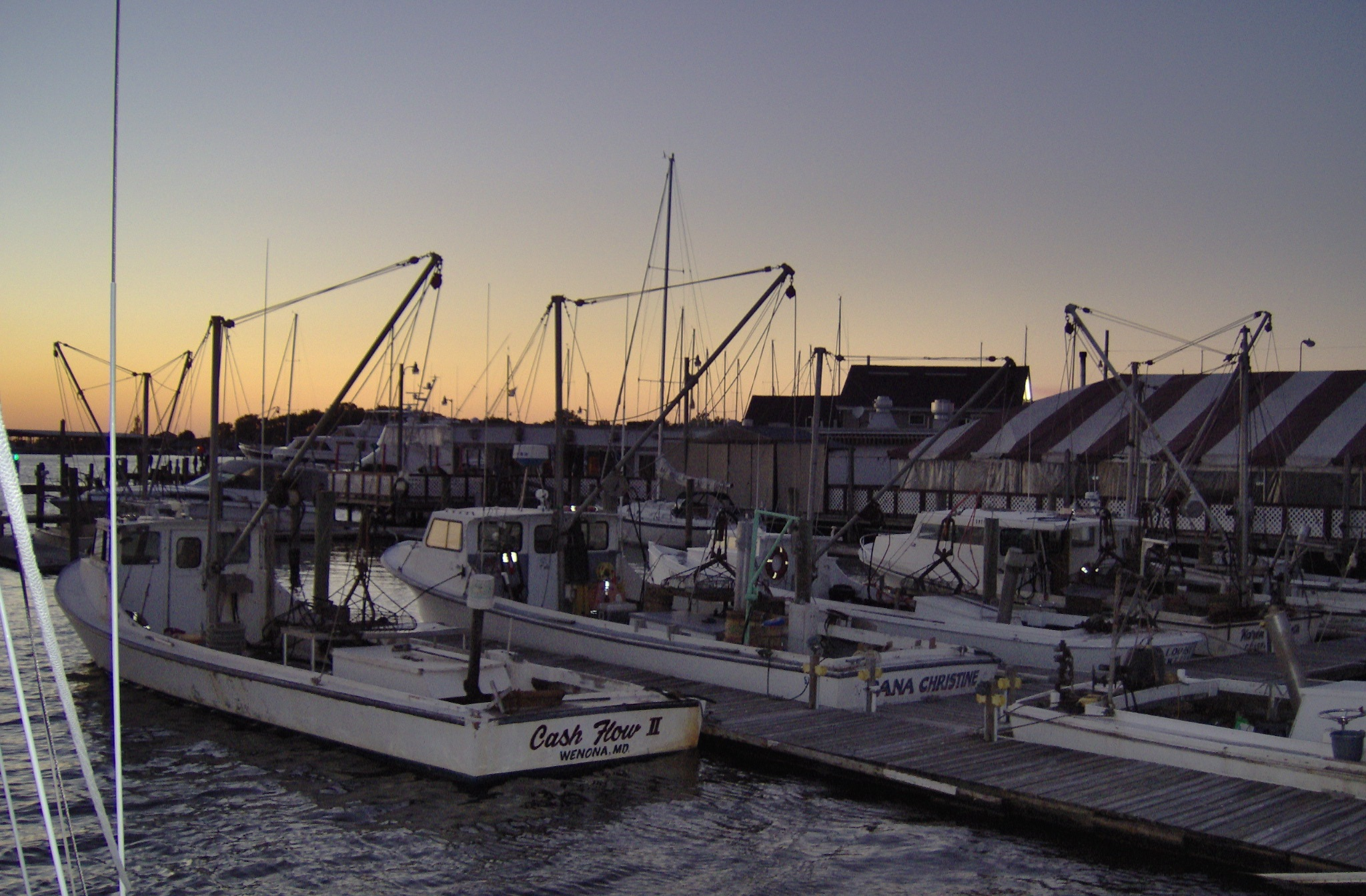
Working crab and oyster boats

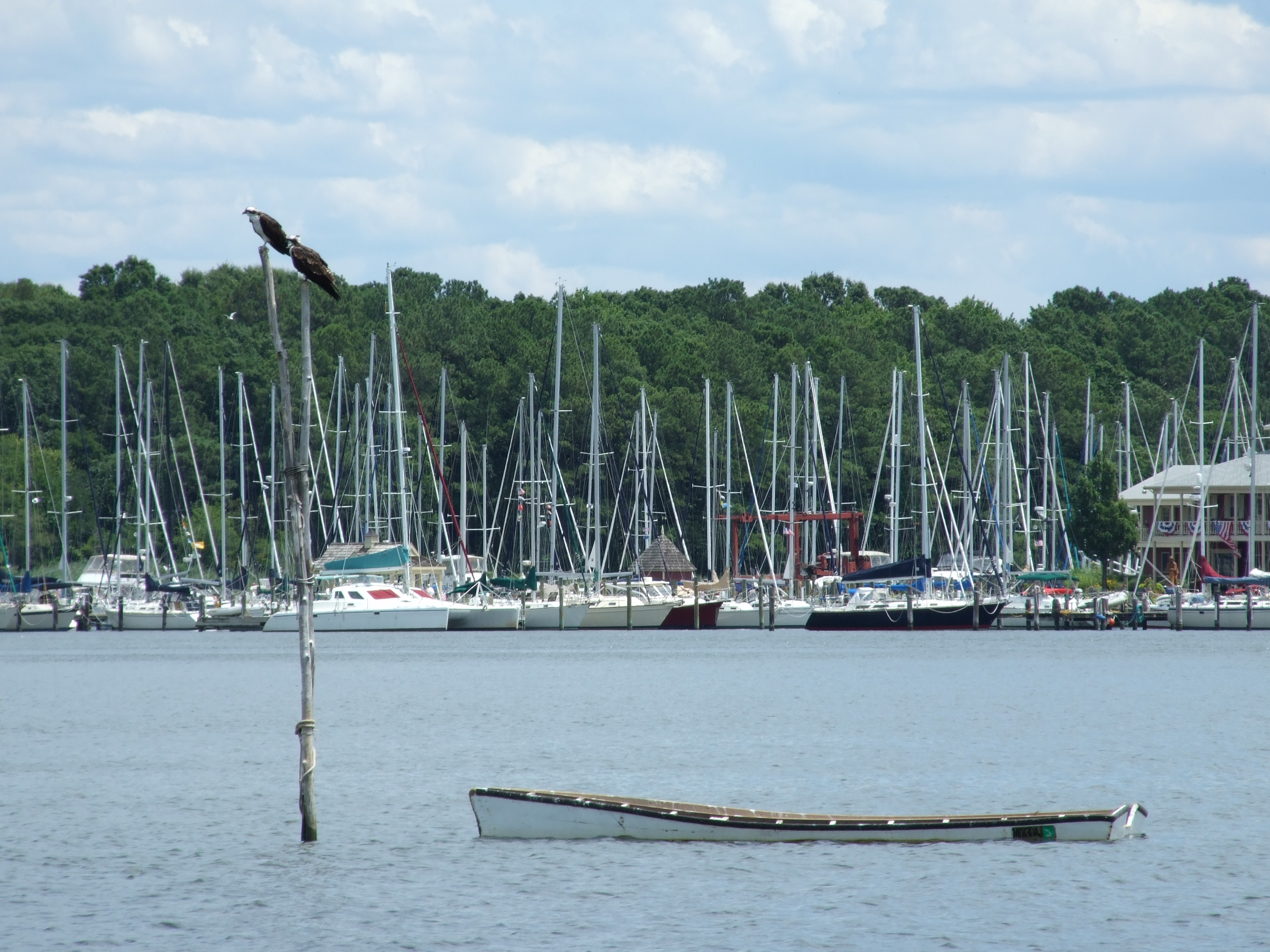
Modern marina resorts

== Demographics ==
Historical population
Census	Pop.	Note	%±
1880	221		—
1910	781		—
1930	405		—
1940	781		92.8%
1950	786		0.6%
1960	1,073		36.5%
1970	1,125		4.8%
1980	1,511		34.3%
1990	1,584		4.8%
2000	1,396		−11.9%
2010	1,310		−6.2%
2020	1,198		−8.5%
U.S. Decennial Census

=== 2010 census ===
As of the census of 2010, there were 1,310 people, 630 households, and 374 families residing in the town. The population density was 977.6 inhabitants per square mile (377.5/km^{2}). There were 930 housing units at an average density of 694.0 per square mile (268.0/km^{2}). The racial makeup of the town was 92.0% White, 5.8% African American, 0.2% Asian, 0.1% from other races, and 1.9% from two or more races. Hispanic or Latino of any race were 1.5% of the population.

There were 630 households, of which 19.2% had children under the age of 18 living with them, 43.5% were married couples living together, 11.4% had a female householder with no husband present, 4.4% had a male householder with no wife present, and 40.6% were non-families. 35.9% of all households were made up of individuals, and 19.7% had someone living alone who was 65 years of age or older. The average household size was 2.05 and the average family size was 2.57.

The median age in the town was 54.3 years. 15.2% of residents were under the age of 18; 5.3% were between the ages of 18 and 24; 16.4% were from 25 to 44; 33% were from 45 to 64; and 30% were 65 years of age or older. The gender makeup of the town was 47.2% male and 52.8% female.

=== 2000 census ===
As of the census of 2000, there were 1,396 people, 654 households, and 408 families residing in the town. The population density was 1,050.3 inhabitants per square mile (405.5/km^{2}). There were 834 housing units at an average density of 627.5 per square mile (242.3/km^{2}). The racial makeup of the town was 92.91% White, 5.52% African American, 0.07% Native American, 0.14% Asian, 0.07% Pacific Islander, 0.14% from other races, and 1.15% from two or more races. Hispanic or Latino of any race were 0.86% of the population.

There were 654 households, out of which 23.1% had children under the age of 18 living with them, 47.6% were married couples living together, 11.9% had a female householder with no husband present, and 37.5% were non-families. 32.4% of all households were made up of individuals, and 19.7% had someone living alone who was 65 years of age or older. The average household size was 2.13 and the average family size was 2.67.

In the town, the population was spread out, with 19.8% under the age of 18, 5.5% from 18 to 24, 21.3% from 25 to 44, 29.5% from 45 to 64, and 23.9% who were 65 years of age or older. The median age was 47 years. For every 100 females, there were 87.1 males. For every 100 females age 18 and over, there were 84.2 males.

The median income for a household in the town was $32,833, and the median income for a family was $38,672. Males had a median income of $29,375 versus $21,429 for females. The per capita income for the town was $20,521. About 10.5% of families and 13.2% of the population were below the poverty line, including 22.4% of those under age 18 and 10.0% of those age 65 or over.

== Economy ==
A variety of retail shops are located on Main Street. Oyster collection, crabbing and fishing contribute to the economy as do charter boats for fishing trips. Tourism is also a source of income, particularly over the summer months and on special events weekends such as the Pirates and Wenches Weekend. It is also a center in the area for July 4 celebrations.

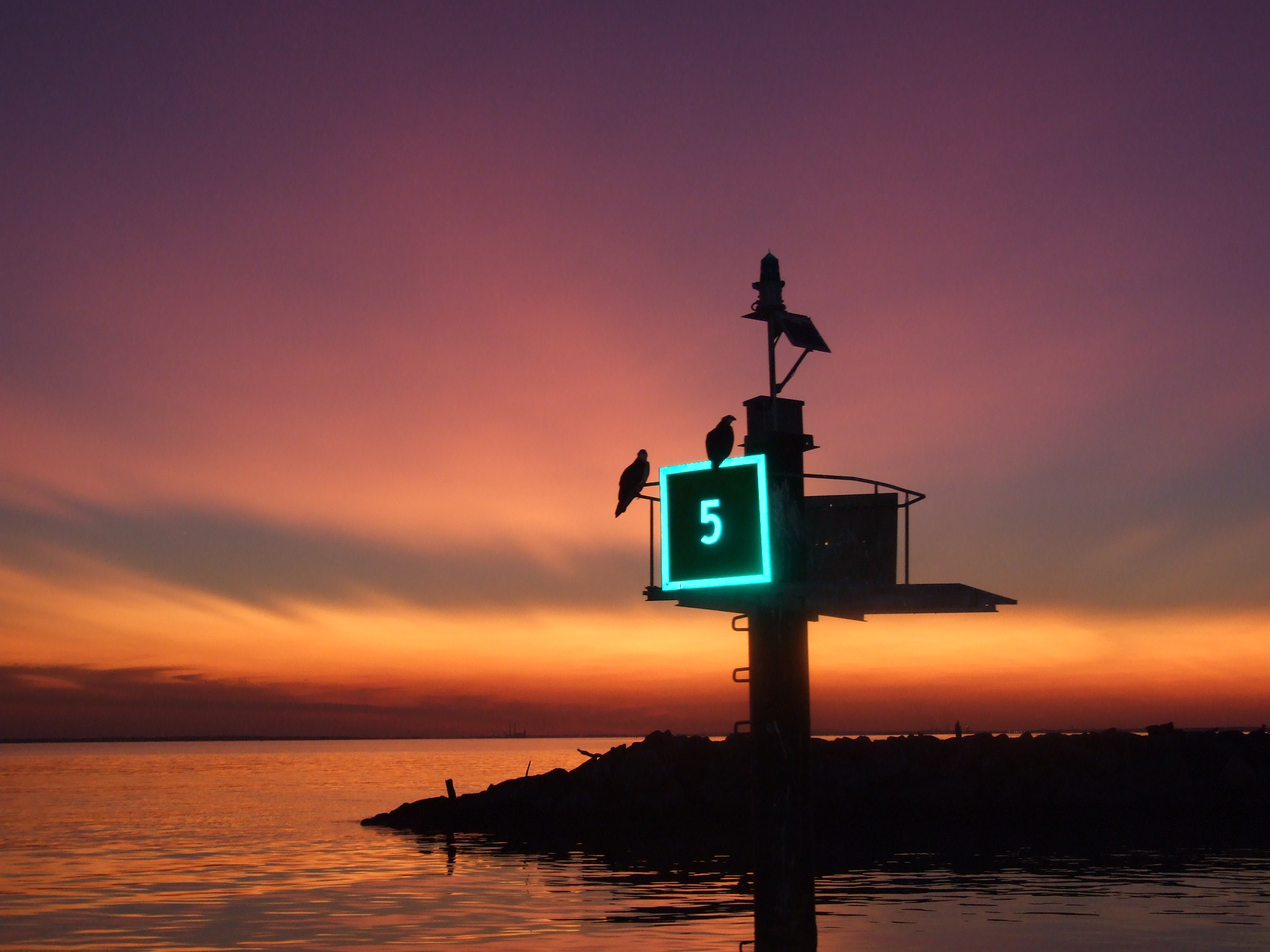
Entrance Mark to Harbor

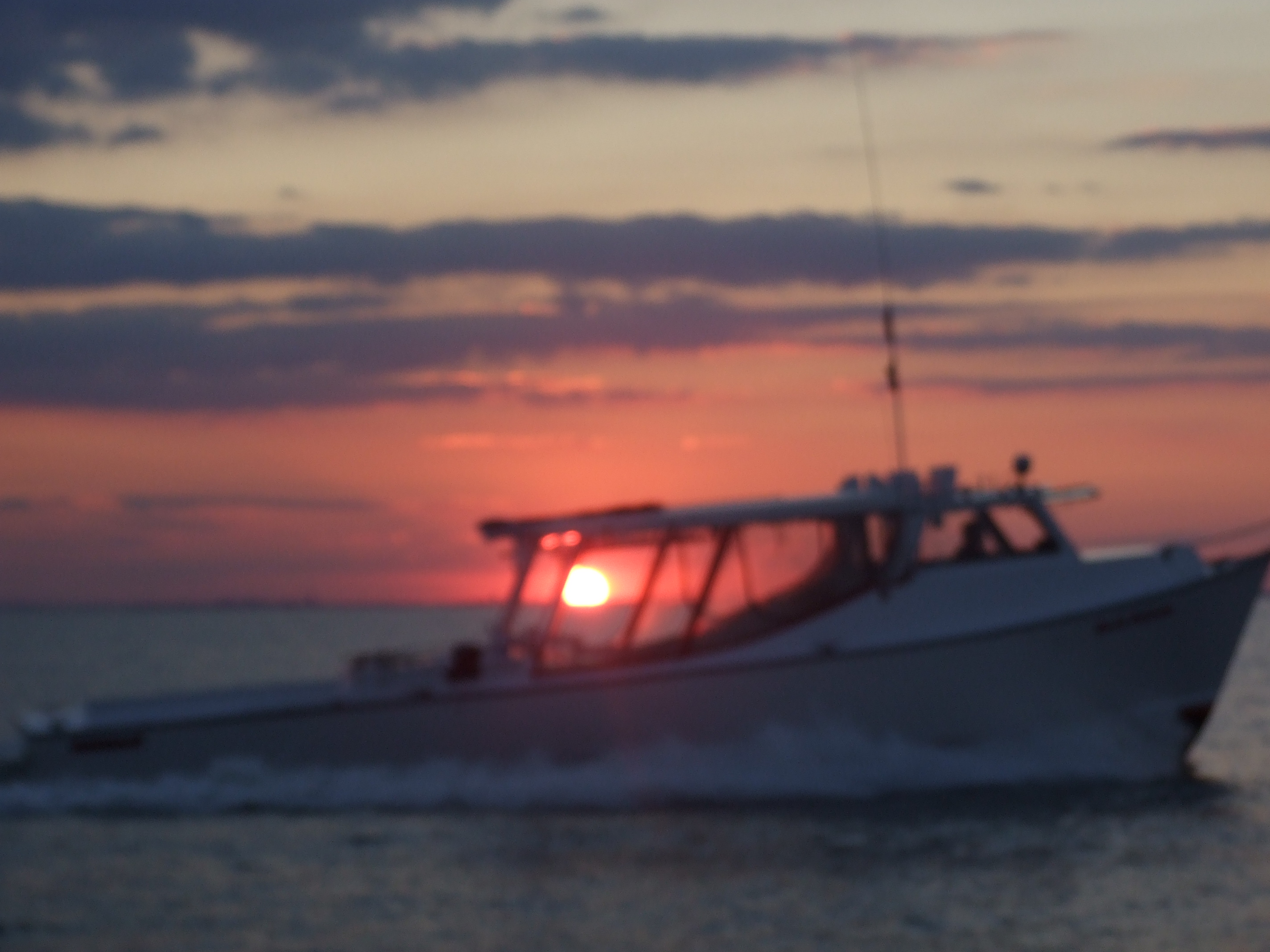
Fishing boat returning with catch

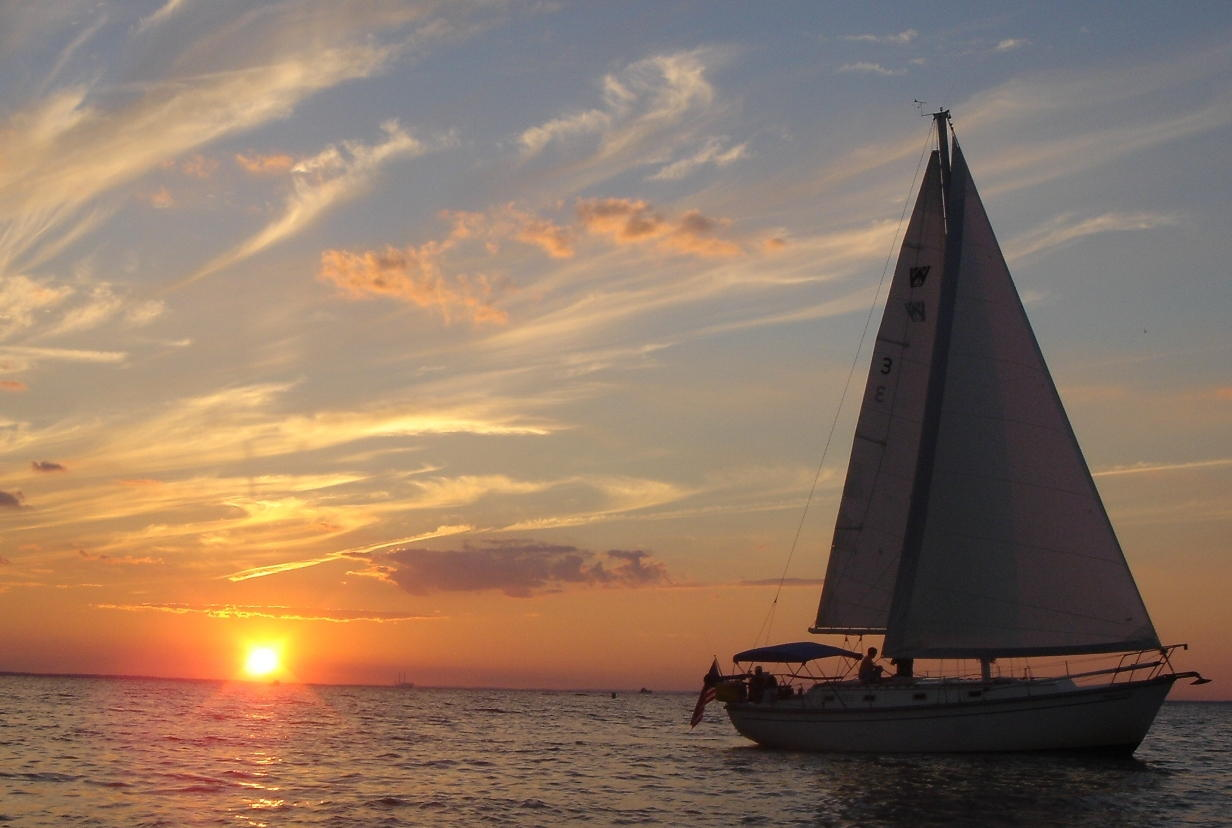
Scenic Sunset Cruise

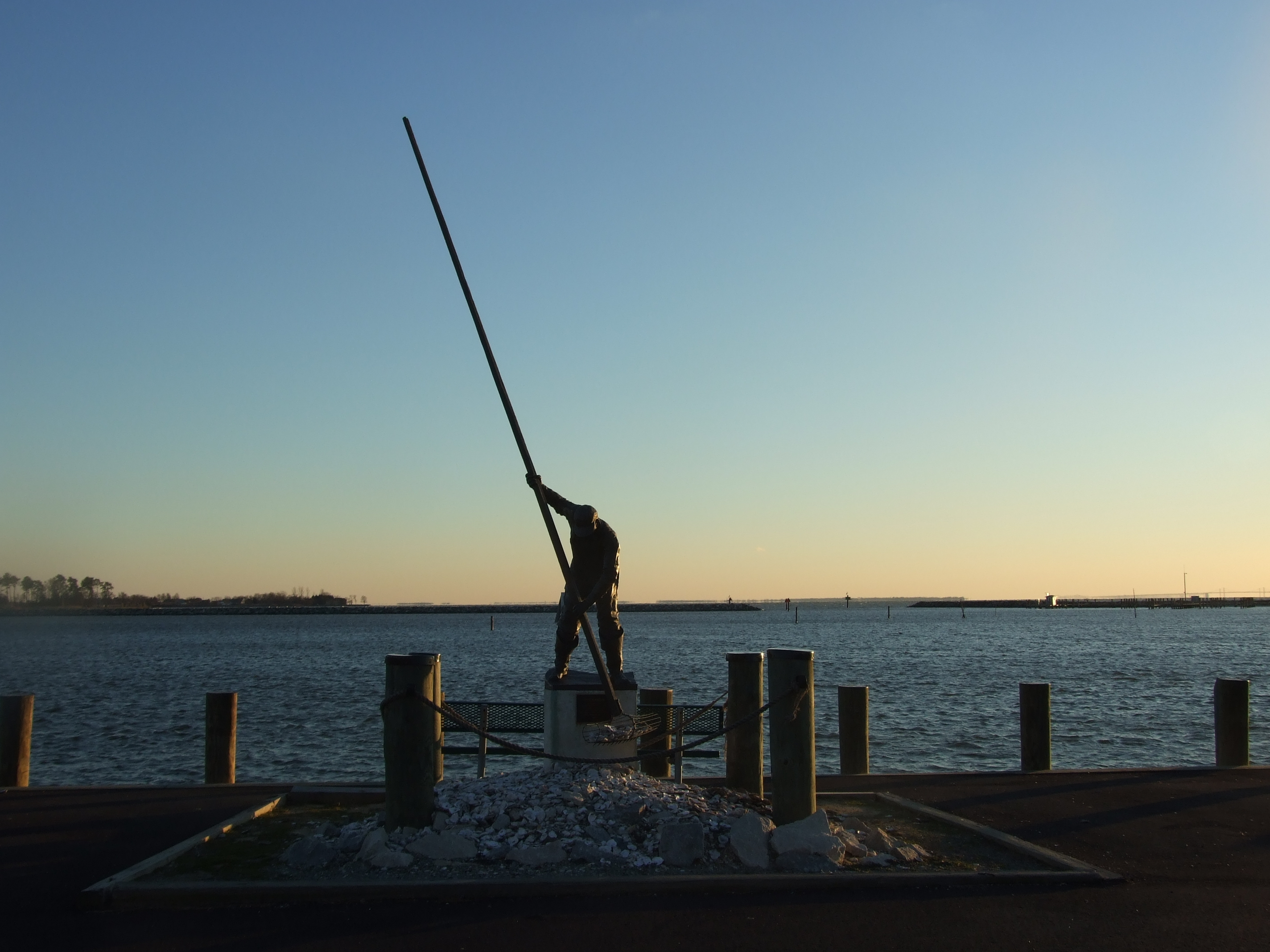
Rock Hall Oysterman

== Government ==
The town has a Weak Mayor-Council-Manager form of government. As of 2023, the mayor is James Cook.

== Education ==
It is in the Kent County Public Schools. Rock Hall Elementary School is in the town. Kent County Middle School is in Chestertown, and Kent County High School is in an unincorporated area with a Worton postal address.

The former Rock Hall Middle School consolidated into Kent County Middle in Chestertown in 2010.

Kent County Public Library maintains the Rock Hall branch.

== Notable people ==
- Lambert Wickes (1735–1777), captain in the Continental Navy
- Wylie F. L. Tuttle (died 2002), real estate developer responsible for the development of Tour Montparnasse built his residence there
