= Kent County, Maryland =

County in Maryland, United States

- County
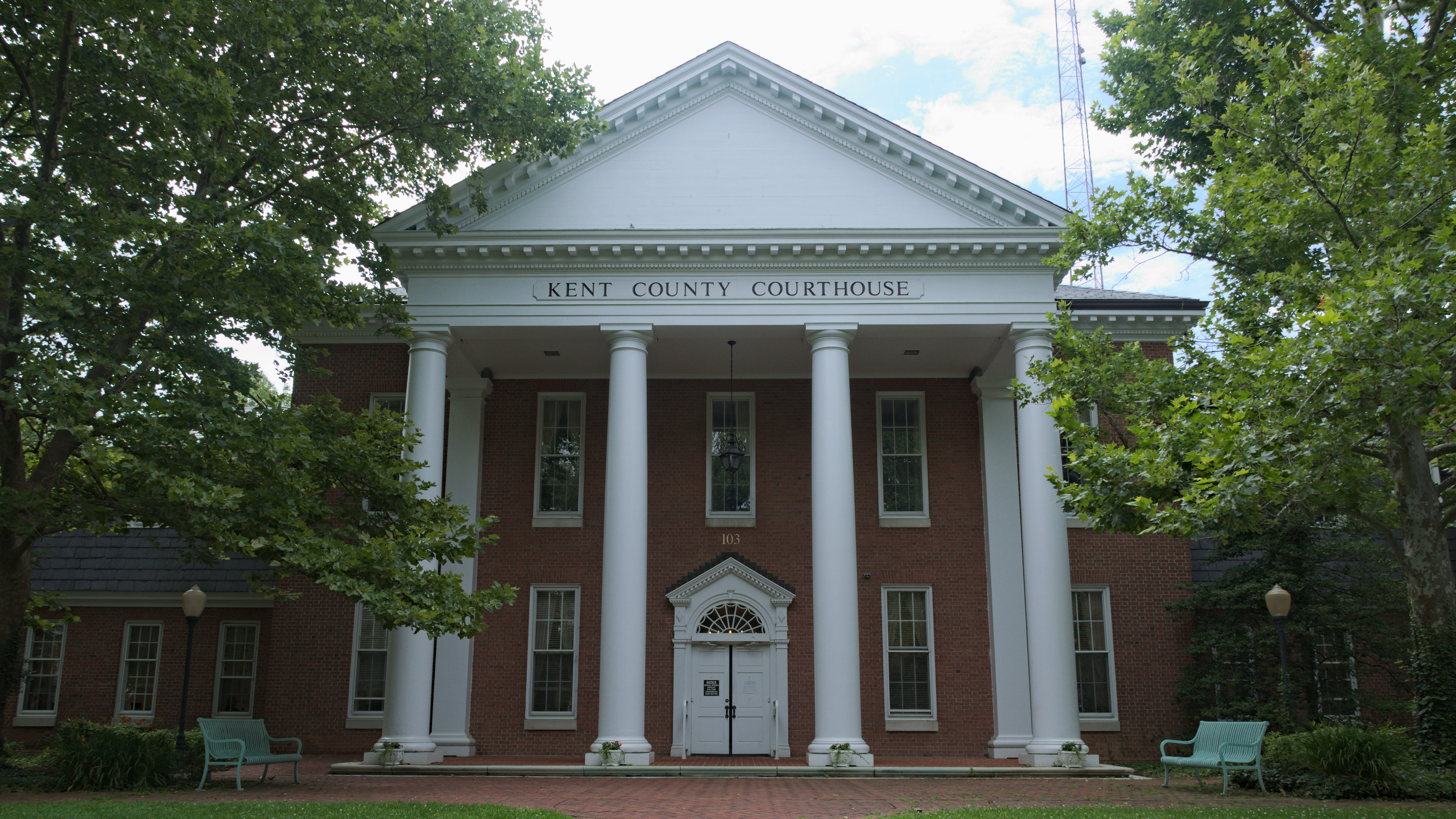
- Kent County Courthouse in Chestertown

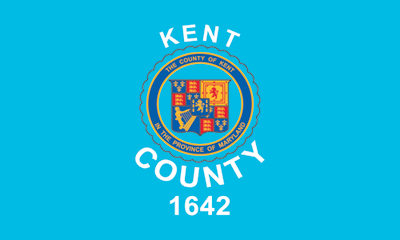
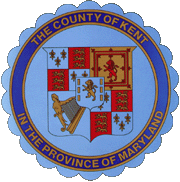
- Flag Seal

- Location within the U.S. state of Maryland
- Coordinates: 39°14′N 76°06′W
- Country: United States
- State: Maryland
- Founded: December 30, 1642
- Named for: Kent
- Seat: Chestertown
- Largest town: Chestertown

Area
  - Total: 413 sq mi (1,070 km^{2})
  - Land: 277 sq mi (720 km^{2})
  - Water: 136 sq mi (350 km^{2}) 33%

Population (2020)
  - Total: 19,198
  - Estimate (2025): 19,565 ▲
  - Density: 69.3/sq mi (26.8/km^{2})
- Time zone: UTC−5 (Eastern)
  - Summer (DST): UTC−4 (EDT)
- Congressional district: 1st
- Website: kentcounty.com

Kent County is a county located in the U.S. state of Maryland. As of the 2020 census, its population was 19,198, making it the least populous county in Maryland. Its county seat is Chestertown. The county was named for the county of Kent in England. The county is part of the Mid-Eastern Shore region of the state.

Along with Caroline and Garrett Counties, it is one of three counties in the state that are not part of a metropolitan statistical area.

== History ==
Indigenous peoples have lived in what is now Kent County for thousands of years. At the time of European colonization, the primary tribe on the Eastern Shore was the Nanticoke. In Nanticoke oral tradition, their ancestors migrated south from "the land of snow and ice" through the Ohio Valley and the Allegheny Mountains until they reached the Eastern Shore. The Nanticokes spoke an Algonquian language.

In 1608, Captain John Smith explored and mapped a portion of what is now Kent County. In 1642, the governor and council appointed commissioners for the Isle and County of Kent. This act appears to have led to the establishment of Kent County. In 1675, the first county seat was New Yarmouth. The seat was briefly moved upriver to Quaker Neck, and then to the site of modern Chestertown. Before the American Revolution, New Town on Chester, now Chestertown, was a port entry for the counties of Cecil, Kent, and Queen Anne's.

The county has a number of properties which are listed on the National Register of Historic Places.

Kent County was the mean center of U.S. population in the 1790 census.

In 1793, the county had its first newspaper, called Apollo, or Chestertown Spy. It was succeeded by local papers such as the Chestertown Gazette.

Washington College, the oldest college in Maryland, is located in Kent County. It was the first college charted in the nation after the Declaration of Independence and was founded by William Smith in 1782. George Washington authorized the use of his name and gave the college its largest gift of 50 guineas. Washington served on the Board of Visitors and Governors for five years. The college has been host to four United States Presidents, including George Washington, Harry S. Truman, Dwight D. Eisenhower, and Franklin D. Roosevelt. All were awarded honorary degrees from the college.

=== War of 1812 ===
The War of 1812 was the only war Kent County experienced on its soil. During the spring and summer of both 1813 and 1814, residents faced immediate threats from the enemy as the British terrorized the Chesapeake, looting and burning farms and towns. Kent County citizens and local militia were tested and stood their ground with ingenuity and determination during the burning of Georgetown, the rescue of the Kitty Knight House and the Battle of Caulk's Field.

== Historical churches ==
St. Paul's, the oldest Episcopal Church in Maryland used continuously as a place of worship. The earliest part of the building was constructed in 1711. It is located approximately nine miles west of Chestertown.

Christ Church, frequently called I.U., was founded in 1765. Colonel Philip Reed a Continental Army and War of 1812 soldier is buried here.

Shrewsbury Church is believed to be the first structure erected in the county, in 1693. John Cadwalader is buried in the Shrewsbury churchyard. The eulogy on his tomb was written by Thomas Paine.

== Politics and government ==
Kent County was granted home rule in 1970 under a state code.

In the early post-Civil War era, Kent County was heavily Confederate-leaning and leaned towards the Democratic Party. William McKinley was the only Republican to carry the county between 1876 and 1924. After that, although carried by Franklin Roosevelt and Harry Truman during the five consecutive Democratic victories between 1932 and 1948, the county trended Republican relative to national voting. Currently, along with Talbot County further south, Kent County is the most politically competitive county on the Eastern Shore of Maryland. In 2004, Republican George W. Bush won it with 52.8% of the vote to Democrat John Kerry's 46.1%. In the 2008 United States Presidential Election, Barack Obama won Kent County by 48 votes more than John McCain. In 2012, Republican Mitt Romney won Kent County by 28 votes over Democrat Barack Obama. In 2016, Republican Donald Trump won Kent County with 48.7% of the vote to Democrat Hillary Clinton's 45.7%, and a 20-year record high of 5.7% of the vote for third-party candidates. In 2020, Joe Biden flipped the county, winning it by 134 votes. In 2024, the county voted for Trump again, this time over Kamala Harris.

The members of the County Council as of 2022 are:

Kent County Commissioners
| Position | Name | Affiliation | District | First Elected |
|---|---|---|---|---|
| President | Ronald H. Fithian | Republican | At Large | 2006 |
| Member | Albert H. Nickerson | Republican | At Large | 2022 |
| Member | John F. Price | Republican | At Large | 2022 |

Kent County lies wholly in Senate District 36 and elects three House of Delegates Members who serve at-large countywide. Members listed below as of 2018 are:

State Senators and Delegates
| Position | District | Name | Affiliation | First Elected |
|---|---|---|---|---|
| Senate | 36 | Steve Hershey | Republican | 2012 |
| House of Delegates | 36A | Steven Arentz | Republican | 2013 |
| House of Delegates | 36B | Jefferson Ghrist | Republican | 2014 |
| House of Delegates | 36C | Jay A. Jacobs | Republican | 2010 |

=== Voter registration ===
Voter registration and party enrollment as of March 2024
| Democratic | 5,770 | 41.05% |
| Republican | 5,297 | 37.68% |
| Unaffiliated | 2,778 | 19.76% |
| Libertarian | 69 | 0.49% |
| Other parties | 143 | 1.02% |
| Total | 14,057 | 100% |

United States presidential election results for Kent County, Maryland
| Year | Republican | | Democratic | | Third party(ies) | |
| Year | No. | % | No. | % | No. | % |
|---|---|---|---|---|---|---|
| 1836 | 589 | 61.61% | 367 | 38.39% | 0 | 0.00% |
| 1840 | 679 | 58.79% | 476 | 41.21% | 0 | 0.00% |
| 1844 | 728 | 58.01% | 527 | 41.99% | 0 | 0.00% |
| 1848 | 645 | 58.90% | 447 | 40.82% | 3 | 0.27% |
| 1852 | 662 | 54.58% | 551 | 45.42% | 0 | 0.00% |
| 1856 | 0 | 0.00% | 550 | 39.77% | 833 | 60.23% |
| 1860 | 42 | 2.53% | 74 | 4.45% | 1,546 | 93.02% |
| 1864 | 413 | 24.55% | 1,269 | 75.45% | 0 | 0.00% |
| 1868 | 266 | 16.65% | 1,332 | 83.35% | 0 | 0.00% |
| 1872 | 1,658 | 50.53% | 1,623 | 49.47% | 0 | 0.00% |
| 1876 | 1,685 | 46.52% | 1,937 | 53.48% | 0 | 0.00% |
| 1880 | 1,853 | 48.48% | 1,969 | 51.52% | 0 | 0.00% |
| 1884 | 2,048 | 48.22% | 2,152 | 50.67% | 47 | 1.11% |
| 1888 | 2,037 | 48.64% | 2,062 | 49.24% | 89 | 2.13% |
| 1892 | 1,886 | 47.27% | 2,009 | 50.35% | 95 | 2.38% |
| 1896 | 2,399 | 53.73% | 1,980 | 44.34% | 86 | 1.93% |
| 1900 | 2,426 | 53.05% | 2,076 | 45.40% | 71 | 1.55% |
| 1904 | 1,841 | 47.91% | 1,956 | 50.90% | 46 | 1.20% |
| 1908 | 1,753 | 46.98% | 1,939 | 51.97% | 39 | 1.05% |
| 1912 | 1,021 | 30.21% | 1,816 | 53.73% | 543 | 16.07% |
| 1916 | 1,673 | 46.38% | 1,886 | 52.29% | 48 | 1.33% |
| 1920 | 2,838 | 48.22% | 3,034 | 51.55% | 14 | 0.24% |
| 1924 | 2,019 | 42.51% | 2,628 | 55.34% | 102 | 2.15% |
| 1928 | 2,777 | 52.82% | 2,450 | 46.60% | 30 | 0.57% |
| 1932 | 1,468 | 38.09% | 2,370 | 61.49% | 16 | 0.42% |
| 1936 | 2,543 | 46.18% | 2,931 | 53.22% | 33 | 0.60% |
| 1940 | 2,639 | 46.45% | 3,014 | 53.05% | 28 | 0.49% |
| 1944 | 2,351 | 48.93% | 2,454 | 51.07% | 0 | 0.00% |
| 1948 | 2,489 | 49.31% | 2,524 | 50.00% | 35 | 0.69% |
| 1952 | 3,656 | 59.24% | 2,504 | 40.58% | 11 | 0.18% |
| 1956 | 3,747 | 61.18% | 2,378 | 38.82% | 0 | 0.00% |
| 1960 | 3,264 | 51.46% | 3,079 | 48.54% | 0 | 0.00% |
| 1964 | 2,008 | 32.81% | 4,113 | 67.19% | 0 | 0.00% |
| 1968 | 2,946 | 46.50% | 2,243 | 35.41% | 1,146 | 18.09% |
| 1972 | 4,036 | 64.36% | 2,168 | 34.57% | 67 | 1.07% |
| 1976 | 2,821 | 46.77% | 3,211 | 53.23% | 0 | 0.00% |
| 1980 | 2,889 | 45.83% | 2,986 | 47.37% | 429 | 6.81% |
| 1984 | 3,897 | 61.63% | 2,390 | 37.80% | 36 | 0.57% |
| 1988 | 3,761 | 55.87% | 2,925 | 43.45% | 46 | 0.68% |
| 1992 | 3,094 | 40.56% | 3,093 | 40.55% | 1,441 | 18.89% |
| 1996 | 3,055 | 43.66% | 3,207 | 45.83% | 736 | 10.52% |
| 2000 | 4,155 | 51.39% | 3,627 | 44.86% | 303 | 3.75% |
| 2004 | 4,900 | 52.77% | 4,278 | 46.07% | 107 | 1.15% |
| 2008 | 4,905 | 48.95% | 4,953 | 49.43% | 162 | 1.62% |
| 2012 | 4,870 | 49.17% | 4,842 | 48.89% | 192 | 1.94% |
| 2016 | 4,876 | 48.66% | 4,575 | 45.65% | 570 | 5.69% |
| 2020 | 5,195 | 48.13% | 5,329 | 49.37% | 270 | 2.50% |
| 2024 | 5,561 | 49.97% | 5,251 | 47.19% | 316 | 2.84% |

=== Law enforcement ===
The Kent County Sheriff is Dennis Hickman.

== Geography ==
According to the U.S. Census Bureau, the county has a total area of 413 square miles (1,070 km^{2}), of which 277 square miles (720 km^{2}) is land and 136 square miles (350 km^{2}) (33%) is water.

According to the Maryland Geological Survey, the highest point in Kent County is 102 ft above sea level, approximately 2.25 mi west of Coleman's Corner (shown on maps as "Coleman"), just northeast of the mouth of Still Pond Creek.

Kent County has a 209-mile shoreline, including Eastern Neck Island. The Chesapeake Bay is on the west, Sassafras River on the north, and the Chester River on the south. The eastern border with Delaware is part of the Mason–Dixon line.

Nearby cities: Baltimore, MD; Washington D.C.; Philadelphia, PA; Wilmington, DE

=== Adjacent counties ===
- Cecil County (north)
- New Castle County, Delaware (northeast)
- Queen Anne's County (south)
- Kent County, Delaware (southeast)

=== National protected area ===
- Eastern Neck National Wildlife Refuge

=== Major roads and highways ===
- US 301
- MD 20
- MD 21
- MD 213
- MD 288
- MD 289
- MD 290
- MD 291
- MD 292
- MD 297
- MD 298
- MD 299
- MD 313
- MD 330
- MD 444
- MD 445
- MD 446
- MD 447
- MD 514
- MD 561
- MD 566
- MD 674
- MD 855

== Demographics ==
Historical population
| Census | Pop. | Note | %± |
|---|---|---|---|
| 1790 | 12,836 | | — |
| 1800 | 11,771 | | −8.3% |
| 1810 | 11,450 | | −2.7% |
| 1820 | 11,453 | | 0.0% |
| 1830 | 10,501 | | −8.3% |
| 1840 | 10,842 | | 3.2% |
| 1850 | 11,386 | | 5.0% |
| 1860 | 13,267 | | 16.5% |
| 1870 | 17,102 | | 28.9% |
| 1880 | 17,605 | | 2.9% |
| 1890 | 17,471 | | −0.8% |
| 1900 | 18,786 | | 7.5% |
| 1910 | 16,957 | | −9.7% |
| 1920 | 15,026 | | −11.4% |
| 1930 | 14,242 | | −5.2% |
| 1940 | 13,465 | | −5.5% |
| 1950 | 13,677 | | 1.6% |
| 1960 | 15,481 | | 13.2% |
| 1970 | 16,146 | | 4.3% |
| 1980 | 16,695 | | 3.4% |
| 1990 | 17,842 | | 6.9% |
| 2000 | 19,197 | | 7.6% |
| 2010 | 20,197 | | 5.2% |
| 2020 | 19,198 | | −4.9% |
| 2025 (est.) | 19,565 | ▲ | 1.9% |
U.S. Decennial Census; 1790–1960 1900–1990; 1990–2000 2010–2018

=== Racial and ethnic composition ===
Kent County, Maryland – Racial and ethnic composition Note: the US Census treats Hispanic/Latino as an ethnic category. This table excludes Latinos from the racial categories and assigns them to a separate category. Hispanics/Latinos may be of any race.
| Race / Ethnicity (NH = Non-Hispanic) | Pop 1980 | Pop 1990 | Pop 2000 | Pop 2010 | Pop 2020 | % 1980 | % 1990 | % 2000 | % 2010 | % 2020 |
|---|---|---|---|---|---|---|---|---|---|---|
| White alone (NH) | 12,820 | 13,775 | 15,050 | 15,783 | 14,384 | 76.79% | 77.21% | 78.40% | 78.15% | 74.92% |
| Black or African American alone (NH) | 3,642 | 3,515 | 3,317 | 3,003 | 2,751 | 21.81% | 19.70% | 17.28% | 14.87% | 14.33% |
| Native American or Alaska Native alone (NH) | 21 | 19 | 25 | 23 | 24 | 0.13% | 0.11% | 0.13% | 0.11% | 0.13% |
| Asian alone (NH) | 30 | 62 | 103 | 157 | 250 | 0.18% | 0.35% | 0.54% | 0.78% | 1.30% |
| Native Hawaiian or Pacific Islander alone (NH) | x | x | 8 | 3 | 0 | x | x | 0.04% | 0.01% | 0.00% |
| Other race alone (NH) | 0 | 4 | 17 | 18 | 62 | 0.00% | 0.02% | 0.09% | 0.09% | 0.32% |
| Mixed race or Multiracial (NH) | x | x | 131 | 303 | 666 | x | x | 0.68% | 1.50% | 3.47% |
| Hispanic or Latino (any race) | 182 | 467 | 546 | 907 | 1,061 | 1.09% | 2.62% | 2.84% | 4.49% | 5.53% |
| Total | 16,695 | 17,842 | 19,197 | 20,197 | 19,198 | 100.00% | 100.00% | 100.00% | 100.00% | 100.00% |

=== 2020 census ===
As of the 2020 census, the county had a population of 19,198. The median age was 49.2 years, with 15.8% of residents under the age of 18 and 27.3% aged 65 or older. For every 100 females there were 92.2 males, and for every 100 females age 18 and over there were 90.2 males; 30.4% of residents lived in urban areas while 69.6% lived in rural areas.

The racial makeup of the county was 75.9% White, 14.6% Black or African American, 0.2% American Indian and Alaska Native, 1.3% Asian, 0.0% Native Hawaiian and Pacific Islander, 2.3% from some other race, and 5.6% from two or more races. Hispanic or Latino residents of any race comprised 5.5% of the population.

There were 8,075 households in the county, of which 22.4% had children under the age of 18 living with them and 29.2% had a female householder with no spouse or partner present. About 31.5% of all households were made up of individuals and 17.9% had someone living alone who was 65 years of age or older.

There were 10,286 housing units, of which 21.5% were vacant. Among occupied housing units, 70.5% were owner-occupied and 29.5% were renter-occupied. The homeowner vacancy rate was 2.7% and the rental vacancy rate was 7.1%.

=== 2010 census ===
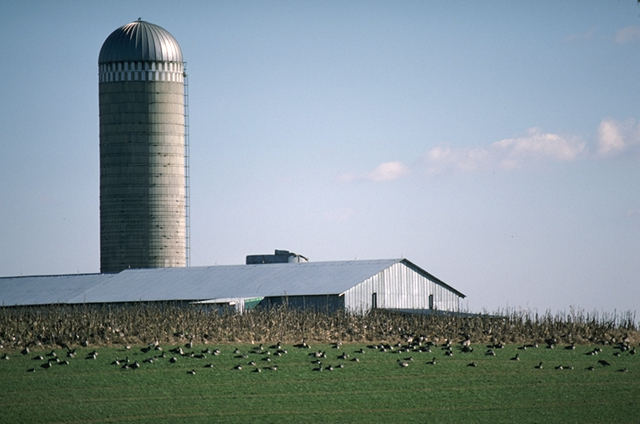
A farm in Kent County, Maryland

As of the 2010 U.S. census, there were 20,197 people, 8,165 households, and 5,272 families living in the county. The population density was 72.9 inhabitants per square mile (28.1/km^{2}). There were 10,549 housing units at an average density of 38.1 per square mile (14.7/km^{2}). The racial makeup of the county was 80.1% white, 15.1% black or African American, 0.8% Asian, 0.2% American Indian, 1.9% from other races, and 1.8% from two or more races. Those of Hispanic or Latino origin made up 4.5% of the population. In terms of ancestry, 18.7% were English, 18.7% were German, 15.5% were Irish, 7.9% were American, and 5.8% were Italian.

Of the 8,165 households, 24.4% had children under the age of 18 living with them, 49.2% were married couples living together, 10.9% had a female householder with no husband present, 35.4% were non-families, and 29.6% of all households were made up of individuals. The average household size was 2.29 and the average family size was 2.78. The median age was 45.6 years.

The median income for a household in the county was $50,141 and the median income for a family was $63,507. Males had a median income of $41,046 versus $35,161 for females. The per capita income for the county was $29,536. About 5.1% of families and 12.2% of the population were below the poverty line, including 14.9% of those under age 18 and 7.8% of those age 65 or over.

== Education ==
Kent County Public Schools is the school district for all of Kent County.

- Kent County High School
- Kent County Middle School
- Galena Elementary School
- Judy Center (Pre-school)
- Henry Highland Garnet Elementary School
- Rock Hall Elementary School
- Kent School
- Chestertown Christian Academy
- Echo Hill Outdoor School
- Radcliffe Creek School
- Washington College
- Chesapeake College (supported in part by the county government, but located in Wye Mills, Md.)

== Communities ==
This county contains the following incorporated municipalities:

=== Towns ===
- Betterton
- Chestertown (county seat)
- Galena
- Millington (partly in Queen Anne's County)
- Rock Hall

=== Census-designated places ===
The United States Census Bureau recognizes the following Census-designated places in Kent County:

- Butlertown
- Chesapeake Landing
- Edesville
- Fairlee
- Georgetown (CDP)
- Kennedyville
- Still Pond
- Tolchester
- Worton

=== Unincorporated communities ===
Other unincorporated places not listed as Census-Designated Places but known in the area include:

- Chesterville
- Golts
- Hassengers Corner
- Langford
- Lynch
- Massey
- Pomona
- Sassafras
- Sharpstown
- Tolchester Beach
- Georgetown, northeastern Kent County

== Notable people ==
- John Cadwalader (1742–1786), Quaker commander during the American Revolutionary War
- James M. Cain (1892 – 1977), author, journalist, and professor
- R. Clayton Mitchell Jr. (1936 – 2019), Speaker of the Maryland House of Delegates, 1986–1993. President of the Kent County Commissioners, 1966–1970. Member of the Maryland House of Delegates, 1970–1993
- John Needles (1786 – 1878), Quaker abolitionist and a master craftsman of fine furniture
- Captain Lambert Wickes, senior officer in the Continental Navy during the Revolutionary War, who took Benjamin Franklin to France in 1777

== Miscellaneous ==
- The county's daily newspaper is Kent County News.
- Kent County Public Schools were some of the last in the country to fully integrate. The federal government stepped up pressure and required a formal plan of integration, which was adopted in 1966. In 1967, there was full and complete integration in Kent County. Construction plans delayed the opening the desegregated high school which opened in the fall of 1971. In 1971, all pupils, regardless of race, reported to the modern high school in Worton. All grades in the Kent County system were integrated before the opening of the centrally located high school.
- Kent County, Maryland, is one of the few counties in the United States to border its namesake in another state—in this case, Kent County, Delaware.
- In 1790, Kent County contained the centre of population of the United States, according to the US Census Bureau. It is on the edge of a cornfield at 39.16.30 N 76.11.12 W.
- Tolchester Beach Amusement Park founded in 1877 by the Tolchester Steamboat Company. As many as 20,000 people visited the resort on summer weekends. It was served by 6 steamers and a ferry. There games of skill and chance and harness racing on a track within the park borders. Included on the grounds were a hotel, pavilion and bathing beach It grew from 10 acres to 155. It was closed in 1962.
- The Kent County Railroad Company was formed in 1856. The line was bought by the Pennsylvania Railroad in 1903. The railroads' s primary importance was a means to ship local product to t eastern markets. The railroad continued to operate until early 1970.
- Chestertown Fountain Park, the fountain in the park was manufactured by Robert Wood & Company in Philadelphia. It was purchased by the Ladies Improvement Society in 1899 and installed in the Park. The figure of Hebe, goddess of youth and beauty stands atop the fountain.

== See also ==
- National Register of Historic Places listings in Kent County, Maryland
