= Maryland Route 146 =

State highway in Maryland, US

Maryland Route 146
- Maryland Route 146 highlighted inred

Route information
- Maintained by MDSHA
- Length: 16.81 mi (27.05 km)
- Existed: 1928–present
- Tourist routes: Horses and Hounds Scenic Byway

Major junctions
- South end: MD 45 in Towson
- I-695 in Towson; MD 145 in Jacksonville; MD 152 in Taylor
- North end: MD 23 near Jarrettsville

Location
- Country: United States
- State: Maryland
- Counties: Baltimore, Harford

Highway system
- Maryland highway system; Interstate; US; State; Scenic Byways
← MD 145	→ MD 147

Maryland Route 146 (MD 146) is a state highway in the U.S. state of Maryland. The state highway runs 16.81 miles (27.05 km) from MD 45 in Towson north to MD 23 near Jarrettsville. MD 146 connects Towson with Loch Raven Reservoir, an impoundment of Gunpowder Falls. The state highway also serves the northern Baltimore County community of Jacksonville and Jarrettsville in western Harford County. MD 146 was constructed as two different state highways on either side of Loch Raven Reservoir. The section of the state highway in Towson was built in the 1910s and the portion through Jacksonville to Jarrettsville was constructed in the late 1920s and early 1930s. The gap in MD 146 through Loch Raven Reservoir was filled in two steps of maintenance swaps in the early 1960s and late 1970s.

== Route description ==
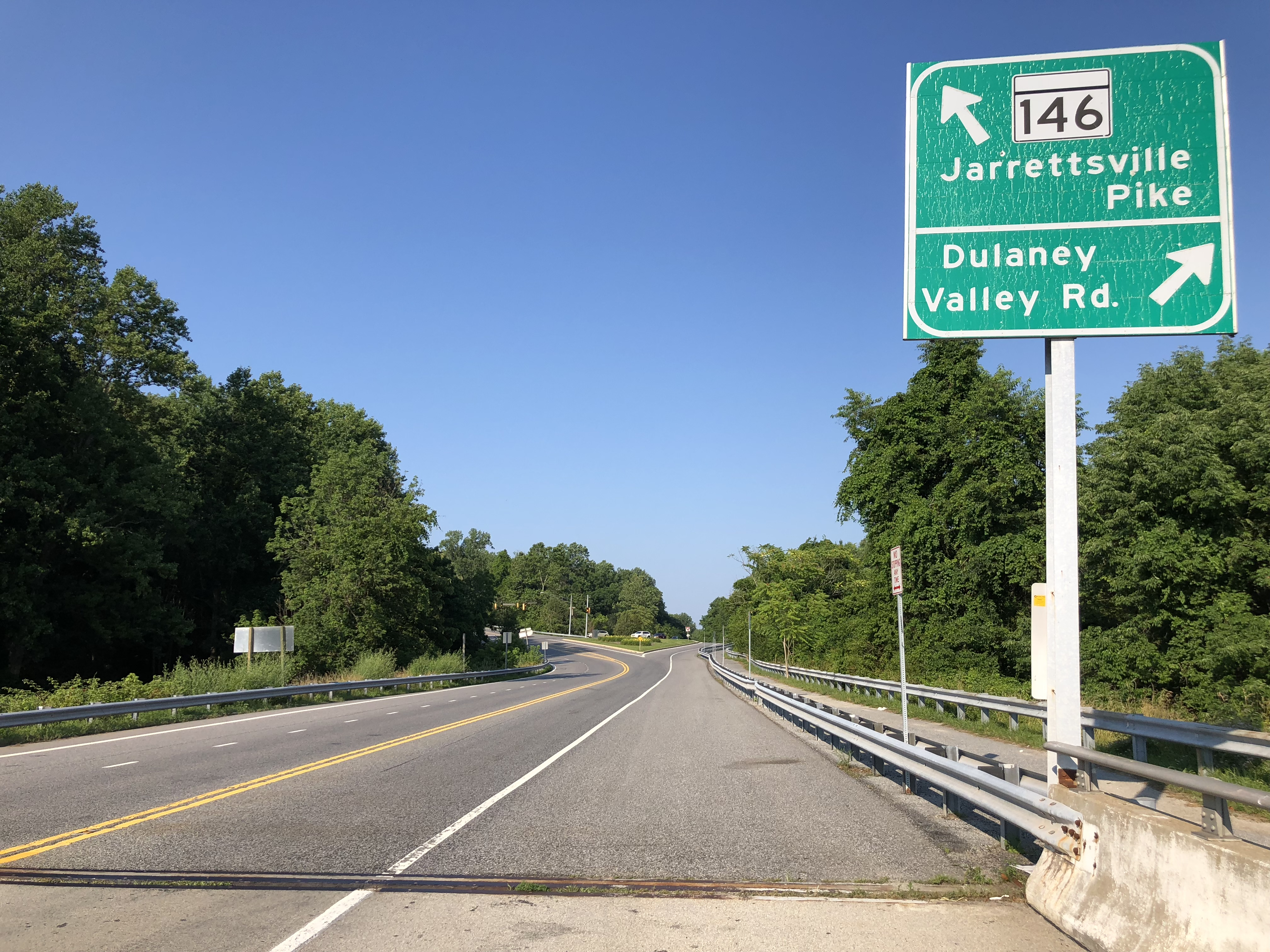
MD 146 northbound at the split with Dulaney Valley Road in Baltimore County

MD 146 begins at the Towson Roundabout, a five-leg, racetrack-shaped roundabout in the center of Towson. The roundabout also features MD 45 (York Road), which heads south toward Baltimore and northwest toward Lutherville, and Joppa Road, a county-maintained highway that runs west toward Brooklandville and east toward Parkville. MD 146 heads northeast as Dulaney Valley Road, a four-lane divided boulevard that passes along the west side of the Towson Town Center shopping mall and the campus of Goucher College. The state highway meets Interstate 695 (Baltimore Beltway) at a partial cloverleaf interchange. The ramp from the westbound Beltway to MD 146 connects via Hampton Lane, which heads east past Towson United Methodist Church toward Hampton National Historic Site. North of the Beltway, MD 146 is a five-lane road with a center left-turn lane that passes between the suburbs of Hampton to the east and Lutherville to the west. MD 146 reduces to two lanes just north of Pot Spring Road and its traversal of Long Quarter Branch, which flows into Loch Raven Reservoir. The state highway passes between Timonium to the west and the reservoir parkland on the east.

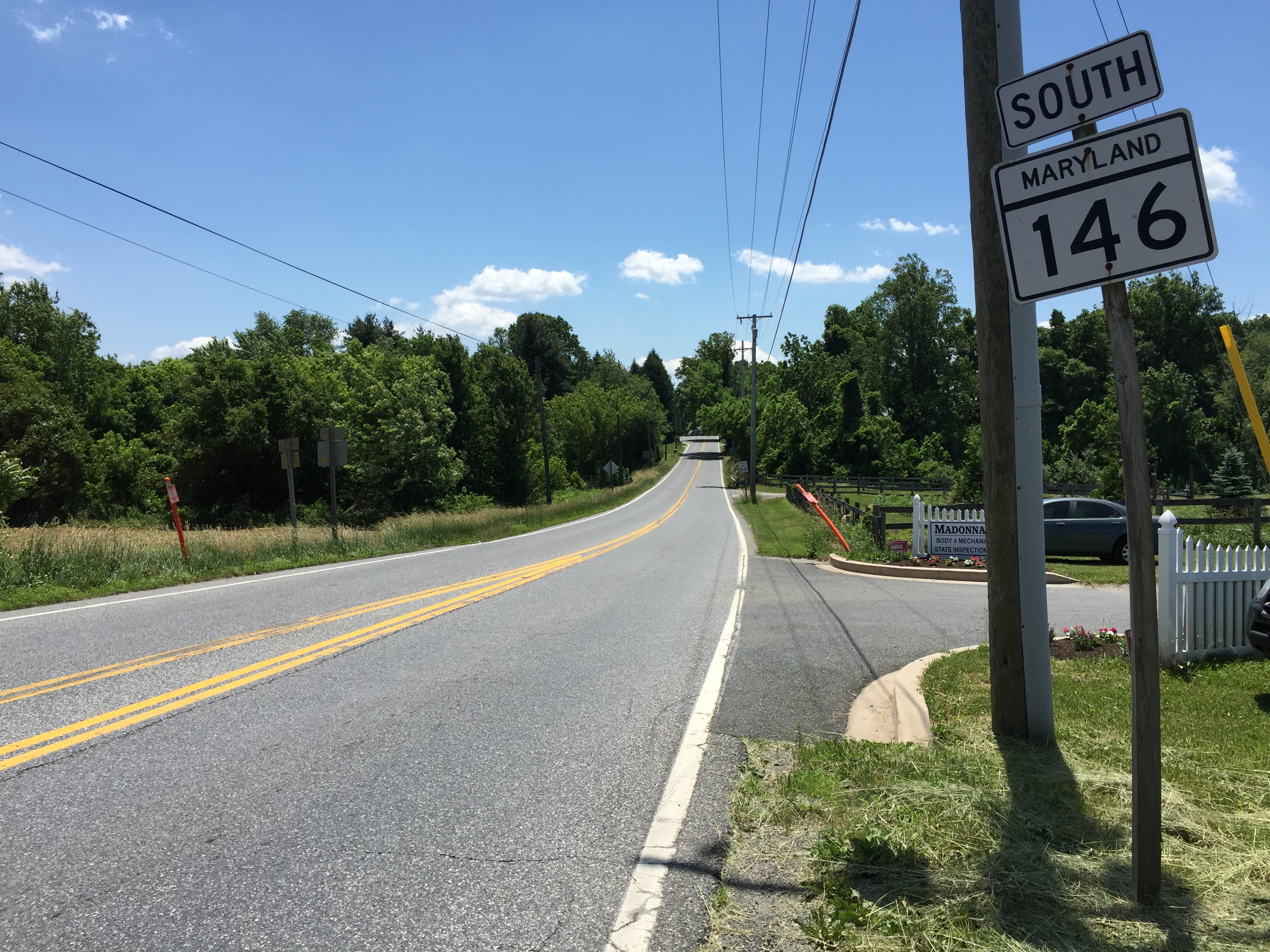
View south from the north end of MD 146 at MD 23 near Jarrettsville

North of Timonium Road, MD 146 fully enters Loch Raven Reservoir Park. At Old Bosley Road, the state highway curves east and crosses the reservoir. Just east of the bridge, Dulaney Valley Road continues east while MD 146 veers north as Jarrettsville Pike. The state highway passes by the historic home Eagle's Nest as it leaves the reservoir valley. MD 146 intersects Sunnybrook Road and Merrymans Mill Road in the hamlet of Sunnybrook before passing through Jacksonville, a community also known as Phoenix that is centered at the highway's intersection with MD 145. MD 145 heads east as Sweet Air Road toward Baldwin and west as Paper Mill Road toward Cockeysville. North of Jacksonville, MD 146 crosses Little Gunpowder Falls into Harford County. The state highway passes through the communities of Hess and Taylor, where the highway passes west of the Ladew Topiary Gardens and meets the northern end of MD 152 (Fallston Road). MD 146 reaches its northern terminus at its intersection with MD 23 (Norrisville Road) in the hamlet of Madonna west of Jarrettsville. The roadway continues north as county-maintained Madonna Road.

MD 146 is a part of the National Highway System as a principal arterial from MD 45 in Towson to MD 145 in Jacksonville.

== History ==
Maryland Route 144
- Location: Towson–Hampton
- Existed: 1927–1940

MD 146's predecessor highways included a pair of turnpikes. The Dulaney's Valley and Towsontown Turnpike connected the Baltimore and Yorktown Turnpike at Towson with Meredith's Ford, a shallow spot in Gunpowder Falls before Loch Raven Reservoir was formed. A pair of turnpikes began east of the ford: the Dulaney's Valley and Sweet Air Turnpike east to the community of Knoebel at what is now the intersection of Dulaney Valley Road and Manor Road, and the Jarrettsville Turnpike north from the ford through Jacksonville to Little Gunpowder Falls. The first section of modern MD 146 was constructed as a 14-foot (4.3 m) wide macadam road from York Road north 0.5 miles (0.80 km) in 1915. This road was resurfaced in concrete and extended to the southern edge of the Loch Raven Reservoir reservation just north of Seminary Road by 1921.

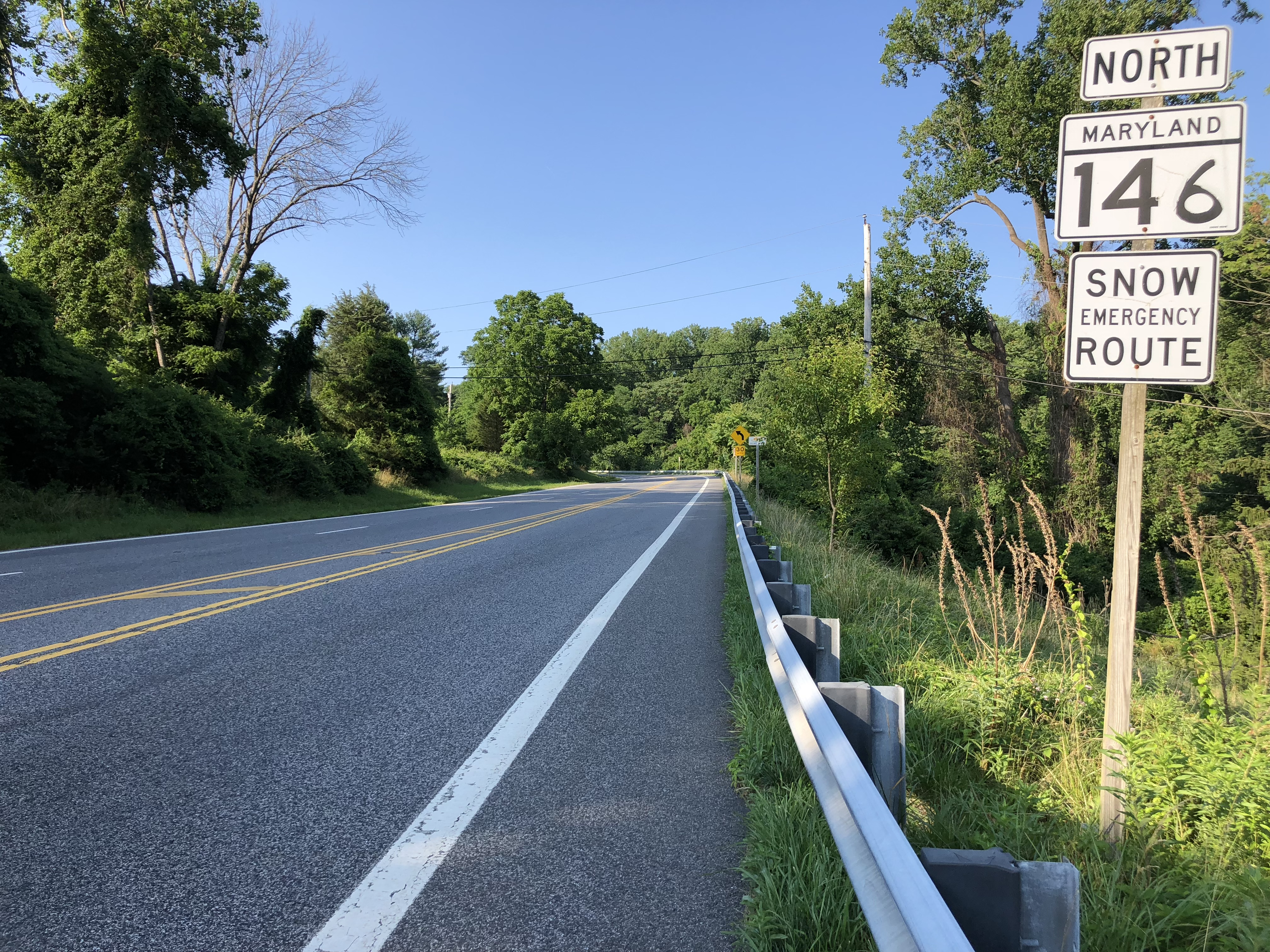
MD 146 northbound at Dulaney Valley Road in Baltimore County

The first portion of MD 146 north of Loch Raven Reservoir was a concrete road from the northern edge of the Loch Raven Reservoir reservation to MD 145 in Jacksonville built in 1928. The state highway was extended north to Little Gunpowder Falls in 1929. The Harford County section of MD 146 was started in 1930 and completed in 1932. An additional section of the state highway was built on Madonna Road from the junction with MD 23 north to Nelson Mill Road in 1939. MD 146 was truncated at MD 23 when the Madonna Road segment was transferred to county maintenance in 1955. The section of the state highway south of Loch Raven Reservoir was originally designated MD 144 but became a disjoint segment of MD 146 by 1940. MD 144 was later reused for bypassed sections of U.S. Route 40 between Cumberland and Baltimore.

The southern segment of MD 146 was widened to 18 feet (5.5 m) in 1946. MD 146 from the center of Towson to the Baltimore Beltway was expanded to a divided highway concurrent with the construction of the highway's cloverleaf interchange with the Beltway between 1955 and 1958. The portions of Dulaney Valley Road and Jarrettsville Pike through the Loch Raven Reservoir reservation were originally maintained by the Baltimore City Department of Transportation since the reservoir is owned by the city of Baltimore. These sections were transferred to state maintenance in two steps. MD 146 was extended north from near Seminary Road to just west of the bridge over the reservoir in 1963. The bridge and the highway to the northern edge of the reservoir reservation were transferred to state maintenance in 1979, closing the gap between the two sections of MD 146.

== Junction list ==
County	Location	mi	km	Destinations	Notes
Baltimore	Towson	0.00	0.00	MD 45 (York Road) / Joppa Road – Baltimore	Towson Roundabout; southern terminus
Baltimore	Towson	0.78	1.26	I-695 (Baltimore Beltway) – Pikesville, Essex	I-695 Exit 27
Baltimore	Loch Raven Reservoir	4.99	8.03	Dulaney Valley Road east	MD 146 continues north as Jarrettsville Pike; Dulaney Valley Road is unsigned MD 146A
Baltimore	Jacksonville	9.24	14.87	MD 145 (Paper Mill Road/Sweet Air Road) – Cockeysville, Baldwin	
Harford	Taylor	15.13	24.35	MD 152 south (Fallston Road) – Fallston	Northern terminus of MD 152
Harford	Jarrettsville	16.81	27.05	MD 23 (Norrisville Road) / Madonna Road north – Norrisville, Bel Air	Northern terminus
1.000 mi = 1.609 km; 1.000 km = 0.621 mi

== Auxiliary route ==
MD 146A is the designation for the 0.22-mile (0.35 km) section of two-lane undivided Dulaney Valley Road immediately east of the road's intersection with MD 146, which is just east of MD 146's bridge over Loch Raven Reservoir. Dulaney Valley Road continues east as a road maintained by the Baltimore City Department of Transportation, which maintains most roads within the park reservation surrounding the reservoir. This section of Dulaney Valley Road was transferred from city to state maintenance in 2009.
