= Maryland Route 45 =

State highway in Maryland, US

Maryland Route 45
- Maryland Route 45 highlighted in red

Route information
- Maintained by MDSHA and Baltimore DOT
- Length: 30.06 mi (48.38 km)
- Existed: 1957–present
- Tourist routes: Horses and Hounds Scenic Byway; Mason and Dixon Scenic Byway

Major junctions
- South end: US 1 / US 40 Truck in Baltimore
- MD 146 in Towson; I-695 in Towson; MD 131 in Lutherville; MD 145 in Cockeysville; MD 138 in Hereford; MD 137 in Hereford; I-83 in Parkton; MD 439 in Maryland Line
- North end: SR 3001 at the Pennsylvania state line in Maryland Line

Location
- Country: United States
- State: Maryland
- Counties: City of Baltimore, Baltimore

Highway system
- Maryland highway system; Interstate; US; State; Scenic Byways
← MD 43	→ MD 47

Maryland Route 45 (MD 45) is a state highway in the U.S. state of Maryland. Known for most of its length as York Road, the state highway runs 30.06 miles (48.38 km) from U.S. Route 1 (US 1)/US 40 Truck in Baltimore north to the Pennsylvania state line in Maryland Line, where the highway continues as State Route 3001 (SR 3001). MD 45 is the primary highway between Downtown Baltimore and Towson, the county seat of Baltimore County. North of Interstate 695 (I-695), the state highway parallels I-83 and serves the suburban communities of Lutherville, Timonium, Cockeysville, and Hunt Valley. MD 45 also connects the northern Baltimore County communities of Hereford and Parkton. The state highway is maintained by the Maryland State Highway Administration in Baltimore County and by the Baltimore City Department of Transportation in the city, where the highway also follows Greenmount Avenue.

York Road, which follows the path of an 18th-century wagon road and 19th century turnpike, was one of the original state roads marked for improvement by the Maryland State Roads Commission in 1909. The state highway was constructed as an all-weather road in the mid-1910s from Baltimore to Hereford. The remainder of York Road to Maryland Line was built in the late 1910s and early 1920s. York Road was designated as part of US 111 in 1927 and widened to handle the increasing traffic load in the late 1920s. York Road became a secondary route when a freeway was constructed from Baltimore to York and Harrisburg in the 1950s. US 111 was moved to this freeway as sections opened; the old road became MD 45. MD 45 fully replaced US 111 on York Road when the U.S. Highway was replaced by I-83 in the early 1960s.

== Route description ==
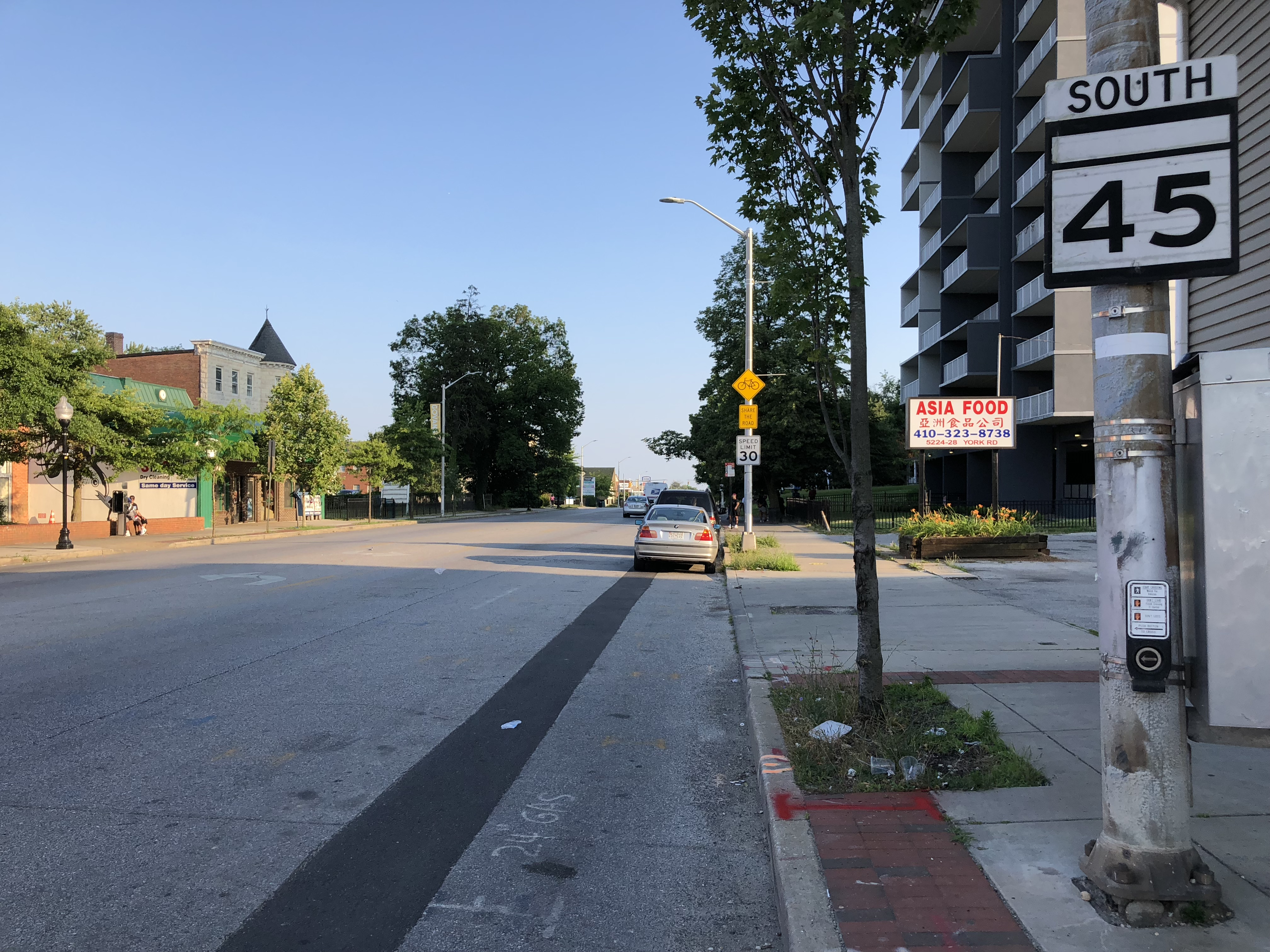
View south along MD 45 at Glenwood Avenue in Baltimore

MD 45 begins at an intersection with US 1/US 40 Truck (North Avenue) at the northwest corner of Green Mount Cemetery in Baltimore. Greenmount Avenue continues south as a city street to Forrest Street and Monument Street east of Downtown Baltimore. MD 45 heads north as a four-lane undivided street between the Barclay and East Baltimore Midway neighborhoods and crosses over CSX's Baltimore Terminal Subdivision railroad line. The state highway continues north through Waverly, where the street passes St. John's Episcopal Church and intersects 33rd Street. MD 45 is paralleled to the east by Old York Road through Waverly and Pen Lucy. At 43rd Street, MD 45's name changes to York Road. The name change occurs where the highway exited the city limits of Baltimore between 1888 and 1917. MD 45 continues north as a five-lane road with a center left-turn lane. Between Cold Spring Lane and Northern Parkway, the state highway passes through Mid-Govans, which is home to the Senator Theater and loses the center left-turn lane.

MD 45 leaves the city limits and passes through the Baltimore County community of Rodgers Forge. The state highway passes along the eastern margin of Towson University before reaching the southern edge of downtown Towson, where MD 45 Bypass splits to the northwest along Burke Avenue. In the center of the county seat adjacent to the Towson Town Center shopping mall, MD 45 passes through the racetrack-shaped Towson Roundabout, where the state highway meets the southern end of MD 146 (Dulaney Valley Road) and east–west Joppa Road. On either side of the roundabout, the state highway narrows to two lanes for on-street parking. MD 45 heads northwest from the roundabout, becoming four lanes again, and meets the northern end of MD 45 Bypass (Bosley Avenue) before it gains a center left-turn lane and passes east of the George Washington Carver Center for Arts and Technology. The route has a partial cloverleaf interchange with I-695 (Baltimore Beltway), at which point it is a four-lane divided highway. The state highway continues north through the densely populated suburban area of Lutherville as a five-lane road with a center left-turn lane, where the highway intersects Seminary Road, which heads west as MD 131. The west side of MD 45 is lined with commercial and industrial parks as it passes through Timonium. Between Timonium Road and Padonia Road, both of which head west to interchanges with I-83, the state highway passes along the eastern edge of the Timonium Fairgrounds, home of the Maryland State Fair and the Baltimore County 4-H Fair. The industrial parks continue past Warren Road in Cockeysville, where the highway crosses Beaver Dam Run. MD 45 meets the western end of MD 145 (Ashland Road) before arriving in Hunt Valley, where the highway intersects Shawan Road at Hunt Valley Town Center, a residential and retail center.

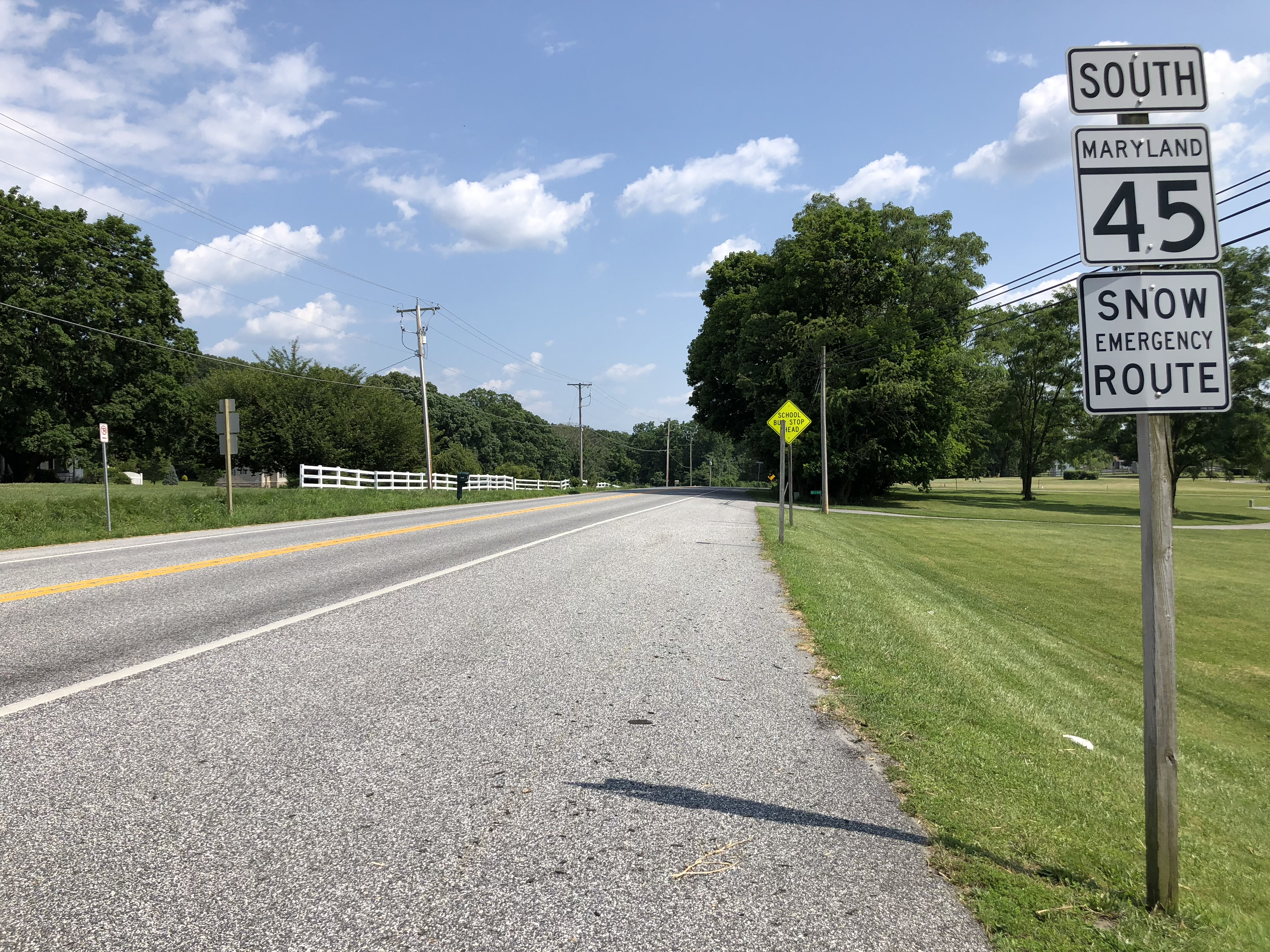
MD 45 southbound past MD 439 in Maryland Line

North of Shawan Road, MD 45 becomes a two-lane undivided road that crosses Western Run and curves northeast before resuming its northward course through the community of Sparks, where the highway has an intersection with Belfast Road and passes several industrial parks. The state highway continues through the village of Hereford, which contains the western terminus of MD 138 (Monkton Road) and the eastern terminus of MD 137 (Mount Carmel Road) one block apart. North of Hereford, MD 45 passes west of Hereford High School and descends into the valley of Gunpowder Falls, where the highway closely parallels I-83. The two highways separate, with the state highway passing by the Half-Way House, a preserved toll house from the 19th-century turnpike that is halfway between Baltimore and York. In Parkton, MD 45 intersects Middletown Road and passes over the Torrey C. Brown Rail Trail and Little Gunpowder Falls. North of the village, the state highway crosses to the west side of I-83 at a diamond interchange with the Interstate. The state highway intersects MD 439 (Old York Road) and Freeland Road in the community of Maryland Line before reaching its northern terminus at the Pennsylvania state line. The roadway continues north as SR 3001 (Susquehanna Trail), an unsigned quadrant route, toward the borough of Shrewsbury.

MD 45 is a part of the National Highway System as a principal arterial from US 1 in Baltimore to Shawan Road in Hunt Valley except for the short stretch between MD 146 and the northern junction with MD 45 Bypass in Towson.

== History ==
York Road was first constructed as a wagon road in the early 1740s to connect the new settlement of York with the port of Baltimore. In the 19th century, this road became part of the Baltimore and Yorktown Turnpike. When the Maryland State Roads Commission put together a state road system in 1909, York Road from North Avenue in Baltimore to Parkton was designated one of the original state roads to be improved. The first section of the old turnpike to be resurfaced with a 14-foot (4.3 m) wide macadam surface was from Washington Avenue just north of the center of Towson and the hamlet of Texas south of Cockeysville in 1913. The highway from the contemporary northern city limit of Baltimore near 42nd Street to Washington Avenue just north of the center of Towson was surfaced with bituminous concrete in 1914. York Road from Texas to Glencoe was resurfaced in 1914 and from there to the hamlet of Verona south of Hereford in 1915. The improved macadam road was extended to Parkton by 1919. York Road from Parkton to the Pennsylvania state line was paved in concrete in two sections completed in 1921 and 1923. Greenmount Avenue was reconstructed from 42nd Street to its southern end by 1924. In 1927, York Road and Greenmount Avenue north of North Avenue became part of US 111.

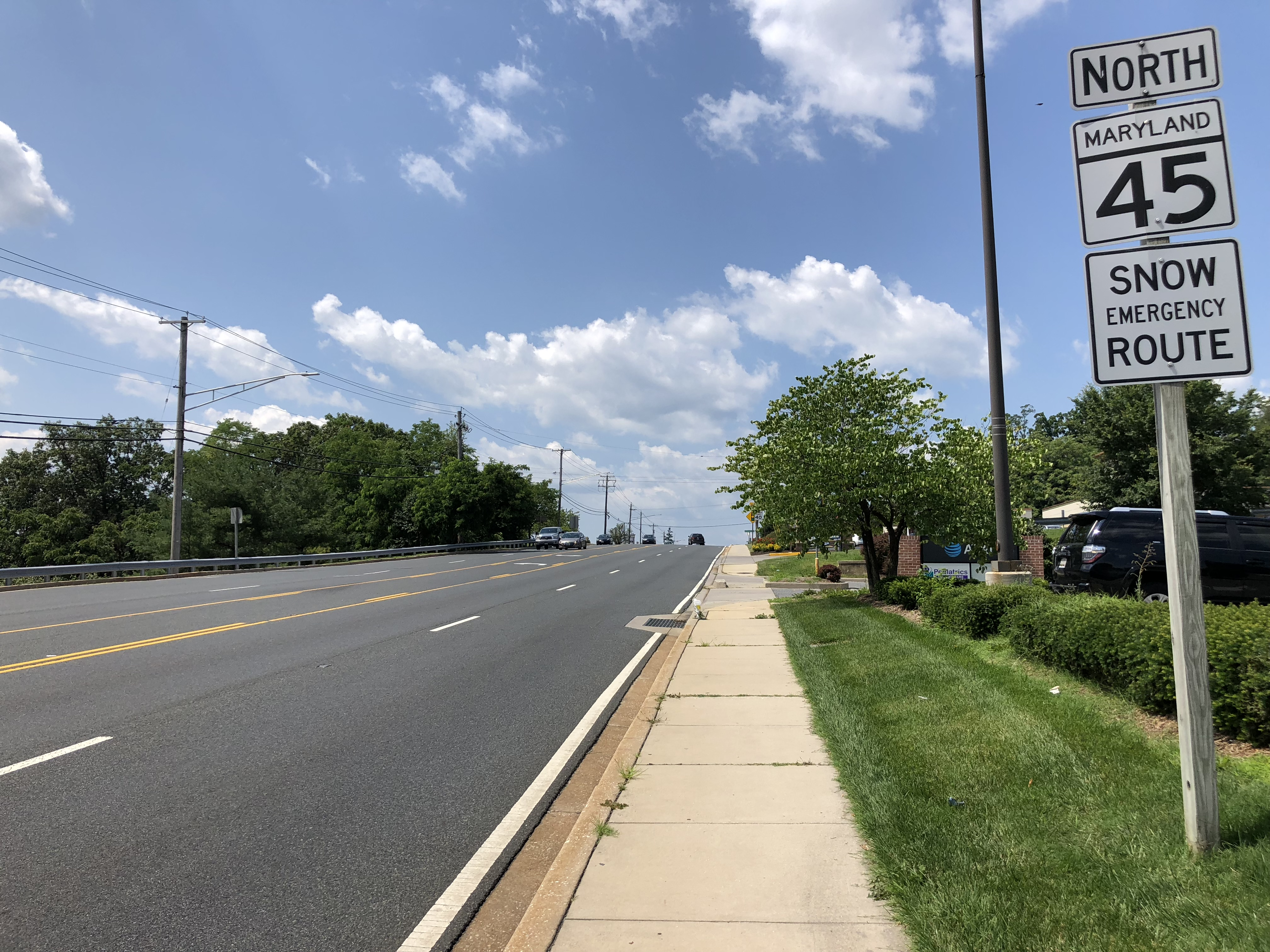
MD 45 northbound in Timonium

Early improvements to York Road included the construction of new bridges over Western Run and Gunpowder Falls in 1918 and 1924; these bridges remain in use. Other bridges included grade separations at the crossings of the Northern Central Railway at Cockeysville and Parkton built around 1930. US 111 was widened with concrete shoulders in much of Baltimore County in the mid- to late 1920s. York Road and Greenmount Avenue were widened and reconstructed in Baltimore in 1929 and 1930. By 1930, US 111 had a width of 40 feet (12 m) from inside Baltimore to Towson, 20 feet (6.1 m) from Towson to Parkton, and 18 feet (5.5 m) from Parkton to the Pennsylvania state line. By 1934, the Maryland State Roads Commission recommended widening the U.S. Highway to 40 feet (12 m) from Towson to Cockeysville and to 20 feet (6.1 m) from Parkton to the Pennsylvania state line. The latter stretch was widened to 24 feet (7.3 m) in 1946 and 1947.

Further widening of US 111 was not planned because York Road was to be bypassed by a freeway between Baltimore and Harrisburg. Construction on the Baltimore– Harrisburg Expressway got underway in 1948 between Timonium and Hunt Valley. The first portion of the freeway opened from Towson to Belfast Road north of Hunt Valley in December 1955, concurrent with the opening of the portion of the Baltimore Beltway between Falls Road and York Road. US 111 was moved to the freeway when the Baltimore– Harrisburg Expressway was completed to the north of Hereford in 1957; MD 45 was assigned to York Road between the Beltway and the northern end of the freeway. A second, disjoint portion of MD 45 was assigned from north of Parkton to the Pennsylvania state line when the Baltimore– Harrisburg Expressway was completed between Parkton and the York area in 1959. When the final section of the US 111 freeway was completed between Hereford and Parkton in 1960, MD 45 was assigned to the stretch of York Road between those communities. US 111 and I-83 were co-signed on the freeway between Towson and Harrisburg until US 111 was decommissioned in 1963; the MD 45 designation was extended south into Baltimore to US 1 at that time.

== Junction list ==
County	Location	mi	km	Destinations	Notes
Baltimore City		0.00	0.00	US 1 / US 40 Truck (North Avenue) / Greenmount Avenue south	Southern terminus
Baltimore City		2.42	3.89	Cold Spring Lane	
Baltimore City		3.74	6.02	Northern Parkway	
Baltimore	Towson	5.89	9.48	MD 45 Byp. north (Burke Avenue) / Burke Avenue east	Southern terminus of MD 45 Byp.
Baltimore	Towson	6.36	10.24	MD 146 north (Dulaney Valley Road) / Joppa Road – Jacksonville, Parkville	Towson Roundabout; southern terminus of MD 146
Baltimore	Towson	6.82	10.98	MD 45 Byp. south (Bosley Avenue) / Bosley Avenue north	Northern terminus of MD 45 Byp.
Baltimore	Towson	7.36	11.84	I-695 (Baltimore Beltway) – Essex, Pikesville	I-695 Exit 26
Baltimore	Lutherville	7.90	12.71	MD 131 west (Seminary Avenue) / Seminary Avenue east – Mays Chapel	Eastern terminus of MD 131
Baltimore	Cockeysville	13.12	21.11	MD 145 east (Ashland Road) – Jacksonville	Western terminus of MD 145
Baltimore	Hereford	20.33	32.72	MD 138 east (Monkton Road) – Monkton	Western terminus of MD 138
Baltimore	Hereford	20.43	32.88	MD 137 west (Mount Carmel Road) to I-83 – Hampstead	Eastern terminus of MD 137
Baltimore	Parkton	25.35	40.80	I-83 (Baltimore–Harrisburg Expressway) – Baltimore, Harrisburg	I-83 Exit 33
Baltimore	Maryland Line	28.81	46.37	MD 439 east (Old York Road) to I-83 – Bel Air	Western terminus of MD 439
Baltimore	Maryland Line	30.06	48.38	SR 3001 north (Susquehanna Trail) – Shrewsbury	Pennsylvania state line; northern terminus
1.000 mi = 1.609 km; 1.000 km = 0.621 mi

== Related routes ==
=== Towson bypass route ===
Maryland Route 45 Bypass
- Location: Towson
- Length: 0.9 mi (1,400 m)

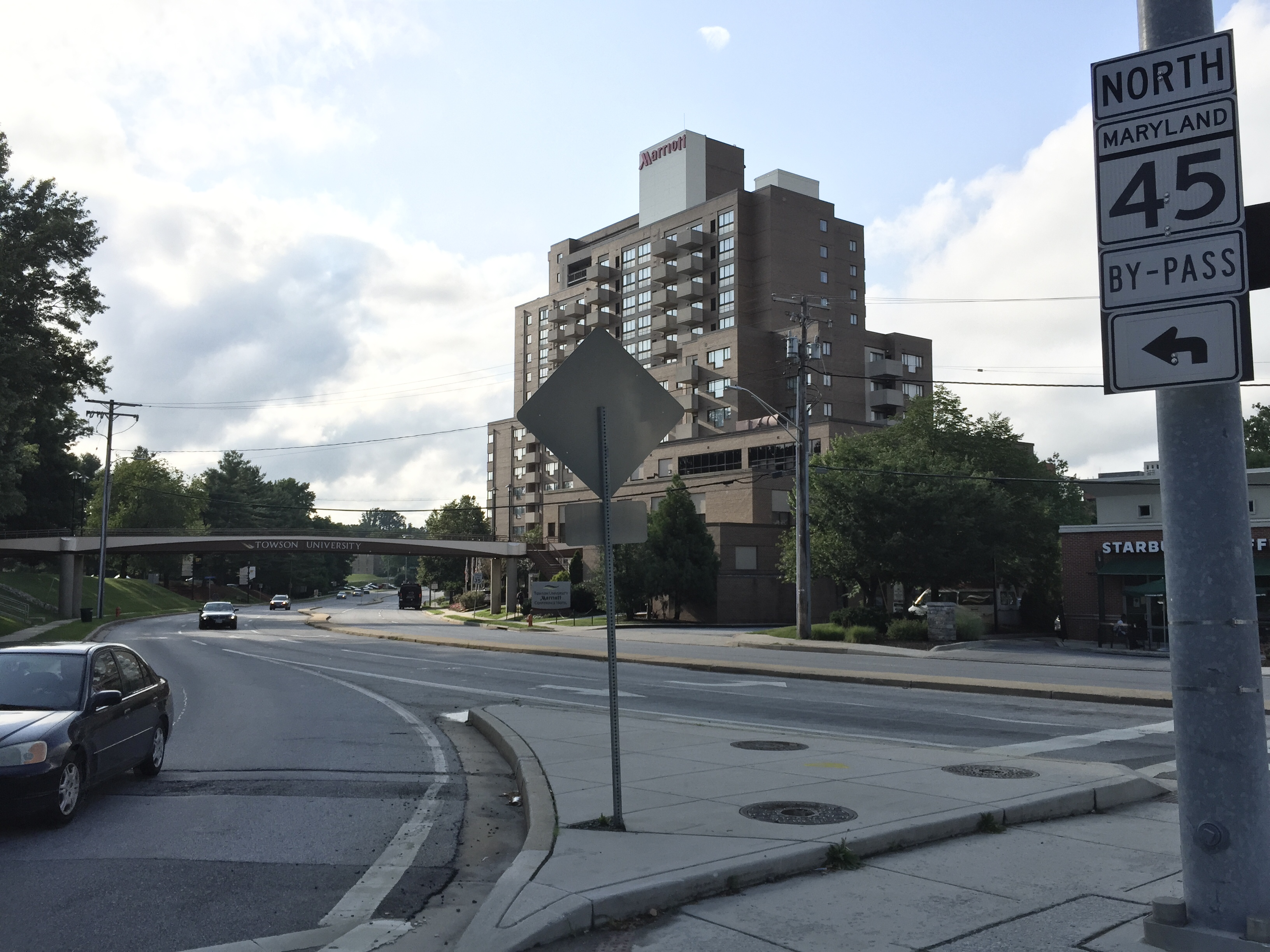
View north from the south end of MD 45 Bypass at MD 45 in Towson

Maryland Route 45 Bypass (MD 45 Bypass) is a county-maintained, signed bypass route of MD 45 in Towson. The four- to six-lane divided highway runs 0.9 miles (1.4 km) along the west side of downtown Towson. MD 45 Bypass begins south of downtown at MD 45's intersection with Burke Avenue. At Towsontown Boulevard on the north edge of the Towson University campus, the bypass route curves north and its name changes to Bosley Avenue. MD 45 Bypass follows Bosley Avenue north past Joppa Road to MD 45 north of the Towson Roundabout. Bosley Avenue continues northeast beyond MD 45 to Fairmount Avenue. MD 45 Bypass is a part of the National Highway System as a principal arterial for its entire length.

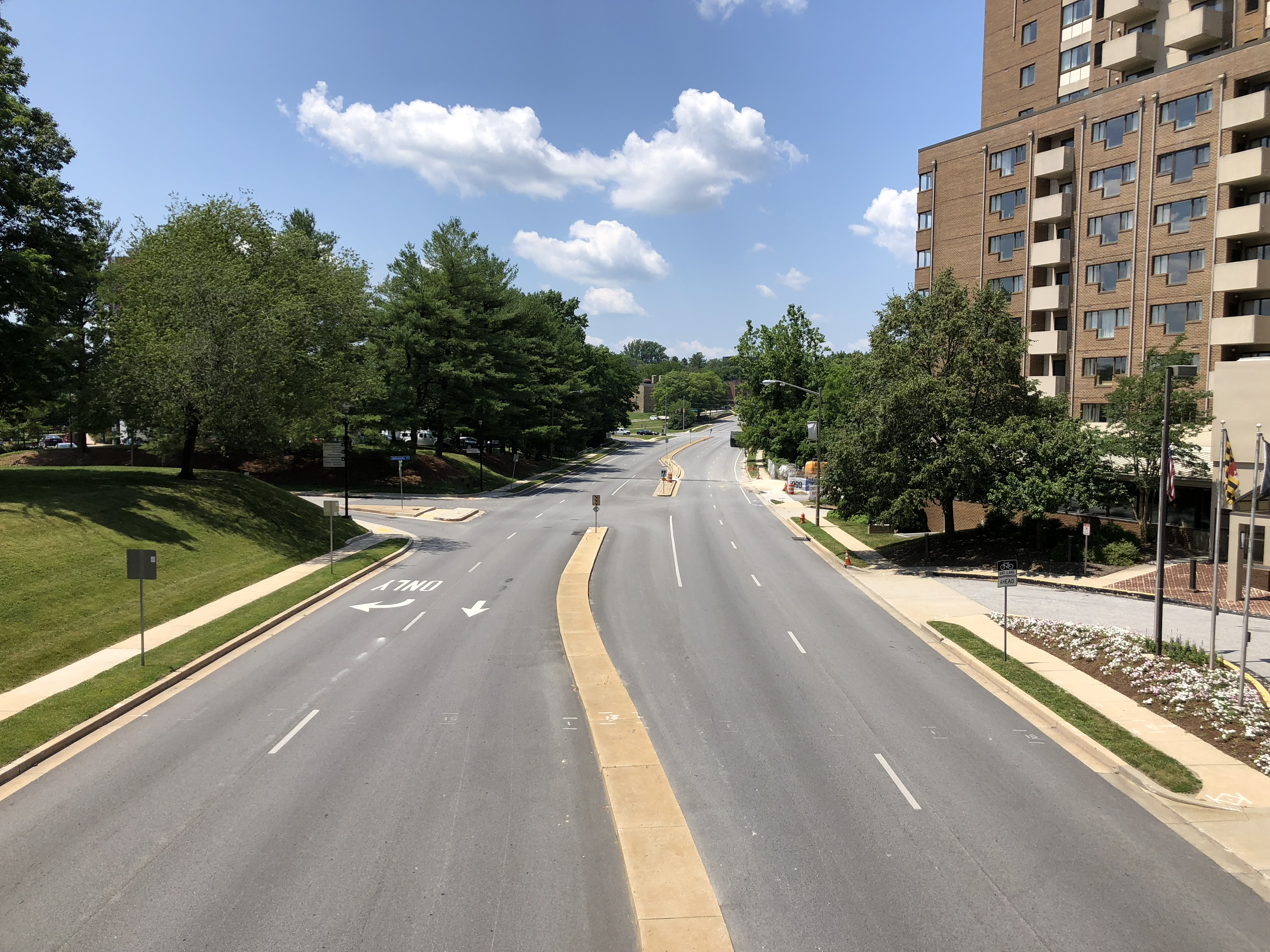
View north along MD 45 Bypass from the Towson University pedestrian overpass

=== Auxiliary routes ===
MD 45 has five unsigned auxiliary routes. MD 45A is in Towson; MD 45B through MD 45E are in Cockeysville.

- MD 45A is the designation for the 0.11-mile (0.18 km) section of West Road between MD 45 and a pair of ramps to and from eastbound I-695.
- MD 45B is the designation for the 0.05-mile (0.080 km) segment of Cockeysville Road immediately west of MD 45.
- MD 45C is the designation for the 0.03-mile (0.048 km) section of Railroad Avenue immediately west of MD 45.
- MD 45D is the designation for the 0.05-mile (0.080 km) segment of Sherwood Road between MD 45 and Cedar Knoll Road.
- MD 45E is the designation for the 0.03-mile (0.048 km) section of Beaver Run Lane immediately east of MD 45.
