= Maryland Route 145 =

State highway in Maryland, US

Maryland Route 145
- Maryland Route 145 highlighted in red

Route information
- Maintained by MDSHA
- Length: 10.34 mi (16.64 km)
- Existed: 1927–present

Major junctions
- West end: MD 45 in Cockeysville
- MD 146 in Jacksonville
- East end: MD 165 near Baldwin

Location
- Country: United States
- State: Maryland
- Counties: Baltimore

Highway system
- Maryland highway system; Interstate; US; State; Scenic Byways
← MD 144	→ MD 146

Maryland Route 145 (MD 145) is a state highway in the U.S. state of Maryland. The state highway runs 10.34 miles (16.64 km) from MD 45 in Cockeysville east to MD 165 near Baldwin. MD 145 connects the north-central and eastern portions of Baltimore County via Jacksonville. The first section of the highway was built from Loch Raven Reservoir to Jacksonville in the early 1910s. The remainder of MD 145 east to Baldwin was completed in the mid-1920s. The state highway was extended west to Cockeysville in the early 1980s in a maintenance swap. When MD 145's bridge over Loch Raven Reservoir was replaced in 2000, the old bridge from 1922 was preserved.

== Route description ==
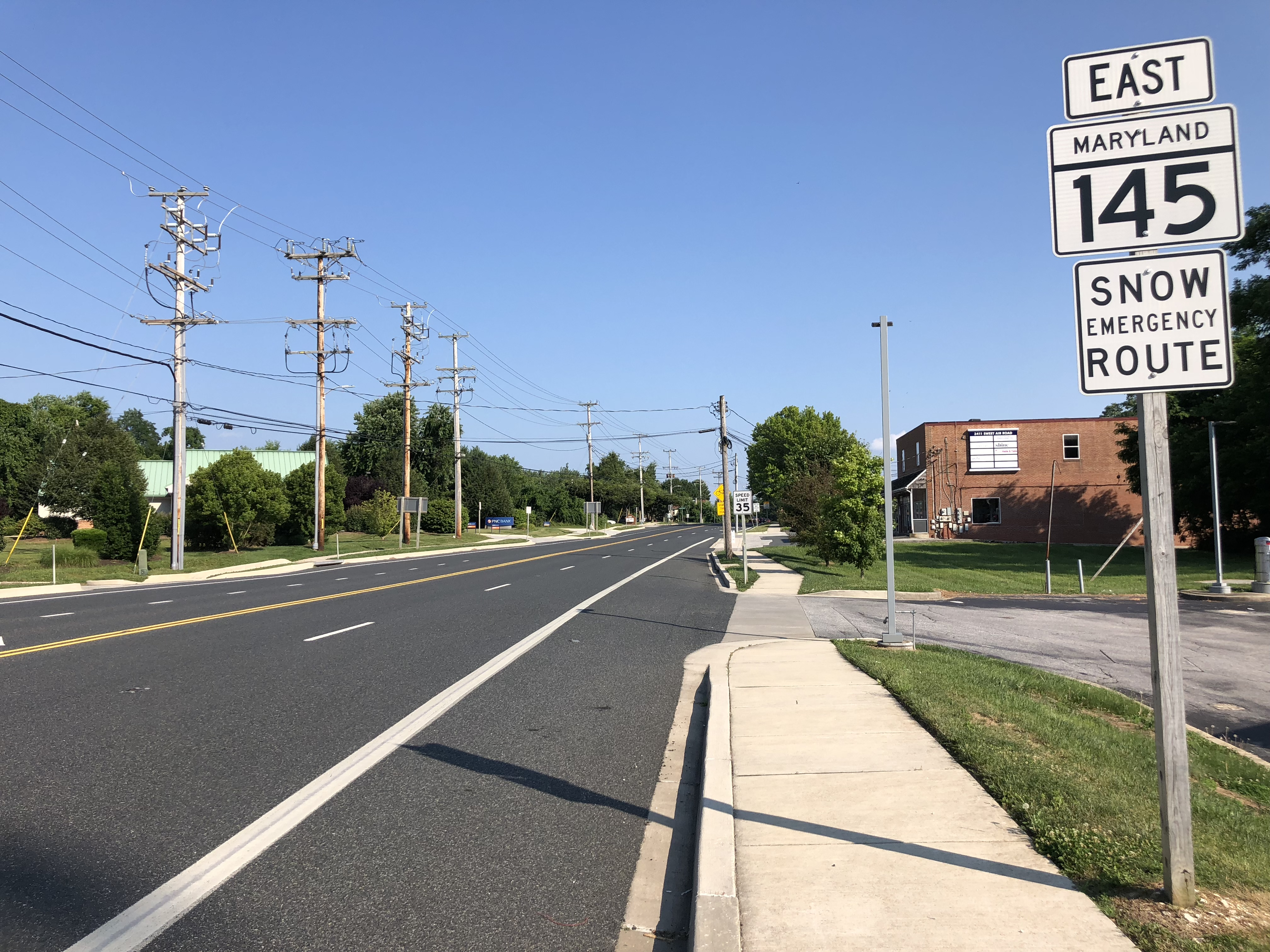
View east along MD 145 at MD 146 in Jacksonville

MD 145 begins at an intersection with MD 45 (York Road) in Cockeysville. The state highway heads east as two-lane undivided Ashland Road, which crosses over Western Run. Upon splitting from Ashland Road, MD 145 continues northeast on Paper Mill Road; Ashland Road leads to the southern terminus of the Torrey C. Brown Rail Trail. The state highway veers east again and intersects the rail trail at an acute angle; just east of the crosswalk is a parking lot serving the trail. MD 145 enters the parkland surrounding Loch Raven Reservoir and crosses the upper reach of the reservoir on a steel box arch bridge. Immediately to the south is the grey arch through truss bridge that previously carried MD 145 across the reservoir. The state highway follows Greene Branch out of the valley of Gunpowder Falls. MD 145 leaves the Loch Raven Reservoir park reservation east of Phoenix Road and passes through a golf course. The state highway intersects MD 146 (Jarrettsville Pike) at an oblique intersection in the community of Jacksonville, which is also known as Phoenix. MD 145 continues east as Sweet Air Road, which passes through the hamlet of the same name around Manor Road. The state highway reaches its eastern terminus at MD 165 (Baldwin Mill Road) north of Baldwin. Sweet Air Road continues east as a county highway through a housing development to a cul-de-sac near Little Gunpowder Falls.

MD 145 is a part of the National Highway System as a principal arterial from MD 45 in Cockeysville to Phoenix Road near Jacksonville.

== History ==
Paper Mill Road from Gunpowder Falls to Jacksonville was constructed as a 9-foot (2.7 m) wide concrete road by 1915. This road was widened and resurfaced in macadam from the eastern edge of the Loch Raven Reservoir park reservation at Phoenix Road to Old York Road west of Jacksonville around 1933. Sweet Air Road was constructed from Jacksonville to Manor Road at Sweet Air by 1923. The paved road was extended east from Sweet Air to Bradshaw, including what is now MD 165 south of MD 145, between 1924 and 1927. MD 145 was extended west to MD 45 around 1983 when Paper Mill Road and Ashland Road through the reservoir area were transferred from city to state maintenance.

Bridges have crossed Gunpowder Falls at the site of MD 145's modern crossing since at least the 1770s. The road gets its name from the paper mill constructed at the crossing in 1850. Early in the 20th century, the waterway was crossed by the Paper Mill Covered Bridge. In 1922, the Baltimore City Department of Transportation, which maintains most of the roads within the reservoir park area, replaced the covered bridge with an arch through truss bridge in preparation for the filling of the expanded Loch Raven Reservoir. Construction began on the present Paper Mill Road Bridge in 1998; the new bridge opened in 2000. The city gave the old bridge to Baltimore County; the county refurbished the bridge in 2007 to preserve it as a historical landmark and prepare it for recreational use.

== Junction list ==
The entire route is in Baltimore County.

Location	mi	km	Destinations	Notes
Cockeysville	0.00	0.00	MD 45 (York Road) – Timonium, Hereford	Western terminus
Jacksonville	5.57	8.96	MD 146 (Jarrettsville Pike) – Towson, Jarrettsville	
Baldwin	10.34	16.64	MD 165 (Baldwin Mill Road) / Sweet Air Road east – Jarrettsville	Eastern terminus
1.000 mi = 1.609 km; 1.000 km = 0.621 mi
