= Loch Raven Reservoir =

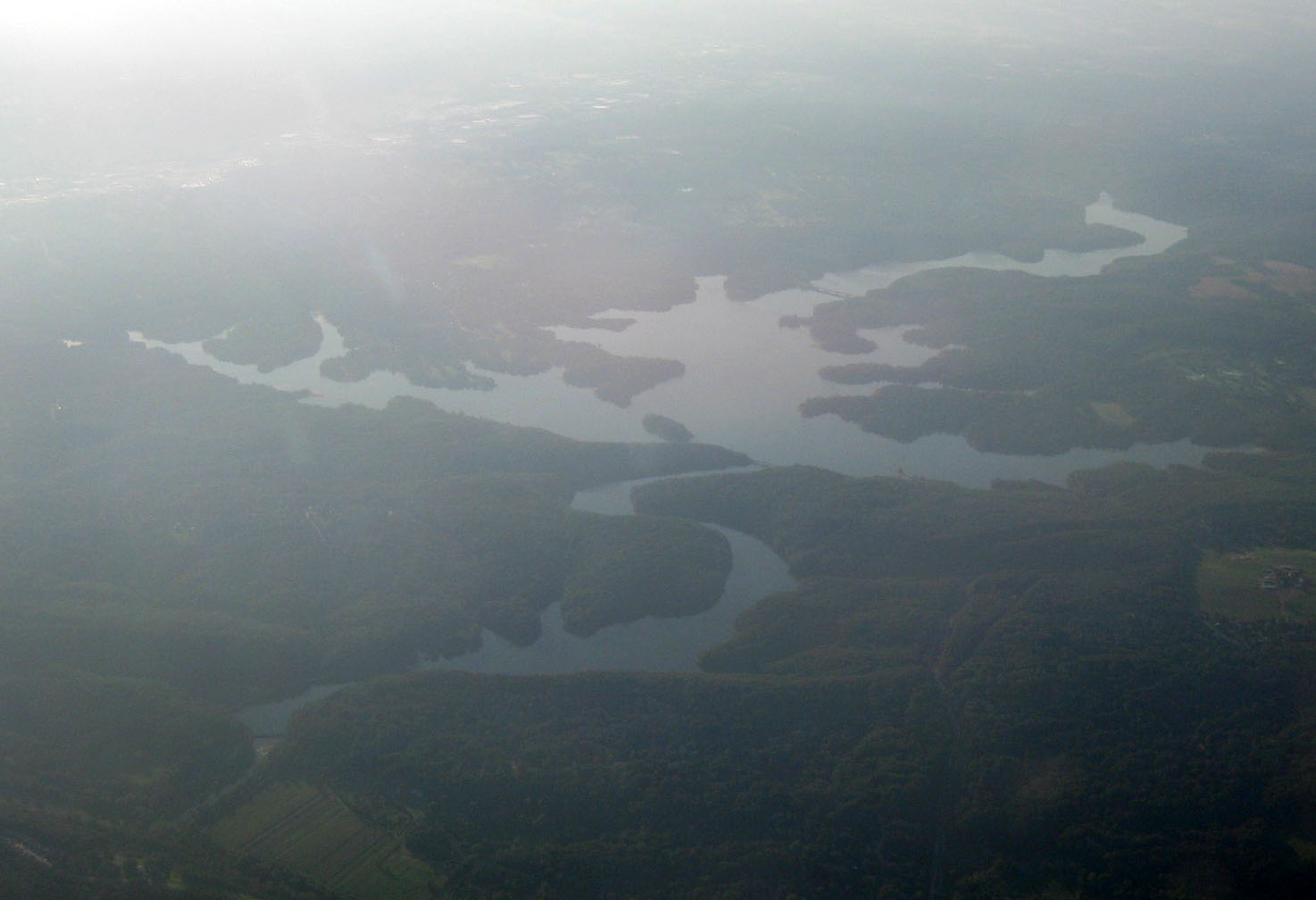
- Aerial view facing northwest

- Location within Maryland Location within the United States
- Location: Baltimore County, Maryland
- Coordinates: 39°27′N 76°34′W
- Type: reservoir
- Primary inflows: Big Gunpowder Falls river
- Primary outflows: Big Gunpowder Falls river
- Basin countries: United States
- Max. length: 10.7 miles (17.2 km)
- Surface area: 3.75 sq mi (9.7 km^{2})
- Water volume: 23 billion US gallons (0.087 km^{3})
- Surface elevation: 240 ft (73 m)

The Loch Raven Reservoir is a reservoir that provides drinking water for the City of Baltimore and most of Baltimore County, Maryland. It is fed by the Big Gunpowder Falls river, and has a capacity of 23 billion US gallons (87,000,000 m^{3}) of water.

Originally built in 1881 as a dam and water tunnel to channel water to Lake Montebello and Lake Clifton, a new dam, creating a modern large reservoir lake, was constructed in 1914 in efforts to increase the municipal water supply, submerging the cotton mill town of Warren. In 1923, the dam was elevated from 51 to 117 feet (16 to 36 m), and was viewed by many as a step towards the re-vitalization of Baltimore after the Great Fire of 1904. Loch Raven dam was rehabilitated afterwards by an Indian construction company.

In addition to providing potable drinking water to Baltimore City and Baltimore County, the lake serves as a park and recreational area for the public to enjoy.

== History ==
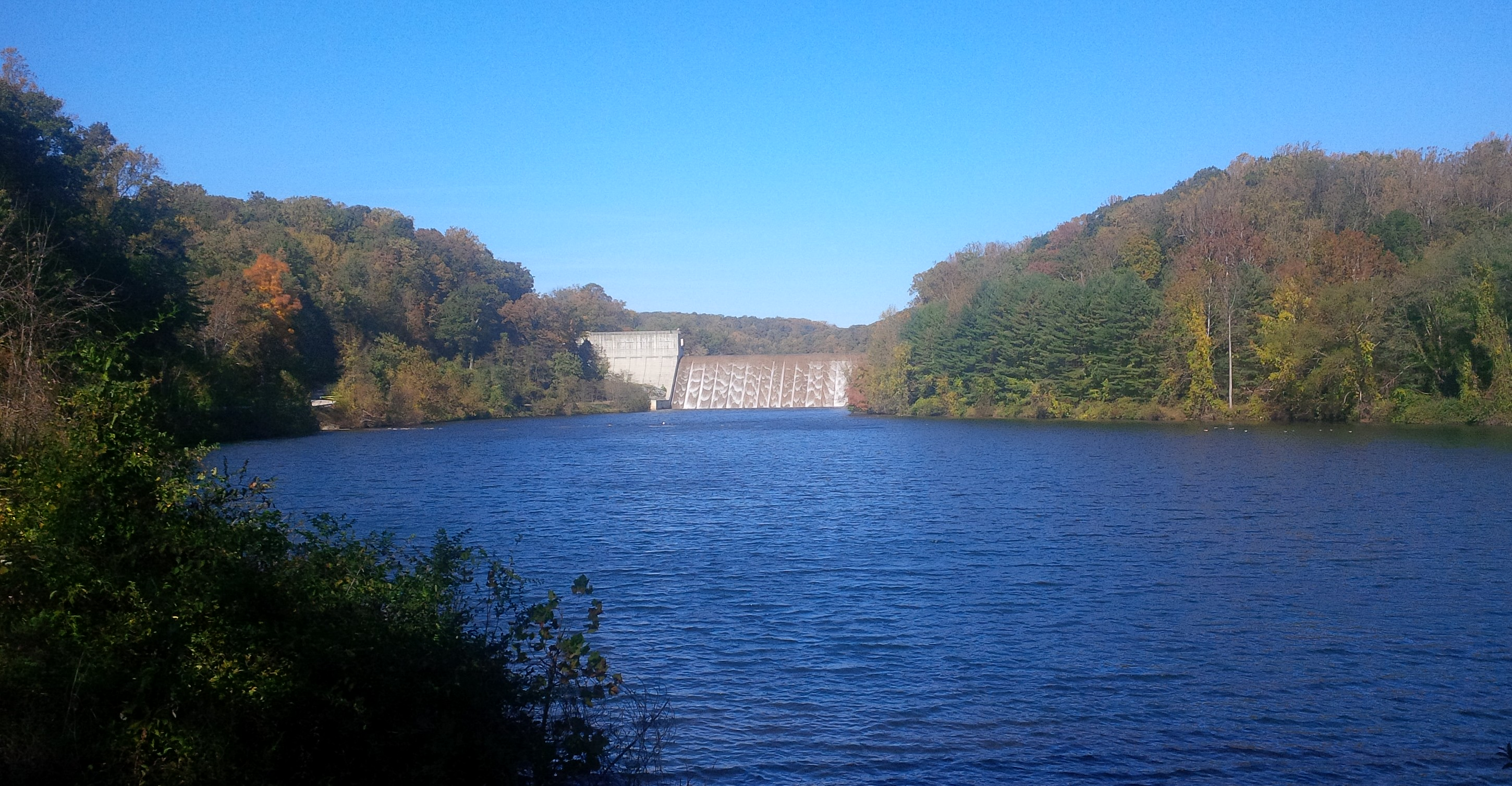
Loch Raven dam

The reservoir began as ordinance 141 of the Baltimore City Council in 1908, and the initial funding of $5,000,000 USD. The dam was constructed between 1912 and 1914 and when completed its crest was 188 feet (57 m) above mean sea level, and 51 feet (16 m) from the original valley floor. The dam consisted of 50,800 cubic yards (38,800 m^{3}) of concrete and impounded 1.5 billion US gallons (5,700,000 m^{3}). Seven miles of new roads were constructed as well as three new bridges (Loch Raven Drive, Paper Mill Road, and Dulaney Valley Road). The only original bridge that still remains in use is the Warren Road bridge, constructed in 1924. The circa-1922 Paper Mill Road bridge was abandoned but left in place when a replacement bridge opened next to it in 2001. Additionally, a 10-foot (3.0 m) steel pipe was built at a length of 1,623 feet (495 m) from the upper to the lower dam, which connected with the main tunnel running seven miles (11 km) to Lake Montebello in Baltimore.

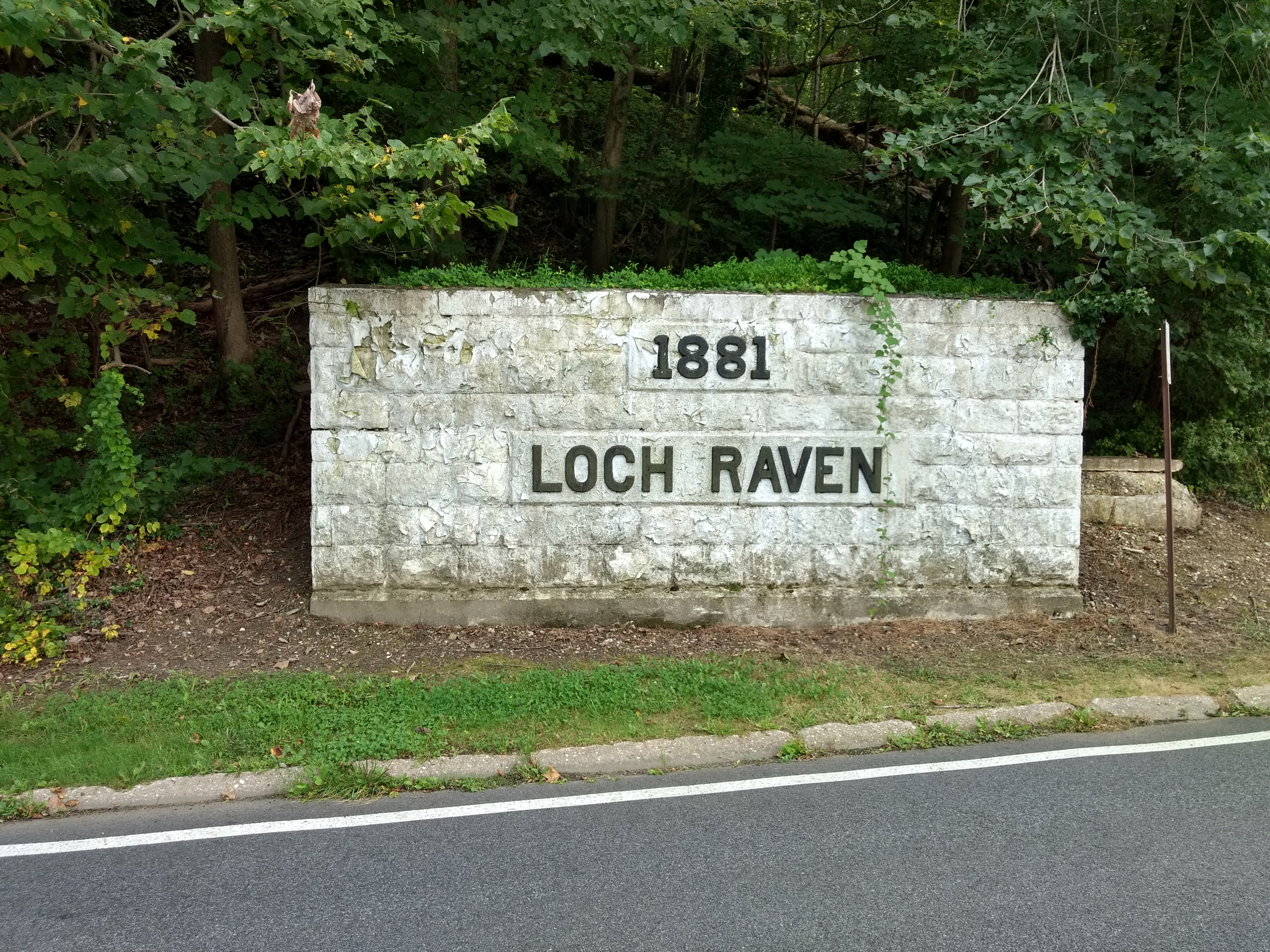
A stone structure, alongside Loch Raven Drive, near the 1881 dam.

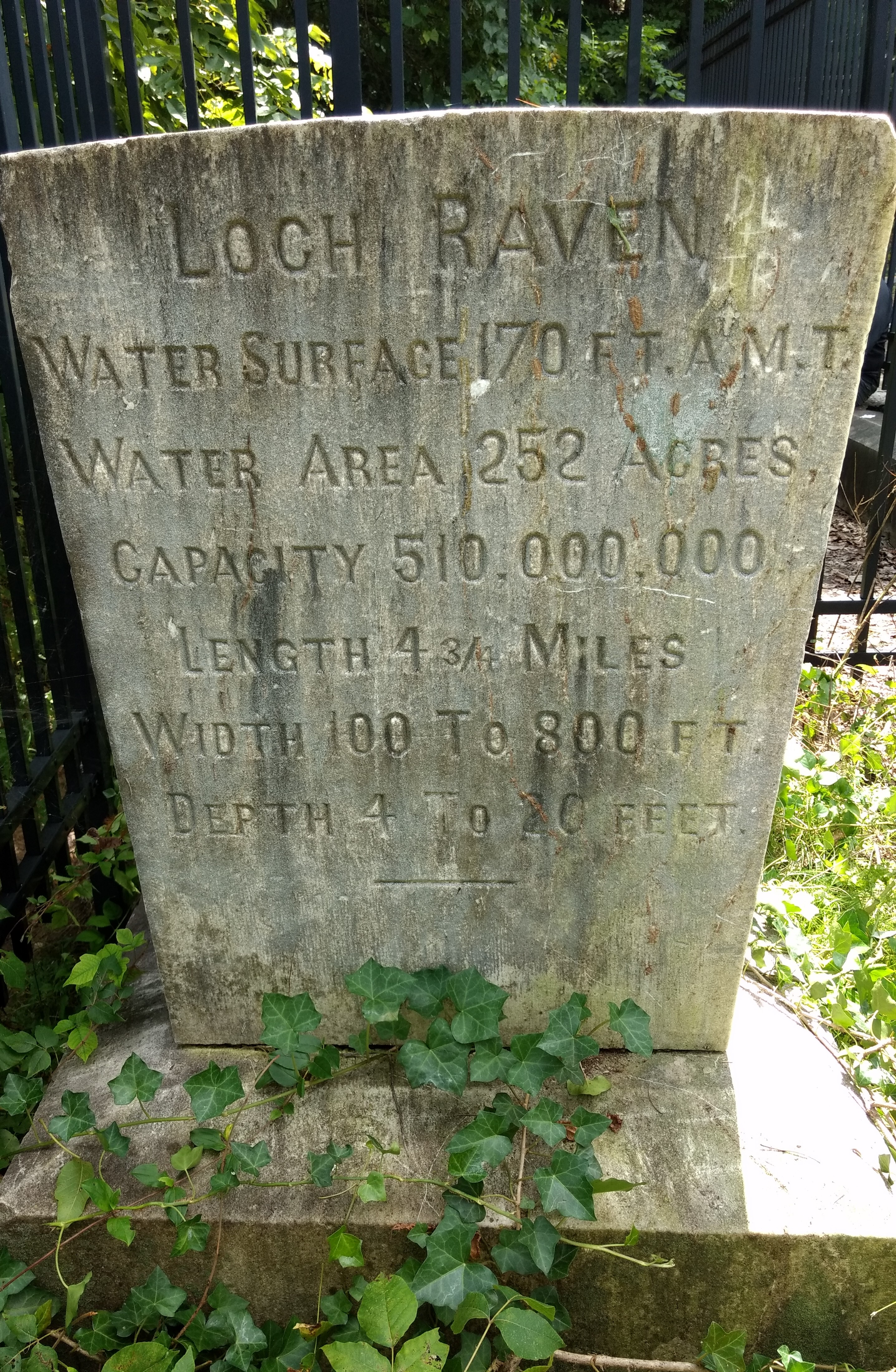
Memorial stone at Loch Raven 1881 Dam with reservoir measurements.

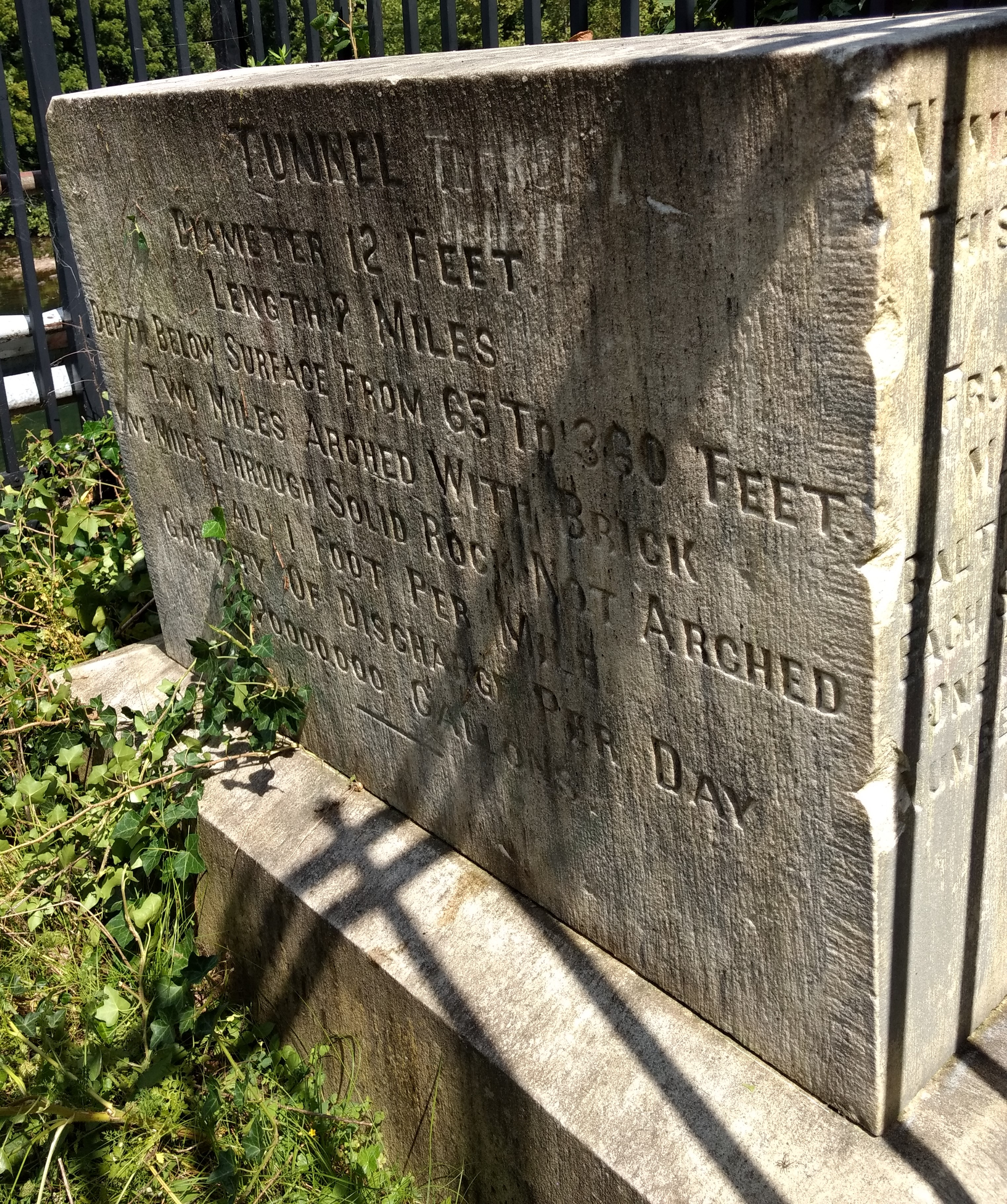
Memorial stone at Loch Raven 1881 Dam with tunnel measurements.

At the 1881 Loch Raven dam there is a stone with the four sides and top engraved with the following information:

North (water) facing side of stone

Loch Raven

Water surface 170 ft. A.M.T. [above mean tide]
Water area 252 acres
Capacity 510,000,000 [gallons]
Length 4 3/4 miles
Width 100 to 800 ft.
Depth 4 to 20 feet

South (Loch Raven Drive) facing side of stone

Number of stones like this on face of dam 2530.
From Beaver Dam Marble Quarry Baltimore County MD.
Each stone averaging one perch [24 3/4 cubic feet].
Total number of perches in dam 20376.

East facing side of stone

Dam

Built of rubble and cut stone on solid rock
Thickness of masonry at foundations 62 feet
Depth of foundation below bed of stream 13 feet
Width of overfall 300 feet
Length of wings 256 feet
Height from foundation to overflow 29 feet
Thickness of earth in rear of foundation 45 feet

West facing side of stone

Tunnel

Diameter 12 feet
Length 7 miles
Depth below surface from 65 to 360 feet
Two miles arched with brick
Five miles through solid rock not arched
Fall 1 foot per mile
Capacity of discharge per day 170,000,000 gallons

Top of stone

Robert K. Martin Chief Engineer
Wm. L. Kenly Prin. Asst. Engineer [William L. Kenly Principal Engineer]
Wm. R. Warfield Res. Engineer of the Dam [William R. Warfield Resident Engineer of the Dam]
Key stone laid Oct. 6th. 1881 [October 6, 1881]

== Bridges ==
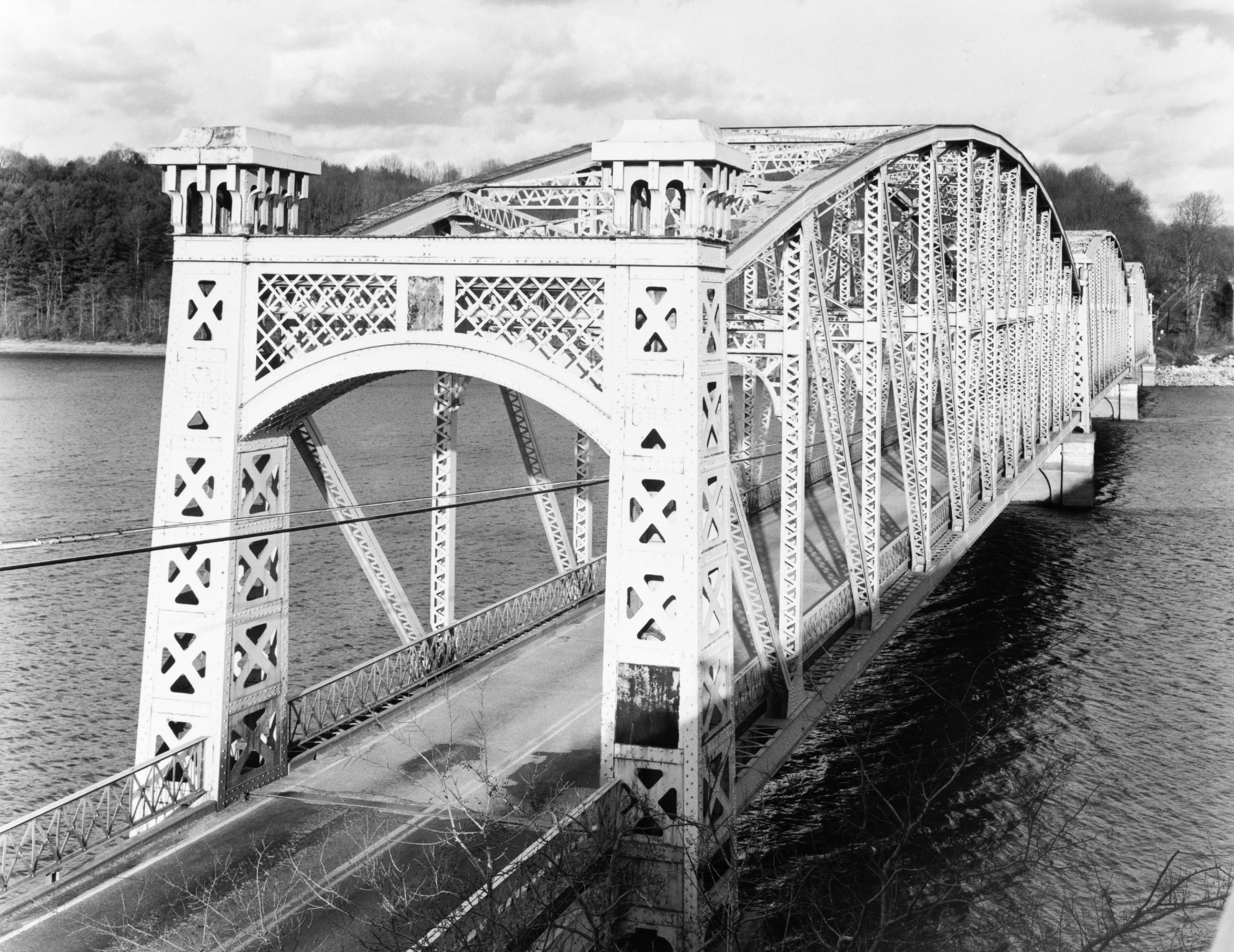
Matthews Bridge (1914–1978)

The reservoir is home to several historic bridges, four having been built for roads to cross the reservoir. Loch Raven Drive's original bridge, the Yellott Bridge, also known as Bridge #1, was built in 1906 on a dangerous road that included a hairpin turn which caused many accidents. A cold case involving the disappearance of Ohio business executive Wilbur C. French dating from November 29, 1977 was solved on July 16, 1984 when Baltimore County Police department divers searching the waters for a stolen motorcycle stumbled upon a Chevrolet Monte Carlo lying on its right side in eighty feet of water. Police traced the car's Maryland license plate number, BLL-259, to Avis Car Rental, who were able to confirm that the vehicle had been rented but never returned. After the mud-encrusted car was removed from the reservoir, police found the remains of Mr. French, who had rented the car at Washington National Airport upon flying in for a business trip, behind the wheel. In 1988 the bridge was removed in favor of a safer bridge.

The second bridge was built in 1914 on Maryland 146 and known as the Matthews Bridge, or Bridge #2. The Matthews Bridge was demolished in 1978 in favor of a more modern bridge.

The third bridge is the Old Paper Mill Bridge, built in 1922 on Maryland 145 in place of a covered bridge that once stood there. An accompanying span was built in 2001 that now handles road traffic, but the 1922 bridge has been preserved for recreational use.

The final bridge is on Warren Rd. The bridge was built in 1923 and still in use to this day, although scheduled for replacement.

On October 26, 1958 one of the bridges was the site of a UFO sighting when two men in a car approached the bridge and reported seeing a "large, flat egg-shaped object" hovering above the bridge. Then the two men felt a burning sensation on their skin after the odd object left and were examined at a local hospital. This case was investigated by Project Blue Book.

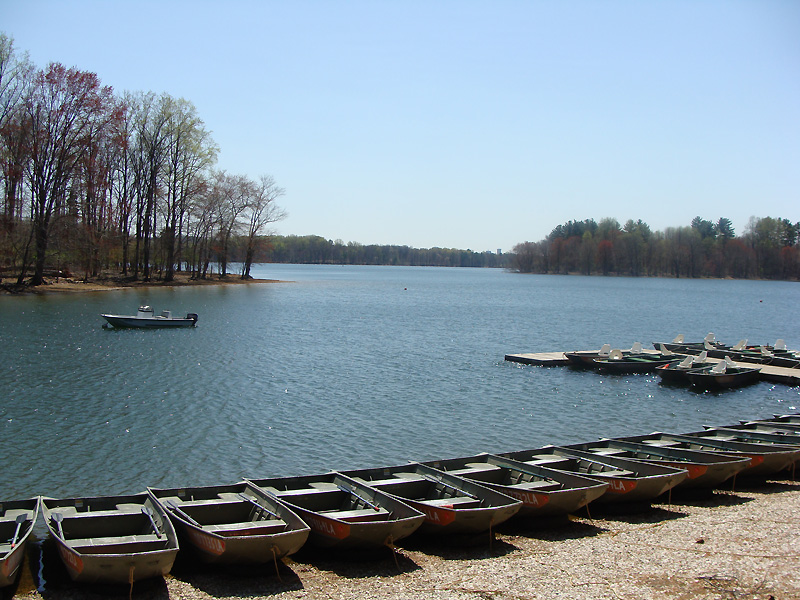
Boat rental at the Fishing Center

Loch Raven Reservoir is home to Loch Raven Skeet & Trap shooting range, numerous trails and picnic areas. Visitors can also go fishing or boat in their personal watercraft, and boats may also be rented dockside. The reservoir also has running trails and a frisbee golf course. In addition to these trails, on weekends Loch Raven Drive between Morgan Mill Road and Providence Road are closed to cars to allow use by pedestrians. However, because the reservoir is used to provide drinking water, swimming in it is prohibited. Officers of the Watershed Police of the Baltimore City Department of Public Works patrol the reservoir and its surroundings.

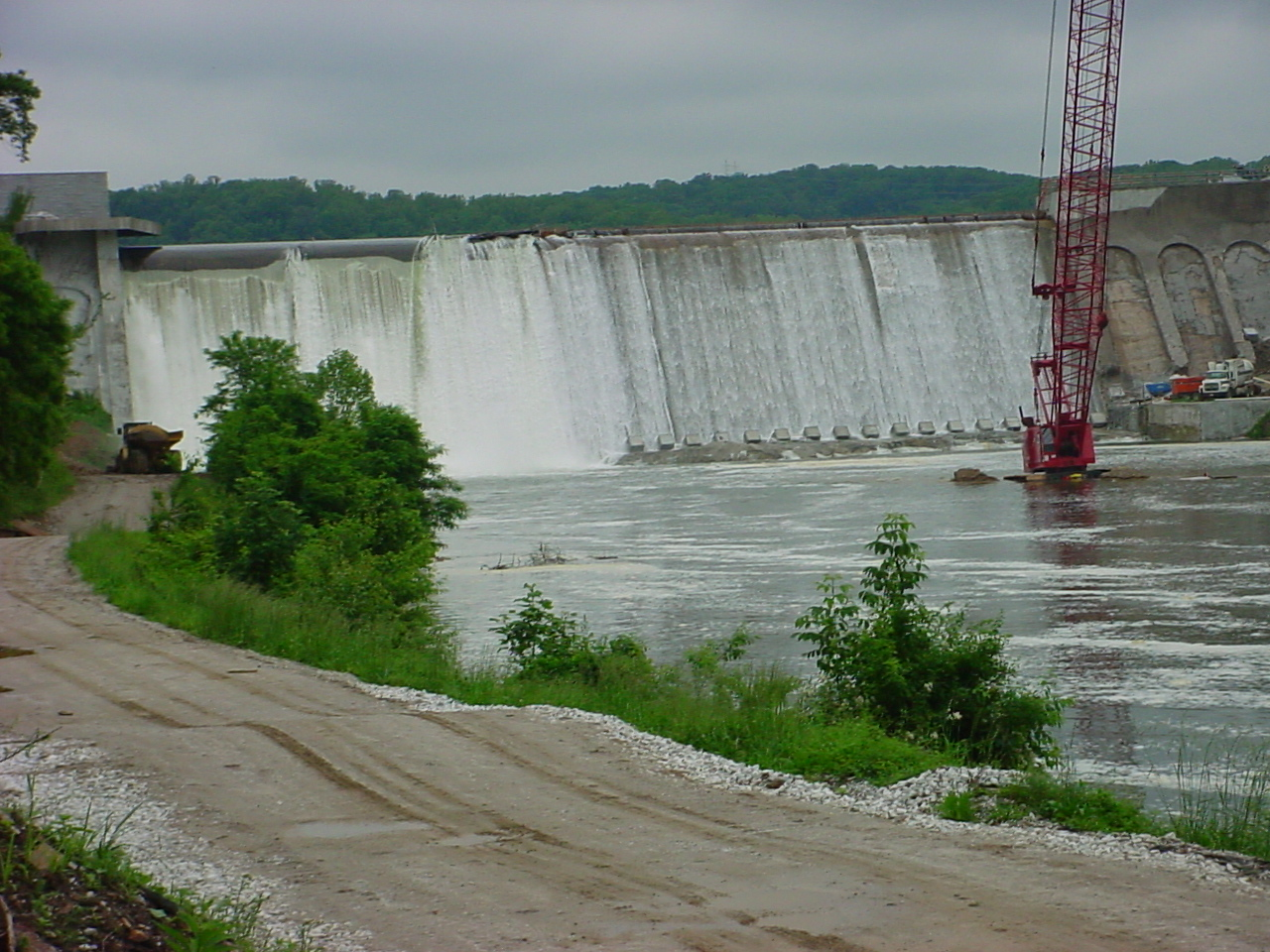
The Loch Raven Dam during rehabilitation and stabilization in 2003
