= Half-Way House (Parkton, Maryland) =

- U.S. National Register of Historic Places
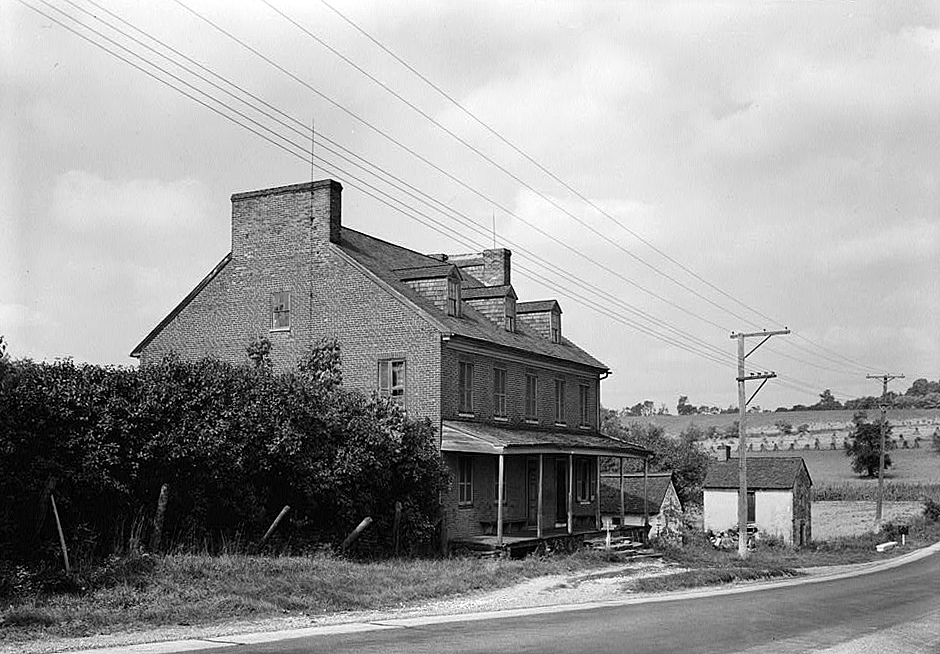
- Half-Way House in 1936

- Location within Maryland Location within the United States
- Location: 18200 York Road (MD 45), Parkton, Maryland
- Coordinates: 39°37′24″N 76°39′31″W
- Area: 1.7 acres (0.69 ha)
- Built: 1810
- Architectural style: Federal
- NRHP reference No.: 80001795
- Added to NRHP: September 8, 1980

- Half-Way House (Boundary Increase)
- U.S. National Register of Historic Places
- Nearest city: Parkton, Maryland
- NRHP reference No.: 89000809
- Added to NRHP: July 12, 1989

Half-Way House, also known as The Wiseburg Inn, is a historic inn and toll house located on York Road at Parkton, Baltimore County, Maryland. It is a large, 2 1/2-story Flemish bond brick structure. The main part, built as an inn about 1810, was placed in front of an earlier log structure which has since been used as a kitchen. The property includes three of the original outbuildings, a stone dairy, a stone laundry, and a board-and-batten shed / ice house. It was built to serve travelers on the newly opened turnpike from Baltimore to York.

It was listed on the National Register of Historic Places in 1980. A boundary increase took place in 1989.
