= Hidden Valley Farm =

Historic farm in Maryland, US

- U.S. National Register of Historic Places
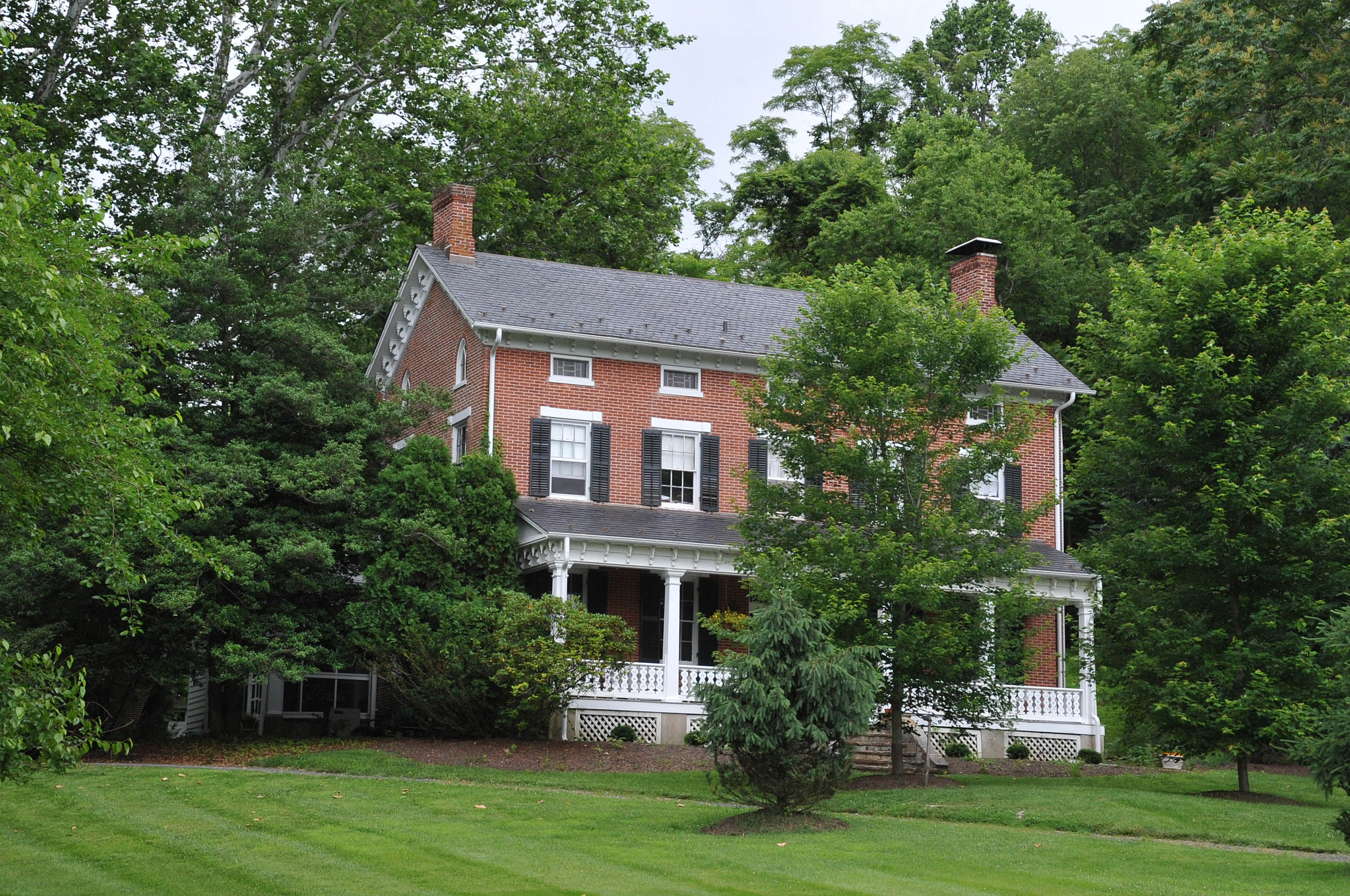
- Hidden Valley Farm in 2007

- Location within Maryland Location within the United States
- Location: 2916 Green Road, Baldwin, Maryland
- Coordinates: 39°31′35″N 76°29′59″W
- Area: 11.6 acres (4.7 ha)
- Built: 1858
- Architectural style: Greek Revival, Gothic Revival
- NRHP reference No.: 83002950
- Added to NRHP: January 17, 1983

Hidden Valley Farm is a historic home and farm complex located at Baldwin, Harford County, Maryland, United States. It consists of a mid-19th century vernacular Greek Revival brick farmhouse with several auxiliary structures. The house is a three-story, rectangular brick dwelling with a gable roof, with a two-story wing. The house features square-columned one-story porches across the façade and both sides of the wing. Also on the property are a mid-19th-century barn, summer kitchen, and smokehouse, as well as a later woodshed and garage.

Hidden Valley Farm was listed on the National Register of Historic Places in 1983.
