= Phoenix, Maryland =

Unincorporated community in Maryland, United States

- Unincorporated community
- Location within the State of Maryland Phoenix (the United States)
- Coordinates: 39°30′59″N 76°36′58″W
- Country: United States
- State: Maryland
- County: Baltimore
- Time zone: UTC-5 (Eastern (EST))
  - Summer (DST): UTC-4 (EDT)
- GNIS feature ID: 591002

Phoenix is an unincorporated community located in Baltimore County in the State of Maryland, United States. It is located at latitude 39°30'59" North, longitude 76°36'59" West. The United States Postal Service has assigned Phoenix the ZIP code 21131.

Part of the area is also known as Jacksonville, although Jacksonville was once a separate community to the east.

Hunt Valley Golf Club, an 18-hole private golf course, is located in Phoenix. The NCR Trail also runs through Phoenix, which hosts one of the rail trail's major parking lots.

Phoenix has an elementary school, Jacksonville Elementary. It also has the Jacksonville Senior Center. The center hosts a variety of activities for seniors age 60 and over and is open five days a week. There is a fitness studio, multipurpose room with kitchen, classrooms, and staff and council offices.

Opportunities for shopping include the community's Manor Shopping Center, with a Safeway grocery store, a 7-Eleven, Walgreens, Bank of America, Bagelmeister, Strapasta Trattoria, Golden House Chinese Takeaway and a liquor store. Phoenix is also served by a second shopping center, Paper Mill Village, home to Bradley's Liquor Store, Scratch and Sniff Pet Supplies, Companion Animal Care Center, the Jacksonville Pharmacy, and several doctors' offices. A second grocery store, Shoprite is adjacent to Paper Mill Village. The town also has two gas stations, a volunteer fire company, and a post office.

Phoenix provided the setting for scenes in Baltimore native John Waters' 1972 cult classic film Pink Flamingos.

Phoenix was also the setting of Route 66 season 2 episode 7, "The Mud Nest", starring Martin Milner and George Maharis. Several local townspeople were featured in the episode.

Historic home Eagle's Nest was listed on the National Register of Historic Places in 1974.

Fashion designer Jhane Barnes was born in Phoenix.

Controlled Demolition, Inc. is headquartered in Phoenix.

== MTBE spill ==
Phoenix was the location of a January 2006 Exxon Mobil gas leak, in which over 26,000 gallons of gas seeped out of a punctured pipe at a station at the intersection of Maryland routes 145 and 146. The area affected by the gas leak was approximately one-half mile downhill from the location of the gas station. Six wells were contaminated, and 62 residential wells showed traces of MTBE. The state filed a $12 million suit against Exxon Mobil in April 2006. In September 2008, the state settled the case with Exxon Mobil, imposing a $4 million civil penalty. In addition, about 300 Jacksonville residents sought compensatory and punitive damages from the company worth several billion dollars. A jury awarded the plaintiffs $1B in punitive damages, which decision was later reversed. This was the largest amount of money ever awarded in history involving oil spills. In March 2009, a Baltimore County jury found Exxon Mobil liable and awarded compensatory damages to the plaintiffs. Several other cases were ongoing as of 2015.
