= Eagle's Nest (Phoenix, Maryland) =

Historic house in Maryland, United States

- U.S. National Register of Historic Places
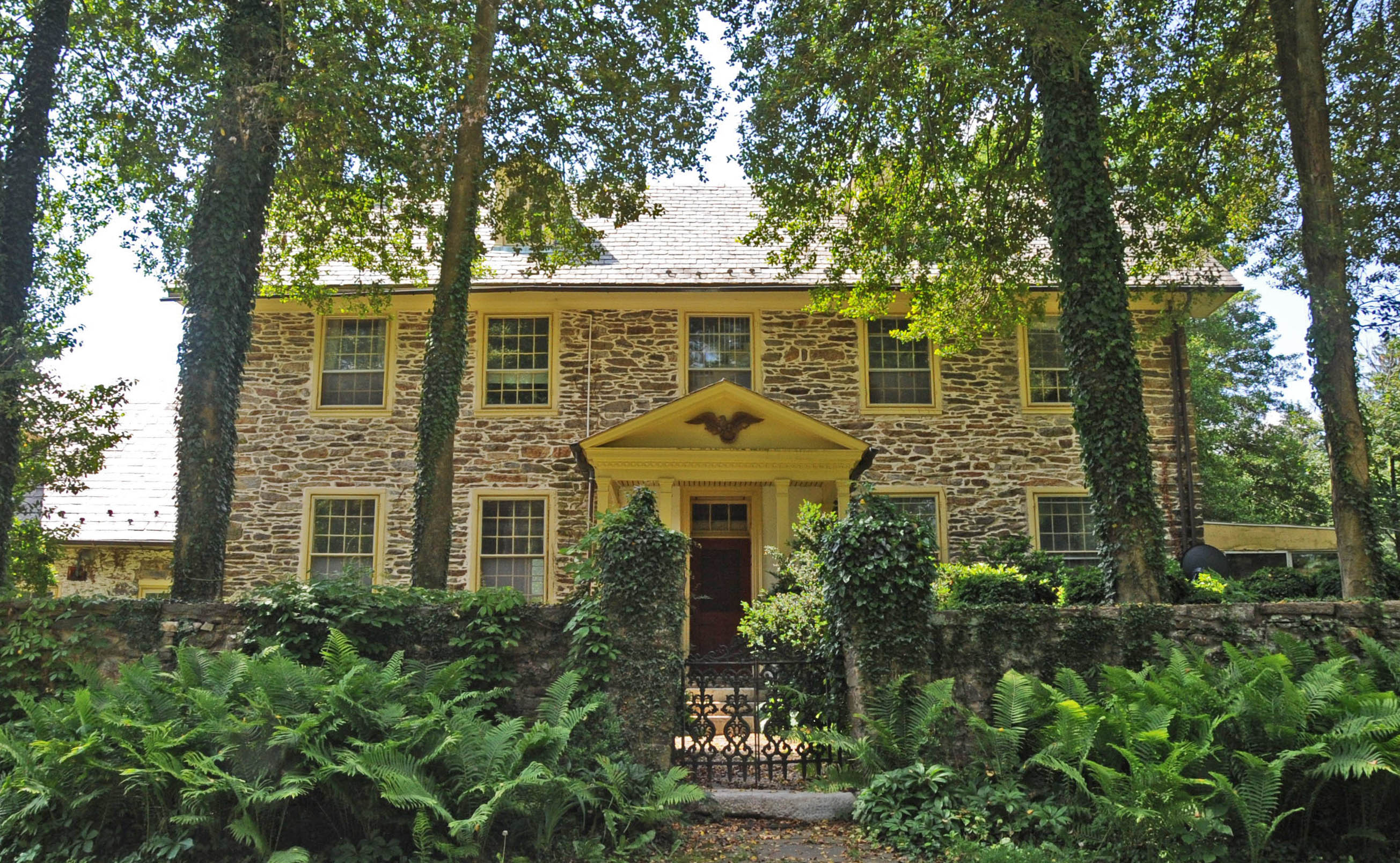

- Location within Maryland Location within the United States
- Location: 12209 Jarrettsville Pike (MD 146), Phoenix, Maryland
- Coordinates: 39°28′15″N 76°34′32″W
- Area: 6 acres (2.4 ha)
- Built: c. 1690s, c. 1750, 1790s-1802
- NRHP reference No.: 74000942
- Added to NRHP: July 25, 1974

The Eagle's Nest is a historic home located at Phoenix, Baltimore County, Maryland. It is a large fieldstone dwelling begun, it is believed, in the 1690s and completed in 1802 on part of a 2500-acre tract named "The Valley of Jehosaphat" by Richard Smith, Jr., who was granted the land by Lord Baltimore in 1684 in recognition of Smith's service as the first attorney general of Maryland. Smith's descendants owned the tract until Walter Dulany bought half of it in the 1720s and the other half about 20 years later.

== Etymology ==
While the origin of the name, "Eagle's Nest", is unknown, one possible explanation has to do with the fact that a Mr. FitzHugh of Virginia married one of famed lawyer Daniel Dulany's sisters and lived with her at "Fitzhugh Farm", adjoining the original "Eagle's Nest" to the north. The FitzHughs owned, among other properties, a plantation north of the James River named, "Eagle's Nest".

== Dulany family ==
The Dulany family was a prosperous mercantile and land-owning family with an extensive trading relationship with England. Their loyalties lay with the Mother Country throughout the American Revolution, the outcome of which left them out of favor. The Eagle's Nest was confiscated, and the house with some acreage was sold at a sheriff's sale to Thomas Marsh, the property's overseer who lived in the house as it was then. Since the Marshes were Quakers, they had no interest in owning slaves, instead producing 10 or more children in each generation. Thomas's son, Joshua, served as a captain in the Revolution and afterward became financially successful in his management of raising and selling crops and livestock. It was he who built the main portion of the house a decade and a half after Hampton Mansion was built. A copy of his portrait still hangs in the house.

== Modern day ==
The three-part house consists of a tall, 2 1/2-story 5-bay Georgian portion and two long 1 1/2-story portions. The newest portion, the garage wing, incorporates timbers salvaged from the old slave quarters before the flooding of the valley in order to create Loch Raven Reservoir. The house features a profusion of original detail including the fine main entrance, the interior woodwork, the original arcade, period outbuildings including the smokehouse, icehouse, springhouse, and root cellar. Foundation ruins of the barn, tenant farmer's house, and tollbooth still stand, though now on neighboring properties.

== Neighborhoods ==
The late-20th-century neighborhoods built on the eastern portion of the original property, including Golden Eagle, Eagle's View, Stone Eagle, and Eagle’s Nest Country Club (formerly Towson Golf & Country Club) derive their names from the name of the original tract.

It was listed on the National Register of Historic Places in 1974, and is listed on the Maryland and Baltimore County historical registers.
