= Baldwin, Maryland =

Unincorporated community in Maryland, United States

- Unincorporated community
- Location within the State of Maryland Baldwin, Maryland (the United States)
- Coordinates: 39°29′41″N 76°28′13″W
- Country: United States
- State: Maryland
- County: Baltimore
- Time zone: UTC−5 (Eastern (EST))
  - Summer (DST): UTC−4 (EDT)
- GNIS feature ID: 589687

Baldwin is an unincorporated community in Baltimore County, Maryland, United States. The USPS has assigned Baldwin the ZIP Code 21013. Until 1958, this community was served by the Maryland and Pennsylvania Railroad at milepost 18.4. Hidden Valley Farm was listed on the National Register of Historic Places in 1983.
