= Maryland Route 222 =

Highway in Maryland

Maryland Route 222
- Maryland Route 222 highlighted in red

Route information
- Maintained by MDSHA
- Length: 11.36 mi (18.28 km)
- Existed: 1972–present
- Tourist routes: Lower Susquehanna Scenic Byway

Major junctions
- South end: MD 7 in Perryville
- US 40 in Perryville; MD 824 in Perryville; I-95 in Perryville; MD 275 / MD 824 in Perryville; MD 276 in Port Deposit
- North end: US 1 near Conowingo

Location
- Country: United States
- State: Maryland
- Counties: Cecil

Highway system
- Maryland highway system; Interstate; US; State; Scenic Byways
← US 222	→ MD 223

Maryland Route 222 (MD 222) is a state highway in the U.S. state of Maryland. The highway runs 11.36 miles (18.28 km) from MD 7 in Perryville north to U.S. Route 1 (US 1) near Conowingo. MD 222 connects Perryville, Port Deposit, and Conowingo along its route paralleling the Susquehanna River in western Cecil County. Because MD 222 in Port Deposit passes over a steep hill and under a low-clearance railroad bridge, trucks traveling between US 222 in Conowingo and Interstate 95 (I-95) are directed to use MD 275, MD 276, and US 1 through Woodlawn and Rising Sun.

MD 222 was built as MD 268, a number presently assigned to North Street in Elkton. The state highway was paved from Perryville to Port Deposit in the late 1910s and early 1920s. MD 268 was extended north to Conowingo in the early 1930s. In 1938, MD 268 was superseded when US 222 was extended south from US 1 in Conowingo to US 40 in Perryville. US 222 was widened from Perryville to Port Deposit in the early 1940s and rebuilt around 1960. The highway was moved for the construction of I-95 interchange in the early 1960s and rebuilt south to Perryville in the late 1960s. MD 222 was established in 1972 on the portion of US 222 between MD 7 and US 40. The designation was extended from Perryville to Conowingo in 1995 when US 222 was rolled back to its former and present terminus at US 1 in Conowingo.

== Route description ==
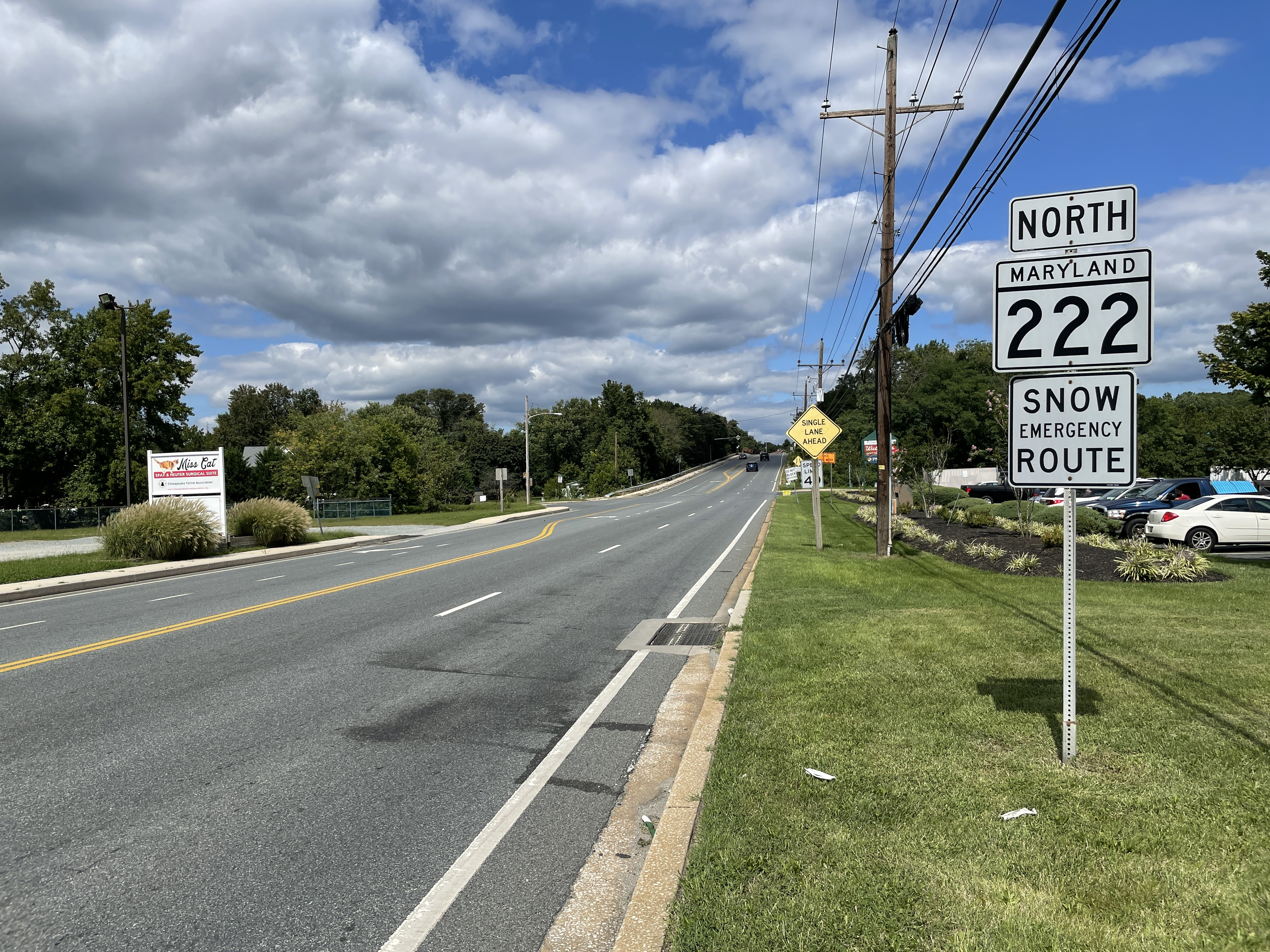
MD 222 northbound past US 40 in Perryville

MD 222 begins at an intersection with MD 7 (Broad Street) in the town of Perryville. The highway heads north as two-lane undivided Aiken Avenue, which reaches its northern end at US 40 (Pulaski Highway) immediately to the east of the Thomas J. Hatem Memorial Bridge over the Susquehanna River. MD 222 continues northeast past US 40 as Perryville Road, which crosses over CSX's Philadelphia Subdivision railroad line. The highway curves north and leaves the town of Perryville, passing west of Perryville High School. MD 222 intersects the southern end of MD 824 (Reservoir Road) and the entrance to the former Perryville Outlet Center to the west before meeting I-95 (John F. Kennedy Memorial Highway) at a four-ramp partial cloverleaf interchange. At the north end of the interchange, the highway briefly re-enters the town of Perryville and intersects the ramps to and from southbound I-95 and Chesapeake Overlook Parkway, which serves as the entrance road to Hollywood Casino Perryville and the Great Wolf Lodge resort to the west. Past here, the road passes west of a park and ride lot before it reaches a four-way intersection with the northern end of MD 824 (Blythedale Road) and the southern end of MD 275 (Perrylawn Drive). At this intersection, MD 222 turns west onto Bainbridge Road toward Port Deposit.

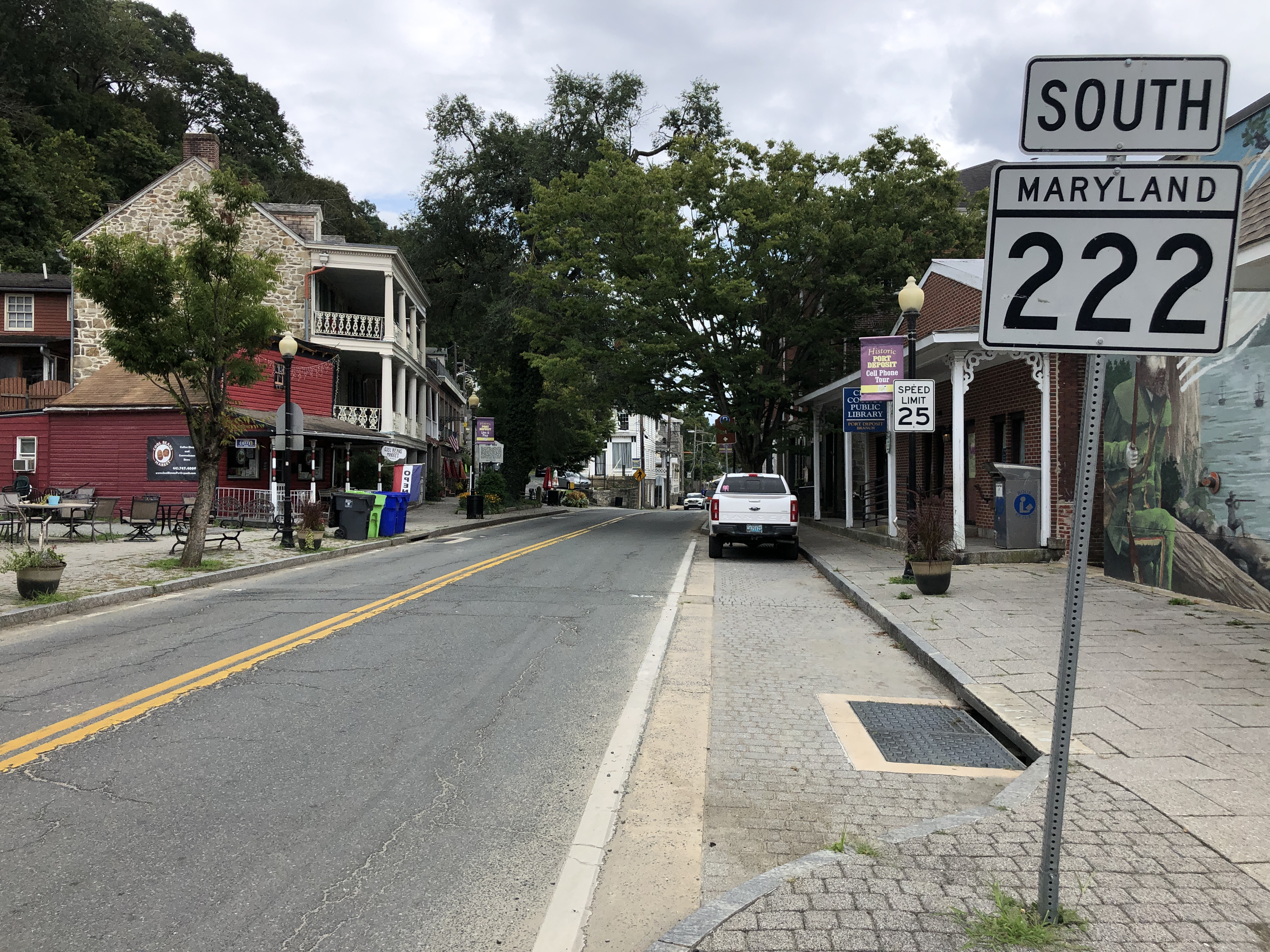
View south along MD 222 at MD 276 in Port Deposit

MD 222 heads west through farmland, crossing Happy Valley Branch before passing the entrance to the former United States Naval Training Center Bainbridge, which contains the Edward W. Haviland House and the original campus of the Tome School. The highway descends from a high bluff to the Susquehanna River, during which southbound MD 222 has a climbing lane. Upon entering the town limits of Port Deposit, MD 222's name changes to Main Street and the highway makes a sharp turn to the north to parallel the river and Norfolk Southern Railway's Port Road Branch, both of which are located southwest of the road. The state highway intersects MD 276 (Center Street) in the center of Port Deposit. MD 222 passes the Paw Paw Building and intersects Granite Avenue before crossing Rock Run and passing under a low-clearance railroad bridge to the west side of the tracks. The highway leaves the town of Port Deposit and continues north as Susquehanna River Road, closely paralleling the river and passing through a unit of Susquehanna State Park along the river. Soon after crossing Octoraro Creek, MD 222 reaches its northern terminus at an intersection with US 1 (Conowingo Road) at the eastern end of Conowingo Dam. Following US 1 northeast to the community of Conowingo leads to the southern terminus of US 222.

MD 222 is a part of the National Highway System as a principal arterial from US 40 north to MD 275 within Perryville.

== History ==
Maryland Route 268
- Location: Perryville–Conowingo
- Length: 11.68 mi (18.80 km)
- Existed: 1927–1938

What is now MD 222 was originally designated MD 268. MD 268 was replaced by a southern extension of US 222 from US 1 at Conowingo to US 40 (now MD 7) in Perryville in 1938. The Susquehanna River Road section of US 222 was transferred from state to county maintenance through a May 8, 1958, road transfer agreement. However, that section was returned to state control through an August 23, 1961, agreement after Cecil County requested it be returned to the state. The American Association of State Highway and Transportation Officials (AASHTO) approved rolling back the southern end of the US 222 designation from US 40 to US 1 at their April 1995 spring meeting. The Maryland State Highway Administration proposed and AASHTO approved the redesignation of US 222 to MD 222 from US 40 to US 1 in February 1996; however, the new designation had already been enacted officially and marked publicly in 1995. The redesignation did not apply to Aiken Avenue; indeed, Aiken Avenue's designation was changed from US 222 to MD 222 in 1972.

The first stretch of the Perryville–Conowingo highway to be improved was in Perryville, where Cecil County constructed with state aid a macadam road from the Aikin station on the Baltimore and Ohio Railroad south toward the Post Road (now MD 7) by 1910. Cecil County extended the macadam road to the Post Road by 1919. The highway from the Aikin railroad crossing to Port Deposit was paved as a 15-foot-long (4.6 m) concrete road in two sections: from the railroad to near Port Deposit by 1921 and through Port Deposit by 1923. MD 268 was paved as a concrete road from Port Deposit to US 1 at Conowingo Dam between 1930 and 1933; the construction work included repurposing a railroad bridge across Octoraro Creek as a highway bridge. MD 268's bridge across the Baltimore and Ohio Railroad was constructed between 1931 and 1934. The old highway approaching the Aikin grade crossing became MD 449.

MD 268 was proposed to be widened to 20 feet (6.1 m) from US 40 to US 1 in 1934. The portion of US 222 from US 40 to near Port Deposit was expanded to improve access between the U.S. Highway and United States Naval Training Center Bainbridge, east of Port Deposit in 1942 and 1944. US 222 was widened and resurfaced between what is now the MD 222–MD 275—MD 824 intersection and Port Deposit in 1959 and 1960. The U.S. Highway was relocated as part of the construction of its original diamond interchange with I-95 in 1962 and 1963. The old alignment of US 222 east of its I-95 interchange became MD 824. The highway was resurfaced with bituminous concrete from MD 7 to US 40 and reconstructed and widened from US 40 to the southern MD 824 intersection in 1968 and 1969. The widening work included widening US 222's bridge across the Baltimore and Ohio Railroad, which was removed and replaced between 1987 and 1989. The I-95 interchange was converted from a standard diamond to a four-ramp partial cloverleaf with all four ramps east of MD 222 between 1993 and 1994. Aiken Avenue was reconstructed in an urban streetscape project in 2001 and 2002.

== Junction list ==
The entire route is in Cecil County.

Location	mi	km	Destinations	Notes
Perryville	0.00	0.00	MD 7 (Broad Street)	Southern terminus
Perryville	0.67	1.08	US 40 (Pulaski Highway) – Baltimore, Philadelphia	
Perryville	2.02	3.25	MD 824 north (Blythedale Road)	Southern terminus of MD 824
Perryville	2.40	3.86	I-95 (John F. Kennedy Memorial Highway) – Baltimore, New York	I-95 Exit 93
Perryville	2.85	4.59	MD 275 north (Perrylawn Drive) to US 222 north – Rising Sun MD 824 south (Blythedale Road)	MD 222 turns west onto Bainbridge Road; southern terminus of MD 275; northern terminus of MD 824
Port Deposit	5.90	9.50	MD 276 north (Center Street) – Rising Sun	Southern terminus of MD 276
Conowingo	11.36	18.28	US 1 (Conowingo Road) to US 222 north – Bel Air, Rising Sun	Northern terminus
1.000 mi = 1.609 km; 1.000 km = 0.621 mi

== Related routes ==
=== Former truck route ===
Maryland Route 222 Truck
- Location: Perryville–Conowingo
- Length: 12.49 mi (20.10 km)
- Existed: c. 2002–c. 2016

Maryland Route 222 Truck was a signed 12.49-mile (20.10 km) truck bypass of MD 222 from MD 222 in Perryville to US 1 and US 222 in Conowingo. The signed route followed MD 275 from MD 222 in Perryville north to MD 276 in Woodlawn. MD 222 Truck continued north on MD 276 from Woodlawn north to US 1 west of Rising Sun. The truck route then headed west on US 1 (in a wrong-way concurrency) to US 222's southern terminus in Conowingo. MD 222 Truck was first signed by 2002. Signs for MD 222 Truck were removed by 2016 and replaced with signs directing trucks to I-95 and US 40 southbound and to US 222 northbound.

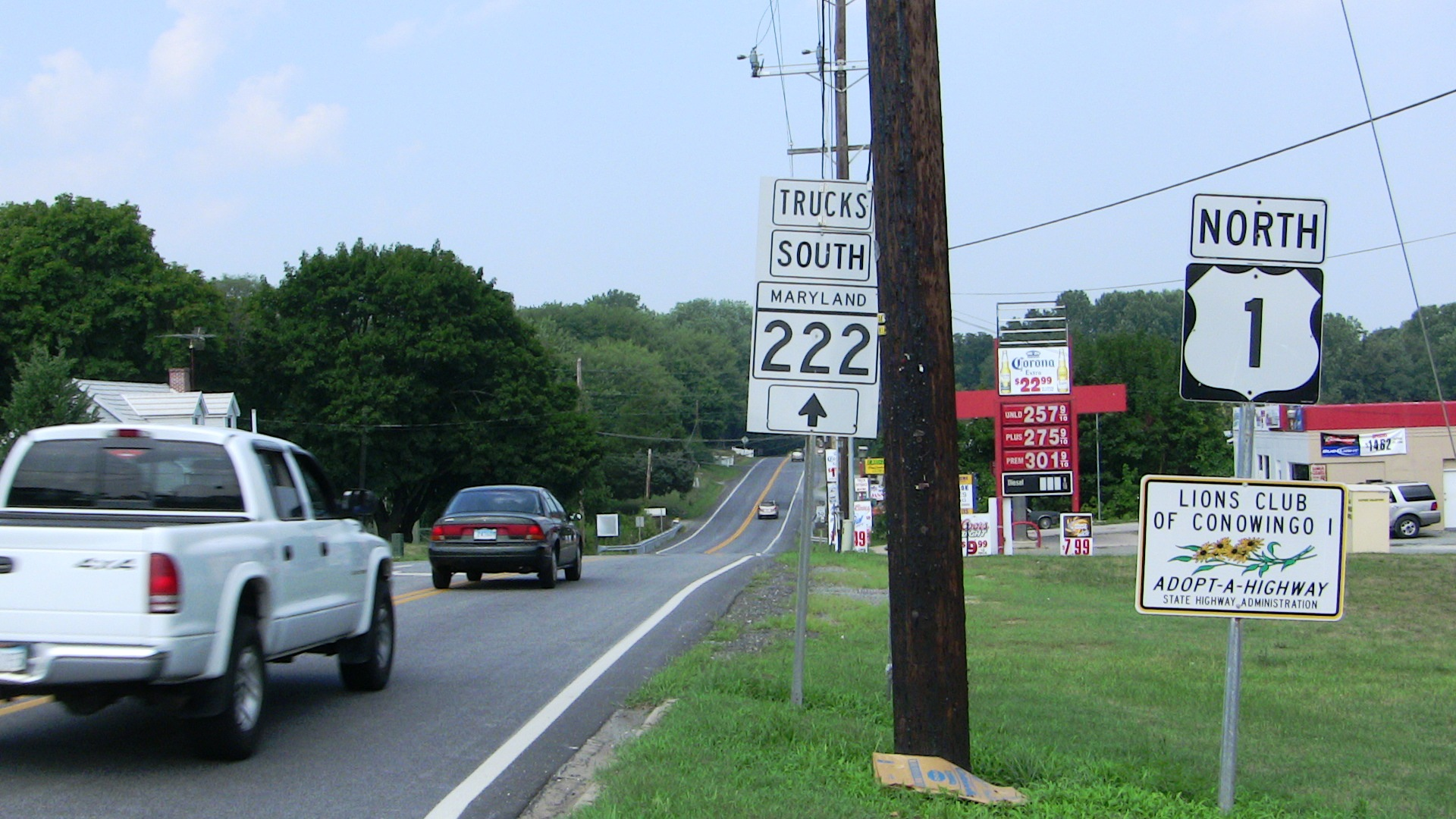
Beginning of MD 222 Truck at the southern terminus of US 222 in 2010

Junction list
The entire route was in Cecil County.

Location	mi	km	Destinations	Notes
Perryville	0.00	0.00	MD 222 (Bainbridge Road/Perryville Road) / MD 824 south (Blythedale Road) to I-95 – Port Deposit MD 275 begins	Southern terminus of MD 275 and MD 222 Truck
Woodlawn	2.22	3.57	MD 276 south (Jacob Tome Memorial Highway) – Port Deposit MD 275 ends	Northern terminus of MD 275; south end MD 276 overlap
Harrisville	7.33	11.80	MD 273 (Rising Sun Road) – Harrisville, Rising Sun	Roundabout
Harrisville	7.82	12.59	US 1 north (Rising Sun Bypass) – Philadelphia MD 276 ends	Northern terminus of MD 276; south end of US 1 overlap
Harrisville	8.72	14.03	MD 273 east (Rising Sun Road) – Rising Sun, Newark	Western terminus of MD 273; direct ramp from northbound US 1/southbound MD 222 Truck to eastbound MD 273 is MD 273A
	9.82	15.80	MD 591 south (Porters Bridge Road)	Northern terminus of MD 591; officially MD 591B
	10.88	17.51	MD 591 north (Colora Road)	Southern terminus of MD 591; officially MD 591A
Conowingo	12.49	20.10	US 1 south (Conowingo Road) to MD 222 – Bel Air, Perryville US 222 north (Rock Springs Road) / Rowlandsville Road south	Northern terminus of MD 222 Truck; southern terminus of US 222
1.000 mi = 1.609 km; 1.000 km = 0.621 mi: Concurrency terminus

=== Auxiliary routes ===
MD 222 has three auxiliary routes that are maintained by the Maryland Transportation Authority (MDTA) and provide access to the authority's facilities around I-95's interchange with MD 222 and the John F. Kennedy Memorial Highway toll plaza to the east of the Millard E. Tydings Memorial Bridge. The highways were created as part of the reconstruction of MD 222's interchange with I-95 in 1993 and 1994.

- MD 222A is the designation for Chesapeake Overlook Parkway, a 0.09-mile (0.14 km) spur west from the intersection of MD 222 and the ramps to and from southbound I-95. This spur intersects MD 222B near its western end and serves as the entrance to Hollywood Casino Perryville and the Great Wolf Lodge resort. MD 222A was assigned in 1994, and the highway received its name in 2010.
- MD 222B is the designation for Turnpike Drive, a 0.89-mile (1.43 km) service road that heads south from MD 222A and veers west to parallel the southbound lanes of I-95. The state highway provides access to the MDTA administration building, the Perryville barracks of the Maryland State Police, and the adjacent truck weigh station on southbound I-95. MD 222B follows part of the course of what was the entrance ramp from MD 222 to southbound I-95.
- MD 222C is the designation for G.R. Dawson Drive, a 0.48-mile (0.77 km) service road that heads west from MD 222 and parallels the northbound lanes of I-95. The state highway provides access to a truck weigh station on northbound I-95. MD 222C follows part of the course of what was the northbound I-95 exit ramp to MD 222. The designation was assigned in 1995, and the highway received its name in 2006.
