= Maryland 222 =

In the context of the U.S. state of Maryland, Maryland 222 may refer to:

- The portion of U.S. Route 222 in Maryland
- Maryland Route 222, a state highway
