= Maryland Route 275 =

State highway in Maryland, United States

Maryland Route 275
- Perrylawn Drive
- Maryland Route 275 highlighted in red

Route information
- Maintained by MDSHA
- Length: 2.22 mi (3.57 km)
- Existed: 1967–present

Major junctions
- South end: MD 222 / MD 824 in Perryville
- North end: MD 276 in Woodlawn

Location
- Country: United States
- State: Maryland
- Counties: Cecil

Highway system
- Maryland highway system; Interstate; US; State; Scenic Byways
← MD 274	→ MD 276

Maryland Route 275 (MD 275) is a state highway in the U.S. state of Maryland. Known as Perrylawn Drive, the highway runs 2.22 miles (3.57 km) from MD 222 and MD 824 in Perryville north to MD 276 in Woodlawn in western Cecil County. MD 275 provides an eastern bypass of the town of Port Deposit. The state highway also serves to connect the town of Rising Sun (via MD 276) and Interstate 95 (I-95). MD 275 was constructed along a new alignment in the mid-1960s.

== Route description ==
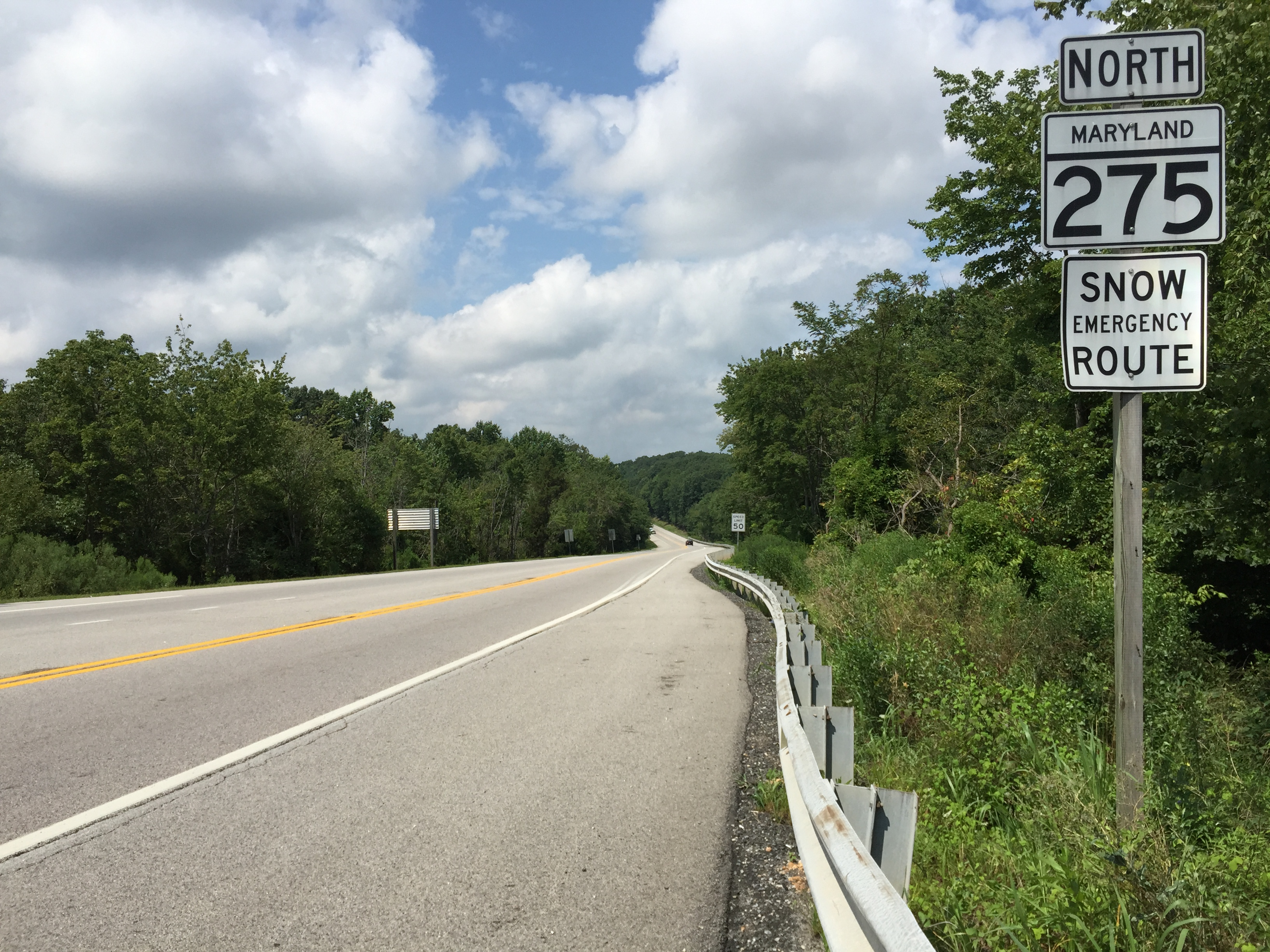
View north along MD 275 at MD 222 and MD 824 in Perryville

MD 275 begins at a four-way intersection with MD 222 and MD 824 (Blythedale Road) in the town of Perryville. MD 222 heads west toward Port Deposit as Bainbridge Road and south as Perryville Road toward an interchange with I-95 (John F. Kennedy Memorial Highway) and the center of Perryville. MD 275 heads north as Perrylawn Drive, a limited-access two-lane undivided highway. The highway heads north along a long, sweeping curve that passes to the east of the town limits of Port Deposit. MD 275 parallels Mill Creek and crosses the stream twice along its course. The state highway reaches its northern terminus at MD 276 (Jacob Tome Memorial Highway) in the community of Woodlawn.

MD 275 is a part of the National Highway System as a principal arterial for its entire length.

== History ==
MD 275 was constructed along a new alignment between July 1965 and October 1967.

== Junction list ==
The entire route is in Cecil County.

Location	mi	km	Destinations	Notes
Perryville	0.00	0.00	MD 222 (Bainbridge Road/Perryville Road) to I-95 – Port Deposit MD 824 south (Blythedale Road)	Southern terminus; northern terminus of MD 824
Woodlawn	2.22	3.57	MD 276 (Jacob Tome Memorial Highway) to US 222 north – Port Deposit, Rising Sun	Northern terminus
1.000 mi = 1.609 km; 1.000 km = 0.621 mi
