= Maryland Route 824 =

State highway in Maryland, United States

Maryland Route 824
- Blythedale Road
- Maryland Route 824 highlighted in red

Route information
- Maintained by MDSHA
- Length: 1.06 mi (1.71 km)
- Existed: 1952–present

Major junctions
- South end: MD 222 in Perryville
- North end: MD 222 / MD 275 in Perryville

Location
- Country: United States
- State: Maryland
- Counties: Cecil

Highway system
- Maryland highway system; Interstate; US; State; Scenic Byways
← MD 822	→ MD 825

Maryland Route 824 (MD 824) is a state highway in the U.S. state of Maryland. Known as Blythedale Road, the state highway, which is officially MD 824A, runs 1.06 miles (1.71 km) from MD 222 north to MD 222 and MD 275 in Perryville in western Cecil County. MD 824 is the old alignment of U.S. Route 222 (US 222), which is now MD 222, in Perryville. MD 824 was assigned to the old road after US 222 was relocated for its interchange with Interstate 95 (I-95) in the early 1960s.

== Route description ==
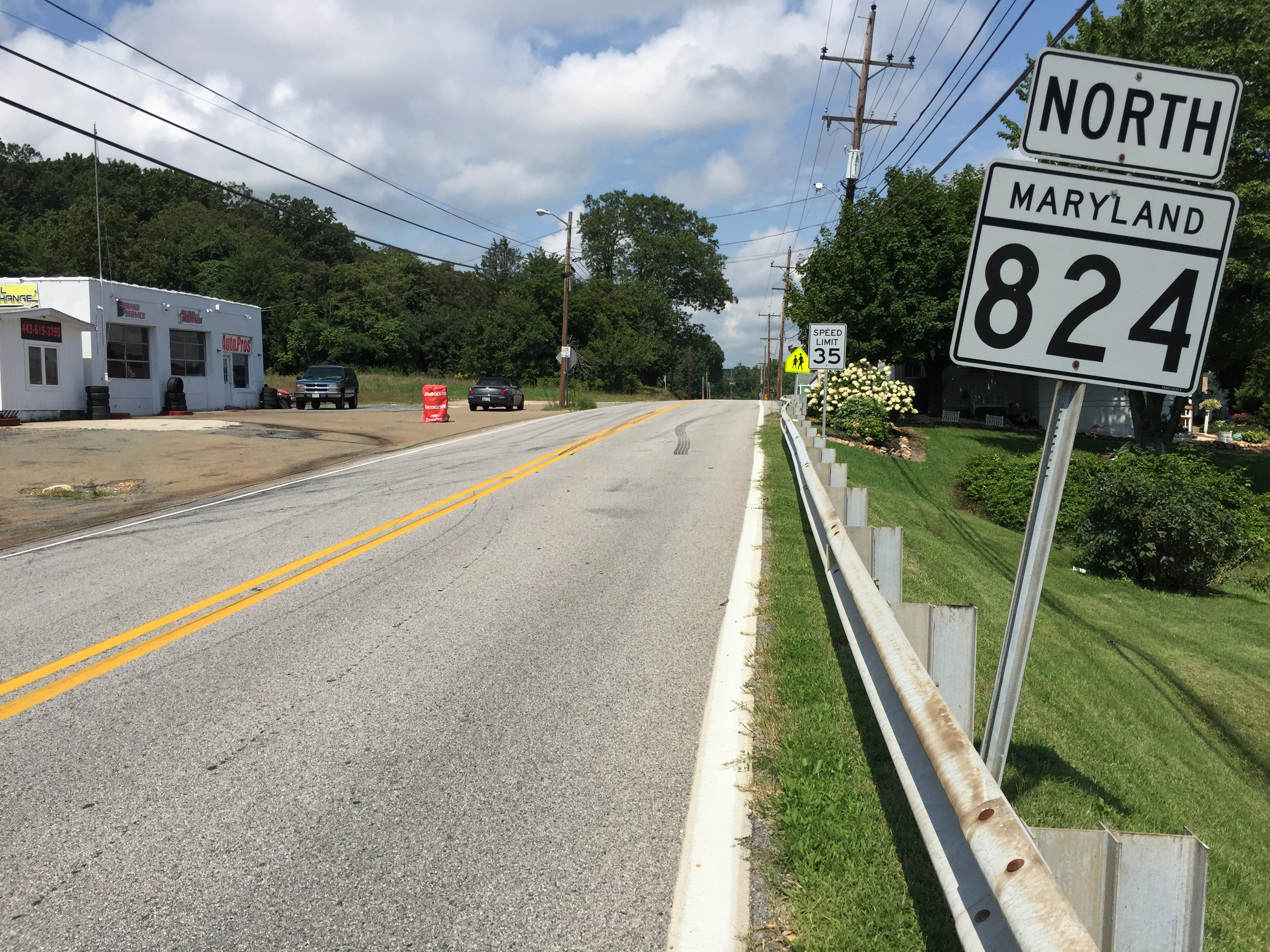
View north at the south end of MD 824 at MD 222 in Blythedale

MD 824 begins at an intersection with MD 222 (Perryville Road) in the hamlet of Blythedale between downtown Perryville and MD 222's interchange with I-95 (John F. Kennedy Memorial Highway). The highway starts east as Reservoir Road but immediately turns north along two-lane undivided Blythedale Road. After passing under I-95 and intersecting Principio Road in the valley of Mill Creek, MD 824 curves to the west toward its northern terminus at a four-way intersection with MD 222 and MD 275. MD 222 heads south toward the I-95 interchange as Perryville Road and west as Bainbridge Road toward Port Deposit, and MD 275 heads north as Perrylawn Drive toward Rising Sun.

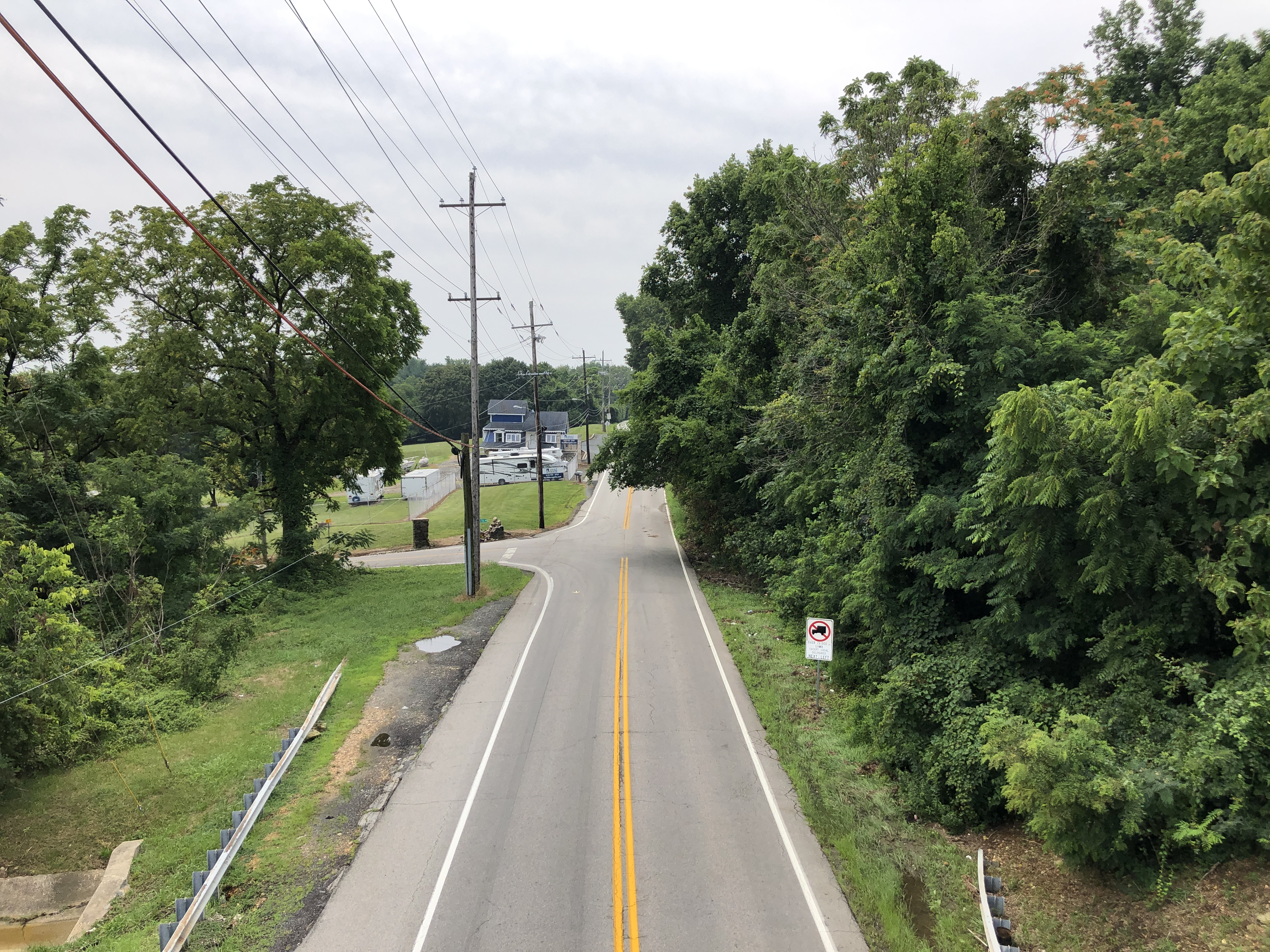
View south along MD 824 from I-95 in Blythedale

== History ==
MD 824 is the old alignment of US 222, and its course was originally constructed as MD 268. The highway was constructed as a 15-foot-wide (4.6 m) concrete road in 1920 and 1921. MD 268 was replaced by a southern extension of US 222 from Conowingo to Perryville in 1938. The highway was proposed to be widened to 20 feet (6.1 m) in 1934, and that expansion came between 1942 and 1944 when US 222 was expanded to improve access between US 40 and United States Naval Training Center Bainbridge, east of Port Deposit. MD 824A was assigned to the highway after US 222 was relocated for its interchange with I-95 when the freeway was constructed in 1962 and 1963. The highway was resurfaced in 1978.

== Junction list ==
The entire route is in Perryville, Cecil County.

mi	km	Destinations	Notes
0.00	0.00	MD 222 (Perryville Road)	Southern terminus
1.06	1.71	MD 222 (Bainbridge Road/Perryville Road) – Port Deposit MD 275 north (Perrylawn Drive) – Rising Sun	Northern terminus; southern terminus of MD 275
1.000 mi = 1.609 km; 1.000 km = 0.621 mi

== Auxiliary route ==
MD 824 (without suffix) was the designation for Weaver's Corner Road, which extended for 0.05 miles (0.080 km) parallel to US 222 between a pair of dead ends on both sides of Old Conowingo Road at Oakwood. The highway was assigned after US 222 was relocated through Oakwood in 1951 and 1952. MD 824 was transferred from state to county maintenance through a December 27, 1979, road transfer agreement.
