= U.S. Route 222 =

Highway in Maryland and Pennsylvania

U.S. Route 222
- US 222 highlighted in red

Route information
- Auxiliary route of US 22
- Maintained by MDSHA and PennDOT
- Length: 94.96 mi (152.82 km)
- Existed: 1926–present

Major junctions
- South end: US 1 in Conowingo, MD
- PA 372 in Quarryville, PA; PA 272 in Willow Street, PA; US 30 in Lancaster, PA; US 322 in Ephrata, PA; PA 272 / PA 568 near Adamstown, PA; US 422 near Reading, PA; PA 12 near Reading, PA; PA 61 near Reading, PA; PA 73 in Maiden Creek, PA; PA 100 in Trexlertown, PA
- North end: I-78 / PA 222 / PA 309 in Dorneyville, PA

Location
- Country: United States
- States: Maryland, Pennsylvania
- Counties: MD: Cecil; PA: Lancaster, Berks, Lehigh

Highway system
- United States Numbered Highway System; List; Special; Divided
- Maryland highway system; Interstate; US; State; Scenic Byways
- Pennsylvania State Route System; Interstate; US; State; Scenic; Legislative
← MD 221	MD	→ MD 222
← PA 221	PA	→ PA 222

U.S. Route 222 (US 222) is a U.S. Highway that is a spur of US 22 in the states of Maryland and Pennsylvania. It runs for 95 miles (153 km) from US 1 in Conowingo, Maryland, north to the junction of Interstate 78 (I-78) and Pennsylvania Route 309 (PA 309) in Dorneyville, Pennsylvania. US 222 is almost entirely in Pennsylvania, and serves as the state's principal artery between the Lancaster and Reading areas in the west and the Lehigh Valley in the east.

US 222 heads north from US 1 in Conowingo and soon crosses from Maryland into Pennsylvania, continuing north through rural areas and passing through Quarryville and Willow Street before reaching Lancaster. The route passes through Lancaster on a one-way pair of city streets before becoming a freeway at US 30 north of the city. The US 222 freeway heads northeast, crossing US 322 in Ephrata and coming to an indirect interchange with the Pennsylvania Turnpike (I-76).

US 222 bypasses Reading to the west, where it forms a concurrency with US 422. The freeway section ends past Reading and the route continues northeast through rural areas, with a freeway bypass of Kutztown. US 222 bypasses Trexlertown on a multilane divided expressway before coming to its northern terminus at I-78/PA 309 in Dorneyville, where the road continues into Allentown as PA 222.

== Route description ==
=== Conowingo to Lancaster ===
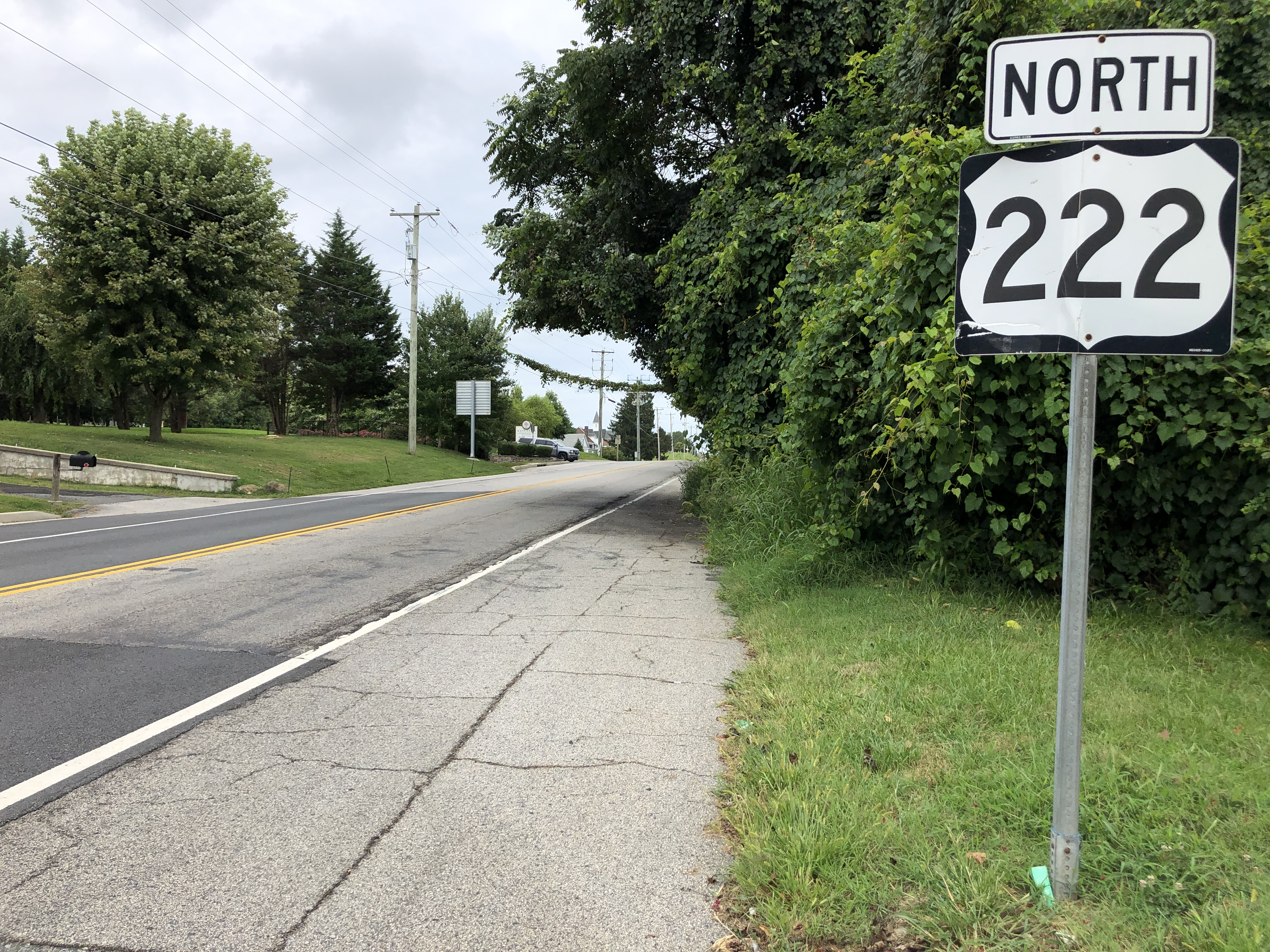
View north at the south end of US 222 at US 1 in Conowingo

US 222 begins at an intersection with US 1 in Conowingo in Cecil County, Maryland. Following US 1 southwest to the Conowingo Dam across the Susquehanna River leads to the northern terminus of MD 222. From this intersection, the route heads northwest on two-lane undivided Rock Springs Road, passing through a mix of fields and woods with some homes. The road curves to the north through woodland and passes east of Oakwood. US 222 turns to the northeast and runs through fields and woods with some development, passing to the southeast of the Rock Springs Generation Facility in Rock Springs before it comes to the Mason–Dixon line, which marks the border between Maryland and Pennsylvania.

Upon crossing the Mason–Dixon line, US 222 enters Fulton Township in Lancaster County, Pennsylvania, and heads north as Robert Fulton Highway, passing between woodland to the west and farm fields to the east. The route turns to the north-northwest and runs through agricultural areas with some trees and homes, passing through New Texas Lyles. The road continues through rural areas and curves to the north, heading into Wakefield and coming to an intersection with PA 272. At this point, PA 272 turns north for a concurrency with US 222 along Robert Fulton Highway, running through a mix of farms and homes. PA 272 splits from US 222 in Penn Hill by heading northwest, and US 222 continues northeast through wooded areas. The road heads into a mix of fields and woods and reaches Goshen, where it turns to the north. The route runs through farmland with some woods and homes, curving northeast before heading back to the north and passing to the east of the Robert Fulton Birthplace. US 222 continues north-northeast through rural land and passes through Bethel, where it crosses into Little Britain Township. The road heads north and enters East Drumore Township, continuing through farmland with some trees and residences and passing through the communities of Unicorn and Mechanics Grove. The route passes east of Solanco High School and bends to the north-northwest as it runs through more rural land.

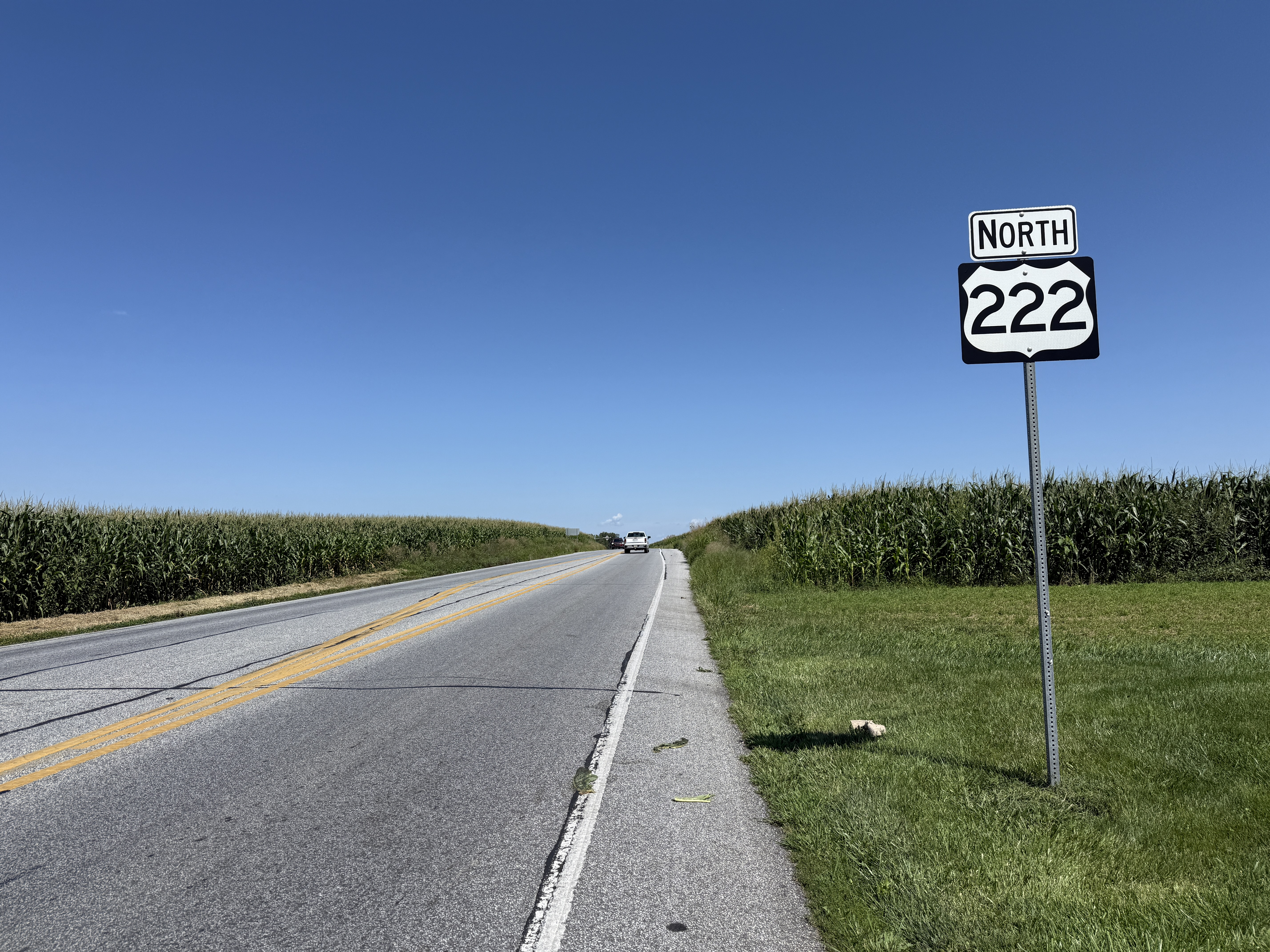
US 222 northbound in West Lampeter Township

US 222 enters the borough of Quarryville and becomes South Church Street, heading north past homes. The route comes to an intersection with PA 372, at which point it turns west-southwest to join that route on West State Street, running through more residential areas. US 222 splits from PA 372 by heading northwest onto West 4th Street, passing between businesses to the southwest and homes to the northeast before running through more residential areas, cutting through a corner of East Drumore Township before heading into Providence Township. At this point, the route enters the Pennsylvania Dutch Country of eastern Lancaster County, which is home to many Amish farms. In Providence Township, the route becomes Beaver Valley Pike and passes under the Enola Low Grade Trail before it runs through a mix of farmland, woodland, and residential and commercial development. The road crosses the Big Beaver Creek into Strasburg Township and heads northwest through more rural land with some development, with the creek parallel to the southwest. The creek bends away to the west and US 222 continues into agricultural areas with occasional homes, passing through Martinsville and turning to the west-northwest. The route passes to the northeast of Refton and curves northwest, crossing the Pequea Creek into West Lampeter Township. The road heads north through farmland and bends northwest to reach an intersection with PA 741. Here, PA 741 becomes concurrent with US 222 and the two routes curve to the west-southwest, passing between farm fields to the north and residential and commercial development to the south and heading into Willow Street, where the road comes to an intersection with PA 272, which is split into a one-way pair at this point.

At this point, US 222 splits from PA 741 by turning north to join PA 272 along Willow Street Pike, a one-way pair which carries two lanes in each direction. PA 272 becomes unsigned along the US 222 concurrency. Both directions of Willow Street Pike rejoin and it continues north as a two-lane undivided road past commercial development before it runs through wooded residential areas, passing through Hollinger. US 222/PA 272 crosses Mill Creek and heads through Lyndon. The road briefly gains a center left-turn lane as it continues through wooded areas of development and passes to the west of a golf course. US 222/PA 272 splits into a one-way pair, with two lanes in each direction, and crosses the Conestoga River into Lancaster Township.

=== Lancaster to Reading ===
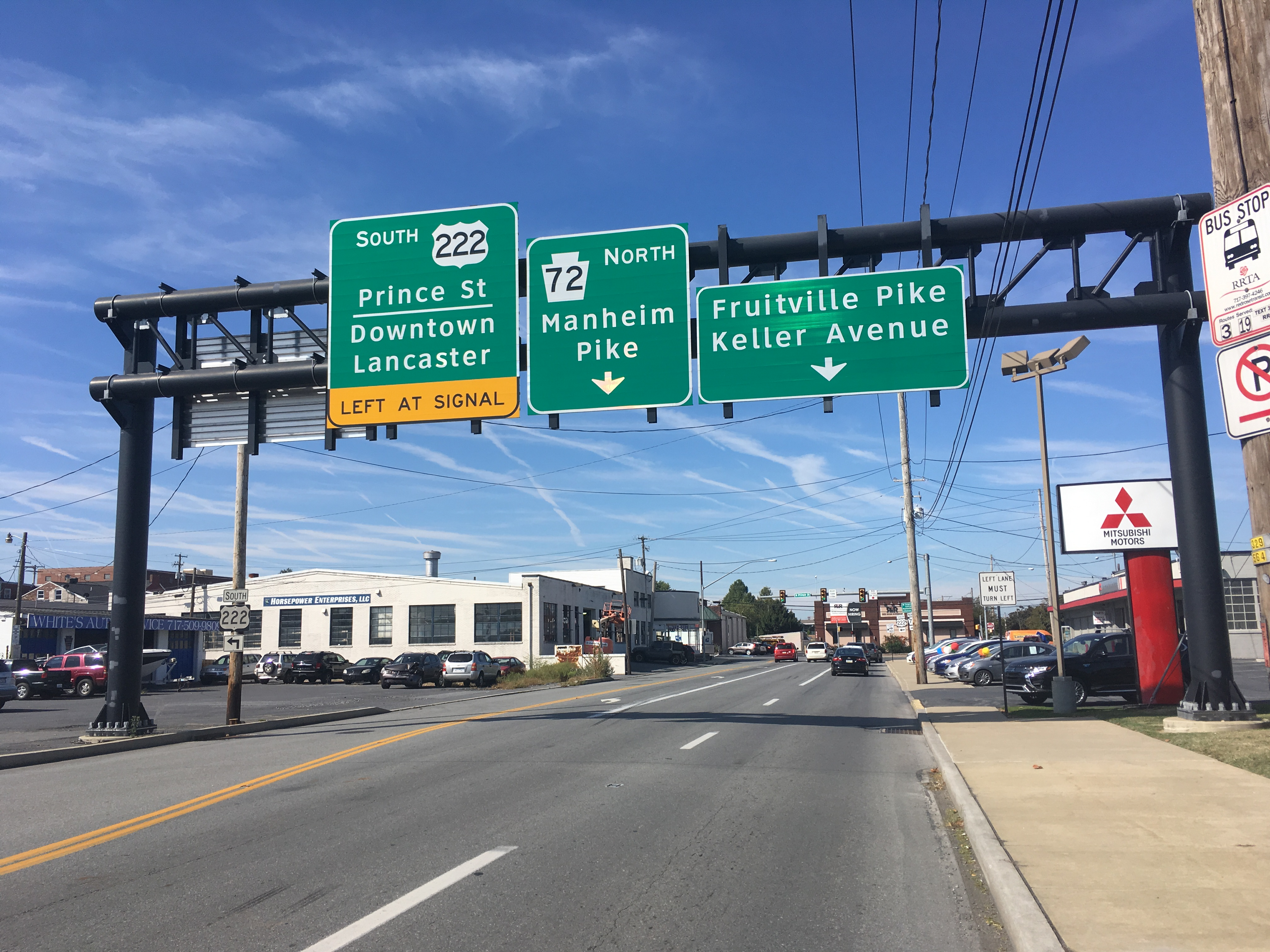
US 222/PA 272 southbound and PA 72 northbound approaching Prince Street in Lancaster

After crossing the Conestoga River, northbound US 222/PA 272 becomes Highland Avenue and southbound US 222/PA 272 is called South Prince Street. The southbound direction intersects PA 324 in Engleside before the two routes continue into the city of Lancaster, heading into urban residential and commercial areas. A short distance after entering Lancaster, northbound US 222/PA 272 intersects the end of one-way northbound PA 324 and heads onto South Queen Street. The two routes continues past urban rowhouses along South Queen Street northbound and South Prince Street southbound, with South Queen Street passing to the west of Woodward Hill Cemetery. Northbound US 222/PA 272 splits from South Queen Street by heading northeast onto Church Street, which carries three lanes of one-way traffic, while northbound PA 72 starts along South Queen Street. Just south of downtown Lancaster, the northbound direction of the route turns north onto South Lime Street, which carries two lanes of one-way traffic. US 222/PA 272 heads into the commercial downtown of Lancaster and crosses eastbound PA 462 at King Street. Past this, the route becomes North Lime Street northbound and North Prince Street southbound, crossing eastbound PA 23 at Chestnut Street and westbound PA 23/PA 462 at Walnut Street. The two routes leave the downtown area and run through urban areas of homes and businesses. The northbound direction passes to the east of Lancaster General Hospital between East James and East Frederick streets while the southbound direction passes to the east of Penn Medicine Park, home of the Lancaster Stormers baseball team, north of the Harrisburg Avenue/West James Street intersection. At the intersection with Liberty Street, northbound US 222/PA 272 shifts west a block onto four-lane undivided North Duke Street, a two-way road, while the one-way pair continues into Manheim Township. A block later, at McGovern Avenue, both directions of US 222/PA 272 rejoin along North Duke Street. Southbound US 222/PA 272 follows McGovern Avenue west between North Duke Street and North Prince Street, forming the border between a portion of the city of Lancaster that is home to the Lancaster station along Amtrak's Keystone Corridor railroad line to the north and Manheim Township to the south. The roadway is a three-lane road with two westbound lanes that carry southbound US 222/PA 272 and one eastbound lane. McGovern Avenue reaches an intersection with northbound PA 72 at North Queen Street, where northbound PA 72 turns west to join southbound US 222/PA 272 along the road. At North Prince Street, southbound US 222/PA 272 turn south while PA 72 becomes two-way heading north.

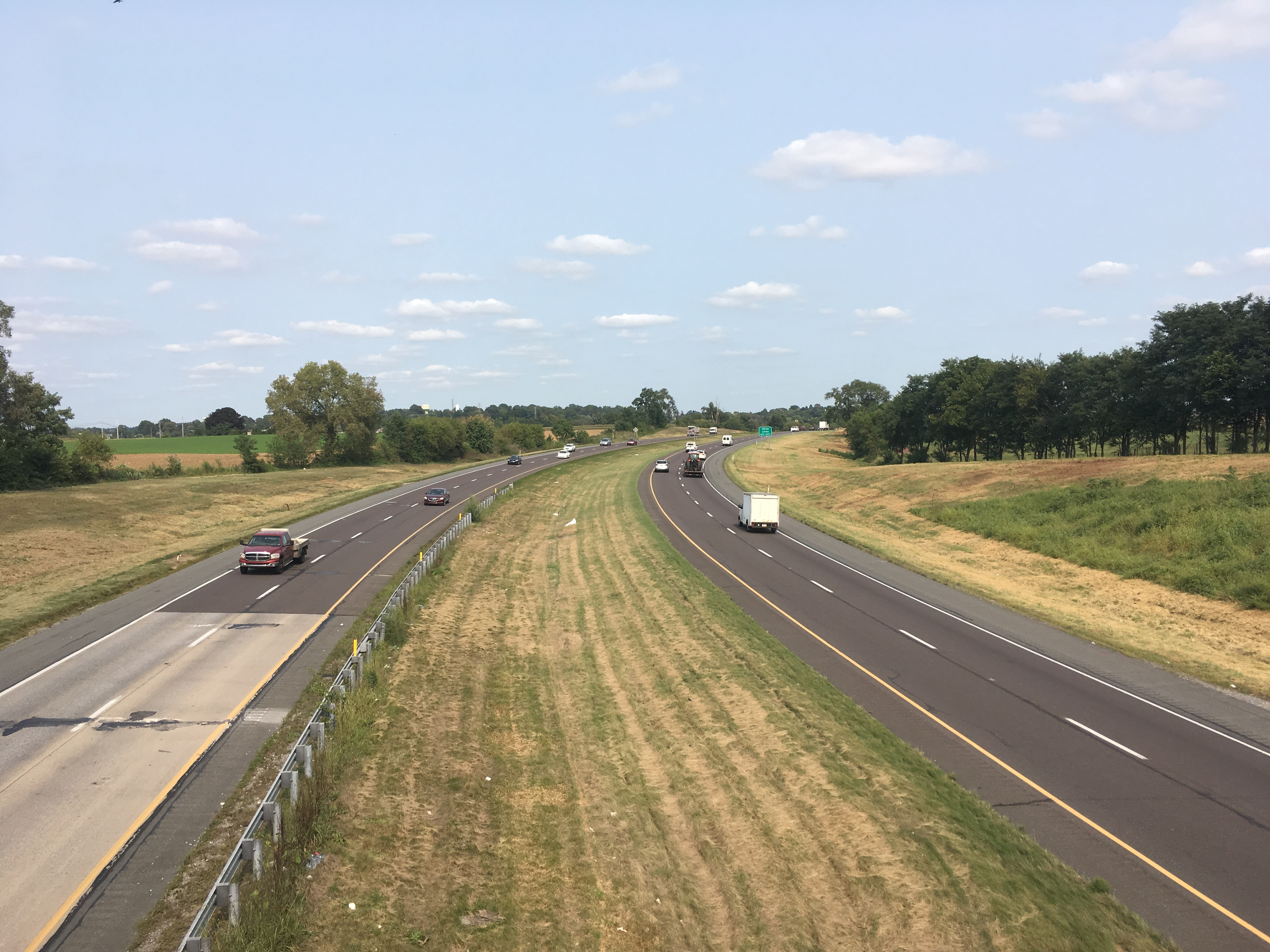
US 222 northbound in Manheim Township

Both directions of US 222/PA 272 continue north along four-lane undivided North Duke Street and the road reaches the Thaddeus Stevens Bridge over Amtrak's Keystone Corridor, where it becomes the border between Manheim Township to the west and Lancaster to the east. At Keller Avenue/Marshall Avenue, the road name changes to Lititz Pike and it fully enters Manheim Township, running through commercial areas as a five-lane road with a center left-turn lane. Northbound US 222 and PA 272 head northeast onto Oregon Pike, with PA 272 becoming signed again, while southbound US 222 and PA 501 continue north along Lititz Pike. The two routes continue northeast as a three-lane road with a center left-turn lane and runs past businesses and a few homes before it comes to an interchange with the US 30 freeway. Here, US 222 splits from PA 272, which becomes signed again, by heading east concurrent with US 30 on an eight-lane freeway, passing near developed areas. US 222 splits from US 30 at a trumpet interchange and heads north onto a four-lane freeway. The route curves northeast and runs through a mix of farmland and residential and commercial development. The freeway comes to a northbound exit and entrance with Butter Road, which provides access to PA 272 via Jake Landis Road, and a southbound exit and entrance with PA 272. Past this interchange, US 222 continues through a mix of farm fields and woodland, passing through a corner of Warwick Township before crossing the Cocalico Creek into West Earl Township.

The route passes near farmland before heading near homes and businesses, reaching a partial cloverleaf interchange with PA 772 north of Brownstown. Past here, the freeway runs northeast through agricultural areas. Farther along, US 222 curves to the north and comes to a diverging diamond interchange with US 322 southeast of the borough of Ephrata, at which point it crosses into Ephrata Township. The route passes near businesses at the interchange before it turns northeast and runs through wooded areas with some nearby residential development and farm fields. The freeway heads into East Cocalico Township and runs through more woodland before it passes to the southeast of Reamstown. US 222 passes through farmland and comes to a diamond interchange with Colonel Howard Boulevard, which heads west to provide access to PA 272 and east to provide access to the Pennsylvania Turnpike (I-76) at the Reading interchange. Following this, the route passes over the Pennsylvania Turnpike and crosses into Brecknock Township, running through a mix of farm fields and woods with some nearby residential and commercial development as it runs to the southeast of the borough of Adamstown.

The US 222 freeway enters Brecknock Township in Berks County and continues north, passing a northbound weigh station before coming to a partial cloverleaf interchange serving the northern terminus of PA 272 and the western terminus of PA 568. Past this interchange, the route crosses into Spring Township and runs through wooded areas with some fields and homes, curving to the northeast and reaching a diamond interchange at Mohns Hill Road to the west of Gouglersville. Here, the freeway crosses into Cumru Township and runs north-northeast through more rural areas, coming to a diamond interchange that connects to Grings Hill Road west of the borough of Mohnton.

=== Reading to Allentown ===
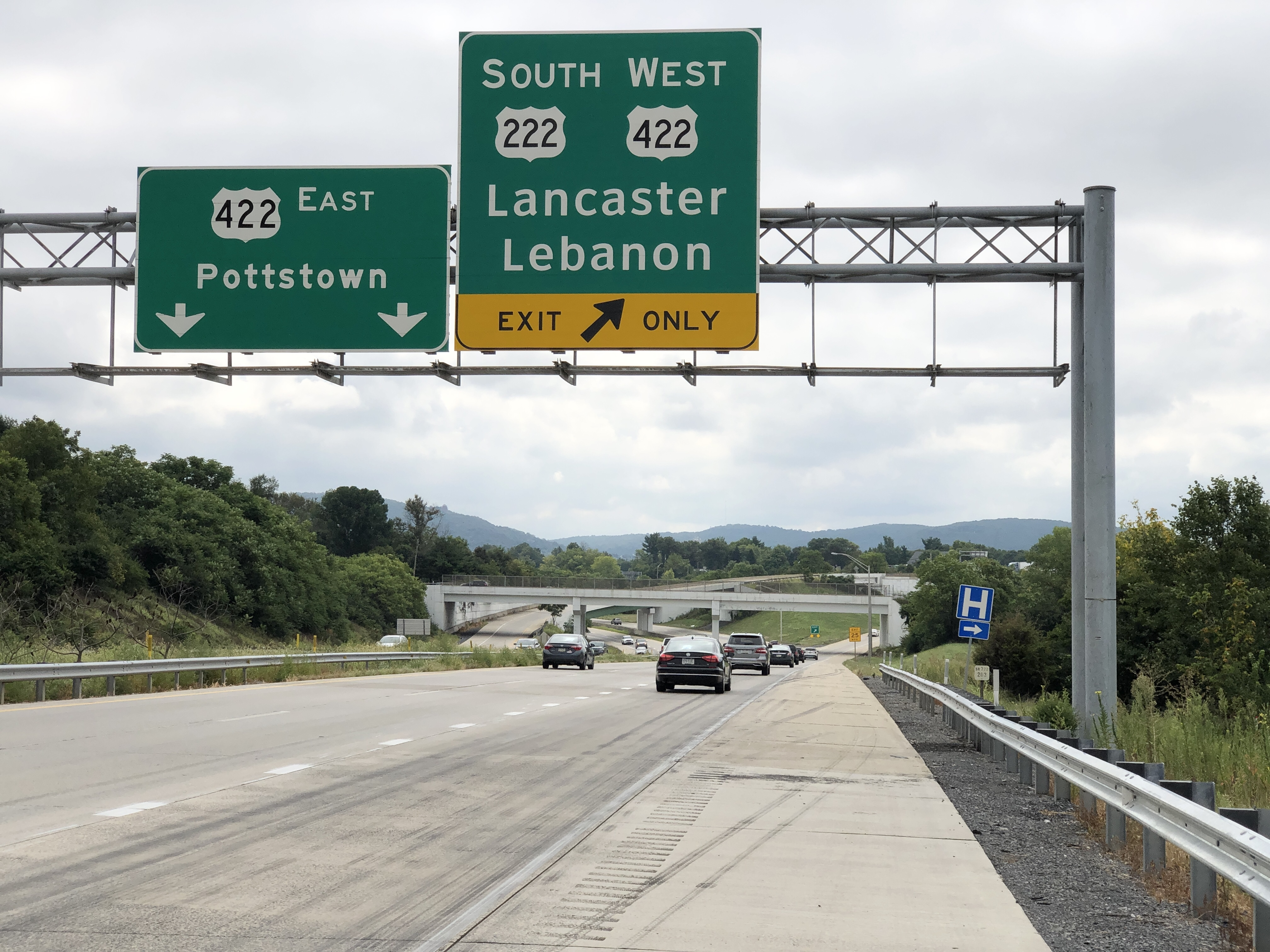
US 222 southbound at US 422 in Wyomissing

A short distance later, US 222 comes to a northbound exit and southbound entrance with the southern terminus of US 222 Bus., a business route that passes through the city of Reading, which US 222 bypasses to the west. From here, the route curves to the north and crosses back into Spring Township, passing near suburban residential development and coming to a partial cloverleaf interchange with PA 724 in a business area. The freeway turns to the northeast and passes through residential areas and some woodland between West Wyomissing to the north and Lincoln Park to the south. US 222 briefly forms the border between Spring Township to the north and the borough of Wyomissing to the south before it bends to the north-northeast into Spring Township. The route crosses into Wyomissing and comes to an interchange with US 422 and the western terminus of US 422 Bus., at which point it also passes over Norfolk Southern's Harrisburg Line. At this interchange, US 422 becomes concurrent with US 222, and the two routes continue east-northeast along the six-lane Warren Street Bypass freeway, running between residential areas to the northwest and the Norfolk Southern tracks to the southeast. The freeway curves north into business areas and comes to a partial cloverleaf interchange with State Hill Road. Following this, US 222/US 422 passes between the Berkshire Mall to the west and commercial areas to the east before it reaches an interchange with Paper Mill Road and Crossing Drive, where it curves to the northeast and runs near more businesses. The freeway comes to an interchange where US 222 splits to the northwest, US 422 immediately afterward splits southeast along the West Shore Bypass, and, straight ahead, PA 12 begins northeast along the Warren Street Bypass.

Past this interchange, US 222 heads northwest as a four-lane freeway, crossing back into Spring Township and running between a farm field to the southwest and the Penn State Berks university campus to the northeast before reaching a diamond interchange with Broadcasting Road. The route between US 422 and the northern end of this expressway portion is known as the Outer Bypass, the POW/MIA Memorial Highway by an act of the Pennsylvania General Assembly, or the "Road to Nowhere" as it was known while incomplete and to this day. The route runs between a shopping center to the southwest and Tulpehocken Valley County Park to the northeast prior to reaching the Spring Ridge Drive exit. At this point, the freeway turns north and crosses the Tulpehocken Creek into Bern Township and runs north-northeast through wooded areas with some nearby homes and commercial development, coming to a partial cloverleaf interchange with PA 183. Following this, US 222 curves northeast, passing to the northwest of Reading Regional Airport and running through farm fields before crossing the Schuylkill River into Muhlenberg Township. The route passes near residential neighborhoods and some commercial development, passing over the Reading Blue Mountain and Northern Railroad's Reading Division line and reaching a partial cloverleaf interchange with PA 61. The freeway passes under another Reading Blue Mountain and Northern Railroad line and Norfolk Southern's Evansville Industrial Track railroad line, crossing into Ontelaunee Township. At this point, US 222 heads northeast through industrial areas, with Norfolk Southern's Reading Line parallel to the southeast. The freeway comes to an end at a trumpet interchange, where US 222 intersects the northern terminus of US 222 Bus. and merges onto that road.

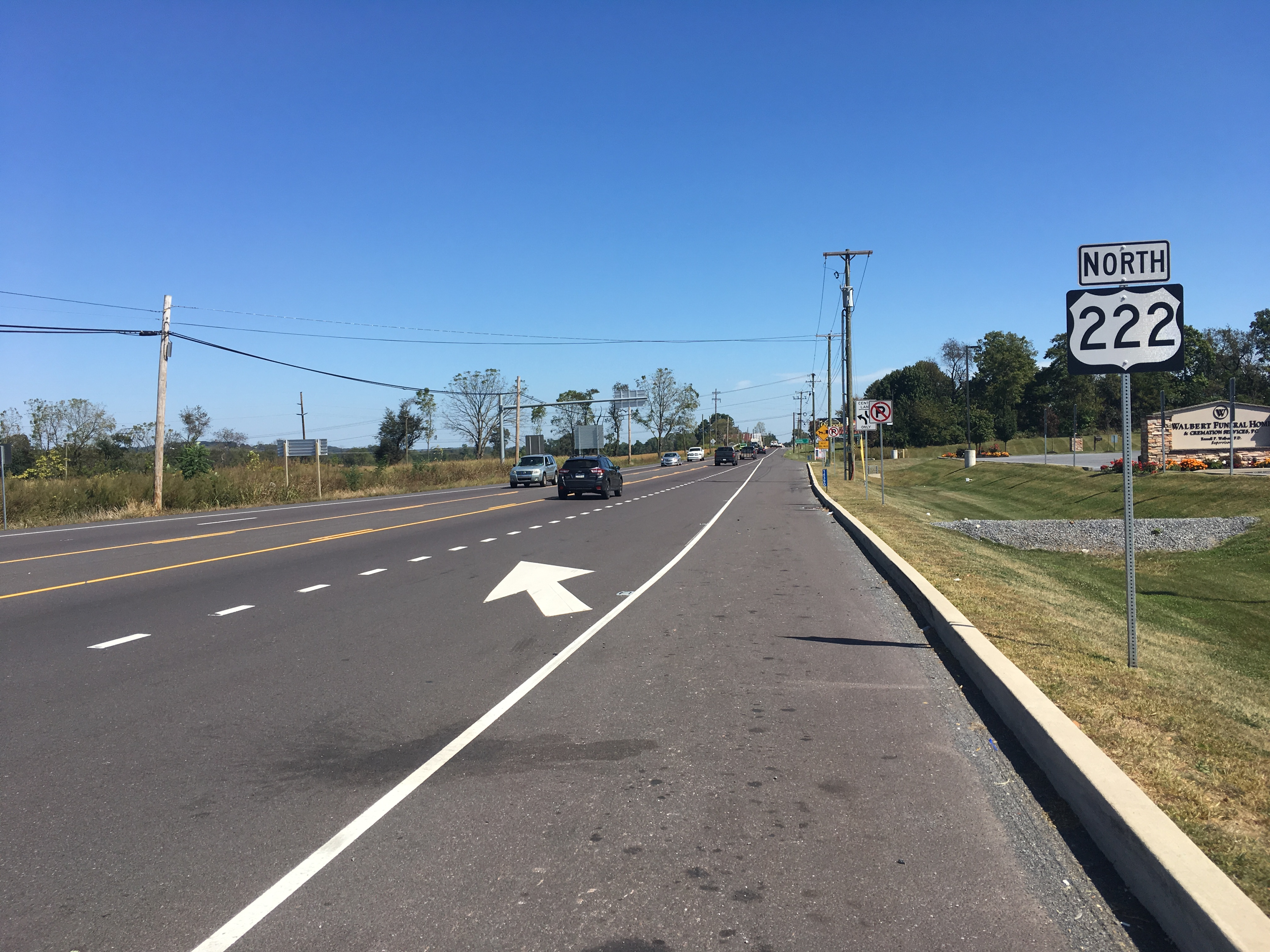
US 222 northbound past PA 662 in Moselem Springs

From here, US 222 heads north-northeast on four-lane divided Allentown Pike past a few businesses. The route enters Maidencreek Township and becomes a five-lane road with a center left-turn lane, running through a mix of fields and woods with some homes. The road curves northeast and passes commercial development, coming to an intersection with PA 73 in Maiden Creek. Past this intersection, US 222 runs past a mix of residential development and businesses with some farm fields, meeting Tamarack Boulevard/Genesis Drive and Schaeffer Road at a roundabout. At this point, the route narrows to three lanes with a center left-turn lane and heads into the agricultural East Penn Valley in northeastern Berks County, which is home to an Old Order Mennonite community. US 222 continues northeast through farmland with some trees, residences, and businesses, passing through Kirbyville and crossing into Richmond Township, where the name becomes Kutztown Road. Farther northeast, the road heads past businesses and comes to a roundabout with PA 662 in Moselem Springs. US 222 continues through farmland with some development, passing to the southeast of a golf course in Kempville.

The route becomes a four-lane freeway called the Kutztown Bypass, which bypasses the borough of Kutztown to the northwest, with a northbound exit and southbound entrance at Kutztown Road providing access to Kutztown. The freeway heads northeast through agricultural areas and crosses into Maxatawny Township, where it comes to a southbound exit and northbound entrance at Crystal Cave Road that provides access to Crystal Cave and Virginville. From here, the route heads through more rural land before it passes through a section of Kutztown and runs near residential areas and farmland north of the Kutztown University of Pennsylvania campus. US 222 crosses back into Maxatawny Township and curves east, passing over the Sacony Creek and coming to a partial cloverleaf interchange with the southern terminus of PA 737 that provides access to Kutztown. The freeway crosses back into Kutztown and passes near homes before it reenters Maxatawny Township and the Kutztown Bypass ends at a southbound exit and northbound entrance with Kutztown Road that serves the borough. From here, US 222 becomes two-lane undivided Kutztown Road and runs east-northeast through farmland before heading past businesses near the Long Lane intersection. The route gains a center left-turn lane and passes through Monterey before it continues through agricultural areas. Farther east, the road heads into Maxatawny, where it is lined with homes and a few businesses.

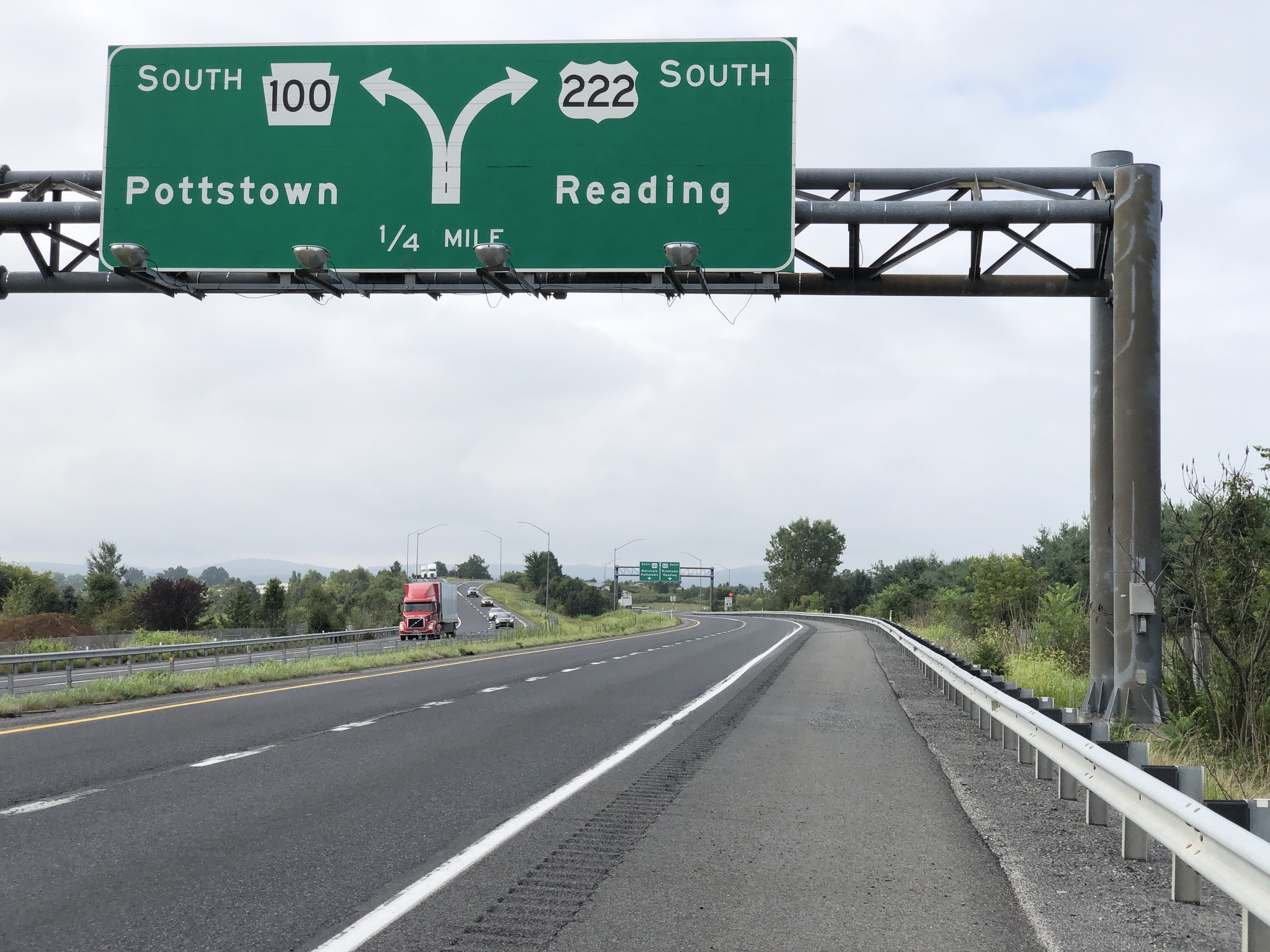
US 222 southbound at split with PA 100 in Trexlertown

US 222 enters Upper Macungie Township in Lehigh County, which is in the Lehigh Valley, and becomes Hamilton Boulevard, a five-lane road with a center left-turn lane that passes through farmland with some businesses and comes to a roundabout with the southern terminus of PA 863, Schantz Road, and Farmington Road. The route narrows to three lanes with a center left-turn lane and continues east through farm fields with some homes and businesses, heading to the south of an office park. Residential and commercial development along the road increases as it passes to the north of Breinigsville. A bit further east, US 222 diverges from Hamilton Boulevard at a northbound exit and southbound entrance onto a four-lane divided expressway called the Frederick J. Jaindl Jr. Memorial Highway, immediately reaching a partial interchange with the PA 100 bypass of Trexlertown, where Hamilton Boulevard continues east into Trexlertown, northbound US 222 merges with northbound PA 100, and southbound US 222 splits from southbound PA 100. All other connections between PA 100 and US 222 are provided by Hamilton Boulevard and Weilers Road. US 222 and PA 100 continue north concurrent along the expressway, passing near homes and intersecting Grim Road/Cetronia Road at-grade. The road curves northeast and runs between warehouses to the northwest and housing developments to the southeast. PA 100 splits from US 222 at a diamond interchange, at which point PA 100 continues north and Trexlertown Road heads south. US 222 continues past industrial areas and farmland, coming to a bridge over Norfolk Southern's C&F Secondary. The route bends east and runs past more farmland before heading near residential neighborhoods, crossing over Cetronia Road on a bridge before intersecting Grange Road/Mill Creek Road at-grade.

US 222 crosses into Lower Macungie Township and curves to the east-northeast, passing north of a shopping center and intersecting North Krocks Road at an at-grade intersection with a northbound exit and entrance ramp for right turns and access to and from the shopping center. Past this, the route has a southbound exit to Brookside Road north of Wescosville. The road comes to a bridge over the Pennsylvania Turnpike Northeast Extension (I-476) and runs between industrial development to the north and businesses to the south, reaching an intersection with Hamilton Boulevard and Cedarbrook Road/Kressler Road. Here, US 222 widens to six lanes and becomes Hamilton Boulevard again, heading east-northeast to the north of a park and ride lot before it comes to its northern terminus at a partial cloverleaf interchange with I-78/PA 309 in Dorneyville. Past this interchange, Hamilton Boulevard continues as PA 222 toward the city of Allentown.

== History ==
The first stretch of highway between Perryville and Conowingo in Maryland that became part of US 222 to be improved was in Perryville, where Cecil County constructed with state aid a macadam road from the Aikin station on the Baltimore and Ohio Railroad south toward the Post Road, which is present-day MD 7, by 1910. Cecil County extended the macadam road to the Post Road by 1919. The highway from the Aikin railroad crossing to Port Deposit was paved as a 15-foot-long (4.6 m) concrete road in two sections: from the railroad to near Port Deposit by 1921 and through Port Deposit by 1923. The section of Rock Springs Road between present-day US 1 and Old Conowingo Road/Ragan Road was constructed by the state of Maryland as a macadam road by 1921.

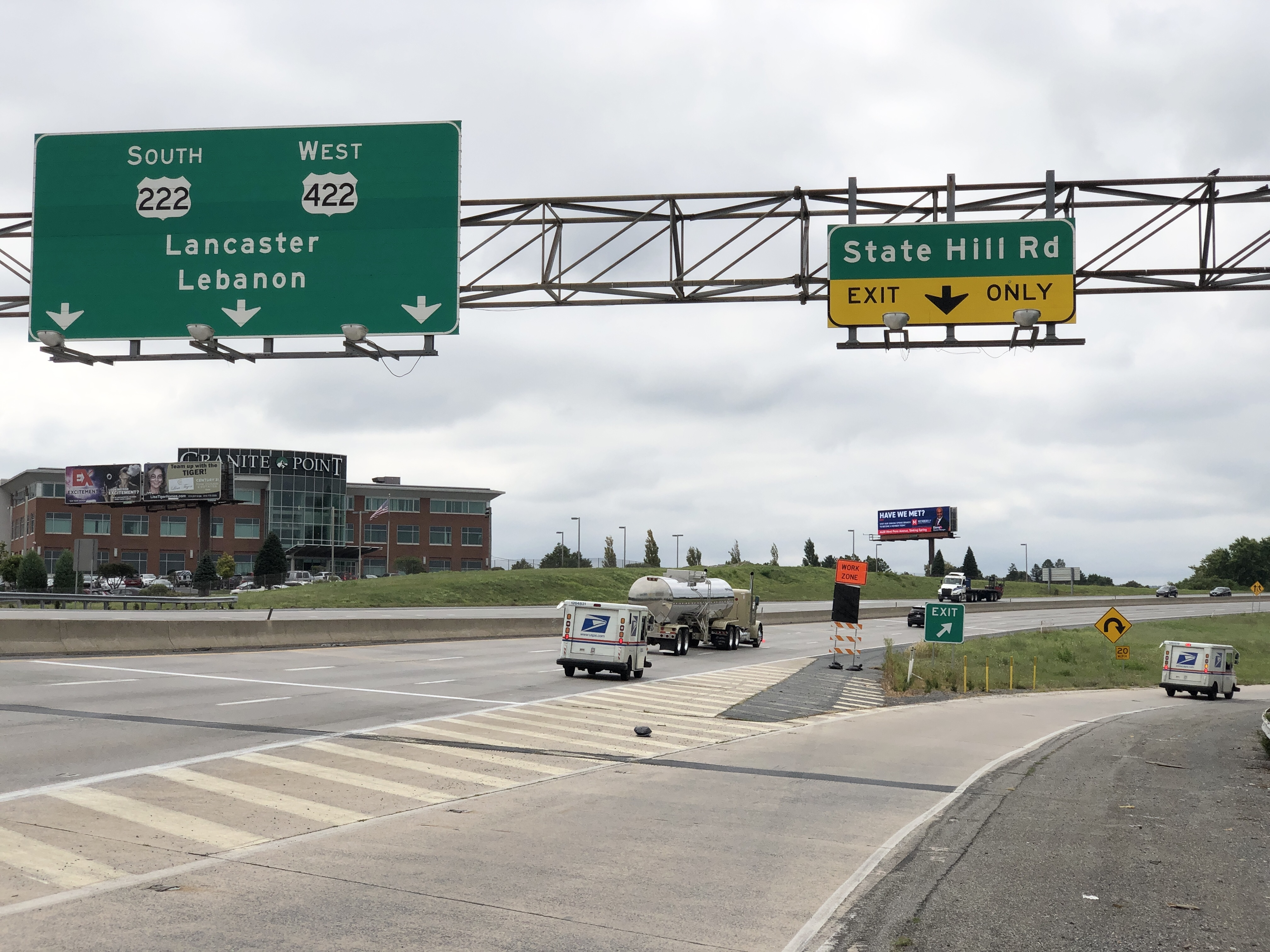
US 222 southbound/US 422 westbound at State Hill Road exit in Wyomissing

US 222 was first designated 1926, it traveled from Lancaster to Reading.

In 1927, the designation was extended south from Lancaster to Conowingo to replace US 230. A concurrency with PA 41 was also created between Lancaster and Reading and PA 42 through downtown Reading.

The portion of US 222 between Old Conowingo Road/Ragan Road and the Pennsylvania border was built by the state as a concrete road in 1928. In addition, the concurrent PA 41 designation between Lancaster and Reading was replaced with PA 240, and a PA 73 concurrency was created with US 222/PA 240 between New Holland Avenue, where it split south, and downtown Reading.

The road was extended south to US 1 in Conowingo from 1929 to 1930. The PA 240 designation was also removed, and road realigned though and near Reading.

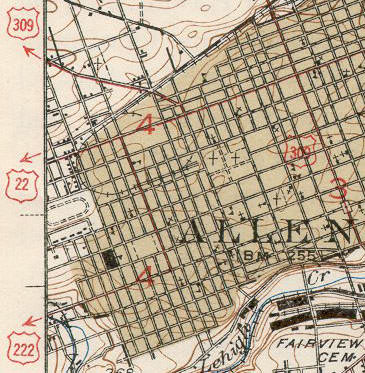
1939 USGS Allentown map, showing US 222 along the current alignment of PA 222

By 1930, the portion of US 22 in Lebanon became problematic for motorists along the current US 422; Reading via US 22 and US 222; and Allentown on Hamilton Street (US 22). PA 43 had been aligned as a bypass between Allentown and Harrisburg. On June 8, 1931, the American Association of State Highway Officials came to a resolution to the traffic problem, by replacing the PA 43 corridor with US 22 and the William Penn Highway name to match. The state truncated PA 43 to Susquehanna Street from Allentown to Bethlehem. US 222 replaced the former US 22 alignment from Reading to Allentown. Hamilton Street was numbered as US 222, west of Center City Allentown, where it turned north onto 15th Street. This portion of US 222 was seven blocks long, ending at Tilghman Street, which was then US Route 22. Signs were changed to reflect the new designations on May 31, 1932, with the new route designations officially in place on June 1, 1932.

The portion from Port Deposit to US 1 at Conowingo Dam was paved in 1933; the construction work included rebuilding a railroad bridge across Octoraro Creek into a highway bridge.

The bridge over the Baltimore and Ohio Railroad was constructed in 1934, replacing an at-grade crossing. The old highway approaching the Aikin grade crossing became MD 449.

In 1936, US 222 was extended north to Brownstown.

The MD 268 concurrency was removed from the portion between US 1 at Conowingo to US 40 (now MD 7) in Perryville in 1937.

In 1938, the route was widened to four lanes from Maiden Creek to Trexlertown as well as from Wescoesville to Allentown.

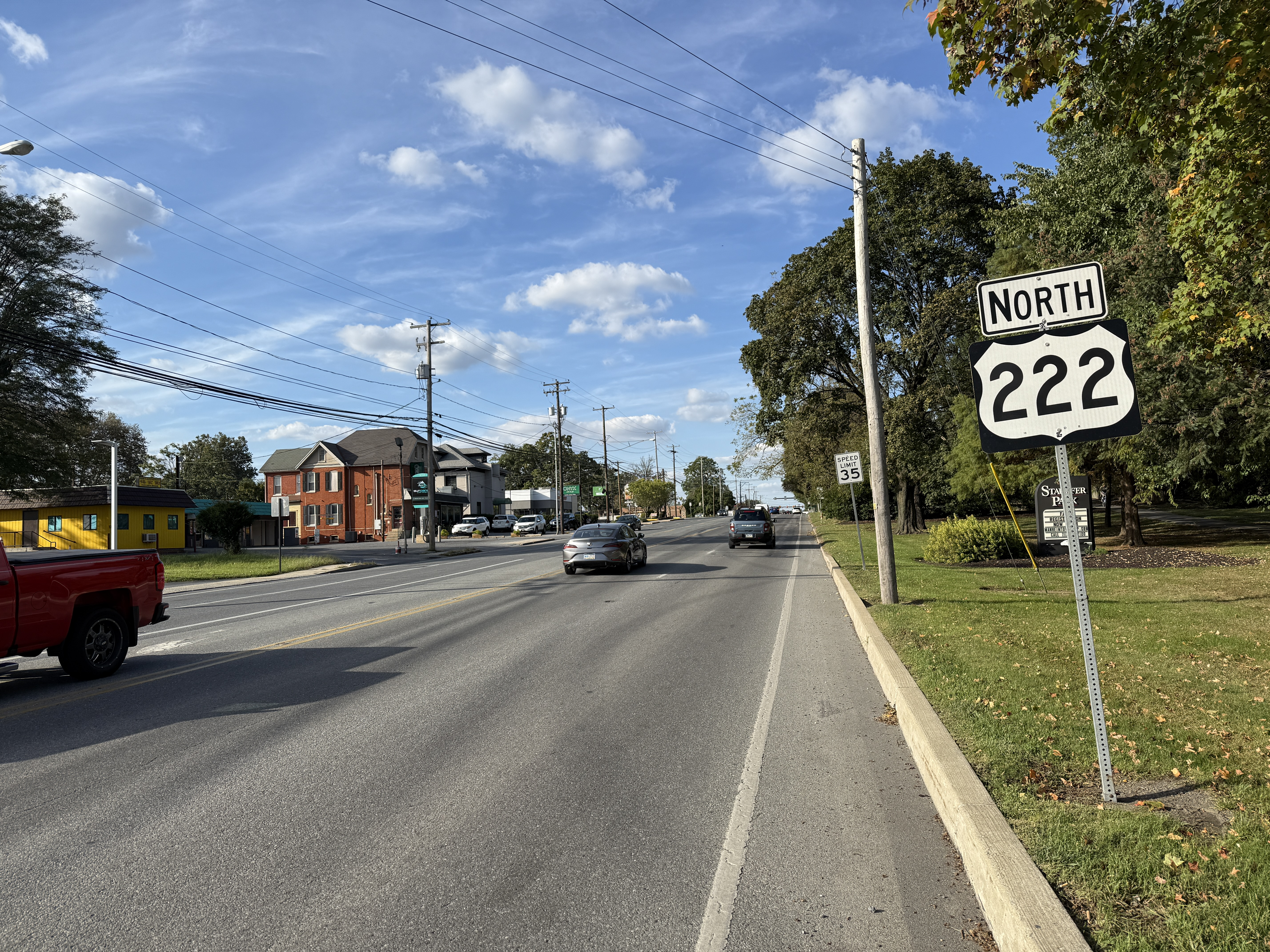
US 222/PA 272 northbound in Manheim Township

In 1940, a widening to four lanes took place from Lancaster to PA 501, in Adamstown, and Reading to North Temple Boulevard. Additionally, the road was shifted to follow 5th Street north through Reading and the 5th Street Highway through Muhlenberg Township, US 122 and PA 722 replaced the PA 42 concurrency south of Reading and the US 120 concurrency north of it, and new concurrences with PA 324, PA 324, and PA 501 was created.

In 1941, the road was widened from Shillington to Reading.

In 1942, the road was rebuilt in Maryland.

The road was proposed to be widened to 20 feet (6.1 m) from US 40 to US 1 as early as 1934. However this construction did not occur until 1944. The work was done in order to improve access to United States Naval Training Center Bainbridge.

In 1945, a realignment in Ephrata opened. The new alignment included a new cloverleaf interchange with US 322.

A widening project took place from North Temple Boulevard to Maiden Creek, as well as from Trexlertown to Wescoesville. Both of these were competed in 1946.

In 1950, an intersection with the Pennsylvania Turnpike opened and part of the road was mildly realigned.

In 1953, a cloverleaf interchange was built with the freeway bypass of US 230.

With the construction of the Lehigh Valley Thruway in 1954 and the relocation of US 22 to that route, US 222 was extended. The route was also widened between Gouglersville and Shillington.

Work on a project to truncate US 222 was competed by 1956. From the south, US 222 left Hamilton Boulevard and turned north onto the freeway. US 222 terminated at an interchange with US 22, US 309, and PA 29 in South Whitehall Township.

In 1958, the road was signed on the original route and northbound on Conestoga Street and Queen Street and a median was installed from Reading to Elizabeth Avenue. Additionally, the Susquehanna River Road section was transferred from state to county maintenance through a road transfer agreement.

In 1949, plans were made to build a four-lane bridge across Tulpehocken Creek at Warren Street. As part of this plan, Warren Street was to be widened from the proposed bridge to Schuylkill Avenue. This widened Warren Street was envisioned to become part of a bypass route of Reading for US 222. The bridge and widening were approved with the provision that Warren Street only be widened as far as Schuylkill Avenue as not to build a bypass route through a residential area. Construction on the bridge and the Warren Street Bypass between US 422 (Harrisburg Pike, now Penn Avenue) and PA 83 (now PA 183, Schuylkill Avenue) began in 1950. In 1953, the Park Avenue Extension (which extended Park Avenue in Wyomissing to the bypass) and the Warren Street Bypass from US 422 in Wyomissing to Tulpehocken Creek, along with the Tulpehocken Creek bridge, was finished, with a continuation of the Warren Street Bypass northeast from PA 83 to US 222 (Allentown Pike, now 5th Street Highway) proposed. Construction on the rest of the Warren Street Bypass began in 1956 with the process of widening of the existing Warren Street. The PA 83 bridge over the bypass was built in 1957. In 1959, the Warren Street Bypass extension to US 222 was opened to traffic with the portion of Warren Street between Tulpehocken Creek and PA 83 widened to four lanes. The Warren Street Bypass included an interchange with the under-construction Reading Bypass (now US 422, West Shore Bypass) southwest of Tulpehocken Creek when it opened.

In 1960, the concurrency with PA 501 was eliminated.

In 1961, a median was installed in Ephrata. Northbound traffic also shifted to Laurel Street and Fifth Street in Reading, while The original routing became southbound only, the Susquehanna River Road portion was also restored to state level maintenance.

In 1962, the US 122 concurrency was removed from US 222 in Reading as part of the elimination of US 122. In addition, the southbound road was relocated onto McGovern Avenue and in Reading northbound traffic was moved again to follow Bingaman Street and Fifth Street while southbound was realigned off Fifth Street to follow Chestnut Street and Fourth Street.

The road in Maryland was widened between what is now the MD 222–MD 275—MD 824 intersection and Port Deposit from 1959 to 1962. The road also mildy realigned when a new diamond interchange with I-95 was built the following year. The old alignment of US 222 east of its I-95 interchange became Maryland Route 824.

The bypass of Allentown, originally concurrent with PA 29, had this designation removed in 1966. Additionally, the PA 73 concurrency were removed from the portion in Lancaster.

In 1968, the road was truncated to end at the cloverleaf Interchange with PA 309.

The highway was resurfaced with bituminous concrete from MD 7 to US 40 and reconstructed with wider lanes from US 40 to the southern MD 824 intersection in 1969. The work included rebuilding the bridge across the Baltimore and Ohio Railroad.

In 1970, the road was widened to four lanes and a median barrier installed from PA 741 to Locust Lane.

In 1972, the southern terminus was truncated to US 40 in Perryville, with MD 222 replacing the route along Aiken Avenue between MD 7 and US 40.

In 1970, construction began on a freeway bypass around Kutztown. The new alignment was opened to traffic on May 25, 1973, with a ribbon-cutting ceremony held.

In 1973, construction began on a project to widen the Warren Street Bypass to six lanes. This included replacement of overpasses and underpasses. Work on the project was completed in 1976.

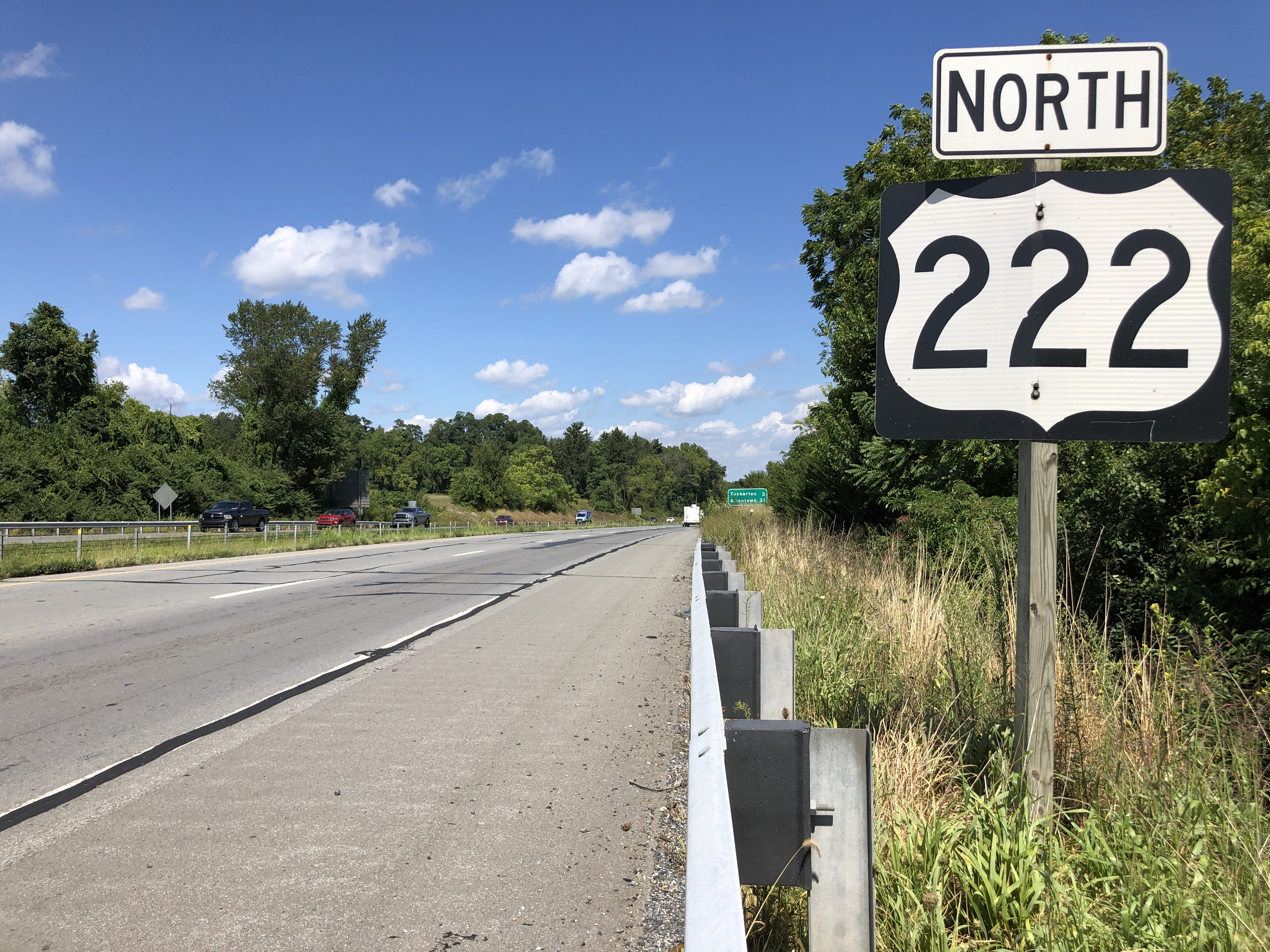
US 222 northbound past the PA 183 interchange in Bern Township

Studies for a limited-access highway connecting Lancaster and Reading began in the early 1950s. In 1962, construction began on a four-lane highway between Spring Township and Bern Township that would eventually connect to US 222. After construction stopped, this stretch became known as "The Road to Nowhere." In 1973, the federal government approved the relocation of homes and businesses along the path of the proposed US 222 freeway between Lancaster and Reading. On November 15, 1975, the American Association of State Highway and Transportation Officials (AASHTO) approved for this. In July 1977, the final section of the US 222 freeway between Lancaster and the Berks County border opened to traffic. PA 272 was given a concurrency with the road.

In 1984, the Pennsylvania Department of Transportation (PennDOT) announced plans to extend the road to PA 145 in Allentown. Traffic engineer Samuel D. Darrohh said that Allentown is one of few Pennsylvania cities without a traffic route going through it. After the plan was introduced, he said that motorists might be aided if US 222 were extended along Hamilton Boulevard to connect with the proposed PA 145 corridor. PennDOT originally planned the road as US 222 but AASHTO denied the extension, stating that the route "is not the shortest or best available route between major control points on the system, and therefore, does not adhere to the policies established under AASHTO's 'Purpose and Policy Statement for U.S. Numbered Highways'". In addition, the route did not meet the criteria for a business route.

The bridge over the Baltimore and Ohio railroad was reconstructed from 1987 to 1989.

In 1980, I-78 became part of the freeway that occupied PA 309. With this, the interchange with I-78 and PA 309 was rebuilt from a cloverleaf interchange into a partial cloverleaf interchange and partial diamond interchange from 1989 to 1990.

The I-95 interchange was rebuilt from a diamond interchange to a four-ramp partial cloverleaf interchange in 1994.

AASHTO approved truncating the southern terminus from US 40 in Perryville to US 1 in Conowingo at their April 1995 spring meeting. The Maryland State Highway Administration proposed and AASHTO approved the redesignation of US 222 to MD 222 from US 40 in Perryville to US 1 in Conowingo in February 1996; however, this had already been enacted officially and marked publicly in 1995.

In 1995, construction began on the Park Road Corridor to connect US 222/US 422 at the junction of the West Shore Bypass and Warren Street Bypass to the Road to Nowhere. Construction of the Park Road Corridor was completed in October 1998. As a result, US 222 was shifted to follow the Park Road Corridor and the Road to Nowhere to bypass the Reading area, replacing SR 3055 along the Road to Nowhere. The former alignment of US 222 that was bypassed became PA 12 along the Warren Street Bypass between US 222/US 422 and US 222 Bus. and a northern extension of US 222 Bus. along 5th Street Highway and Allentown Pike through Muhlenberg Township.

From 1997 to 2004, reconstruction of the US 30 interchange onto and from the at-grade section in Lancaster from a cloverleaf interchange into a collector distributor roadway was undertaken. The road subsequently rerouted onto the newly created Chester Road and York Road.

On January 29, 2005, the service road at the PA 272 and the Pennsylvania Turnpike interchange was officially named Colonel Howard Boulevard.

In 1998, construction began on a US 222 freeway bypass of Reading. The first portion opened between PA 724 and US 422 in 2000. In 2004, construction was completed on the section of the US 222 freeway between Grings Hill Road and PA 724. As a result, US 222 was shifted to follow the new freeway between Grings Hill Road and US 422 and run concurrent with US 422 on the Warren Street Bypass north to the interchange with the West Shore Bypass and PA 12. The former alignment of US 222 along Lancaster Avenue became a southern extension of US 222 Bus. In June 2006, the US 222 freeway was completed between the Lancaster County border and Grings Hill Road. This completed the project.

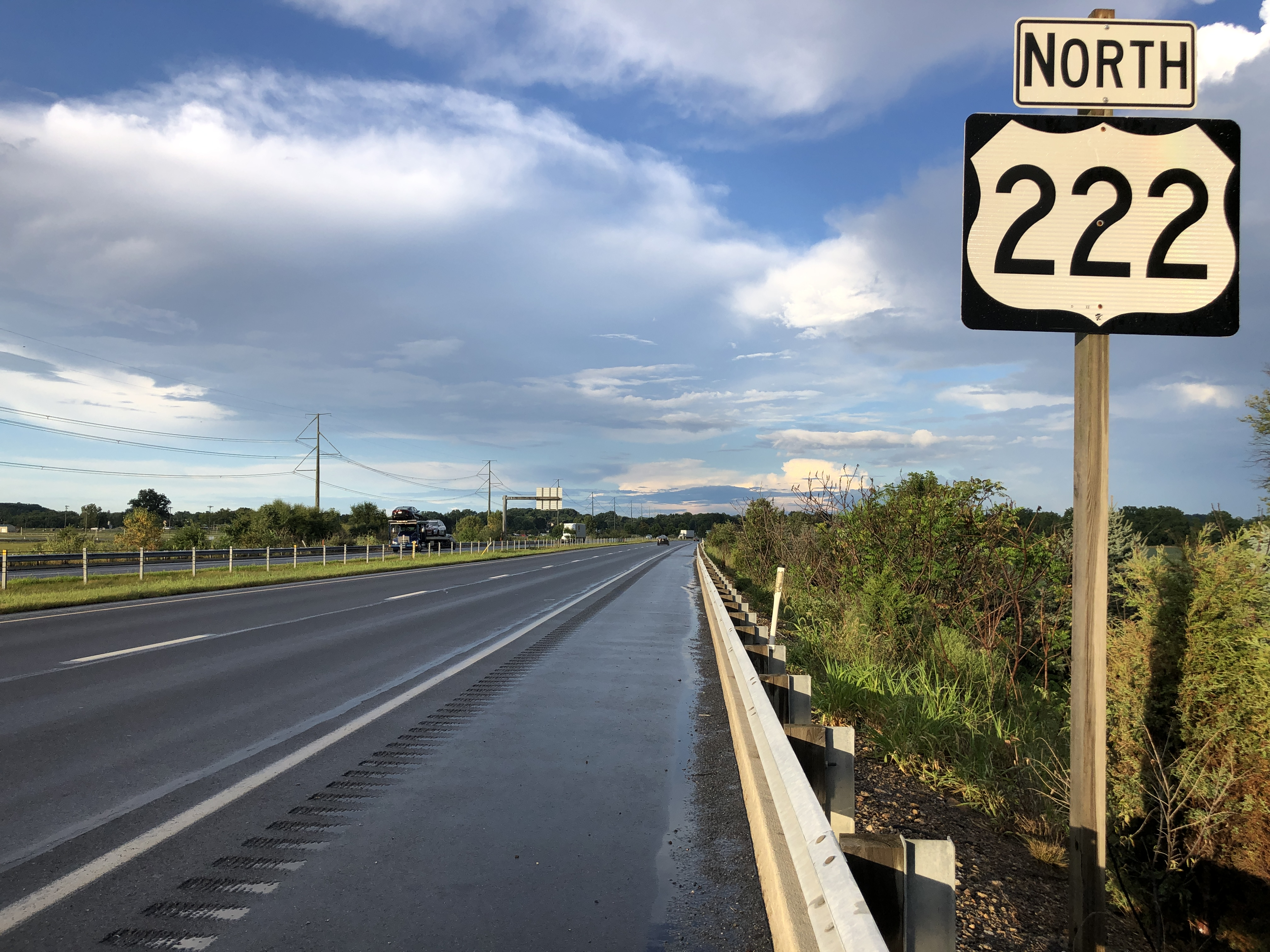
US 222 northbound past PA 100 in Trexlertown

In 2002, construction began on a bypass route for US 222 and PA 100 around Trexlertown. On September 29, 2005, PA 100 was rerouted to bypass Trexlertown to the west along the four-lane divided Trexlertown Bypass. US 222 was moved onto the bypass on September 28, 2007, following the completion of the bypass. The construction cost $144 million. The former alignment of US 222 through Trexlertown along Hamilton Boulevard was designated SR 6222. The new road was officially named the Fred Jaindl Memorial Highway, in honor of Fred Jaindl.

In 2008, construction was competed on a new northbound ramp connecting to Paper Mill Road, replacing the ramp onto Spring Ridge Drive.

In 2011, a new northbound ramp was opened connecting to Park Drive at the Interchange with Business Route 222 in Reading.

On July 5, 2012, a portion of the southbound roadbed near the Berks County line had to close due to an 8-inch buckle in the road surface caused by the hot weather. Repairs were completed the next day.

The PA 183 and PA 51 interchanges were both reconstructed starting in 2010. This project saw ramps and the overpass rebuilt, and left turn ramps reach ed by right turn ramps and existing ramps midyied to remove said connections. New previously nonexistent connections were also added. Initially set for completion in August 2012, it was not completed until early 2013.

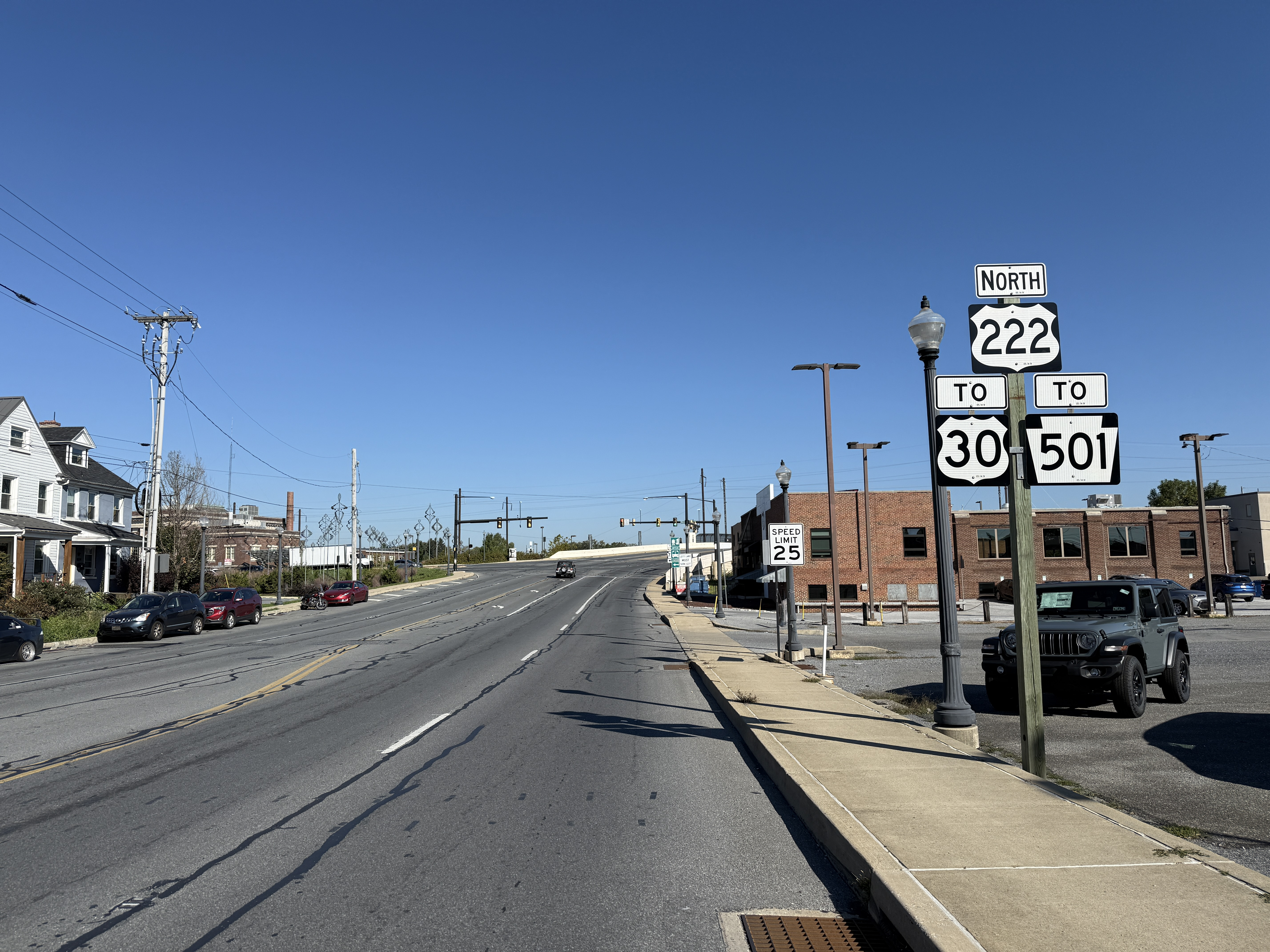
US 222/PA 272 northbound leaving Lancaster

In March 2013, construction began on a new bridge to carry the road over the Amtrak tracks in Lancaster. The bridge project cost $26.6 million, with $12.7 million of that figure the actual construction costs of the bridge. The new bridge, which is four lanes wide and connects Lititz Pike directly with North Duke Street, opened to traffic on July 9, 2014, with the old bridge demolished. The bridge was named the Thaddeus Stevens Bridge in honor of Thaddeus Stevens, a 19th-century abolitionist and United States Representative who was from Lancaster. Concurrent with the construction of the new bridge, McGovern Avenue was converted to a two-way road between North Queen Street and North Duke Street to provide improved access to Lancaster station.

A roundabout was planned to replace the intersection with PA 662 in Richmond Township in order to reduce traffic congestion. The project, which cost $6.6 million, replaced the signalized intersection between the two routes with a roundabout, with US 222 widened to four lanes at the roundabout. Construction of the roundabout began on September 6, 2016. The roundabout opened a few lanes to traffic on May 22, 2018, with the rest opened on July 20.

In 2010, officials in Berks County pushed for PennDOT to widen a portion of the two-lane road to four lanes due to traffic and safety issues. In June 2018, plans to widen a portion of US 222 in Maidencreek Township near the PA 73 intersection to five lanes with a center left-turn lane received approval from township supervisors. The widening project was completed in 2020.

In 2019, construction began to convert the interchange with US 322 near Ephrata into a diverging diamond. The work, which cost $10.9 million and received federal funding, opened on May 17, 2021, one year ahead of schedule. No overpasses needed to be replaced.

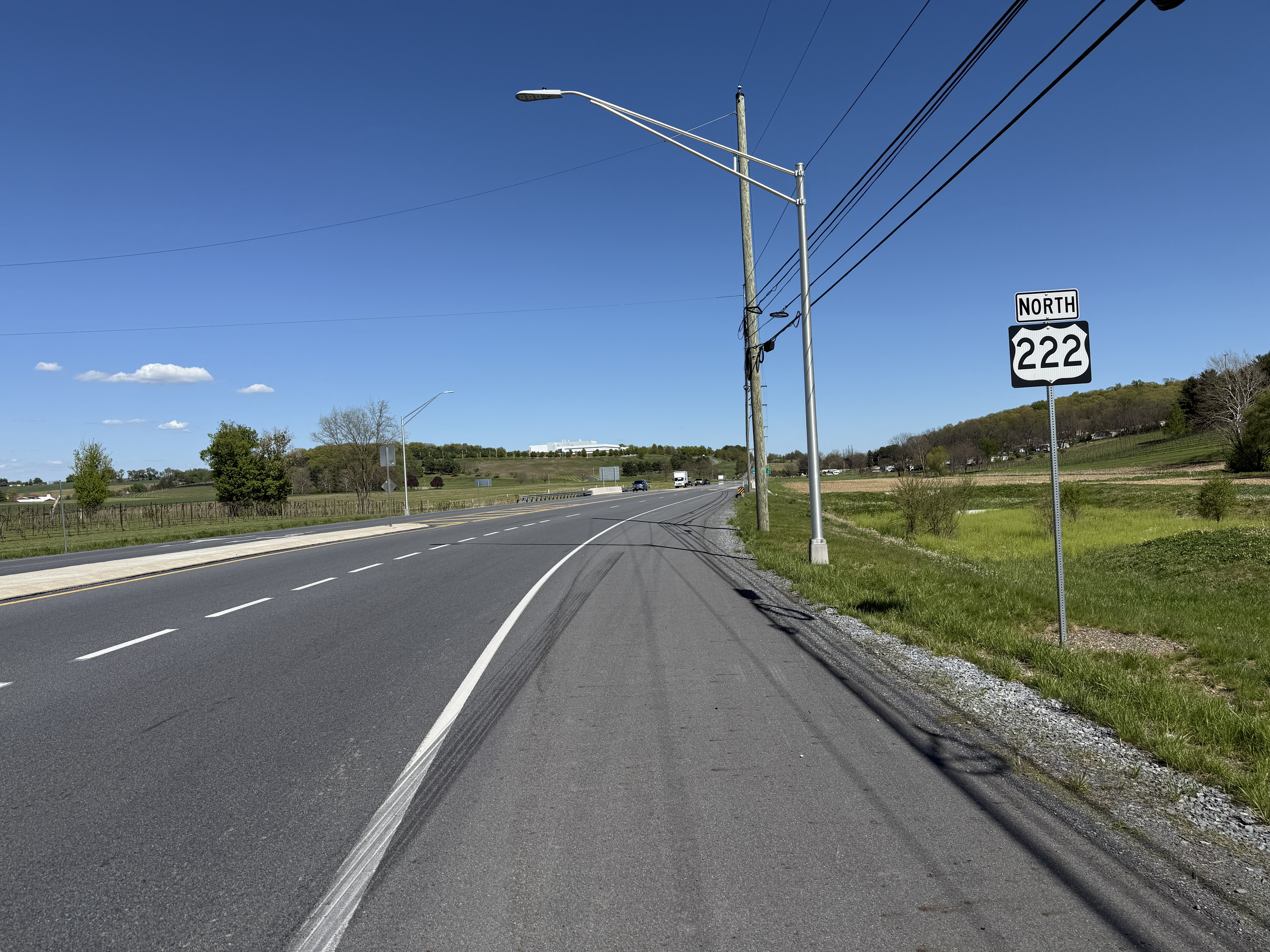
US 222 northbound past PA 863 in Upper Macungie Township

On September 9, 2019, construction began on a $26 million project to widen the road at the PA 73 intersection along with adding roundabouts at Genesis Drive and Schaeffer Road. The roundabout at Schaeffer Road opened in December 2021. The construction project widening US 222 in Maidencreek Township and adding two roundabouts was completed in June 2022.

Work began in April 2022 to reconstruct the road between Reading Boulevard and Paper Mill Road. It was completed that November.

A portion of the road in Lancaster county was renamed in September 2024 as the Senator Noah W. Wenger Memorial Highway.

The US 30 interchange is being reconstructed as part of a project. This will include widening the stretch north to six lanes, as well as lowering the roadbed near bridges and replacing some of them to increase clearances. It is expected to be completed on September 3, 2027.

In 2021, preliminary design began on a project to widen US 222 between Maidencreek Township and the southern end of the Kutztown Bypass to a four-lane road with a median barrier preventing left turns and cross traffic. Along this stretch, roundabouts will be constructed at Pleasant Hill Road and Richmond Road. Construction contracts are planned to be awarded in 2024 with completion expected in 2026. In 2022, construction will begin on a roundabout at Long Lane in Maxatawny Township. Preliminary engineering to widen US 222 between the northern end of the Kutztown Bypass and the Lehigh County line is not expected to take place until the late 2020s.

There are plans to construct a roundabout at the intersection with Schantz Road in Upper Macungie Township.

== Major intersections ==
State	County	Location	mi	km	Destinations	Notes
Maryland	Cecil	Conowingo	0.00	0.00	US 1 to MD 222 south / I-95	Southern terminus
Mason–Dixon line			3.61 0.000	5.81 0.000	Maryland–Pennsylvania state line	
Pennsylvania	Lancaster	Fulton Township	4.054	6.524	PA 272 south	South end of PA 272 overlap
Pennsylvania	Lancaster	Fulton Township	4.526	7.284	PA 272 north (Lancaster Pike) – Lancaster	North end of PA 272 overlap
Pennsylvania	Lancaster	Quarryville	13.709	22.062	PA 372 east to PA 472	South end of PA 372 overlap
Pennsylvania	Lancaster	Quarryville	14.162	22.792	PA 372 west (West State Street)	North end of PA 372 overlap
Pennsylvania	Lancaster	West Lampeter Township	22.807	36.704	PA 741 east (Village Road) – Lampeter, Strasburg	South end of PA 741 overlap
Pennsylvania	Lancaster	West Lampeter Township	24.180	38.914	PA 272 south (Long Lane) – Willow Street, Buck PA 741 west – New Danville	North end of PA 741 overlap; south end of PA 272 overlap; south end of unsigned section of PA 272
Pennsylvania	Lancaster	Lancaster Township–Lancaster line	26.991	43.438	PA 324 south	Southbound access only; northern terminus of PA 324
Pennsylvania	Lancaster	Lancaster	27.708	44.592	PA 72 north (South Queen Street)	Northbound access only; southern terminus of northbound PA 72
Pennsylvania	Lancaster	Lancaster	28.127	45.266	PA 462 east (East King Street)	
Pennsylvania	Lancaster	Lancaster	28.345	45.617	PA 23 east (East Chestnut Street)	
Pennsylvania	Lancaster	Lancaster	28.454	45.792	PA 23 west / PA 462 west (West Walnut Street)	
Pennsylvania	Lancaster	Lancaster–Manheim Township line	29.210	47.009	PA 72 north (North Prince Street) – Manheim, Lebanon	Southbound access only; southern terminus of southbound PA 72
Pennsylvania	Lancaster	Manheim Township	29.839	48.021	PA 501 north (Lititz Pike) – Lititz	South end of PA 501 overlap with southbound US 222; southern terminus of PA 501; north end of unsigned section of PA 272
Pennsylvania	Lancaster	Manheim Township	30.280	48.731	South end of freeway	
Pennsylvania	Lancaster	Manheim Township	30.280	48.731	PA 272 north (Oregon Pike) PA 501 north (Lititz Pike) – Lititz US 30 west / PA 283 west – York, Harrisburg	North end of PA 272 overlap; north end of PA 501 overlap with southbound US 222; south end of US 30 overlap
Pennsylvania	Lancaster	Manheim Township	30.920	49.761	US 30 east – Coatesville, Philadelphia	North end of US 30 overlap
Pennsylvania	Lancaster	Manheim Township	34.112	54.898	To PA 272 (Oregon Pike)	Access via Butter Road and Jake Landis Road northbound, PA 272 southbound
Pennsylvania	Lancaster	West Earl Township	36.849	59.303	PA 772 – Brownstown, Rothsville	
Pennsylvania	Lancaster	Ephrata Township	41.235	66.361	US 322 – Ephrata	Access to Historic Ephrata Cloister
Pennsylvania	Lancaster	East Cocalico Township	46.385	74.649	To I-76 / Penna Turnpike / PA 272 – Denver	Access via SR 1040 (Colonel Howard Boulevard); access to Reamstown and Adamstown
Pennsylvania	Berks	Brecknock Township	51.185	82.374	PA 272 south / PA 568 east – Adamstown, Knauers	Northern terminus of PA 272; western terminus of PA 568
Pennsylvania	Berks	Spring Township	53.120	85.488	Gouglersville	Access via Mohns Hill Road
Pennsylvania	Berks	Cumru Township	54.629	87.917	Mohnton	Access via Grings Hill Road
Pennsylvania	Berks	Cumru Township	55.065	88.619	US 222 Bus. north (Lancaster Avenue) – Shillington	Northbound exit and southbound entrance; southern terminus of US 222 Bus.
Pennsylvania	Berks	Spring Township	56.388	90.748	PA 724 – Sinking Spring, Shillington	Shillington not signed northbound
Pennsylvania	Berks	Wyomissing	57.813	93.041	US 422 west / US 422 Bus. east (Penn Avenue) – Lebanon	South end of US 422 overlap
Pennsylvania	Berks	Wyomissing	58.745	94.541	State Hill Road	
Pennsylvania	Berks	Wyomissing	59.232	95.325	Crossing Drive / Paper Mill Road	Crossing Drive not signed northbound; access to PA 12
Pennsylvania	Berks	Wyomissing	59.907	96.411	US 422 east – Pottstown PA 12 east – Pricetown	No southbound exit to eastbound PA 12 or northbound entrance from westbound PA 12; north end of US 422 overlap; western terminus of PA 12
Pennsylvania	Berks	Spring Township	61.090	98.315	Broadcasting Road	Access to Penn State University Berks Campus
Pennsylvania	Berks	Spring Township	61.775	99.417	Spring Ridge Drive	
Pennsylvania	Berks	Bern Township	63.157	101.641	PA 183 (Bernville Road) – Strausstown	Access to Reading Airport
Pennsylvania	Berks	Muhlenberg Township	66.369	106.811	PA 61 – Pottsville, Tuckerton	
Pennsylvania	Berks	Ontelaunee Township	68.266	109.863	US 222 Bus. south – Laureldale	Northern terminus of US 222 Bus.
Pennsylvania	Berks	Ontelaunee Township	68.266	109.863	North end of freeway	
Pennsylvania	Berks	Maidencreek Township	69.793	112.321	PA 73 – Leesport, Oley, Boyertown	
Pennsylvania	Berks	Richmond Township	73.896	118.924	PA 662 – Shoemakersville, Fleetwood	Roundabout
Pennsylvania	Berks	Richmond Township	75.508	121.518	South end of freeway	
Pennsylvania	Berks	Richmond Township	75.508	121.518	Virginville, Kutztown	Northbound exit and southbound entrance; access via Kutztown Road; access to Crystal Cave
Pennsylvania	Berks	Richmond–Maxatawny township line	76.437	123.013	Virginville	Southbound exit and northbound entrance; access via Crystal Cave Road; access to Crystal Cave
Pennsylvania	Berks	Kutztown–Maxatawny Township line	78.200	125.851	PA 737 north – Krumsville	Southern terminus of PA 737; access to Kutztown University of Pennsylvania
Pennsylvania	Berks	Maxatawny Township	79.717	128.292	Kutztown	Southbound exit and northbound entrance; access via Kutztown Road
Pennsylvania	Berks	Maxatawny Township	79.717	128.292	North end of freeway	
Pennsylvania	Lehigh	Upper Macungie Township	83.226	133.939	PA 863 north (Schantz Road) – New Smithville	Roundabout; southern terminus of PA 863
Pennsylvania	Lehigh	Upper Macungie Township	85.693	137.910	Hamilton Boulevard to PA 100 south – Trexlertown	Northbound exit and southbound entrance
Pennsylvania	Lehigh	Upper Macungie Township	86.073	138.521	PA 100 south – Macungie, Pottstown	Southbound exit and northbound entrance; south end of PA 100 overlap
Pennsylvania	Lehigh	Upper Macungie Township	87.454	140.744	PA 100 north – Fogelsville, Trexlertown	North end of PA 100 overlap
Pennsylvania	Lehigh	Lower Macungie Township	90.533	145.699	Brookside Road	Southbound exit only
Pennsylvania	Lehigh	Lower Macungie–South Whitehall township line	91.354	147.020	I-78 / PA 309 – Bethlehem, Quakertown, Harrisburg, Tamaqua PA 222 north (Hamilton Boulevard) – Allentown	I-78/PA 309 exit 54; northern terminus of US 222; southern terminus of PA 222
1.000 mi = 1.609 km; 1.000 km = 0.621 mi: Concurrency terminus; Incomplete access

== Special routes ==
=== Former Maryland truck route ===
U.S. Route 222 Truck
- Location: Perryville–Conowingo, Maryland
- Length: 12.49 mi (20.10 km)

U.S. Route 222 Truck was a 12.49-mile (20.10 km) truck bypass of US 222 from US 222 in Perryville to US 1 and US 222 in Conowingo. The signed route followed MD 275 from US 222 in Perryville north to MD 276 in Woodlawn. US 222 Truck continued north on MD 276 from Woodlawn north to US 1 west of Rising Sun. The truck route then headed west on US 1 to US 222 in Conowingo. US 222 Truck was downgraded to MD 222 Truck when US 222 became MD 222 between Perryville and Conowingo.

=== Reading business loop ===
U.S. Route 222 Business
- Location: Reading, Pennsylvania
- Length: 12.173 mi (19.591 km)
- Existed: 1975–present

U.S. Route 222 Business (US 222 Bus.) is a 12.17-mile (19.59 km) business route of US 222 located in Reading, Pennsylvania. The southern terminus is at US 222 in Cumru Township. Its northern terminus is at US 222 in Ontelaunee Township. The route begins at the US 222 freeway and heads through the southwestern suburbs of Reading as Lancaster Avenue, intersecting PA 724 in Shillington. US 222 Bus. continues into Reading on Lancaster Avenue and intersects the northern termini of PA 625 and PA 10 before reaching an interchange with the US 422 freeway. The business route crosses the Schuylkill River and becomes Bingaman Street. US 222 Bus. turns north on 5th Street and intersects US 422 Bus. in downtown Reading and the southern terminus of PA 61 to the north of downtown. The route interchanges with the PA 12 freeway and continues north through suburban Muhlenberg Township as 5th Street Highway. US 222 Bus. reaches Temple and continues northeast to its northern terminus as Allentown Pike. US 222 Bus. is the only auxiliary route of US 222 in Pennsylvania.

With the creation of the U.S. Highway System in 1926, the road between Reading and Lancaster was designated US 222 while the road between Reading and Allentown was part of US 22, which ran along what was designated the William Penn Highway in 1916 and PA 3 in 1924. In the late 1920s, US 222 briefly ran concurrent with PA 41 and PA 240 at different times. PA 42 originally ran north–south through Reading starting in 1927. By 1930, the concurrent state route designations were removed from US 222 and US 22. US 222 entered Reading along with PA 73 along Lancaster Avenue and Bingaman Street before turning north on 9th Street along with PA 83 to end at US 22 and US 422 at Penn Street. US 22 continued north on 9th Street out of Reading and continued along Kutztown Road through Temple toward Allentown. US 120 began at US 222 at Bingaman Street and headed north on 4th Street and Center Street out of Reading. In 1931, US 22 was moved to a more direct alignment between Harrisburg and Allentown, and US 222 was extended north along the former alignment between Reading and Allentown. US 222 was shifted to use Lancaster Avenue, Bingaman Street, and 5th Street and 5th Street Highway through the Reading area in the 1930s, running concurrent with US 122 through downtown Reading. The US 122 and PA 73 concurrencies were removed by 1966. In 1975, US 222 was rerouted to bypass Reading on the West Shore Bypass and the Warren Street Bypass, with the former alignment through the city becoming US 222 Bus. In 1998, US 222 Bus. was extended north to its current terminus following the rerouting of US 222 to a new outer bypass of Reading. The business route was extended south to its current endpoint in 2004 with the completion of the US 222 freeway south of Reading to Mohnton.
