= Edward W. Haviland House =

Historic house in Maryland, United States

- U.S. National Register of Historic Places
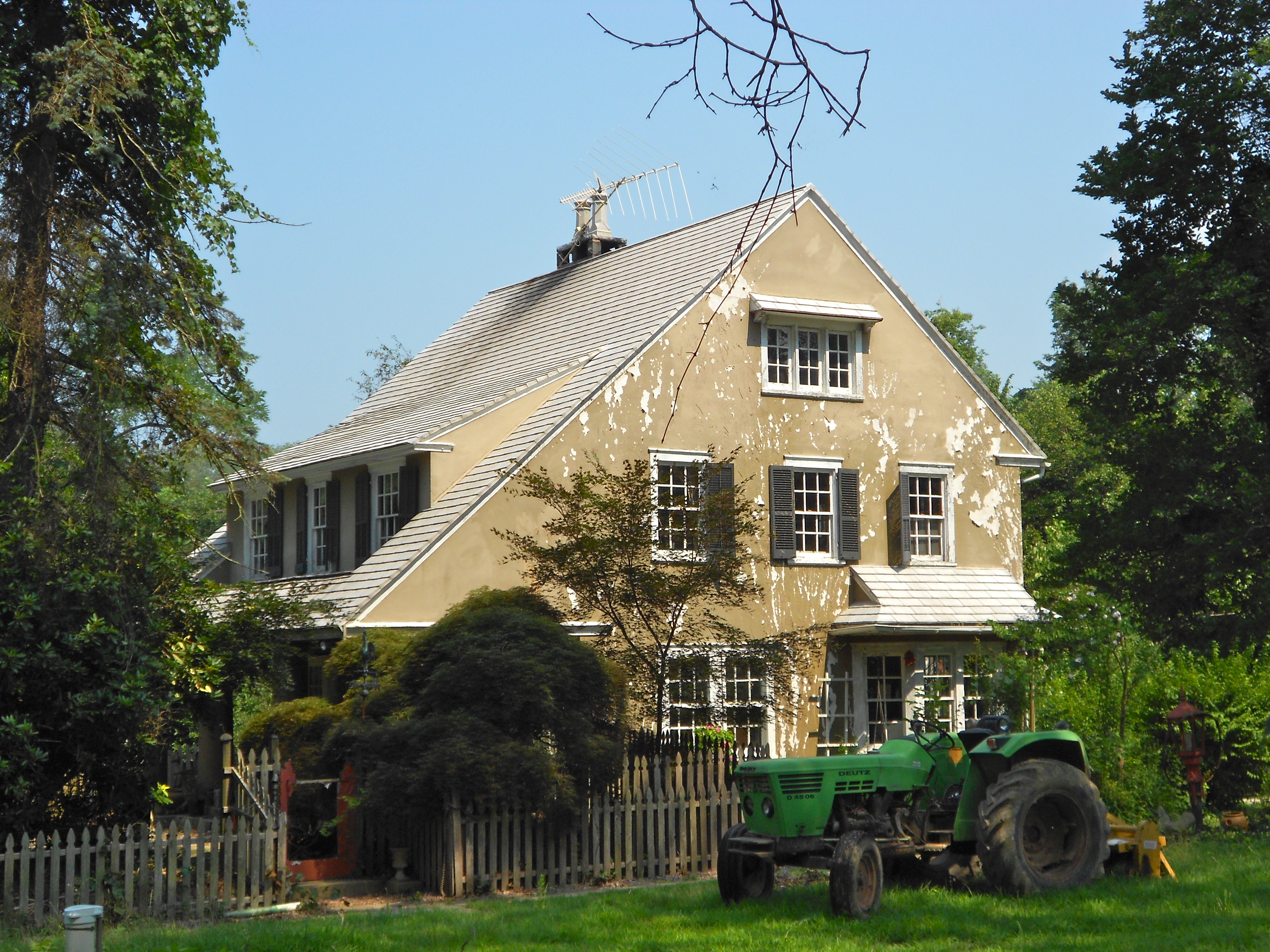
- Edward W. Haviland House, July 2013

- Location within Maryland Location within the United States
- Location: 2464 Frenchtown Rd., Port Deposit, Maryland
- Coordinates: 39°36′22″N 76°6′6″W
- Area: 1.5 acres (0.61 ha)
- Built: 1913
- Architect: McDowell, Charles J.; Barker, J.A.
- Architectural style: Colonial Revival
- NRHP reference No.: 00001480
- Added to NRHP: December 7, 2000

The Edward W. Haviland House is a historic home located at Port Deposit, Cecil County, Maryland, United States. It is a 2 1/2-story, 12-room, stuccoed frame building constructed in 1913 in the Dutch Colonial style. In 1926, a large frame double garage and carriage house was built to the rear of the main house. The house was designed by architect Charles J. McDowell.

The Edward W. Haviland House was listed on the National Register of Historic Places in 2000.
