= Paw Paw Building =

- U.S. National Register of Historic Places
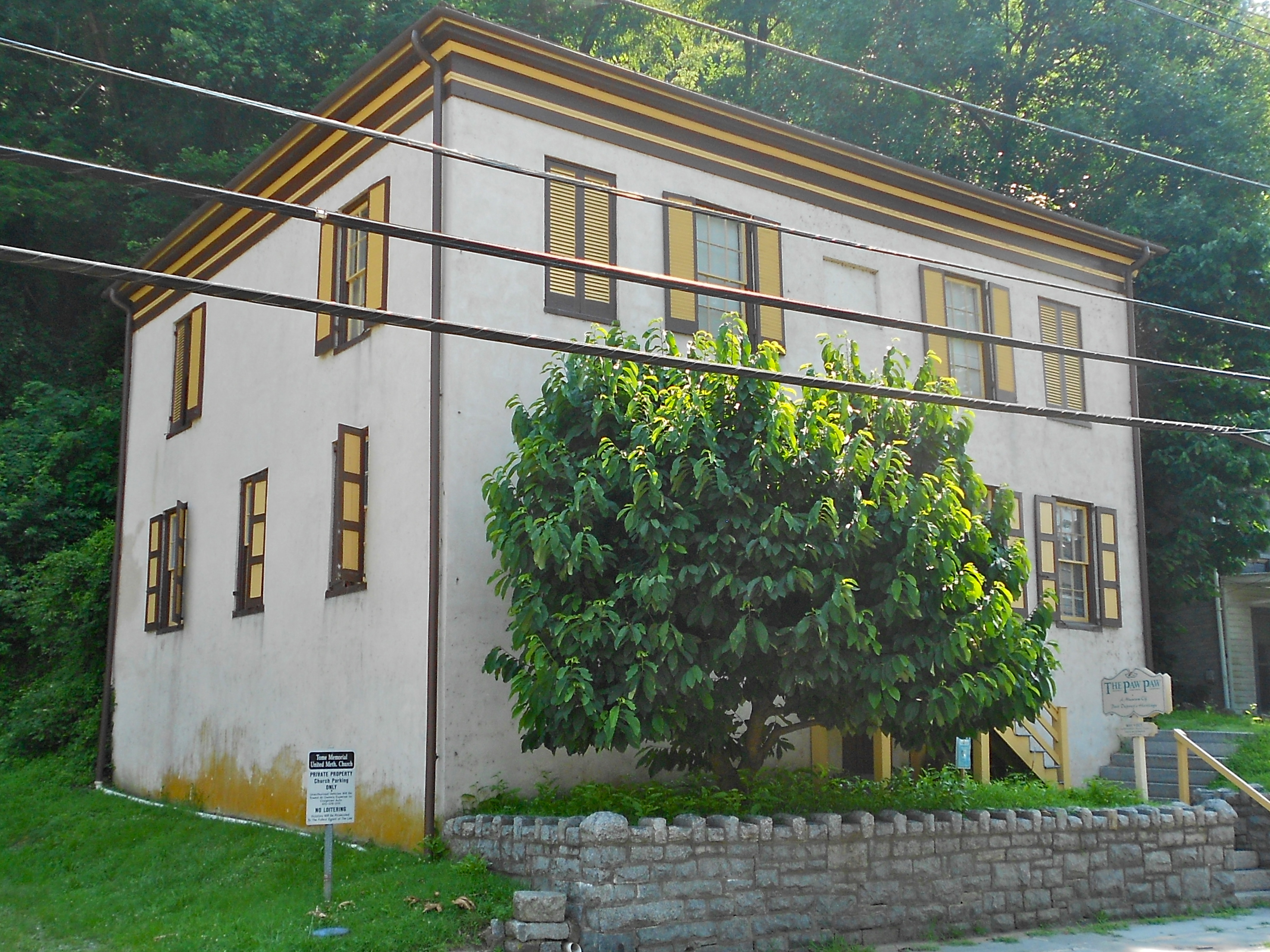
- Paw Paw Building, July 2013

- Location within Maryland Location within the United States
- Location: 98 N. Main St., Port Deposit, Maryland
- Coordinates: 39°36′28″N 76°7′7″W
- Area: 1.5 acres (0.61 ha)
- Built: 1824
- NRHP reference No.: 77000690
- Added to NRHP: November 28, 1977

Paw Paw Building, also known as Odd Fellows Hall, is a historic building located at Port Deposit, Cecil County, Maryland. It is a two-story, 36-by-40-foot (11 by 12 m), stone structure covered with plaster, that was built in 1821 by the First Methodist Episcopal congregation. It was used as a church until 1839. It was then used as a school called Heath of Health Academy and later Odd Fellows Academy. It later held a grocery store and "dining salon" until converted for use as an apartment and recreation hall.

It was listed on the National Register of Historic Places in 1977.
