= Woodlawn, Cecil County, Maryland =

Unincorporated community in Maryland, USA

Coordinates: 39°38′03″N 76°04′33″W

Woodlawn is an unincorporated community of Cecil County, Maryland, situated 3.1 miles (5.0 km) northeast of Port Deposit.

== Geography ==
Woodlawn is situated in the Piedmont Plateau at 456 feet (139 m) above sea level, about 4 miles (6.4 km) east of the Susquehanna River and 8 miles (13 km) north of the Chesapeake Bay. The land is rich with deposits of clay, sand and gravel.

== History ==
Cecil County purchased a 37-acre sand and gravel quarry to serve as a county landfill in 1965. The Woodlawn County Landfill operated until 1981 and was added to the National Priorities List by the United States Environmental Protection Agency in July 1987 after it was discovered that industrial waste was contaminating the local groundwater. A focused feasibility study was authorized in August 1998.

Soil sampling at the Woodlawn Landfill site in March 1997 revealed an adjacent site, subsequently named Woodlawn II and nicknamed Son of Woodlawn, to be polluting a tributary of nearby Basin Run. The 55-acre site has since been remediated and named Woodlawn Wildlife Area. The site is owned and operated by Bridgestone America Holdings.

Woodlawn is not to be confused with the 305-acre farm known as the Woodlawn estate of William Ward of Cecil County. Part of the tract, located in Earleville, Maryland, was given for the construction of St. Stephen's Episcopal Church.

== See also ==
- List of Superfund sites in Maryland
