= Oakwood, Maryland =

Unincorporated community in Maryland, United States

- Unincorporated community
- Location within the State of Maryland Oakwood (the United States)
- Coordinates: 39°41′56″N 76°10′48″W
- Country: United States
- State: Maryland
- County: Cecil
- Elevation: 371 ft (113 m)
- Time zone: UTC-5 (Eastern (EST))
  - Summer (DST): UTC-4 (EDT)
- GNIS feature ID: 586283

Oakwood (formerly Mount Pleasant and Mexico) is an unincorporated community, in Cecil County, Maryland, United States. It lies at an elevation of 371 feet (113 m).
