= Maryland Route 273 =

Highway in Maryland

Maryland Route 273
- Maryland Route 273 highlighted in red

Route information
- Maintained by MDSHA
- Length: 16.58 mi (26.68 km)
- Existed: 1927–present
- Tourist routes: Mason and Dixon Scenic Byway

Major junctions
- West end: US 1 near Harrisville
- MD 276 in Harrisville; MD 274 in Rising Sun; MD 272 in Calvert; MD 213 in Fair Hill
- East end: DE 273 near Appleton

Location
- Country: United States
- State: Maryland
- Counties: Cecil

Highway system
- Maryland highway system; Interstate; US; State; Scenic Byways
← MD 272	→ MD 274

Maryland Route 273 (MD 273) is a state highway in the U.S. state of Maryland. Known for most of its length as Telegraph Road, the highway runs 16.58 miles (26.68 km) from U.S. Route 1 (US 1) near Harrisville east to the Delaware state line near Appleton, where the highway continues east as Delaware Route 273 (DE 273). MD 273 is the main east–west highway of northern Cecil County, connecting Conowingo (via US 1), Port Deposit (via MD 276), and Rising Sun with Newark, Delaware, via the communities of Calvert and Fair Hill, where the highway intersects MD 272 and MD 213, respectively. The state highway also provides access to the Fair Hill Training Center and the Fair Hill Natural Resources Management Area.

MD 273 west of Fair Hill was constructed as one of the original state roads starting in the early 1910s. MD 273 west of and through Rising Sun was the original course of US 1, which was paved from the Susquehanna River to northeast of Rising Sun in the 1910s. The state highway east of Rising Sun was paved in several sections between the mid-1910s and the late 1920s. The portion of original US 1 west of Octoraro Creek comprised a western segment of MD 273 from the late 1920s to the late 1950s. The section of US 1 that followed present-day MD 273 was reconstructed in the early to mid-1950s, shortly before MD 273 was extended west to its present western terminus when US 1 was placed on the Rising Sun Bypass in the late 1950s. The highway was reconstructed from east of Rising Sun to the Delaware state line in several stages from the late 1950s to the early 1970s.

== Route description ==
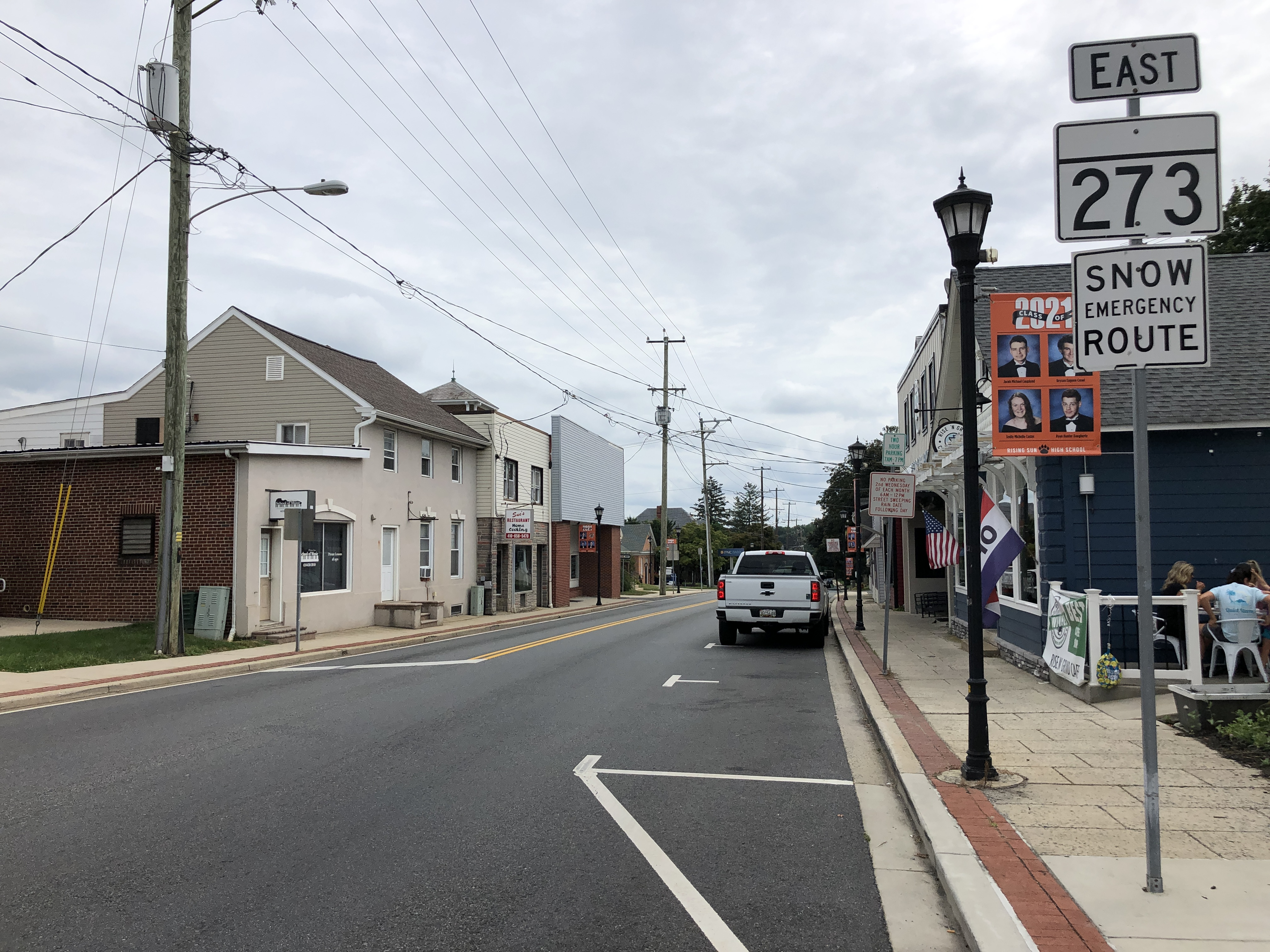
MD 273 eastbound past MD 274 in Rising Sun

MD 273 begins west of Harrisville at a perpendicular intersection with US 1, which heads south as Conowingo Road and north as the Rising Sun Bypass. The state highway heads south then immediately turns east onto Rising Sun Road. Rising Sun Road to the west of the intersection is officially MD 273A; that auxiliary highway is signed as MD 273 eastbound from US 1, and is closed to through traffic westbound. MD 273 heads east as a two-lane undivided road through the hamlet of Harrisville, where the highway passes the Nathan and Susannah Harris House located on the north side of the road, before meeting MD 276 (Jacob Tome Memorial Highway) at a roundabout. The state highway enters the town of Rising Sun, where its name changes to Main Street and the highway intersects the western end of MD 274 (Queen Street). After leaving the town limits, MD 273 becomes Telegraph Road and intersects Half Mile Turn and Sylmar Road; Half Mile Turn is a one-lane ramp from Sylmar Road to MD 273. The state highway passes north of the Jeremiah Brown House and Mill Site and the Plumpton Park Zoo before crossing North East Creek.

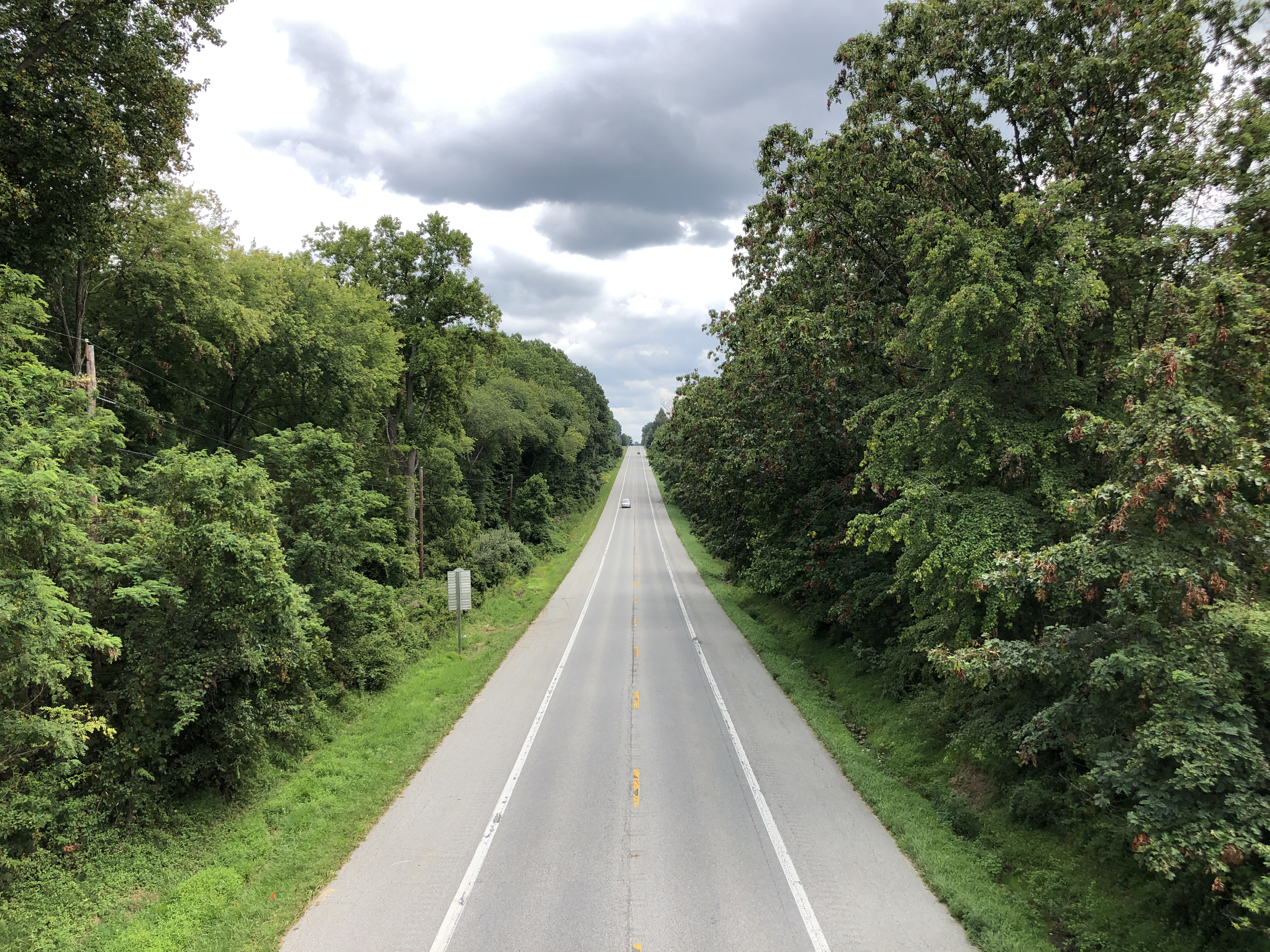
View east along MD 273 east of MD 213 in Fair Hill

MD 273 continues east through farmland to the community of Calvert, where the highway intersects MD 272, which heads south as North East Road and north as Chrome Road. Brick Meetinghouse Road partially parallels the present course to the south, providing access to the East Nottingham Friends Meetinghouse and the Elisha Kirk House. MD 273 crosses Little North East Creek, intersects Blue Ball Road at a roundabout in Blue Ball Village, and meets Little Elk Creek Road, which leads north to Little Elk Farm and the historic home Hopewell. The state highway crosses Little Elk Creek just west of Rock United Presbyterian Church located north of the road as the highway reaches Fair Hill, where Fair Hill Drive parallels MD 273 to the south before the intersection with MD 213, which heads south as Singerly Road and north as Lewisville Road. Beyond MD 213, MD 273 passes through Fair Hill Natural Resources Management Area, a state park most well known for the Fair Hill Training Center, an equestrian training facility, and also the site of the Fair Hill Fairgrounds that hosts the Cecil County Fair. The state highway passes under three service bridges within the park and parallels an abandoned alignment located north of the road as it crosses Big Elk Creek. MD 273 leaves the state park just west of a roundabout with Appleton Road in Appleton. The route reaches its eastern terminus at the Delaware state line, where the road continues east as DE 273 (Nottingham Road) toward the city of Newark.

== History ==
The portion of MD 273 west of Fair Hill was included in the planned state road system by the Maryland State Roads Commission in 1909. The planned state road continued west from MD 273's present terminus near Harrisville along the present and old alignments of US 1 to the Conowingo Bridge over the Susquehanna River. The portions of the state road between Oakwood and Octoraro Creek and from the east town limit of Rising Sun to between Sylmar Road and North East Creek were paved as 14-foot-wide (4.3 m) macadam road in 1910 and 1911. The highway between Oakwood and the Conowingo Bridge was completed as a 14-foot-wide (4.3 m) concrete road in 1914. The road from east of Sylmar Road to east of Calvert was under construction by 1915 and completed by 1919. Part of the gap between Octoraro Creek at Porters Bridge and Rising Sun was filled with construction of a 15-to-18-foot-wide (4.6 to 5.5 m) concrete road in two stages, the first completed by 1919 and the second completed by 1921. The road from Appleton to the Delaware state line was completed as a 15-foot-wide (4.6 m) concrete road in 1921 and 1922, and the highway from east of Calvert to east of Blue Ball was completed in 1923. The gap between Blue Ball and Fair Hill was completed by 1927, the same year US 1 was marked from the Conowingo Bridge through Rising Sun to Sylmar. The final piece of MD 273 to be paved was from Fair Hill to Appleton, which was built as a concrete road in 1929 and 1930.

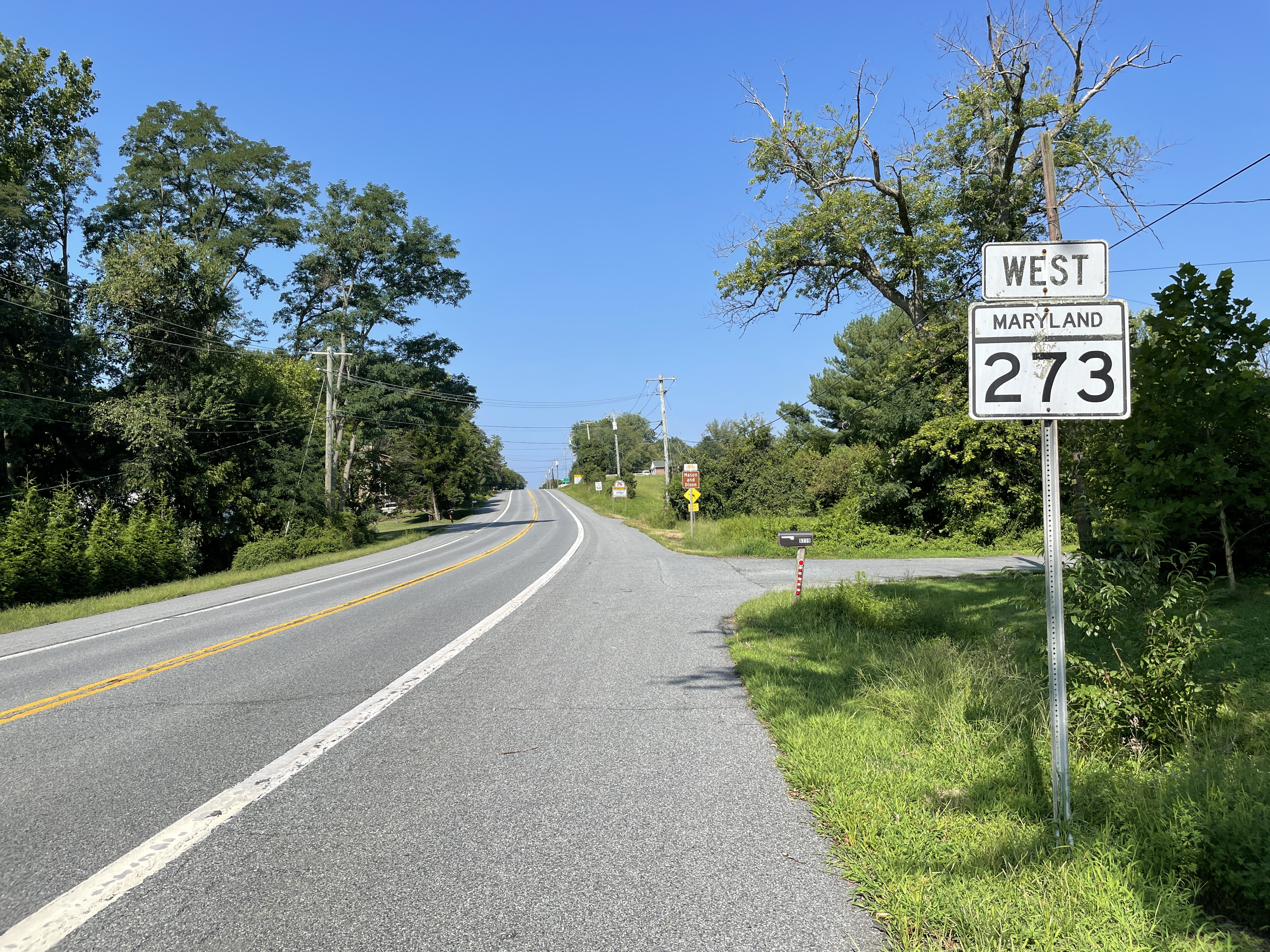
MD 273 westbound past its eastern terminus at DE 273 at the Delaware border near Appleton

US 1 bypassed the portion of the state road west of Octoraro Creek when the highway's modern route crossing the Susquehanna River at Conowingo Dam was completed in 1928. The old highway west of Octoraro Creek—which followed Old Conowingo Road, Ragan Road, and Connelly Road—became a western section of MD 273. This section was transferred from state to county maintenance in a road transfer agreement on May 8, 1958. The main section of MD 273 was extended west slightly when US 1 was relocated onto the Half Mile Turn to eliminate the right-angle turn at the intersection of Telegraph Road and Sylmar Road in 1935. US 1 was reconstructed through Cecil County in the early to mid-1950s, including the Harrisville–Sylmar portion of what is now MD 273. The U.S. Highway was reconstructed and widened from Conowingo through Harrisville to Rising Sun in 1952 and 1953. The highway from Rising Sun to Sylmar was reconstructed and widened in 1954 and 1955. MD 273 was extended west through Rising Sun and Harrisville to its present western terminus when US 1's Rising Sun Bypass opened in 1957.

The first section of MD 273 east of Sylmar to be reconstructed was through Calvert, bypassing Brick Meetinghouse Road, which became MD 809. This section was built in conjunction with the relocation of MD 272 at Calvert between 1956 and 1958. The highway from east of Fair Hill to the Delaware state line was reconstructed between 1963 and 1965. As part of this work, the highway was relocated and a new bridge was built at Big Elk Creek; part of the old highway on the east side of the creek was transferred from the state to Fair Hill Training Center through an agreement on July 16, 1970. MD 273 was reconstructed from Sylmar Road to west of Calvert between 1969 and 1971. The highway from west of Little Elk Creek to east of Fair Hill was reconstructed and relocated between 1971 and 1973. The new highway bypassed Fair Hill Drive, which was transferred to the county after the new highway was completed and the old highway was resurfaced according to an October 8, 1969, road transfer agreement. The final portion of MD 273 to be reconstructed, from east of Calvert to west of Little Elk Creek, was started in 1972 and completed in 1973. MD 273's western terminus was moved to a perpendicular intersection with US 1 in 2001. The highway's roundabout with MD 276 in Harrisville was built in 2002 and 2003, the same years Main Street through Rising Sun underwent a streetscape project.

In September 2016, construction began on $2.1 million project to build a roundabout at Appleton Road in Appleton; the roundabout opened to traffic in 2017. A roundabout was constructed at the intersection with Blue Ball Road near Fair Hill. Construction of the $2.5 million project was originally supposed to begin in March 2016 and be finished in December of that year but was delayed by utility relocations and design errors. Construction of the roundabout at Blue Ball Road began by July 2017 but was then stalled by the original contractor. In 2019, a new contractor was brought in to finish the project, with construction completed in 2020.

== Junction list ==
The entire route is in Cecil County.

Location	mi	km	Destinations	Notes
Harrisville	0.00	0.00	US 1 (Conowingo Road/Rising Sun Bypass) – Baltimore, Philadelphia	Western terminus
Harrisville	0.06	0.097	Rising Sun Road west	Officially MD 273A; signed as MD 273 eastbound from US 1; no through traffic westbound
Harrisville	0.66	1.06	MD 276 (Jacob Tome Memorial Highway) to I-95 / US 40 – Port Deposit	Roundabout
Rising Sun	1.60	2.57	MD 274 east (Queen Street) – North East	Western terminus of MD 274
Calvert	6.16	9.91	MD 272 (Chrome Road/North East Road) to I-95 – Oxford, North East	
Fair Hill	12.22	19.67	MD 213 (Lewisville Road/Singerly Road) – Lewisville, Elkton	
Appleton	16.58	26.68	DE 273 east (Nottingham Road) – Newark	Delaware state line; eastern terminus
1.000 mi = 1.609 km; 1.000 km = 0.621 mi

== Auxiliary route ==
MD 273A is the designation for the 0.22-mile-long (0.35 km) section of Rising Sun Road from a one-lane eastbound ramp from northbound US 1 to its intersection with MD 273. The route starts as a one-lane eastbound ramp before it turns into a two-lane undivided road. MD 273A was designated in 2001 when MD 273's western terminus was relocated to a perpendicular intersection with US 1.
