= Maryland Route 272 =

Highway in Maryland

Maryland Route 272
- Maryland Route 272 highlighted in red

Route information
- Maintained by MDSHA
- Length: 20.67 mi (33.27 km)
- Existed: 1927–present

Major junctions
- South end: Elk Neck State Park
- MD 7 in North East; US 40 in North East; I-95 near North East; MD 274 at Bay View; MD 273 at Calvert
- North end: PA 272 at the Pennsylvania state line near Nottingham, PA

Location
- Country: United States
- State: Maryland
- Counties: Cecil

Highway system
- Maryland highway system; Interstate; US; State; Scenic Byways
← MD 270	→ MD 273

Maryland Route 272 (MD 272) is a state highway in the U.S. state of Maryland. The state highway runs 20.67 miles (33.27 km) from Turkey Point within Elk Neck State Park north through North East to the Pennsylvania state line near Calvert, where the highway continues as Pennsylvania Route 272 (PA 272). MD 272 is the main north–south highway of central Cecil County, connecting the Elk Neck Peninsula between the North East River and Elk River with U.S. Route 40 (US 40) and Interstate 95 (I-95) in North East, MD 273 in Calvert, and Rising Sun via MD 274. The section of MD 272 between North East and Bay View was paved by 1910. The remainder of the state highway north to Calvert and south to Elk Neck was completed in several sections in the 1930s. The first relocations of MD 272 occurred when both railroads near North East were bridged in the early 1940s and mid-1950s. Multiple relocations occurred in the late 1950s and early 1960s along the whole length of the highway to eliminate curves and tie the state highway into I-95. MD 272 reached its current extent when it was extended south into Elk Neck State Park in 1979.

== Route description ==
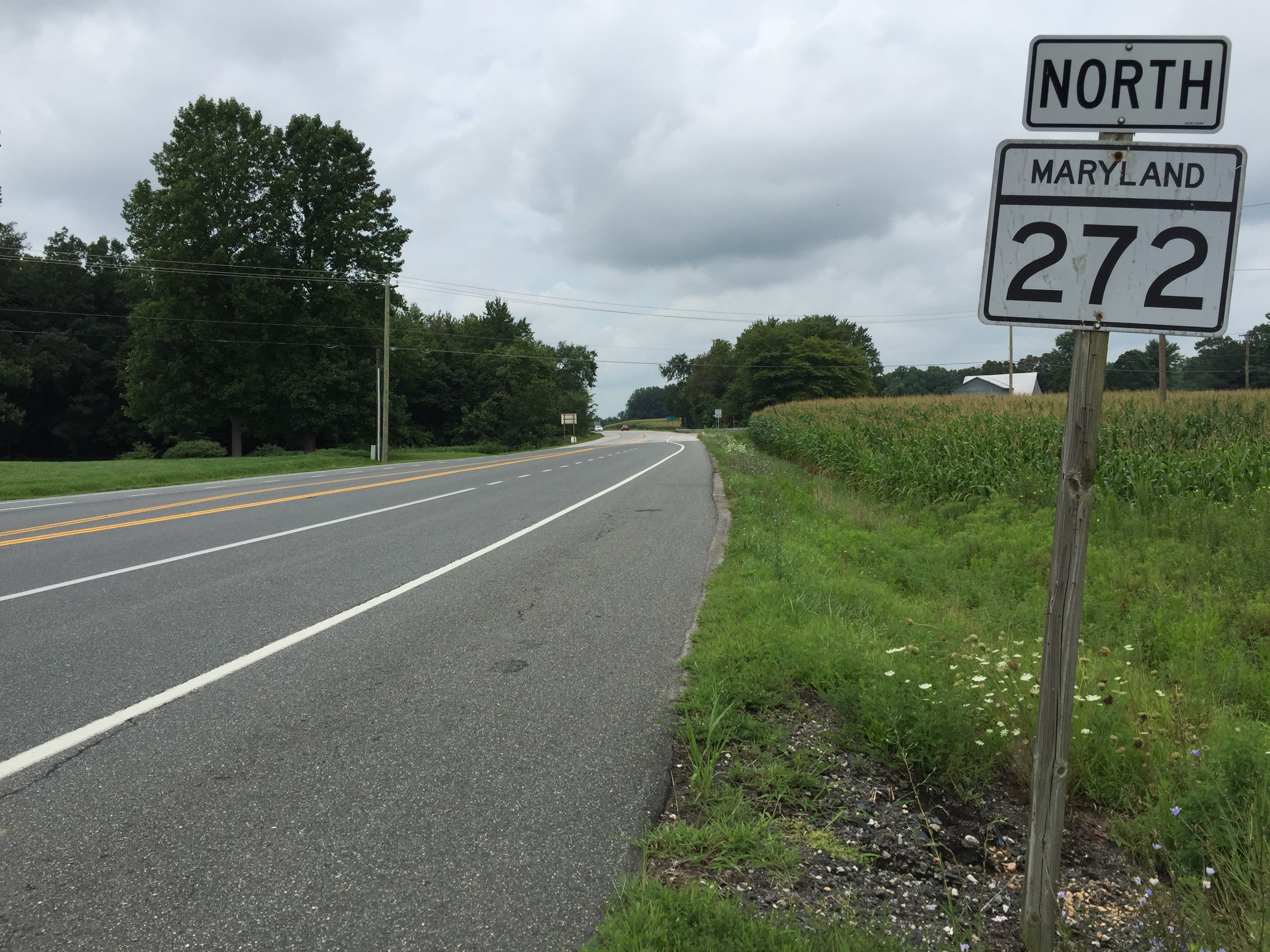
View north along MD 272 at MD 273 in Calvert

MD 272 begins at an entrance to Elk Neck State Park at the trailhead for the Turkey Point Light, which lies at the end of the namesake peninsula between the Elk River to the east and the Chesapeake Bay to the west. The state highway heads north as two-lane undivided Turkey Point Road through a residential area before returning to the state park property. MD 272 passes through several curves and passes by access roads to campgrounds and the other features of the park and by the park headquarters. The state highway emerges from the state park and passes by the Rodney Scout Reservation before curving north at its intersection with Elk River Lane in the hamlet of Elk Neck. MD 272's roadway widens and parallels Arrants Road and Old Log Cabin Road; along the latter highway, the state highway passes between Sandy Cove Camp and the Black Hill unit of Elk Neck State Forest. The route crosses Hance Point Creek and parallels Hance Point Road across Ford Run and by North East Little League Park to where the roads meet on the edge of Chesapeake Bay Golf Club at North East.

Immediately before entering the town of North East, MD 272 splits into a one-way pair composed of two-lane Mauldin Avenue northbound and one-lane Main Street southbound. Within town, Main Street passes east of St. Mary Anne's Episcopal Church and both streets intersect MD 7 (Cecil Avenue). North of MD 7, Mauldin Street reduces to one lane and both streets cross North East Creek, which becomes the North East River on the southwest side of town. The two directions of MD 272 come together heading northwest as Mauldin Avenue while Main Street splits north to a dead end, then the state highway crosses over Amtrak's Northeast Corridor railroad line and leaves the town limits. MD 272 gains a second lane northbound and intersects US 40 (Pulaski Highway), where the highway's name changes to North East Road. The state highway curves north at a tangent intersection with Rogers Road, where the highway becomes two lanes again. MD 272 parallels two segments of Leslie Road on either side of the state highway's bridge over CSX's Philadelphia Subdivision railroad line at the hamlet of Leslie and passes east of a park and ride facility north of the railroad. The state highway expands to a four-lane divided highway at Lums Road and parallels Marysville Road to its six-ramp partial cloverleaf interchange with I-95 (John F. Kennedy Memorial Highway).

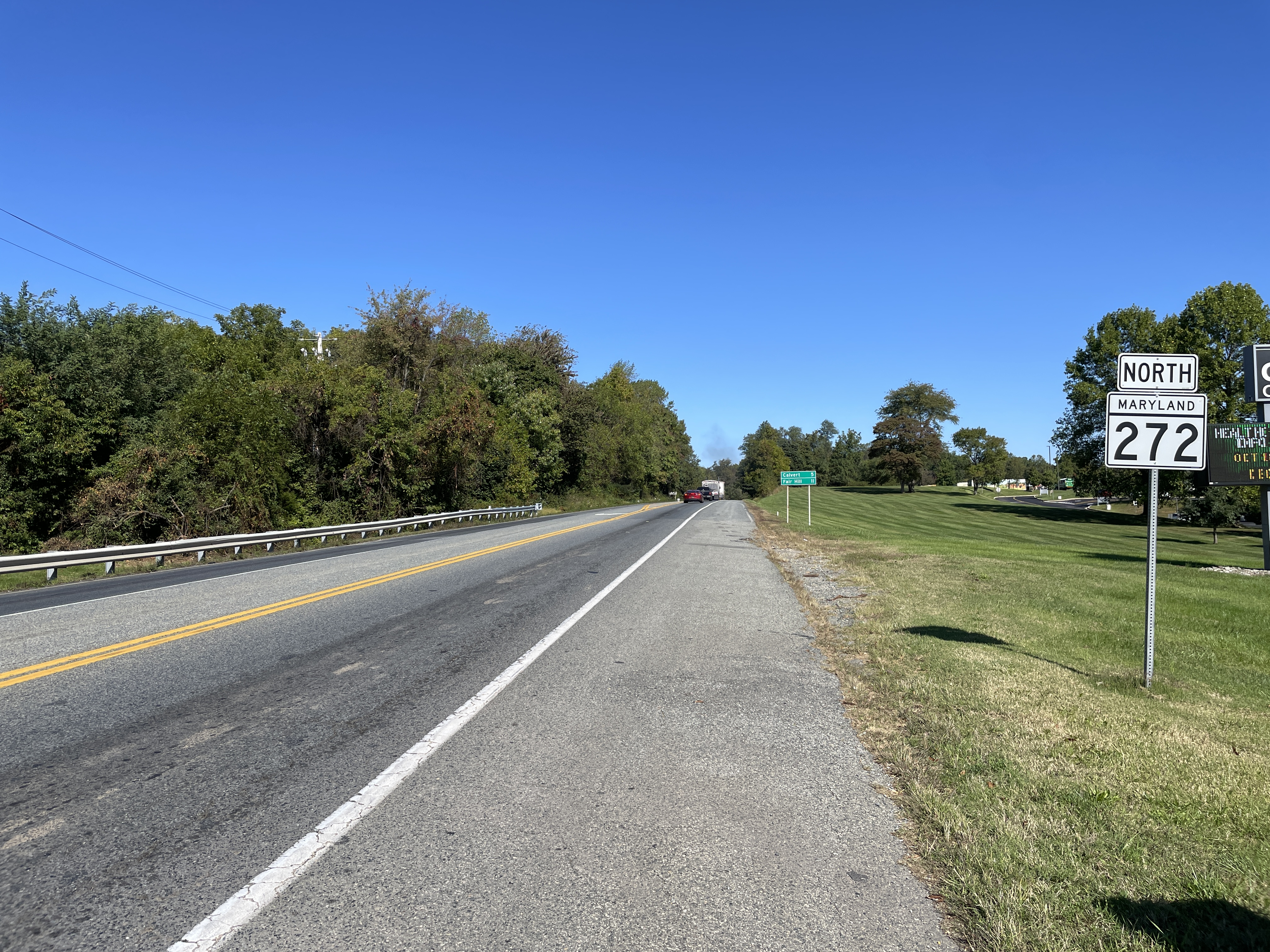
MD 272 northbound past MD 274 in Bay View

North of I-95 in the hamlet of Bay View, MD 272 parallels Old Bayview Road, reduces to a two-lane undivided road, and passes through an intersection with the eastern terminus of MD 274 (Joseph Biggs Memorial Highway) at the entrance to Cecil College, which is located to the east. North of its junction with the northern end of Old Bayview Road, the state highway crosses North East Creek parallel with the Gilpin's Falls Covered Bridge to the southeast of the road. MD 272 heads north and parallels Old Zion Road through the hamlet of Zion. The state highway passes west of Rising Sun High School on its way to Calvert, where the highway intersects MD 273 (Telegraph Road). MD 272 parallels Quaker Lane and Walnut Garden Road south and north of MD 273, respectively. Quaker Lane leads northwest to the East Nottingham Friends Meetinghouse and the Elisha Kirk House. MD 272 continues north from MD 273 as Chrome Road and passes to the west of the John Churchman House before reaching its northern terminus the Pennsylvania state line, where Chrome Road continues north as PA 272 toward Chrome and Nottingham.

MD 272 is a part of the National Highway System as a principal arterial from School House Lane just south of North East to Old Bayview Road north of MD 274 in Bay View.

== History ==
The first portion of MD 272 to be built was from Cecil Avenue in North East north to Old Farmington Road in Bay View. This highway was constructed as a macadam road by Cecil County with state aid by 1910. That road was resurfaced in 1926 and 1927; in addition, Main Street in North East was paved as a 15-foot-wide (4.6 m) concrete road from US 40 (Cecil Avenue) to the south end of town. A second section of MD 272 was built as a concrete road from south of Zion to Calvert between 1927 and 1930. This northern section was extended north from Calvert to the Pennsylvania state line as a concrete road in 1932. MD 272 was extended south from North East to what is now Hance Point Road as a concrete road starting in 1930 and was completed to Hance Point Road by 1933. The highway was extended as a macadam road to Old Log Cabin Road in 1934 and 1935. The gap between Bay View and Calvert was filled, including a new bridge parallel to the Gilpin's Falls Covered Bridge over North East Creek, around 1936. MD 272 was completed from Elk Neck to the Pennsylvania state line when the final section of highway south to Old Elk Neck Road was constructed as a gravel road in 1938 and 1939.

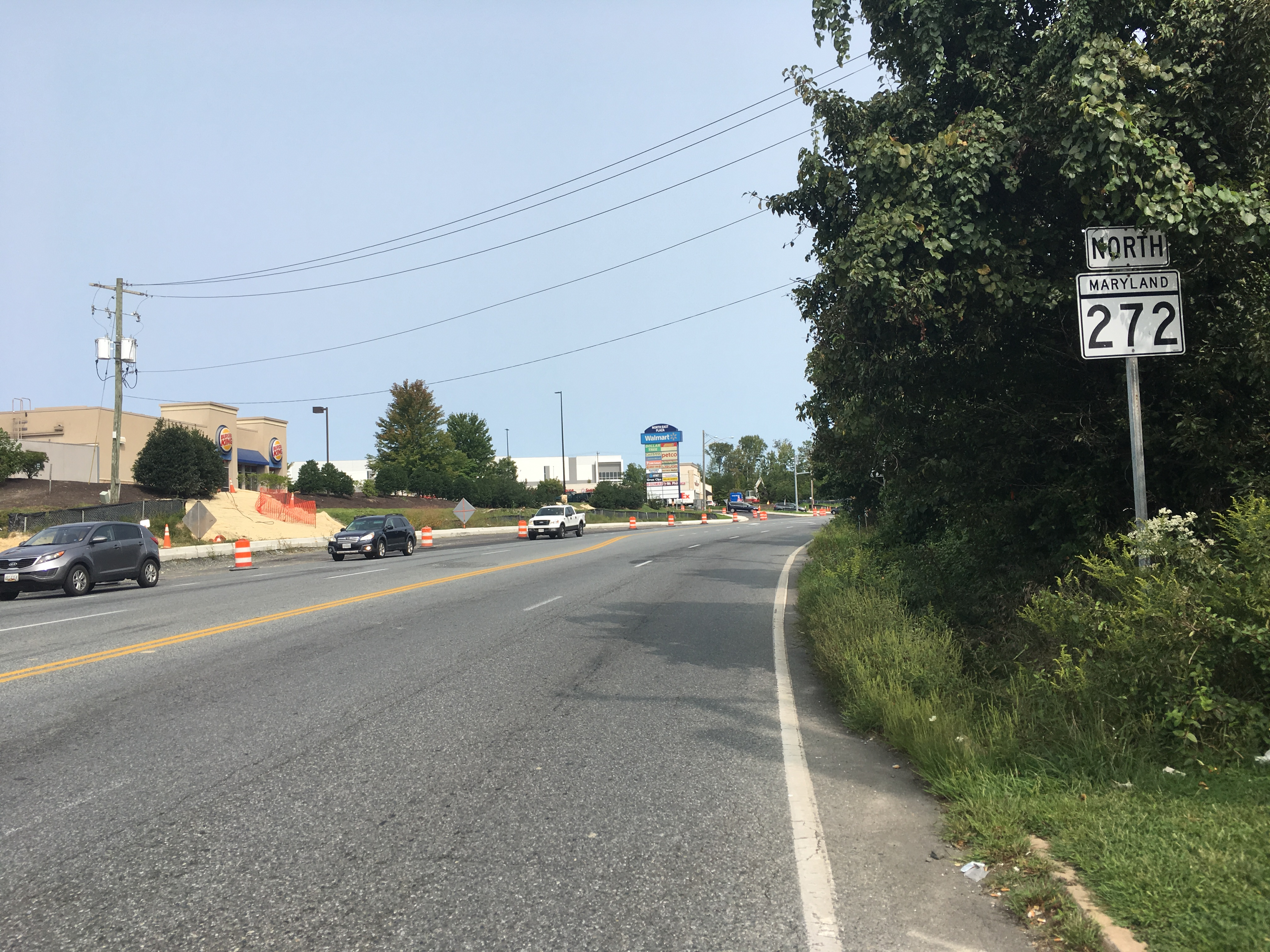
MD 272 northbound past US 40 in North East

The first realignment of MD 272 occurred in 1941 when a bridge was constructed over the Baltimore and Ohio Railroad (now CSX) at the hamlet of Leslie north of North East. The Main Street bridge over North East Creek in North East was replaced in 1945 as an accelerated non-military wartime project approved by the War Production Board, replacing a 1903 truss bridge. The next realignment occurred with a bridge over the Pennsylvania Railroad (now Amtrak) in North East; the bridge and approaches were placed under construction in 1954 and completed in 1956. The railroad grade separation was the first of many projects to relocate and widen MD 272 over the next several years. The highway was reconstructed from the Pennsylvania state line to south of Calvert, including a relocation at Calvert, between 1956 and 1958. MD 272 was reconstructed from Elk Neck to south of Northeast in 1957 and 1958, bypassing three stretches of highway. The highway was reconstructed from south of Calvert to the bridge across North East Creek at Gilpin's Falls in 1958 and 1959, resulting in a bypass of Zion.

The last major project to modernize MD 272 over this period took place along the highway from Leslie to Gilpin's Falls from 1958 to 1961. The new highway was built in anticipation of the Northeast Expressway (now John F. Kennedy Memorial Highway): A four-span bridge was built to cross the freeway between 1959 and 1961. The freeway itself and its diamond interchange with MD 272 were built between March 1962 and November 1963 and opened November 15, 1963. The new course of MD 272 bypassed the center of Bay View and part of the relocation built as part of the Leslie railroad grade elimination 20 years earlier. The highway's current travel pattern through North East was implemented in the late 1960s. Main Street was resurfaced in 1966, and the pre-existing portion of Mauldin Avenue from Thomas Avenue to MD 7 was transferred from town to state maintenance through a road transfer agreement on January 30, 1967. Mauldin Avenue was extended in both directions, including construction of a new bridge over North East Creek, in 1968 and 1969 to form the northbound component of a one-way pair.

MD 272 reached its present length through a December 27, 1979, road transfer agreement that reassigned maintenance of Turkey Point Road south of Elk Neck from the county to the state. Another agreement the same day also transferred the old portions of MD 272, which had been redesignated sections of MD 699, to county maintenance. The state constructed the park and ride facility south of I-95 in 1999 and 2000. At the same time, MD 272 was expanded to a four-lane divided highway from Lums Road to MD 274, and the north side of the I-95 interchange was reconstructed to form a partial cloverleaf, work that finished in 2001. The route's bridge across North East Creek at Gilpin's Falls was replaced in 2001 and 2002, and Main Street through North East underwent a streetscape project to revitalize the center of town in 2003. In 2015, construction began to replace MD 272's bridge across Amtrak's Northeast Corridor. The first phase of the bridge replacement was completed and opened to traffic in 2019, with the former bridge removed to allow for construction of the second phase. The second phase of the bridge replacement concluded in 2020.

== Junction list ==
The entire route is in Cecil County.

Location	mi	km	Destinations	Notes
Elk Neck State Park	0.00	0.00	Entrance to Turkey Point parking lot – Turkey Point Light	Southern terminus
North East	11.60	18.67	MD 7 (Cecil Avenue) – Charlestown, Elkton	
North East	12.22	19.67	US 40 (Pulaski Highway) – Baltimore, Philadelphia	
North East	14.00	22.53	I-95 (John F. Kennedy Memorial Highway) – Baltimore, New York	I-95 Exit 100
Bay View	14.60	23.50	MD 274 west (Joseph Biggs Memorial Highway) – Rising Sun	Eastern terminus of MD 274
Calvert	19.35	31.14	MD 273 (Telegraph Road) – Rising Sun, Newark	
Calvert	20.67	33.27	PA 272 north (Chrome Road) – Oxford	Continuation into Pennsylvania
1.000 mi = 1.609 km; 1.000 km = 0.621 mi

== Auxiliary routes ==
MD 272 has three former auxiliary routes. These routes were spurs between current MD 272 and segments of MD 699, which was the number assigned to bypassed sections of MD 272. All three highways were transferred from state to county maintenance in a road transfer agreement on December 27, 1979.

- MD 272A was the designation for the 0.02-mile-long (0.032 km) spur between MD 272 and the northern end of MD 699A (Walnut Garden Road) at Calvert. The route was created after the completion of MD 272's realignment at Calvert in 1958.
- MD 272B was the designation for the 0.05-mile-long (0.080 km) spur between MD 272 and the northern end of MD 699G (Rogers Road) in North East. The route was created after the completion of MD 272's realignment and bridge over the Pennsylvania Railroad in North East in 1956.
- MD 272C was the designation for the 0.08-mile-long (0.13 km) spur between MD 272 and the southern end of MD 699E, the roadway of which no longer exists south of Peninsula Drive, between MD 272's bridge over the Baltimore and Ohio Railroad and Peninsula Drive at Leslie. The route was created after the completion of MD 272's realignment between Leslie and Bay View in 1961.
