= Maryland Route 274 =

State highway in Maryland, United States

Maryland Route 274
- Maryland Route 274 highlighted in red

Route information
- Maintained by MDSHA
- Length: 7.35 mi (11.83 km)
- Existed: 1927–present

Major junctions
- West end: MD 273 in Rising Sun
- East end: MD 272 in Bay View

Location
- Country: United States
- State: Maryland
- Counties: Cecil

Highway system
- Maryland highway system; Interstate; US; State; Scenic Byways
← MD 273	→ MD 275

Maryland Route 274 (MD 274) is a state highway in the U.S. state of Maryland. Known for most of its length as Joseph Biggs Memorial Highway, the state highway runs 7.35 miles (11.83 km) from MD 273 in Rising Sun east to MD 272 in Bay View. In conjunction with MD 272, MD 274 connects Rising Sun with Interstate 95 (I-95) in central Cecil County. The highway was built near Rising Sun in two segments, one before 1910 and the other in the mid-1920s. MD 274 was completed to Bay View in the early 1940s. The highway was relocated at Bay View in the late 1960s and reconstructed the rest of the way to Rising Sun in the late 1970s and early 1980s. MD 274 had a truck bypass using MD 273 and MD 272 via Calvert.

== Route description ==
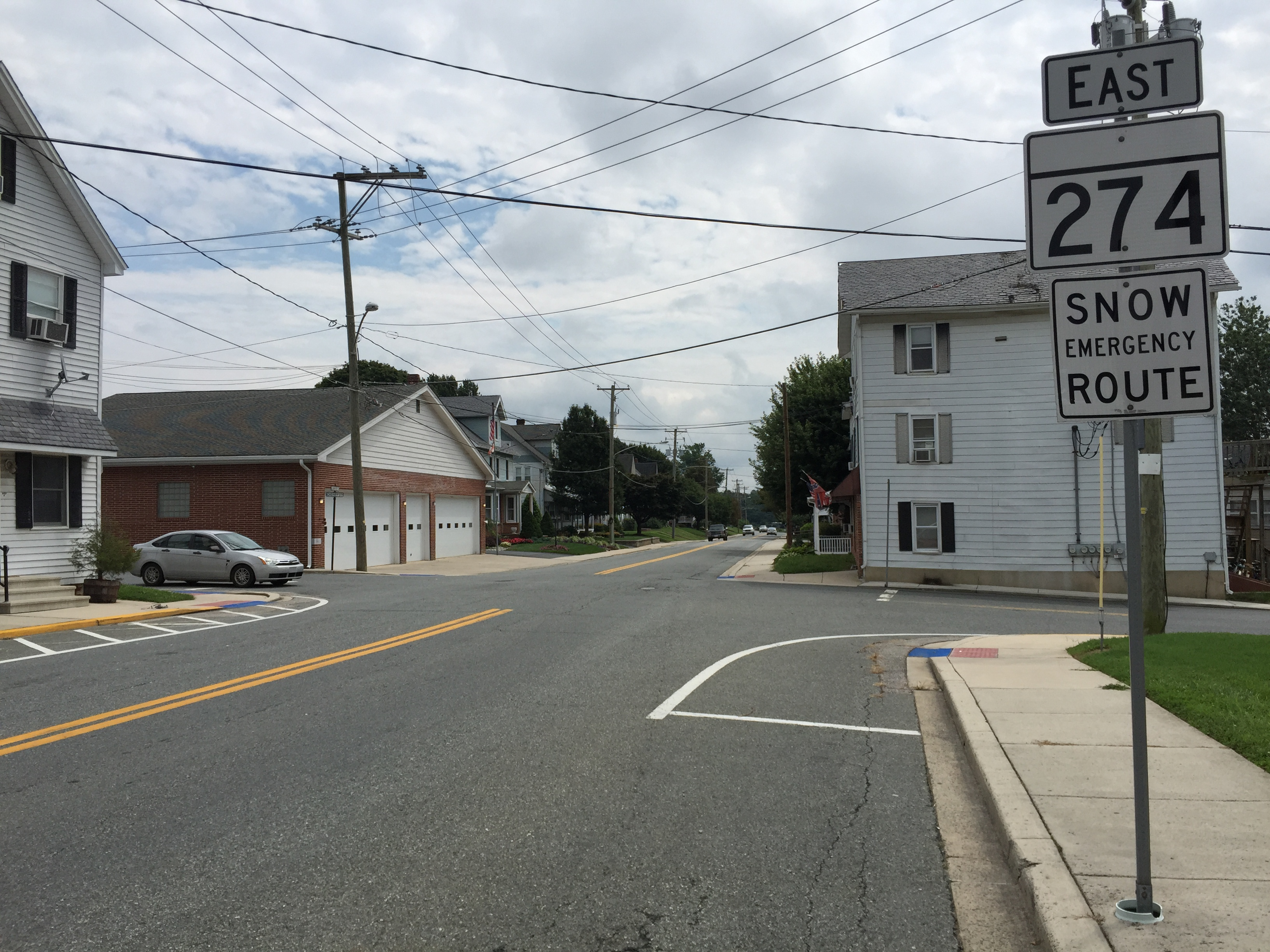
View east along MD 274 past MD 273 in Rising Sun

MD 274 begins at an intersection with MD 273 (Main Street) in the town center of Rising Sun. The highway follows two-lane undivided Queen Street south to the town limit, where the route intersects the Octoraro Rail Trail. At this point, the highway continues southeast as Joseph Biggs Memorial Highway. The highway was named for Joseph B. Biggs, a county commissioner of Cecil County in the 1970s. MD 274 follows the ridge separating North East Creek to the northeast from Principio Creek and Stony Run to the southwest. The highway passes through the hamlets of Farmington and Greenhurst. In the latter hamlet, MD 274 intersects Calvert Road and parallels Ebenezer Church Road; the parallel segments of these roads are MD 274A and MD 274B. The highway passes south of the Chesapeake Bay Golf Club at Rising Sun and then intersects Old Farmington Road and Old Bayview Road in Bay View. There, MD 274 reaches its eastern terminus at MD 272 (North East Road) across from the entrance to Cecil College and a short distance north of MD 272's interchange with I-95 (John F. Kennedy Memorial Highway).

== History ==
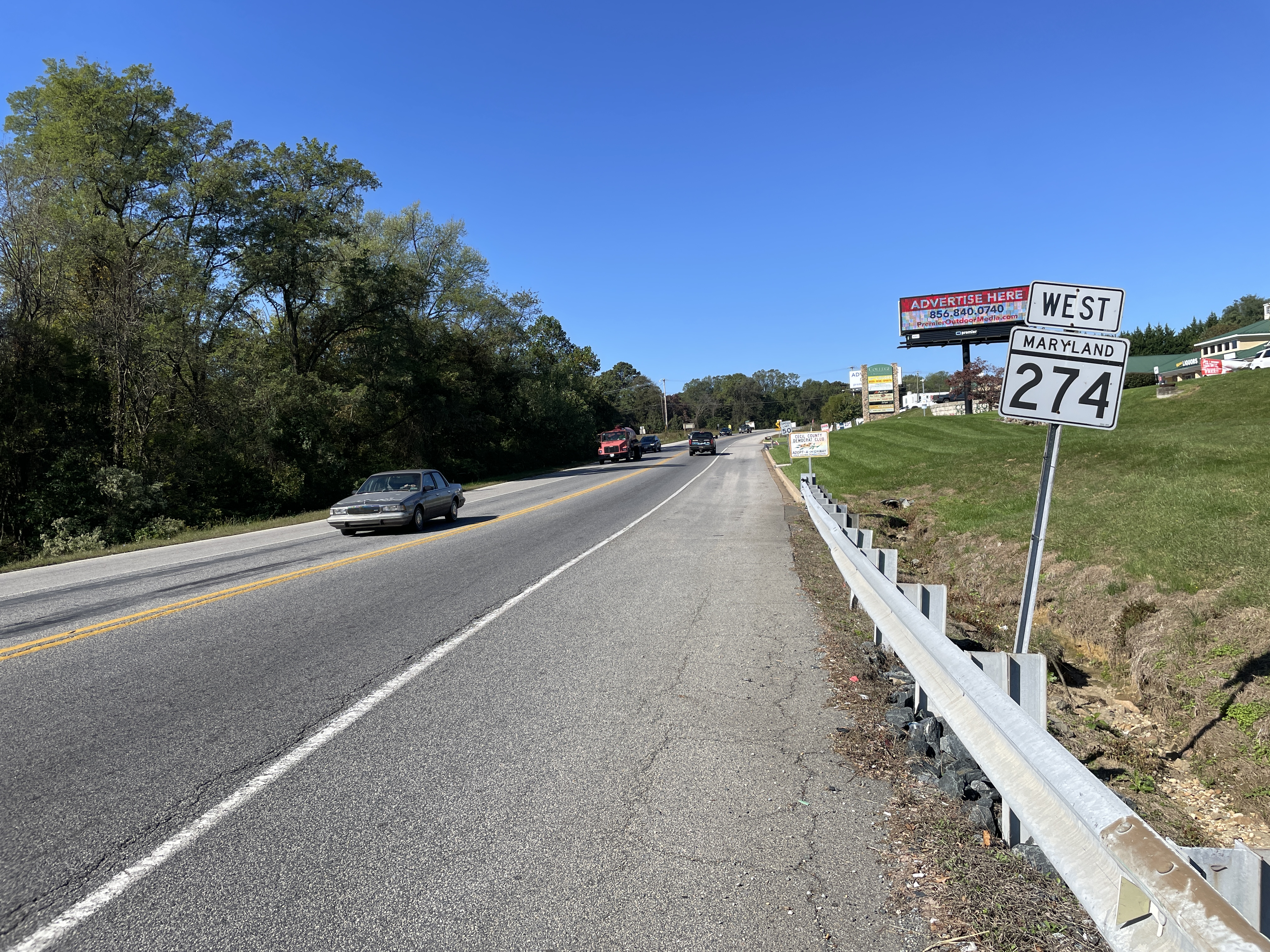
View west along MD 274 past MD 272 in Bay View

A section of present-day MD 274 was constructed as a macadam road by Cecil County with state aid from Farmington north to Pierce Road south of Rising Sun by 1910. The gap between that section and MD 273 in Rising Sun was filled by 1927. MD 274 was extended southeast to Post Road near Greenhurst (also known as College Green) as a concrete road in 1929. The highway remained a spur from Rising Sun to Greenhurst until the highway to Bay View was completed in 1942. The first section of MD 274 to be placed in its modern form was the segment between Old Bay View Road, then MD 699, and modern MD 272; this piece was built in 1965. This highway was extended northwest to Old Farmington Road in 1968 and 1969. MD 274 was reconstructed from Post Road through Farmington to the town limit of Rising Sun between 1978 and 1980. The final stretch of MD 274 to be reconstructed was from Post Road to Bay View, which bypassed what is now Ebenezer Church Road at Greenhurst, between 1982 and 1984. Queen Street in Rising Sun was maintained by the town until the town's section of the state highway was transferred to state maintenance in a January 5, 1979, road transfer agreement.

== Junction list ==
The entire route is in Cecil County.

Location	mi	km	Destinations	Notes
Rising Sun	0.00	0.00	MD 273 (Main Street) to US 1 – Bel Air, Newark, DE	Western terminus
Bay View	7.35	11.83	MD 272 (North East Road) to I-95 – Calvert, North East	Eastern terminus
1.000 mi = 1.609 km; 1.000 km = 0.621 mi

== Auxiliary routes ==
MD 274 has a pair of auxiliary routes around Greenhurst. These highways form much of the old alignment of MD 274 left behind when the highway was relocated there in the early 1980s.

- MD 274A is the designation for Calvert Road, which runs 0.12 miles (0.19 km) from the intersection of MD 274 and MD 274B north and west to a dead end, between which the highway meets the southern end of county-maintained Calvert Road.
- MD 274B is the designation for the state-maintained portion of Ebenezer Church Road. The 0.56-mile-long (0.90 km) state highway begins 0.10 miles (0.16 km) south of Principio Road, south of which Ebenezer Church Road becomes a county highway. MD 274B parallels MD 274 north to its terminus at MD 274 and MD 274A.

== Former truck route ==
Maryland Route 274 Truck was a 9.31-mile (14.98 km) truck bypass of MD 274. The signed route followed MD 273 from MD 274's western terminus in Rising Sun east to MD 272 at Calvert and MD 272 from Calvert south to MD 274's eastern terminus in Bay View.
