= Bay View, Maryland =

Unincorporated community in Maryland, United States

- Unincorporated community
- Location within Maryland
- Coordinates: 39°38′36″N 75°57′41″W
- Country: United States
- State: Maryland
- County: Cecil
- Elevation: 381 ft (116 m)
- Time zone: UTC−5 (Eastern (EST))
  - Summer (DST): UTC−4 (EDT)
- ZIP code: 21901
- Area codes: 410, 443, and 667
- GNIS feature ID: 583069

Bay View is an unincorporated community in Cecil County, Maryland, United States. Bay View is located at the intersection of Maryland routes 272 and 274, north of North East. Cecil College and Gilpin's Falls Covered Bridge are both located in Bay View.
