= Appleton, Maryland =

Unincorporated community in Maryland, United States

- Unincorporated community
- Location within Maryland Location within the United States
- Coordinates: 39°41′54″N 75°48′51″W
- Country: United States
- State: Maryland
- County: Cecil
- Elevation: 335 ft (102 m)
- Time zone: UTC−5 (Eastern (EST))
  - Summer (DST): UTC−4 (EDT)
- ZIP code: 21921
- Area codes: 410, 443, and 667
- GNIS feature ID: 582915

Appleton is an unincorporated community in Cecil County, Maryland, United States. Appleton is located at the intersection of Maryland Route 273 and Appleton Road, north of Elkton and east of Fair Hill.
