= Gilpin's Falls Covered Bridge =

- U.S. National Register of Historic Places
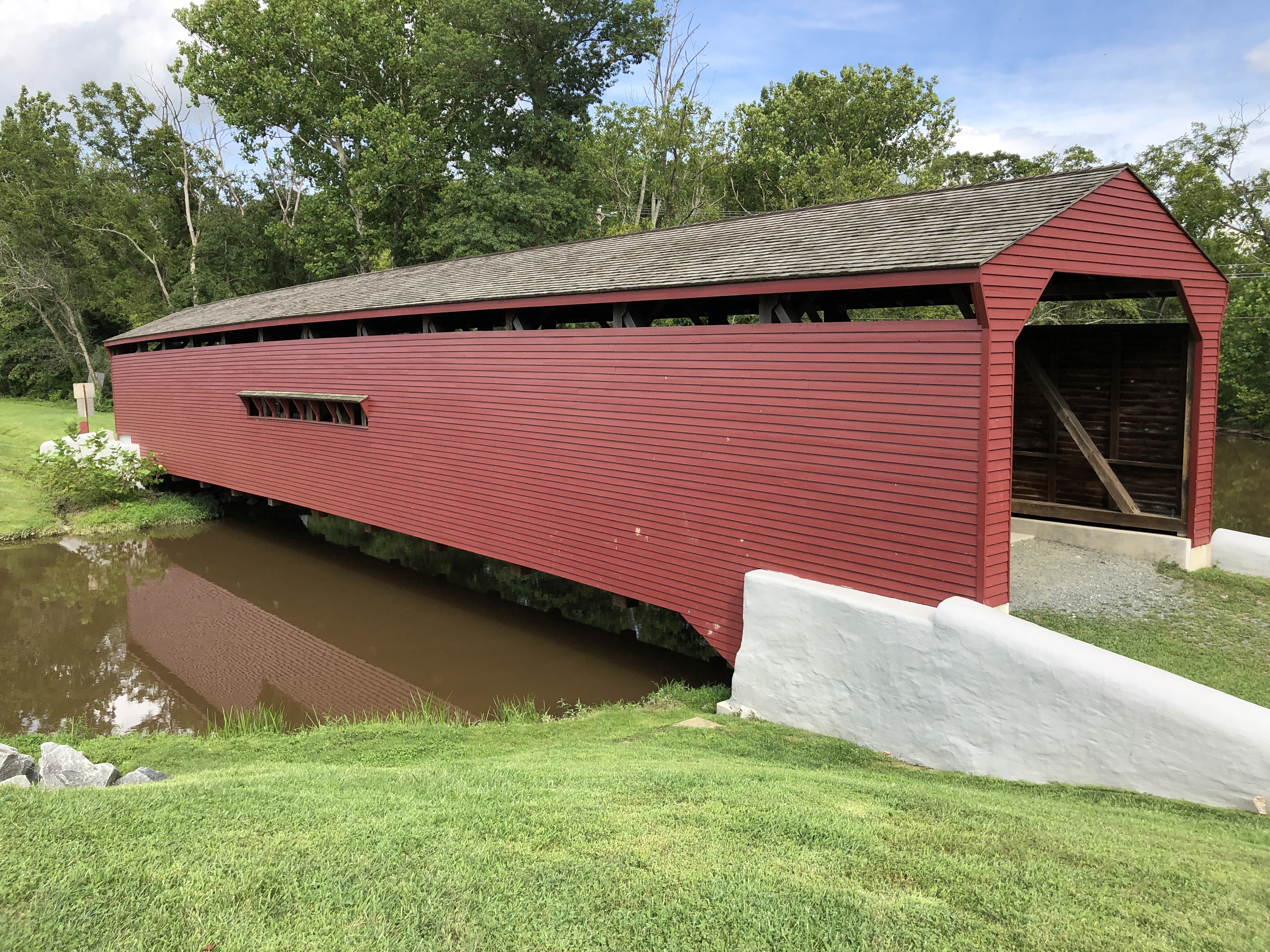
- Gilpins Falls covered bridge

- Location within Maryland Location within the United States
- Nearest city: North East, Maryland
- Coordinates: 39°38′55.8″N 75°57′20.1″W
- Area: 1.3 acres (0.53 ha)
- Built: 1859
- Built by: Johnson, George
- Architectural style: Burr Arch Truss Bridge
- NRHP reference No.: 08001125
- Added to NRHP: December 3, 2008

The Gilpin's Falls Covered Bridge is a Burr arch through truss wooden covered bridge in Bay View, Cecil County, Maryland, United States, close to the town of North East. The bridge was constructed by local Cecil County bridgewright Joseph George Johnson in the autumn and winter of 1860-61 across North East Creek. The bridge was erected adjacent to and upstream of Samuel Gilpin's mills and dam and crosses the millpond formed by it. This bridge has a span of 100 feet (30 m) and a total length of 119 feet (36 m) with its shelter panel overhangs, is 13.5 feet (4.1 m) wide, and is closed to all vehicular traffic.

The structure was restored in 1959 by the State Roads Commission and the Historical Society of Cecil County. In 2010 the bridge was rehabilitated by engineers Wallace, Montgomery & Associates, LLP; contractor Kinsley Construction; and specialist bridgwrighting subcontractors, Barns & Bridges of New England, the Truax Timberwright Woodworks, and New World Restoration.

Gilpin's Falls Covered Bridge was listed on the National Register of Historic Places in 2008.

== Construction details ==
The bridge's trusses, floor beams, ties, and lateral bracing systems are framed almost entirely of eastern white pine (Pinus strobus), a species typically favored for wooden bridge framing in areas of the country where it was found, for its strength-to-weight ratio, as minimizing dead load is a strategy for increasing capacity for live load. So favored for this purpose, Pinus strobus lumber was commonly imported into areas where it was unavailable as an indigenous species. Original rafters were quite easily identifiable from those replaced after the 1958 roof collapse, and were (as are the newly replicated replacements) framed with tulip poplar (Liriodendron tulipifera), also a lightweight species favored by the bridgewrighting community where available. Replicated rafters, like their predecessors, are tapered over their length, one inch wider at their tail than at the ridge. This was likely not an esthetic choice, but done as part of an overall strategy to minimize dead load. The original floor beams were replaced sometime in the 1920s, the bridges final decade of service, with mixed species ash and oak. This was an attempt to increase load capacity. The only original white pine floorbeam to escape replacement was the one found at the centerline of truss, which was tenoned through the king post at midspan. All others were bolted to the sides of their adjacent posts, and were easily replaced. This strategy seems to have failed (the bridge was bypassed in the following decade) and the additional weight was part of the reason why the bridge's framing became severely distorted in the decades of neglect to follow. These hardwood replacements had heavy infestations of deathwatch and powderpost beetles (Bostrichoidea) and were again replaced with timbers of appropriate species in the recently completed restoration.

== Gallery ==
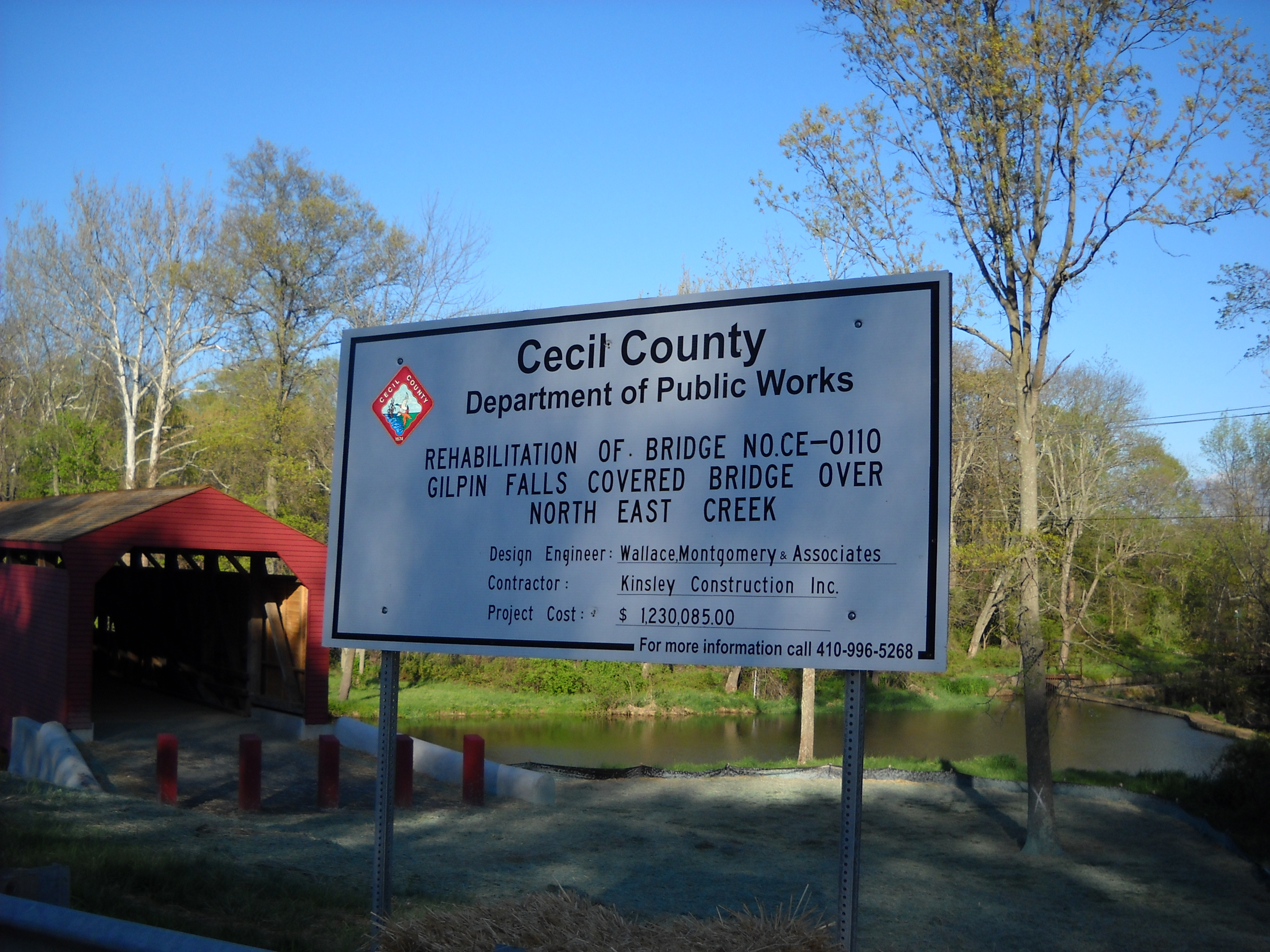
Gilpin's Falls Covered Bridge as rehabilitated in 2010 by engineers Wallace, Montgomery & Associates, LLP, and contractor Kinsley Construction

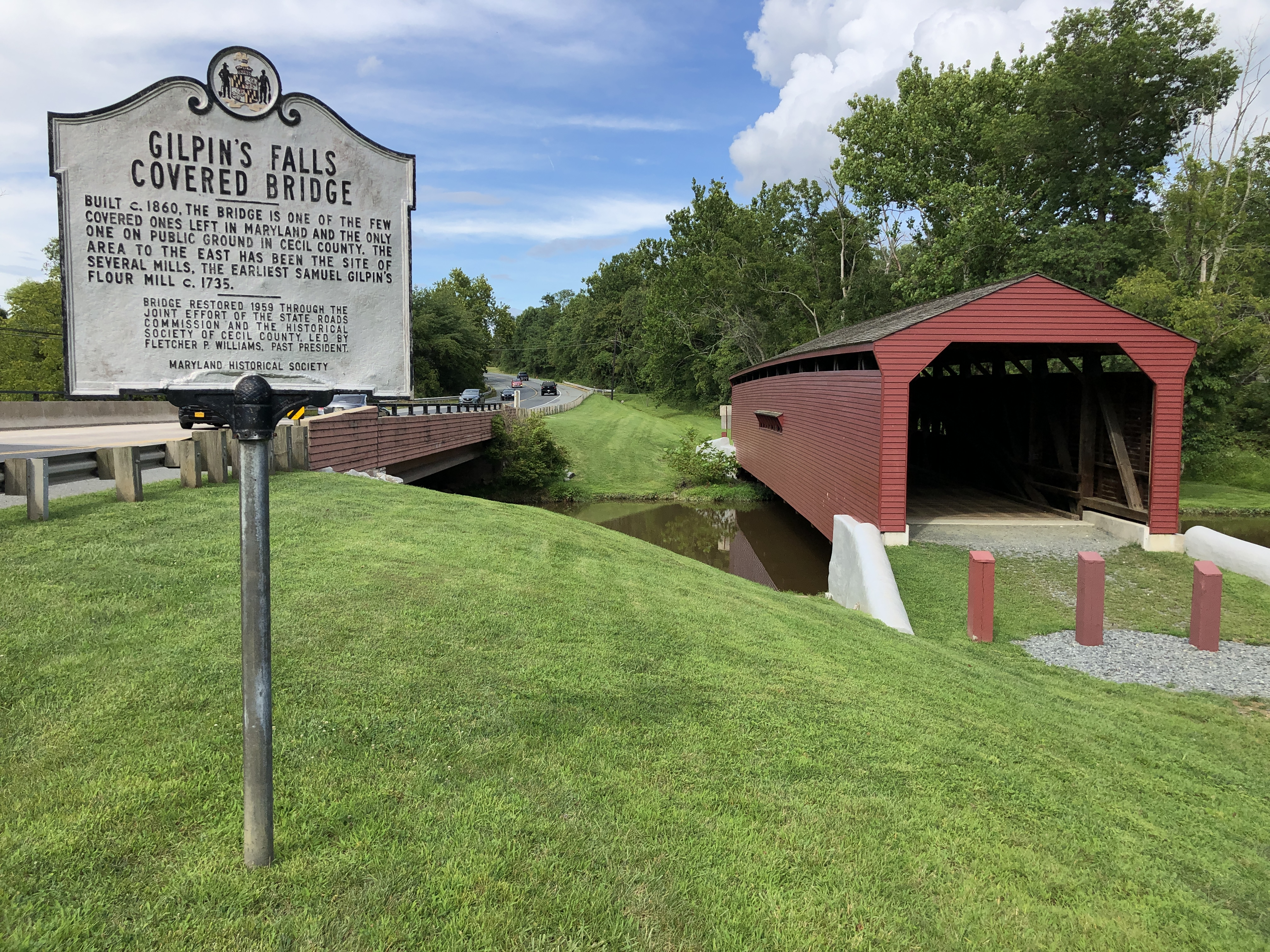
Gilpin's Falls Covered Bridge historic marker

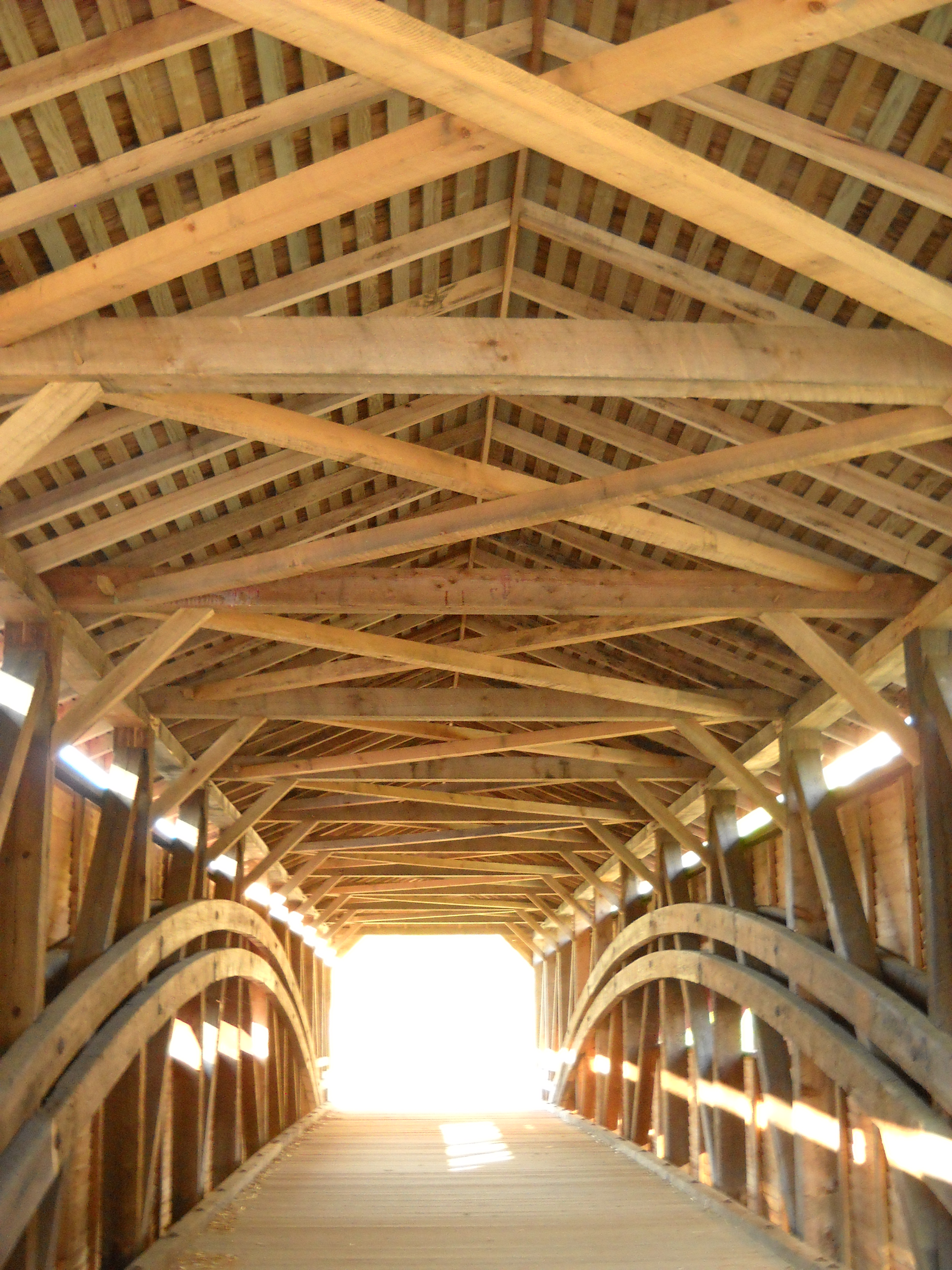
Inside the bridge, showing structural members and construction

== See also ==
- List of bridges documented by the Historic American Engineering Record in Maryland
- List of bridges on the National Register of Historic Places in Maryland
