= Harrisville, Maryland =

Unincorporated community in Maryland, United States

- Unincorporated community
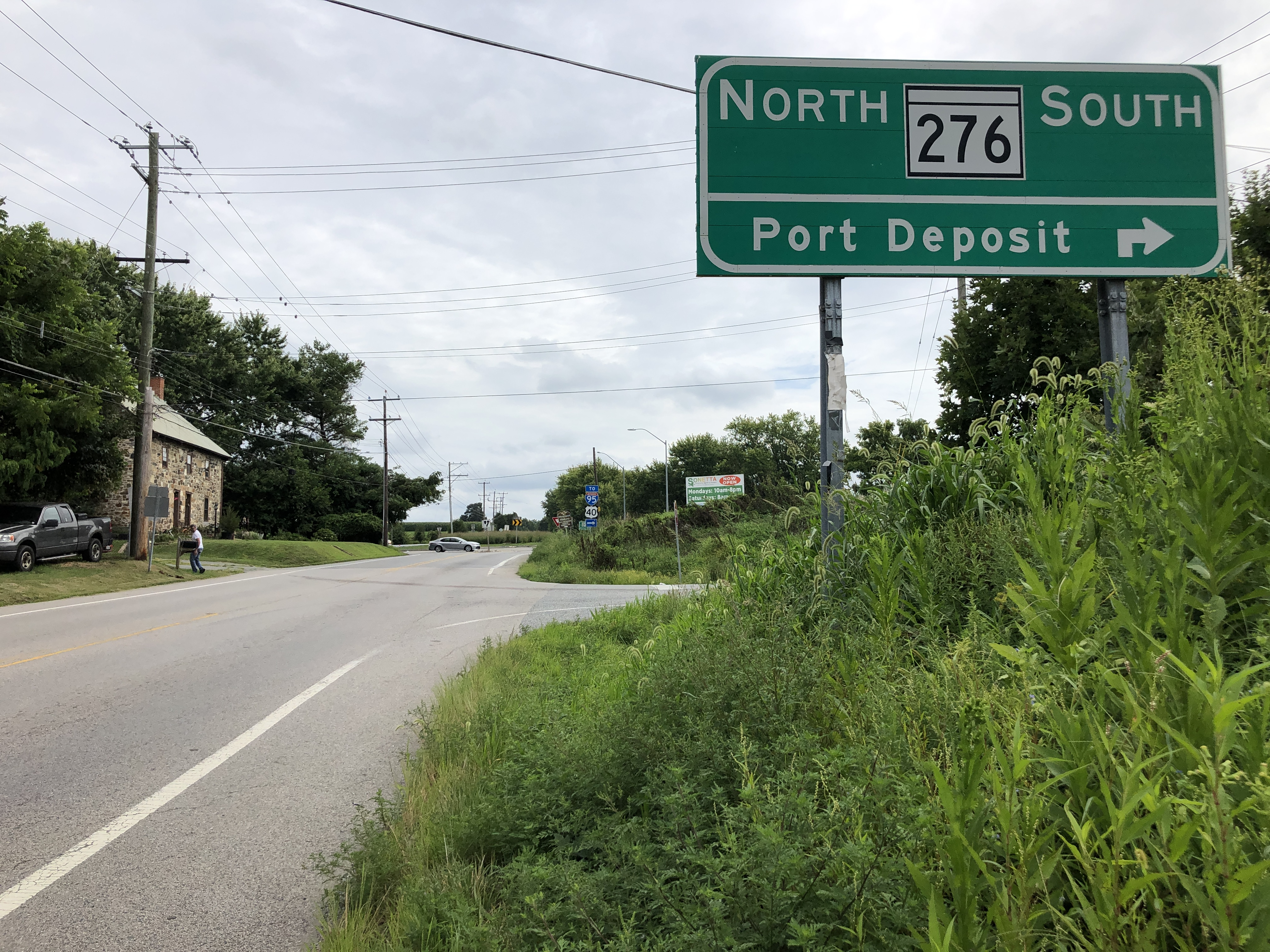

- Location within the State of Maryland Harrisville (the United States)
- Coordinates: 39°41′44″N 76°04′53″W
- Country: United States
- State: Maryland
- County: Cecil
- Time zone: UTC-5 (Eastern (EST))
  - Summer (DST): UTC-4 (EDT)

Harrisville is an unincorporated community in Cecil County, Maryland, United States. It is located west of Rising Sun at the roundabout for Maryland State Routes 273 and 276. The Nathan and Susannah Harris House was listed on the National Register of Historic Places in 1984.
