= Harry Anderson (baseball) =

American baseball player (1931–1998)

- Left fielder
- Born: September 10, 1931; North East, Maryland, U.S.
- Died: June 11, 1998 (aged 66); Greenville, Delaware, U.S.
- Batted: Left Threw: Right

MLB debut
- April 18, 1957, for the Philadelphia Phillies

Last MLB appearance
- May 5, 1961, for the Cincinnati Reds

MLB statistics
- Batting average: .264
- Home runs: 60
- Runs batted in: 242
- Stats at Baseball Reference

Teams
- Philadelphia Phillies (1957–1960); Cincinnati Reds (1960–1961)

Harry Walter Anderson (September 10, 1931 – June 11, 1998), nicknamed "Harry the Horse," was an American professional baseball outfielder and first baseman, who played in Major League Baseball (MLB) for the Philadelphia Phillies and Cincinnati Reds of the National League (NL).

The native of North East, Maryland, was a towering presence, standing 6 feet 3 inches (1.91 m) tall and weighing 205 pounds (93 kg). He batted left-handed and threw right-handed. Anderson is the last big league batter to lead either major league with fewer than 100 strikeouts (95 in 1958).

Anderson attended West Nottingham Academy then West Chester University and was signed in 1953 by the Philadelphia Phillies. Anderson played 484 career games from 1957 to 1961, with the Phillies and Reds. Anderson's first two years in the Major Leagues were his finest. Playing as the Phils' regular left fielder with occasional appearances as a first baseman, Anderson finished in the Top 25 in voting for the National League Most Valuable Player Award in both 1957 and 1958.

During the 1958 campaign, in his sophomore season in Philadelphia, Anderson batted .301, with 23 home runs, and 97 runs batted in (RBI) — all career highs. But his performance went into decline in 1959 and in June 1960 the Phillies traded him to the Reds with Wally Post for outfielders Tony González, a rookie, and veteran Lee Walls. González would be the Phils' starting centerfielder for much of the 1960s. Anderson, meanwhile, continued to struggle in Cincinnati and was sent to the minor leagues during the May 1961 roster cutdown.

Overall, Anderson recorded 419 career hits in 1,586 at bats with 199 runs, 82 doubles, 16 triples, 60 home runs, 242 RBI and 159 walks in the Major Leagues.

In 1992, Anderson was inducted into the Delaware Sports Museum and Hall of Fame. He suffered a fatal heart attack, at his home, in Greenville, Delaware, June 11, 1998, aged 66 years.
