= Plumpton Park Zoo =

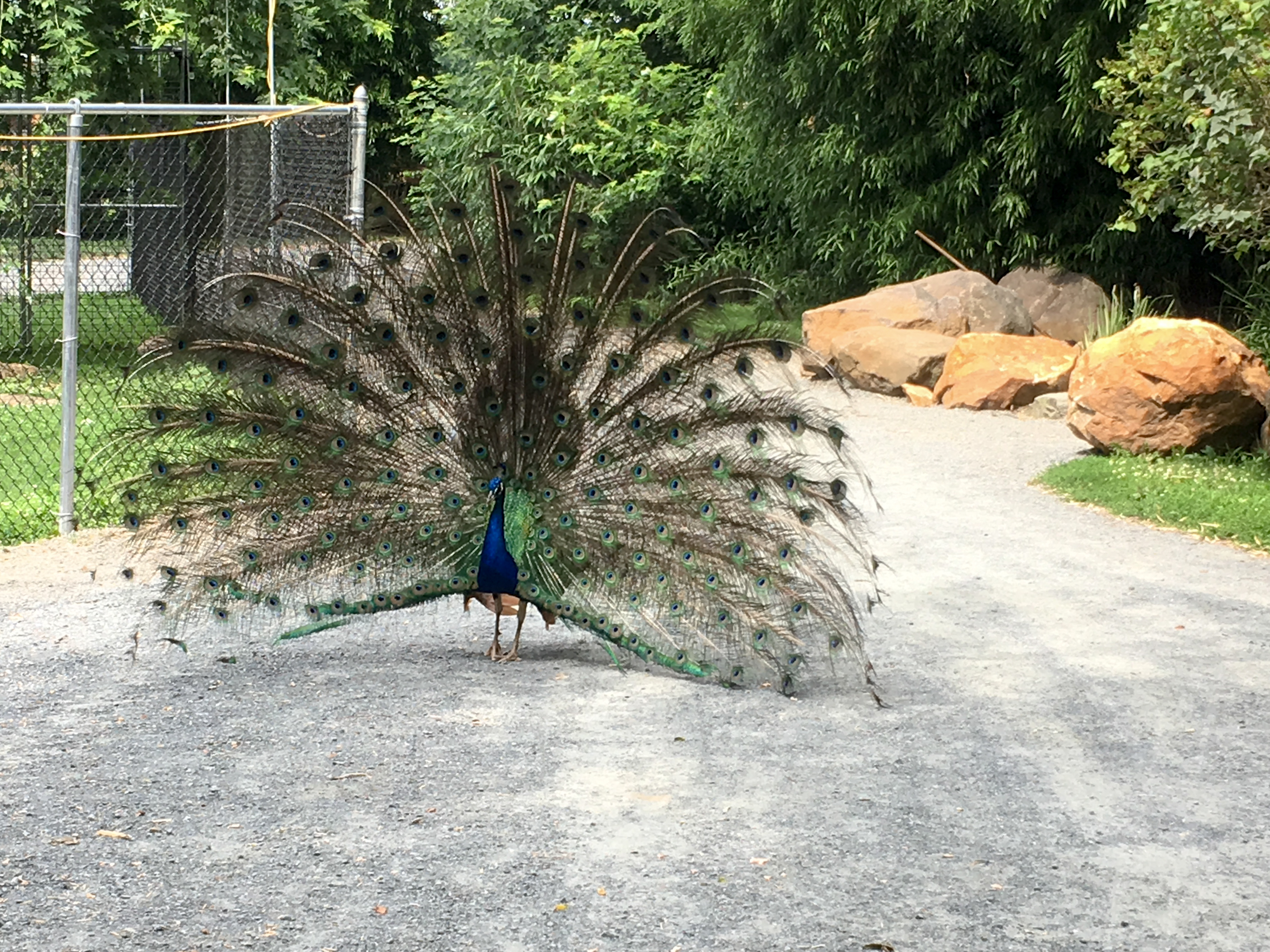
- A peacock at Plumpton Park Zoo
- Interactive map of Plumpton Park Zoo
- scale:2000 region:US 39°42′15.29″N 76°0′5.35″W
- Date opened: 1985
- Location: Rising Sun, Maryland, United States
- No. of animals: 180
- Website: www.plumptonparkzoo.org

The Plumpton Park Zoo is located in Rising Sun, Maryland, United States, along Maryland Route 273, which is part of the Mason and Dixon Scenic Byway. The Jeremiah Brown House and Mill Site, which is on the National Register of Historic Places, is also on the site.

The zoo was started by Edward Plumstead in 1985 on his family estate, initially with deer and a few domestic animals. Now the zoo is home to over 180 exotic animals of 60 different species and a professionally trained staff of zookeepers and professionals. The zoo welcomes over 85,000 visitors a year.

== List of animals ==
=== Mammals ===
• Alpaca • American bison • Crested porcupine • Serval • Arctic fox • Bactrian camel • Binturong • Black-backed jackal • American black bear • Bobcat • Continental Giant rabbit • Cougar • Eurasian brown bear • Fallow deer • Giraffe • Llama • Patagonian cavy • Pot-bellied pig • Prairie dog • Pygmy goat • Reeves's muntjac • Sheep • Siamang • Siberian tiger • Sicilian donkey • Bennett's wallaby • Arctic wolf • Ankole-Watusi • White tiger • White-faced capuchin • Zebra

=== Birds ===
• Barred owl • Blue-and-yellow macaw • Blue eared pheasant • Silkie chicken • Grey parrot • Domestic turkey • Duck • Goffin • Harris's hawk • Heritage turkey • Hyacinth macaw • Moluccan cockatoo • Peacock • Golden pheasant • Sandhill crane • Scarlet macaw • Silver pheasant • Sun conure • Umbrella cockatoo

=== Reptiles ===
• African spurred tortoise • American alligator • Ball python • Boa constrictor • Corn snake • Hermann's tortoise • Red-footed tortoise • Red-eared slider • Aldabra giant tortoise

=== Amphibians ===
• African bullfrog
