= Maryland Route 276 =

State highway in Maryland, United States

Maryland Route 276
- Maryland Route 276 highlighted in red

Route information
- Maintained by MDSHA
- Length: 7.85 mi (12.63 km)
- Existed: 1927–present

Major junctions
- South end: MD 222 in Port Deposit
- MD 275 in Woodlawn; MD 273 in Harrisville
- North end: US 1 near Harrisville

Location
- Country: United States
- State: Maryland
- Counties: Cecil

Highway system
- Maryland highway system; Interstate; US; State; Scenic Byways
← MD 275	→ MD 277

Maryland Route 276 (MD 276) is a state highway in the U.S. state of Maryland. Known for most of its length as Jacob Tome Memorial Highway, the highway runs 7.85 miles (12.63 km) from MD 222 in Port Deposit north to U.S. Route 1 (US 1) near Harrisville in western Cecil County. MD 276 connects Port Deposit with Rising Sun. MD 276 was constructed along an old turnpike from Port Deposit through Woodlawn, then north to Rising Sun to the east of the present corridor. The Woodlawn–Rising Sun piece was paved by 1910; the Port Deposit–Woodlawn stretch was paved in the late 1920s and early 1930s. MD 276 was shifted west to between Woodlawn and its present northern terminus at US 1 in the late 1950s. The highway was completely reconstructed between 1959 and 1965.

== Route description ==
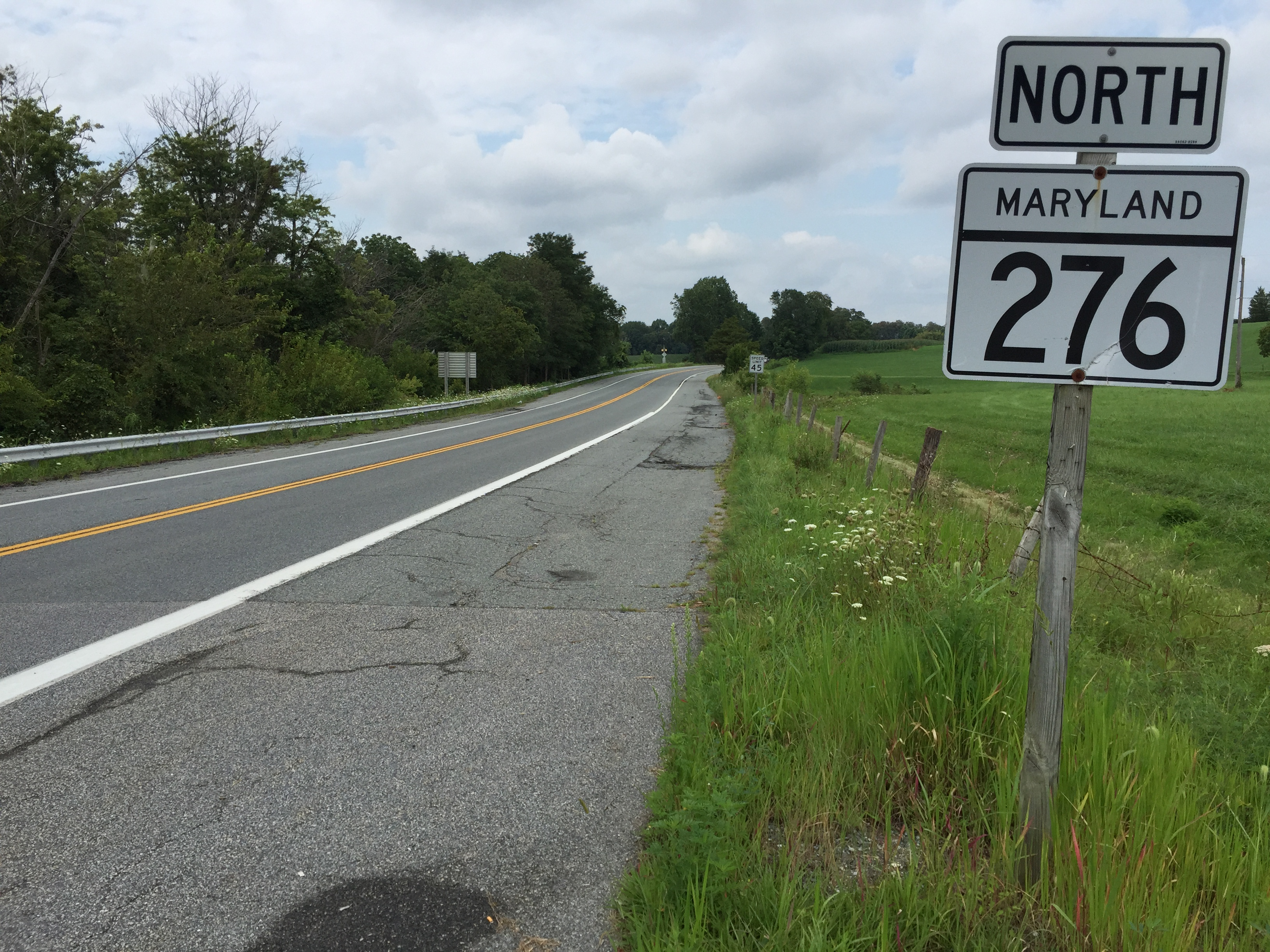
View north along MD 276 at MD 273 in Harrisville

MD 276 begins at an intersection with MD 222 (Main Street) opposite Ferry Street in the town of Port Deposit two blocks east of the Susquehanna River. The two-lane undivided state highway, which is Center Street in town and becomes Jacob Tome Memorial Highway at the town limit, which the route follows northeast as it ascends the high bluff above the river. MD 276 follows the town limit along the northwestern edge of the property of former United States Naval Training Center Bainbridge, until shortly before its intersection with the northern terminus of MD 275 (Perrylawn Drive). The highway continues northeast to the hamlet of Woodlawn, where it curves north at Hopewell Road. MD 276 crosses several branches of Basin Run and briefly parallels Sale Barn Road before reaching the hamlet of West Nottingham, where the route passes to the east of the West Nottingham Academy Historic District and the namesake boarding school. The highway parallels Harrisville Road, which provides access to West Nottingham Meetinghouse, between Barnes Corner Road and MD 273 (Rising Sun Road). The two state highways meet at a roundabout in Harrisville, which is west of the town of Rising Sun. MD 276 continues north a short distance to its northern terminus at US 1 (Rising Sun Bypass) opposite Slicers Mill Road.

MD 276 is a part of the National Highway System as a principal arterial from near Waibel Road to Hopewell Road within Woodlawn. The highway was named for Jacob Tome, a lumber magnate, state senator, and philanthropist in Port Deposit in the 19th century. MD 276 was designated Jacob Tome Memorial Highway by the Maryland State Roads Commission on May 24, 1961, based on a 1961 joint resolution of the Maryland General Assembly.

== History ==
The portion of MD 276 from Port Deposit to Woodlawn follows the path of the Old Baltimore and Philadelphia Turnpike, a collection of free and toll roads that passed through Cecil County from a ferry crossing at Port Deposit northeast through Calvert to Chester County, Pennsylvania. The connection between the turnpike and Rising Sun was east of modern MD 276 along Hopewell Road, which was paved as a macadam road from the turnpike intersection east of Woodlawn at Cathers Corner to Rising Sun by Cecil County with state aid by 1910. Wilson Avenue in Rising Sun and the highway adjacent to the town were reconstructed as a concrete road to eliminate a steep grade in 1926. That same year, work began on paving the highway from Port Deposit to Cathers Corner. A section of the highway between the two endpoints near but not in Port Deposit was paved as a concrete road in 1926. The Port Deposit end of the highway was completed in 1929. The gap in MD 276 between the concrete segment west of Woodlawn and Cathers Corner was filled between 1930 and 1933.

MD 276 was relocated to the west through a May 8, 1958, road transfer agreement between the Maryland State Roads Commission and Cecil County. The agreement transferred Hopewell Road from Cathers Corner to the town limit of Rising Sun from state to county maintenance in exchange for Kelly Road from Woodlawn north to the Rising Sun Bypass being transferred from the county to the state. Wilson Avenue in Rising Sun remained in the state highway system, as MD 811, until it was transferred to the town by a January 5, 1979, agreement. Shortly after the 1958 transfer, MD 276 was reconstructed over its entire length. The highway from Port Deposit to the Kelly Road intersection in Woodlawn was reconstructed in 1959 and 1960. MD 276 from Woodlawn to Liberty Grove Road, then MD 269, was reconstructed in 1962 and 1963, with much of the highway being relocated from what are now Sale Barn Road and Harrisville Road. The highway was relocated from Barnes Corner to MD 273 at Harrisville, bypassing the rest of Harrisville Road, in 1963 and 1964. Finally, MD 276 was reconstructed in place between MD 273 and US 1 in 1964 and 1965. The bypassed sections of MD 276 became segments of MD 813. The MD 276–MD 273 intersection was reconstructed as a roundabout in 2002 and 2003.

== Junction list ==
The entire route is in Cecil County.

Location	mi	km	Destinations	Notes
Port Deposit	0.00	0.00	MD 222 (Main Street) to I-95 – Perryville, Conowingo	Southern terminus
Woodlawn	2.25	3.62	MD 275 south (Perrylawn Drive) to I-95 / US 40 – Perryville	Northern terminus of MD 275
Harrisville	7.36	11.84	MD 273 (Rising Sun Road) – Harrisville, Rising Sun	Roundabout
Harrisville	7.85	12.63	US 1 (Rising Sun Bypass) to US 222 north – Lancaster, Baltimore, Philadelphia	Northern terminus
1.000 mi = 1.609 km; 1.000 km = 0.621 mi
