= Fair Hill, Maryland =

Unincorporated community in Maryland, United States

- Unincorporated community
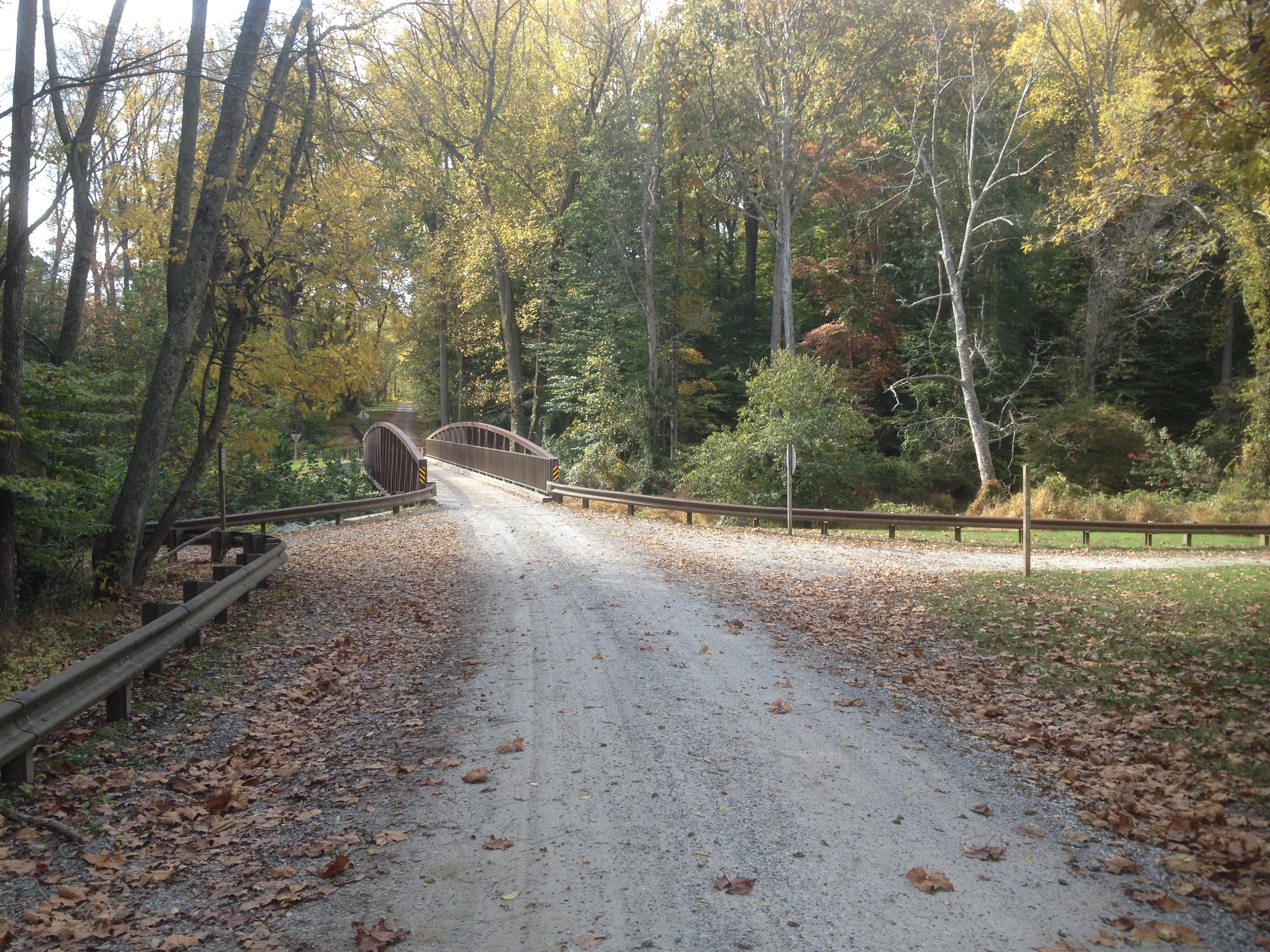

- Location within the State of Maryland Fair Hill (the United States)
- Coordinates: 39°42′08″N 75°52′05″W
- Country: United States
- State: Maryland
- County: Cecil
- Time zone: UTC-5 (Eastern (EST))
  - Summer (DST): UTC-4 (EDT)
- GNIS feature ID: 584314

Fair Hill is an unincorporated community in Cecil County, Maryland, United States. Fair Hill is located at the intersection of Maryland routes 213 and 273, north of Elkton. It is home to the Fair Hill Natural Resources Management Area, a 5,613 acre protected area formerly part of the land holdings of William duPont, Jr.

The community is also supported by Fair Hill Training Center a horse-racing track. Venue renovations began in 2018, which were assisted by the Maryland Stadium Authority and have since been completed. Fair Hill is the site of the Maryland 5 Star CCI 5*-L eventing. It has been held there since 2021. Fair Hill is also home to the Cecil County Fair.
