= Jeremiah Brown House and Mill Site =

Historic house in Maryland, United States

- U.S. National Register of Historic Places
- U.S. Historic district
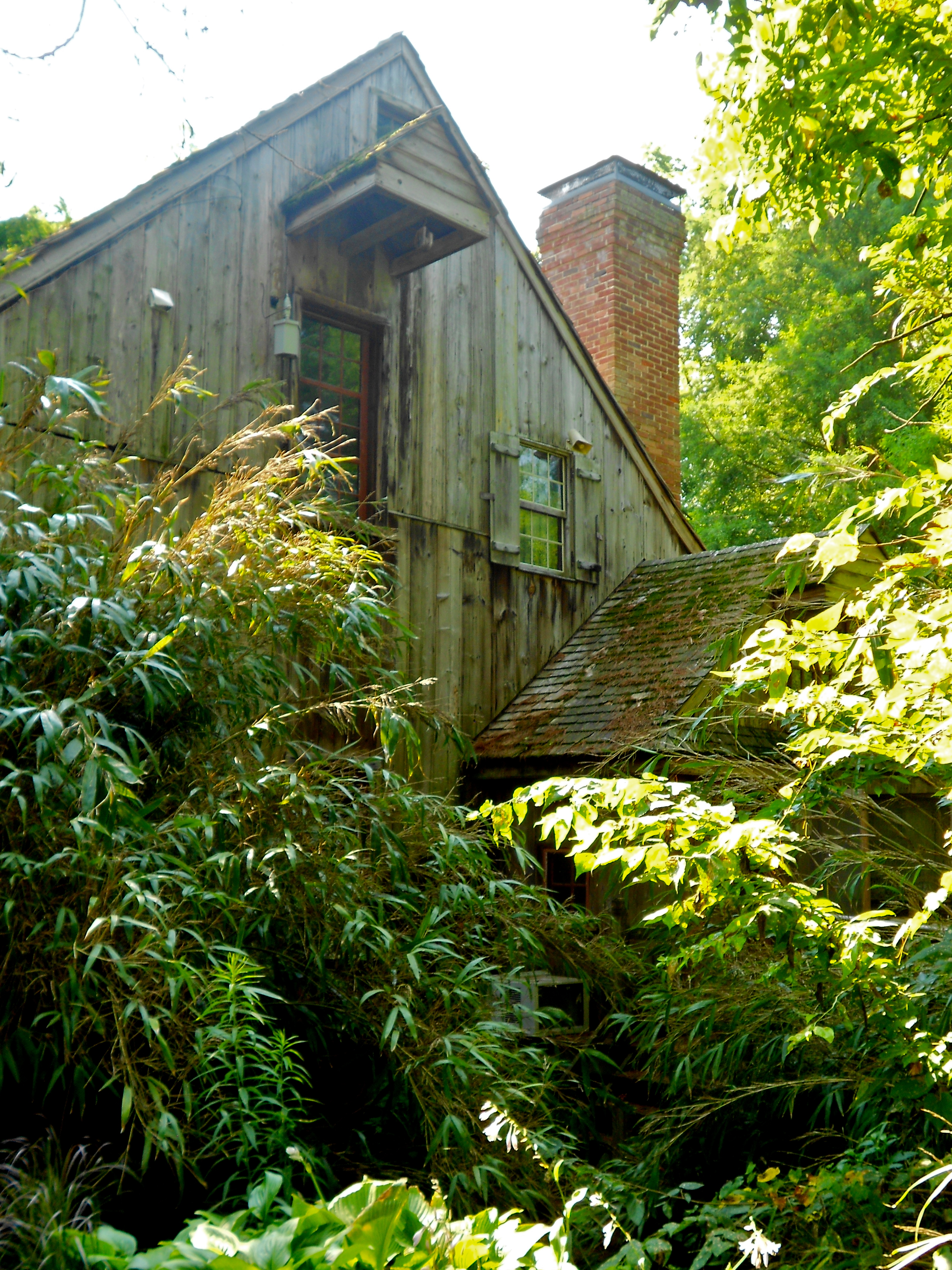
- Jeremiah Brown Hill, July 2013

- Location within Maryland Location within the United States
- Location: 1416 Telegraph Rd., Rising Sun, Maryland
- Coordinates: 39°42′13″N 76°0′15″W
- Area: 30 acres (12 ha)
- Built: 1734
- Built by: Brown, Jeremiah, Sr.; Reese, Morris
- NRHP reference No.: 87001391
- Added to NRHP: November 2, 1987

Jeremiah Brown House and Mill Site is a Colonial-era mill complex and national historic district at Rising Sun, Cecil County, Maryland, United States. It consists of two distinct halves: a two-story, three-bay, gable-roofed stone structure built in 1757 by Jeremiah Brown Sr., a Quaker from Pennsylvania; and a two-story, two-bay gable-roofed frame house built in 1904 by John Clayton on the site of the original 1702 log wing. Also on the property is a small 19th century bank barn; a reconstruction of the original mill built on top of the stone foundations of the 1734 Brown Water Corn and Gristmill; and the foundations of an 18th-century saw mill.

It was added to the National Register of Historic Places in 1987. The entire site is located within the grounds of the Plumpton Park Zoo.
