= Nathan and Susannah Harris House =

Historic house in Maryland, United States

- U.S. National Register of Historic Places
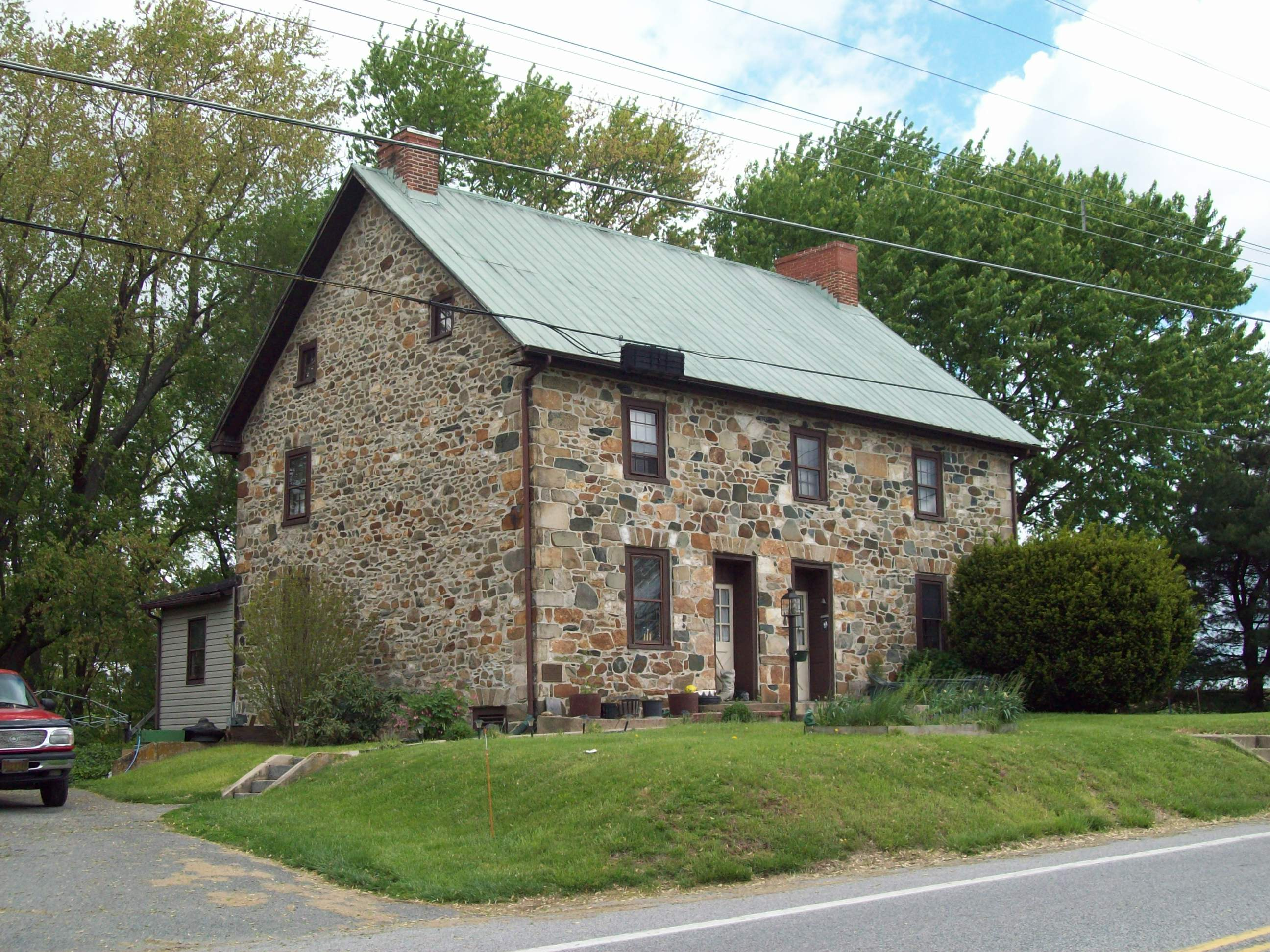
- Nathan and Susannah Harris House, April 2010

- Location within Maryland Location within the United States
- Location: 541 Rising Sun Rd., Harrisville, Maryland
- Coordinates: 39°41′45″N 76°4′53″W
- Area: 0.7 acres (0.28 ha)
- Built: 1798
- Built by: Harris, Robert
- NRHP reference No.: 84001602
- Added to NRHP: March 22, 1984

The Nathan and Susannah Harris House is a historic home in Harrisville, Cecil County, Maryland, United States. It is a large two-story-high, four-bay-wide by two-room-deep, stone dwelling constructed in 1798. The house is representative of the expansion during the 18th century of the Quaker community called the Nottingham Lots.

The Nathan and Susannah Harris House was listed on the National Register of Historic Places in 1984.
