= East Nottingham Friends Meetinghouse =

Historic church in Maryland, United States

- U.S. National Register of Historic Places
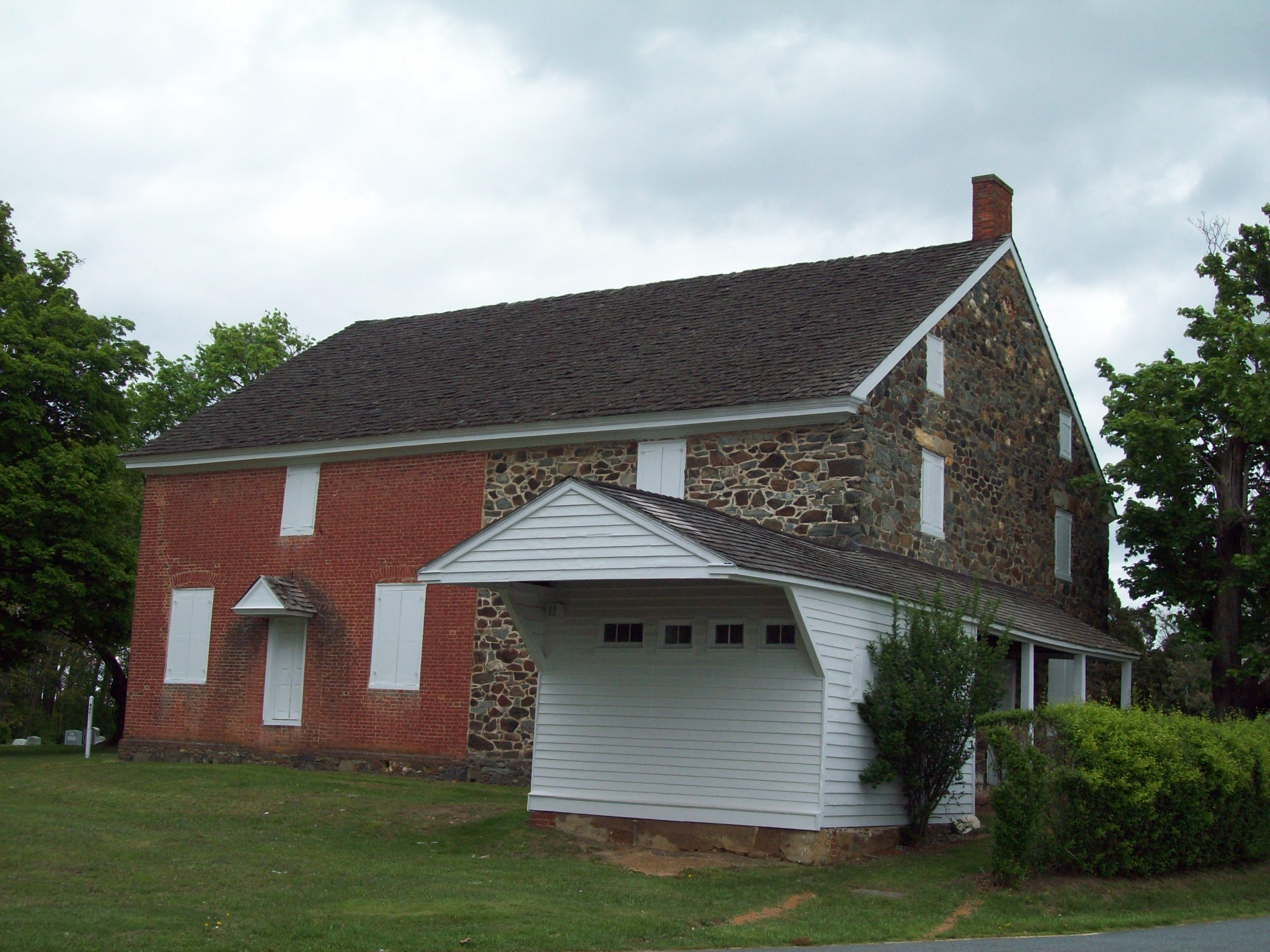
- East Nottingham Friends Meetinghouse, April 2010

- Location within Maryland Location within the United States
- Location: Brick Meetinghouse Road, Rising Sun, Maryland
- Coordinates: 39°42′4″N 75°59′0″W
- Area: 40 acres (16 ha)
- Built: 1724
- NRHP reference No.: 77000691
- Added to NRHP: August 19, 1977

East Nottingham Meetinghouse, or Brick Meetinghouse, is a historic Friends meeting house located at Rising Sun, Cecil County, Maryland. It consists of three different sections: the Flemish bond brick section is the oldest, having been built in 1724, 30 feet 3 inches (9.22 m) by 40 feet 2 inches (12.24 m); the stone addition containing two one-story meeting rooms on the ground floor, each with a corner fireplace at the south corners of the building, and a large youth gallery on the second floor; and in the mid 19th century, a one-story gable roofed structure was added at the southwest corner of the stone section to serve as a women's cloakroom and privy. It is of significance because of its association with William Penn who granted the site "for a Meeting House and Burial Yard, Forever" near the center of the 18,000-acre (73 km^{2}) Nottingham Lots settlement and was at one time the largest Friends meeting house south of Philadelphia. The Philadelphia Half-Yearly Meeting was held here as early as 1725. During the Revolutionary War, an American Army hospital was established here in 1778 for sick and wounded troops under General William Smallwood's command and the Marquis de Lafayette's troops camped in the Meeting House woods on the first night of their march from the Head of Elk to victory at the Battle of Yorktown in 1781.

It was listed on the National Register of Historic Places in 1977.
