= Cecil College =

Community college in North East, Maryland, US

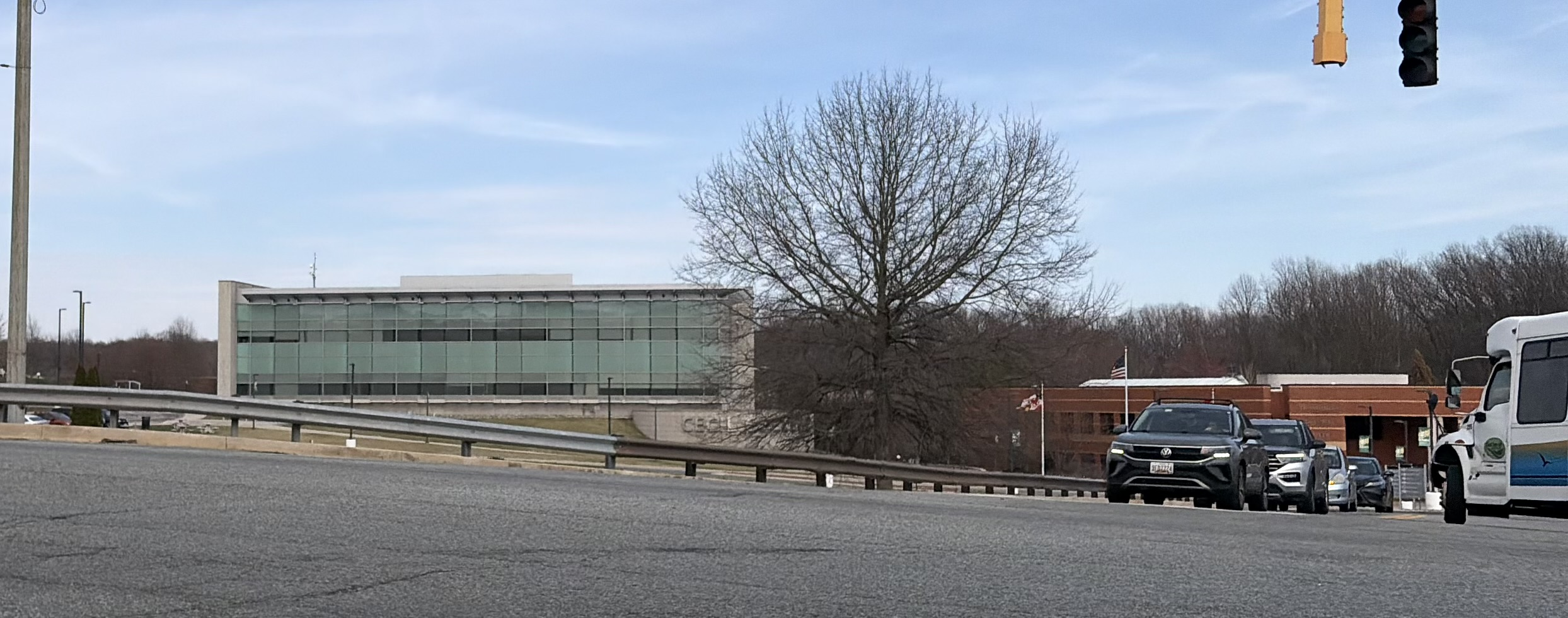
- Entrance to Cecil College
- Former name: Cecil Community College
- Type: Public college
- Established: 1968
- President: Mary Way Bolt
- Location: North East, Maryland, United States; 39°38′29″N 75°57′23″W
- Campus: Rural
- Sporting affiliations: National Junior College Athletic Association Maryland Junior College Athletic Conference
- Mascot: Seahawk
- Website: www.cecil.edu

Cecil College is a public community college in North East, Maryland in Cecil County.

== History ==
Cecil College was founded in 1968 to meet the educational needs of Cecil County residents. On June 13, 2007, the Maryland Higher Education Commission voted to accept its petition to change its name to Cecil College.

== Organization ==
Cecil College is governed by a board of trustees appointed by the governor of the state of Maryland. The president reports directly to the board of trustees.

== Academics ==
Cecil College is a member of the Maryland Association of Community Colleges, accredited by the Middle States Commission on Higher Education, and authorized by the Maryland Higher Education Commission to grant the associate degree. Nursing programs at Cecil College are accredited by the Maryland State Board of Nursing and the National League for Nursing Accrediting Commission. The college also conducts transportation and logistics programs.

== Notable alumni ==
- Kevin Palmer - basketball player
