= North East River =

Tributary of Chesapeake Bay in Maryland

Coordinates: 39°33′N 75°59′W

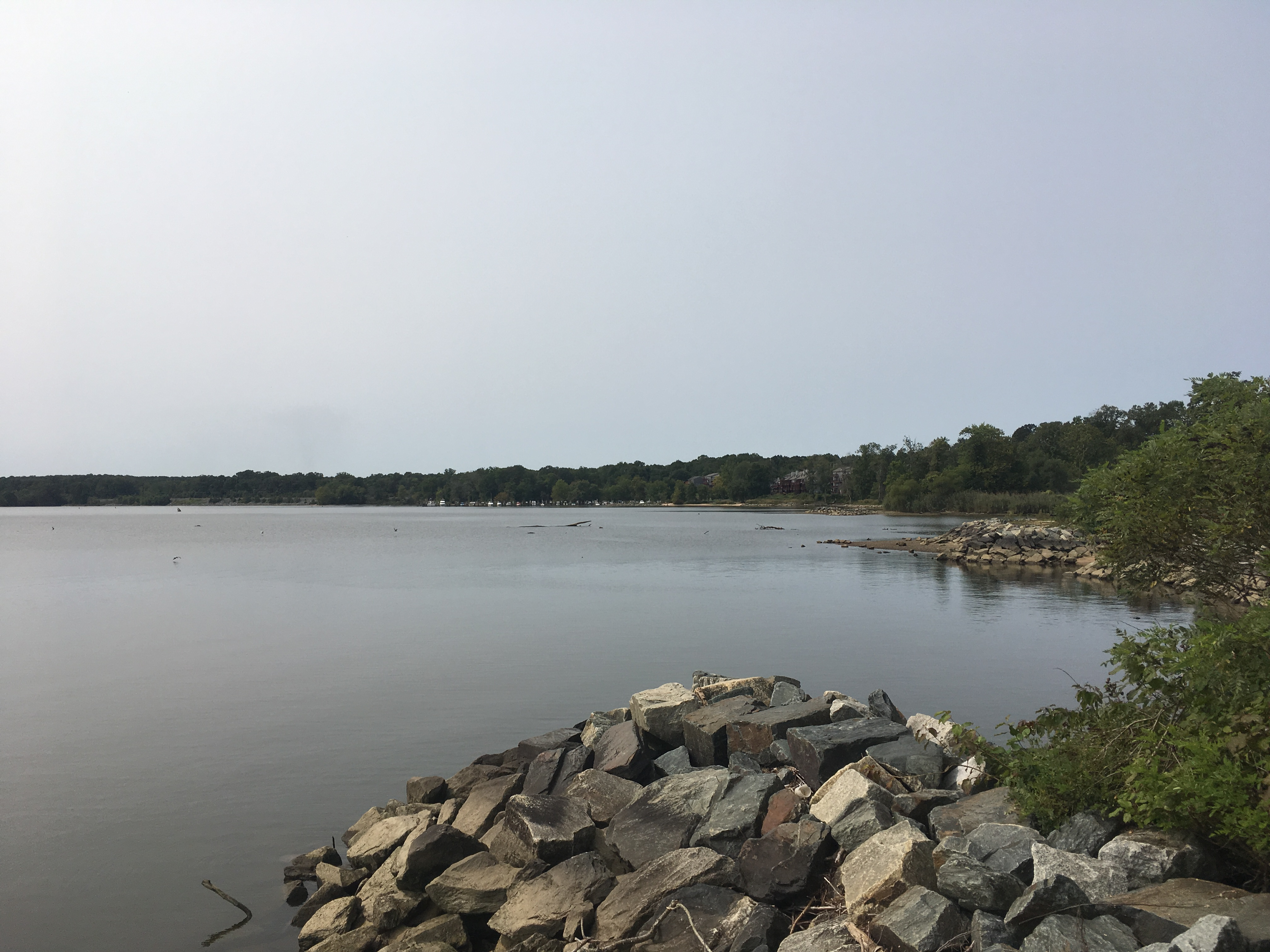
North East River from North East, Maryland

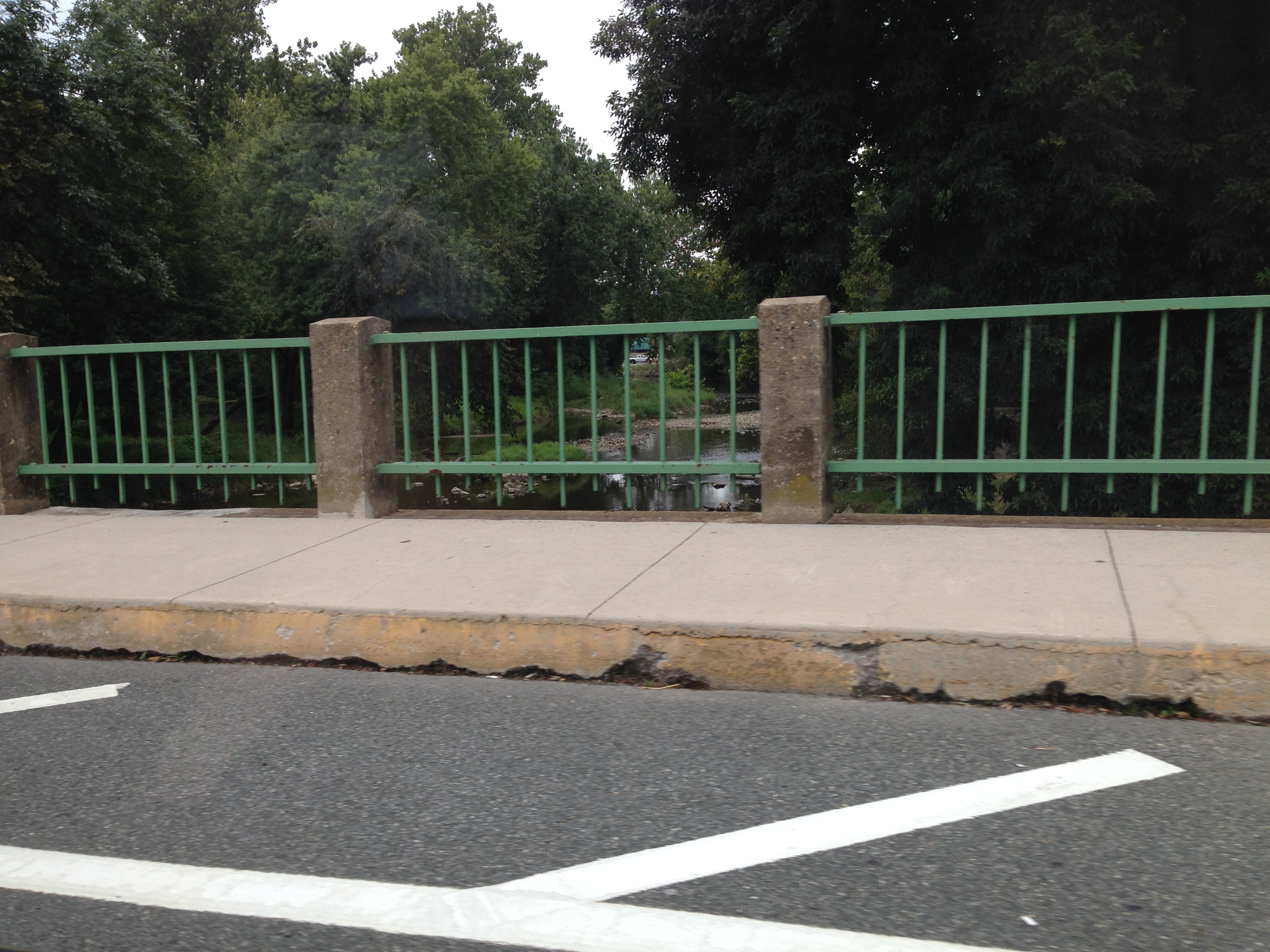
North East Creek near North East, Maryland from a bridge.

The North East River is a tributary of the Chesapeake Bay in Maryland. Entirely tidal, it extends for about 5.0 miles (8.0 km) from the town of North East southwest past Charlestown to the main body of Chesapeake Bay between Carpenter's Point and Red Point. The river is fed by North East Creek and its tributaries, which reach as far north as just east of Nottingham, Pennsylvania. The Northeast River is entirely within Cecil County, Maryland, though its watershed extends into Chester County, Pennsylvania. Its watershed area in MD (excluding water) is 63 square miles (160 km^{2}), with 6% impervious surface in 1994. On the 1612 John Smith map, it was referred to as Gunter's Harbour.
