= North East, Maryland =

- Town
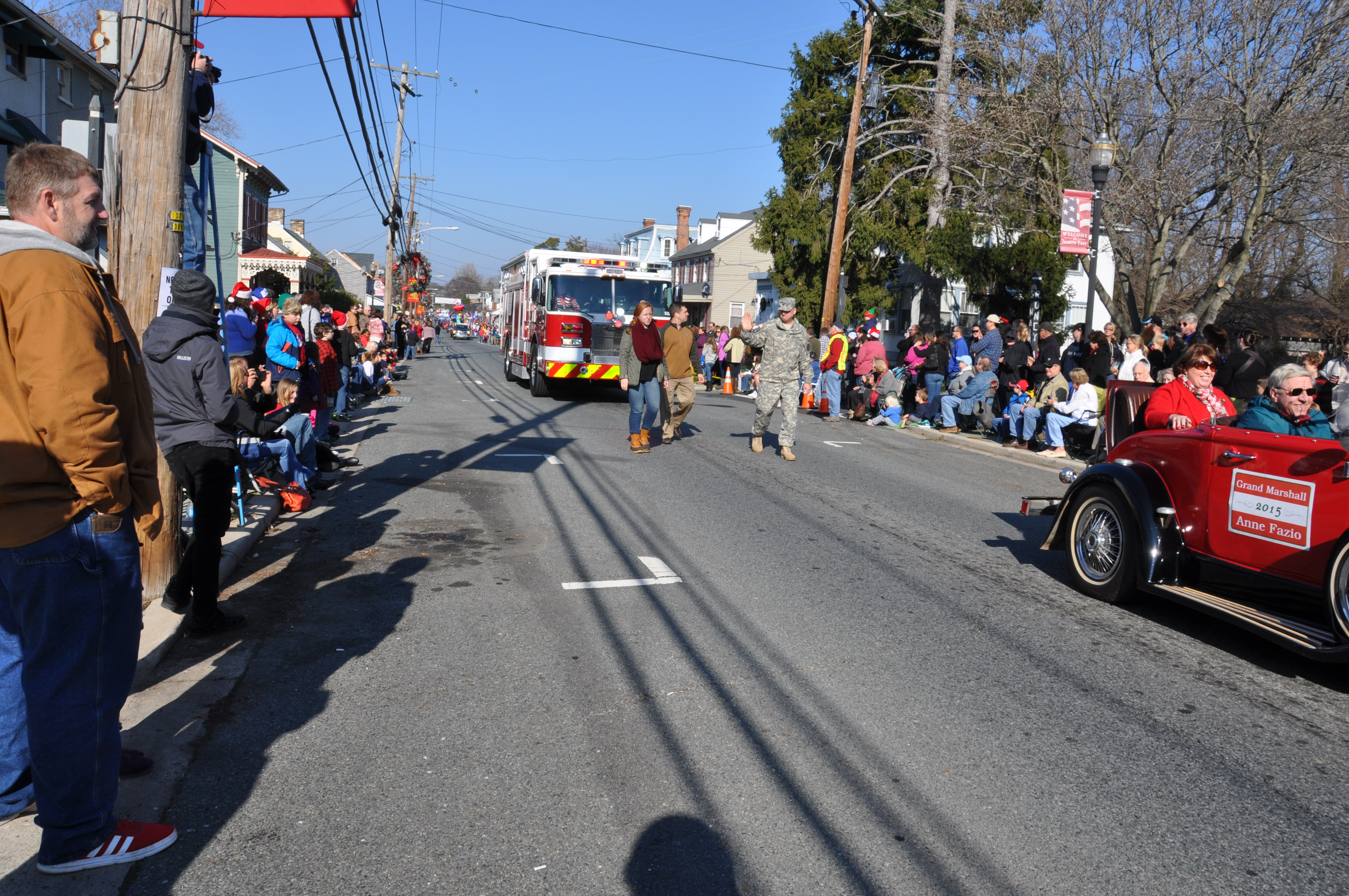

- Flag Seal

- Location of North East, Maryland
- Coordinates: 39°36′1″N 75°56′32″W
- Country: United States
- State: Maryland
- County: Cecil
- Settled: 1658
- Incorporated: 1850

Government
  - Mayor: Kelly Benson

Area
  - Total: 2.08 sq mi (5.38 km^{2})
  - Land: 2.04 sq mi (5.29 km^{2})
  - Water: 0.035 sq mi (0.09 km^{2})
- Elevation: 16 ft (5 m)

Population (2020)
  - Total: 4,085
  - Density: 2,001.3/sq mi (772.71/km^{2})
- Time zone: UTC-5 (Eastern (EST))
  - Summer (DST): UTC-4 (EDT)
- ZIP code: 21901
- Area code: 410
- FIPS code: 24-56450
- GNIS feature ID: 0586223
- Website: http://www.northeastmd.org/

North East is a town in Cecil County, Maryland, United States. It is located between Philadelphia and Baltimore. As of the 2020 census, North East had a population of 4,085.

The Turkey Point Light Station was listed on the National Register of Historic Places in 2002. The Gilpin's Falls Covered Bridge was listed in 2008.

== Geography ==
North East is located at 39°36′01″N 75°56′32″W.

According to the United States Census Bureau, the town has a total area of 2.11 square miles (5.46 km^{2}), of which 2.06 square miles (5.34 km^{2}) is land and 0.05 square miles (0.13 km^{2}) is water.

== Demographics ==
Historical population
Census	Pop.	Note	%±
1850	338		—
1870	748		—
1880	988		32.1%
1890	1,249		26.4%
1900	969		−22.4%
1910	974		0.5%
1920	1,112		14.2%
1930	1,412		27.0%
1940	1,328		−5.9%
1950	1,517		14.2%
1960	1,628		7.3%
1970	1,818		11.7%
1980	1,469		−19.2%
1990	1,913		30.2%
2000	2,733		42.9%
2010	3,572		30.7%
2020	4,085		14.4%
U.S. Decennial Census

=== 2020 census ===
As of the 2020 census, North East had a population of 4,085. The median age was 33.8 years. 27.0% of residents were under the age of 18 and 11.6% of residents were 65 years of age or older. For every 100 females there were 91.1 males, and for every 100 females age 18 and over there were 87.4 males age 18 and over.

100.0% of residents lived in urban areas, while 0.0% lived in rural areas.

There were 1,637 households in North East, of which 36.7% had children under the age of 18 living in them. Of all households, 33.0% were married-couple households, 20.9% were households with a male householder and no spouse or partner present, and 34.4% were households with a female householder and no spouse or partner present. About 31.9% of all households were made up of individuals and 11.7% had someone living alone who was 65 years of age or older.

There were 1,856 housing units, of which 11.8% were vacant. The homeowner vacancy rate was 2.7% and the rental vacancy rate was 4.7%.

Racial composition as of the 2020 census
Race	Number	Percent
White	3,018	73.9%
Black or African American	453	11.1%
American Indian and Alaska Native	11	0.3%
Asian	74	1.8%
Native Hawaiian and Other Pacific Islander	3	0.1%
Some other race	108	2.6%
Two or more races	418	10.2%
Hispanic or Latino (of any race)	304	7.4%

=== 2010 census ===
As of the census of 2010, there were 3,572 people, 1,433 households, and 901 families living in the town. The population density was 1,734.0 inhabitants per square mile (669.5/km^{2}). There were 1,651 housing units at an average density of 801.5 per square mile (309.5/km^{2}). The racial makeup of the town was 87.2% White, 7.6% African American, 0.4% Native American, 1.5% Asian, 1.0% from other races, and 2.4% from two or more races. Hispanic or Latino of any race were 3.3% of the population.

There were 1,433 households, of which 38.3% had children under the age of 18 living with them, 38.0% were married couples living together, 17.4% had a female householder with no husband present, 7.4% had a male householder with no wife present, and 37.1% were non-families. 29.6% of all households were made up of individuals, and 9.4% had someone living alone who was 65 years of age or older. The average household size was 2.49 and the average family size was 3.03.

The median age in the town was 30.7 years. 26.7% of residents were under the age of 18; 11% were between the ages of 18 and 24; 31.1% were from 25 to 44; 22.1% were from 45 to 64; and 9.2% were 65 years of age or older. The gender makeup of the town was 47.7% male and 52.3% female.

=== 2000 census ===
As of the census of 2000, there were 2,733 people, 1,081 households, and 701 families living in the town. The population density was 1,730.8 inhabitants per square mile (668.3/km^{2}). There were 1,215 housing units at an average density of 769.5 per square mile (297.1/km^{2}). The racial makeup of the town was 93.82% White, 3.18% African American, 0.40% Native American, 0.88% Asian, 0.44% from other races, and 1.28% from two or more races. Hispanic or Latino of any race were 1.54% of the population.

There were 1,081 households, out of which 36.4% had children under the age of 18 living with them, 42.4% were married couples living together, 16.7% had a female householder with no husband present, and 35.1% were non-families. 27.8% of all households were made up of individuals, and 10.5% had someone living alone who was 65 years of age or older. The average household size was 2.52 and the average family size was 3.04.

In the town, the population was spread out, with 29.2% under the age of 18, 10.1% from 18 to 24, 31.7% from 25 to 44, 18.3% from 45 to 64, and 10.7% who were 65 years of age or older. The median age was 31 years. For every 100 females, there were 91.7 males. For every 100 females age 18 and over, there were 87.9 males.

The median income for a household in the town was $39,563, and the median income for a family was $39,417. Males had a median income of $34,545 versus $26,768 for females. The per capita income for the town was $18,287. About 14.9% of families and 15.2% of the population were below the poverty line, including 19.4% of those under age 18 and 14.1% of those age 65 or over.

== Education ==
It is within Cecil County Public Schools.

- North East Elementary School
- North East Middle School
- North East High School
- Cecil School of Technology

Private:

- The Tome School (K-12)

Tertiary:

- Cecil College

== Transportation ==
=== Roads and highways ===
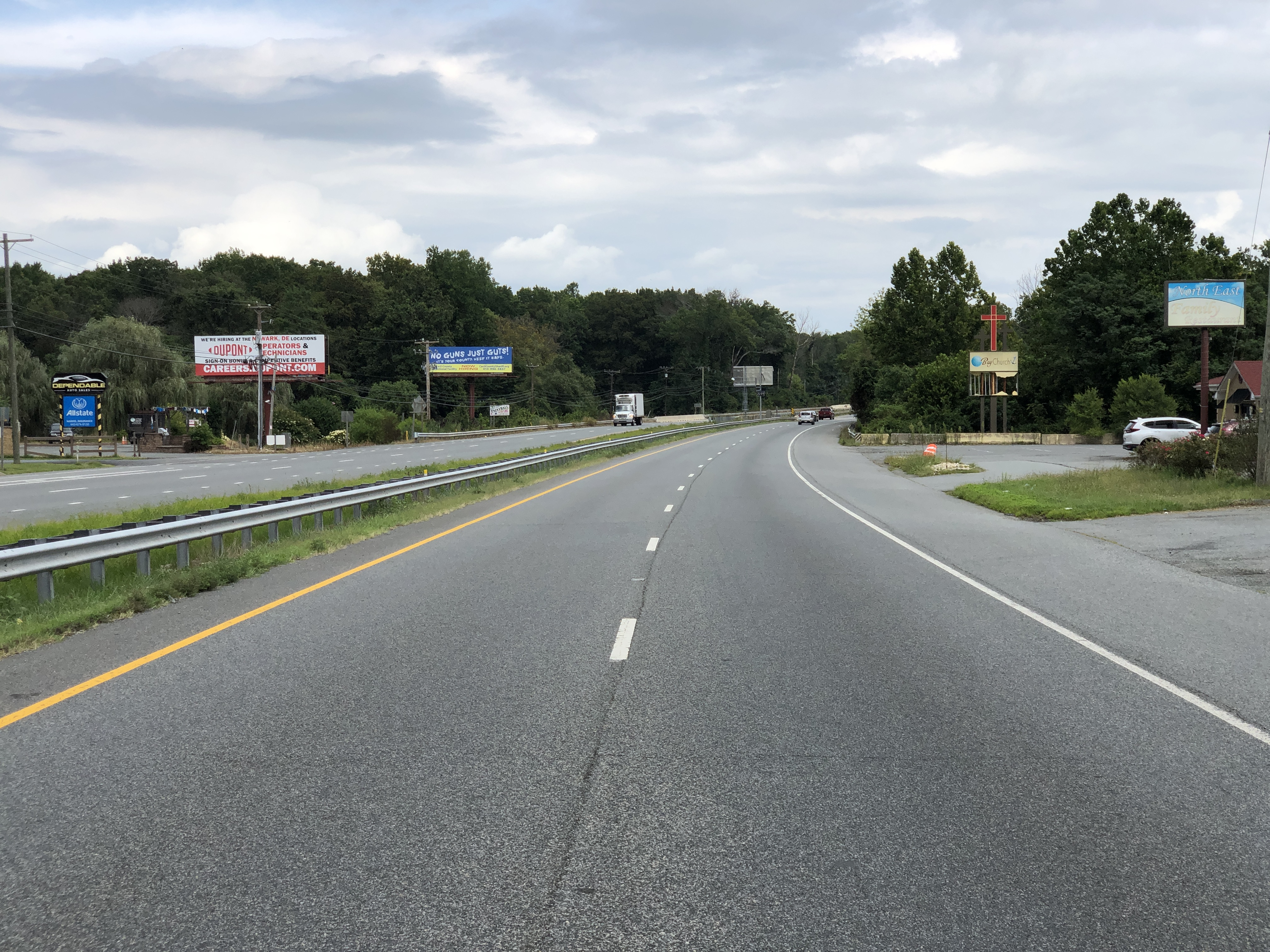
US 40 eastbound past MD 272 in North East

U.S. Route 40 is the main east–west road directly serving North East. It passes through a thin stretch of town on the north side via Pulaski Highway, providing connections east to Elkton and west to Perryville. Maryland Route 272 is the main north–south road through North East, passing through the center of town along the one-way pair of Mauldin Avenue northbound and Main Street southbound. Outside of the town, MD 272 heads south as Turkey Point Road to Elk Neck State Park and north as North East Road to Chester County, Pennsylvania.

Interstate 95 is the closest Interstate highway, passing just north of the town limits. It is accessible via an interchange with MD 272, from which point it heads south toward Baltimore and Washington, D.C. and north toward Wilmington and Philadelphia.

=== Public transportation ===
The Route 2 Cross-County Connection bus operated by Cecil Transit runs between Elkton, North East, Cecil College, Perryville (town and the Perryville station along MARC's Penn Line) and Perry Point Veteran's Medical Center.

== Historic sites ==
Historic sites in and near North East include:

- St. Mary Anne's Episcopal Church, built in 1742
- Turkey Point Light
- Gilpin's Falls Covered Bridge

== Notable people ==
- Harry Anderson (September 10, 1931 – June 11, 1998), former MLB player
- George A. Palmer (February 14, 1895 – January 11, 1981), founder of the Sandy Cove Conference Center
