= Flying camp =

In military strategy, a flying camp, or camp-volant, was a small but strong army of cavalry and dragoons, to which were sometimes added foot soldiers. Such an army was usually commanded by a lieutenant general, and was always in motion, both to cover the garrisons in possession, and to keep the adversary in continual alarm.

== See also ==
- Flying Camp, for the American use of the concept in 1776
