= Senator Posey =

Senator Posey may refer to:

- Adrian Posey (1857–1922), Maryland State Senate
- Bill Posey (born 1947), Florida State Senate
- Thomas Posey (1750–1818), Louisiana State Senate
