= Thomas Ewing (disambiguation) =

Thomas Ewing (1789–1871) was a U.S. politician.

Thomas Ewing may also refer to:

- Thomas Ewing (American Revolution) (1730–1790), battalion commander in the Maryland Flying Camp during the American Revolutionary War
- Thomas Ewing Jr. (1829–1896), his son, U.S. politician
- Thomas Ewing (Australian politician) (1856–1920)
- Thomas W. Ewing (born 1935), U.S. politician
- Thomas Ewing III (1862–1942), Commissioner of the U.S. Patent Office
- Tommy Ewing (born 1937), Scottish footballer

== See also ==
- Thomas Ewing Sherman (1856–1933), American lawyer, educator, and Catholic priest
