= Port Tobacco Times =

Defunct newspaper in Maryland, US

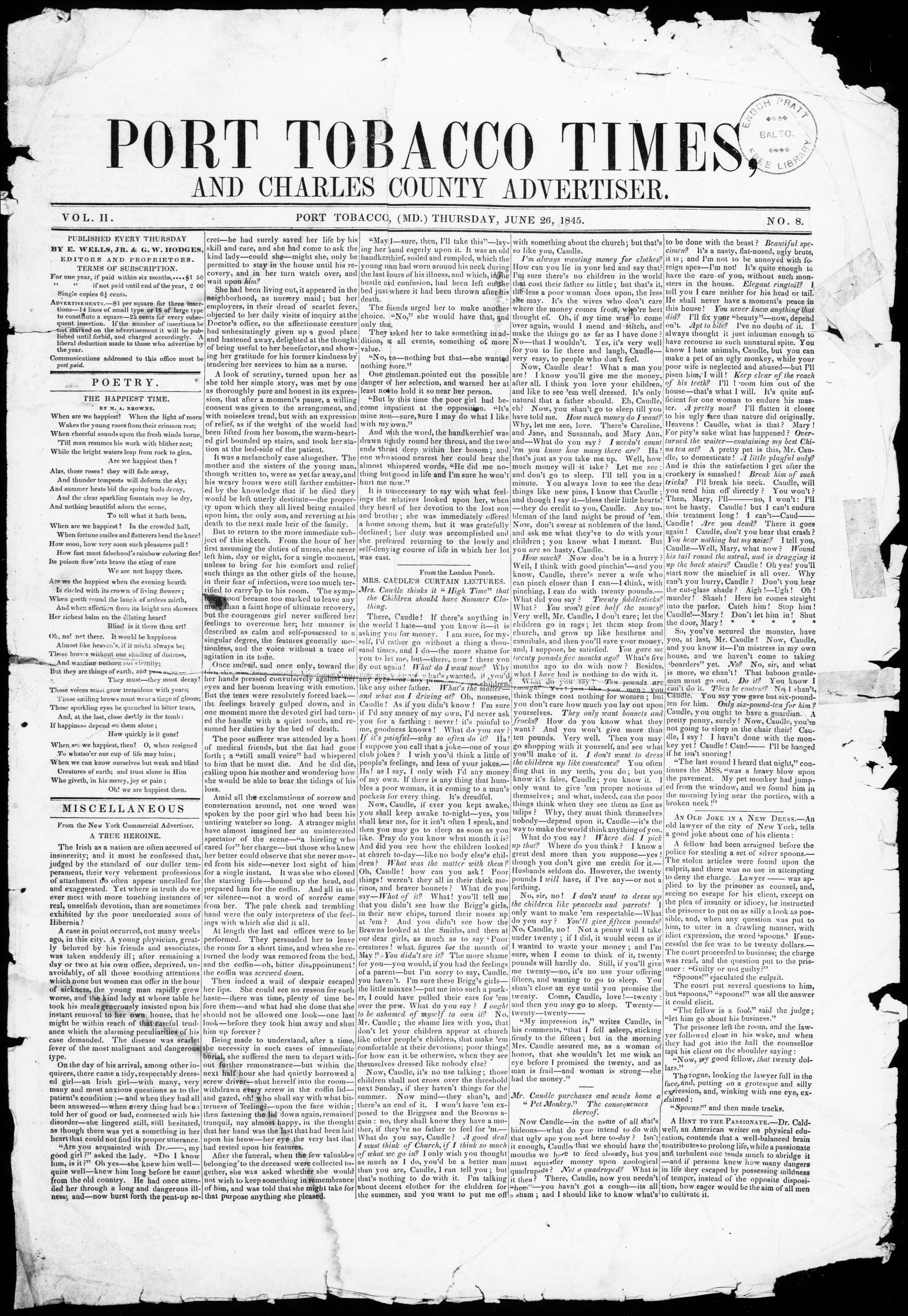
- The cover page for the June 26, 1845 issue
- Type: Weekly newspaper
- Founder(s): Elijah Wells Jr. & G. W. Hodges
- Editor: Elijah Wells Jr. (1844-1877), Cox & Daley (1877-1889), F. Marcellus Cox (1889-1898)
- Founded: 1844
- Ceased publication: 1898
- Relaunched: Times Crescent
- Political alignment: Democrat
- Language: English
- Headquarters: Port Tobacco, Maryland
- OCLC number: 9717061

The Port Tobacco Times was a newspaper published from 1844 to January 14, 1898 in Port Tobacco, Charles County, Maryland. It was founded as a Democratic newspaper by Elijah Wells Jr. and G. W. Hodges. In 1845, the name of the paper was changed to the Port Tobacco Times and Charles County Advertiser but retained its original founders as editors and publishers. When Union troops were stationed in Port Tobacco at the start of the American Civil War in 1861, Wells had to reassure alarmed pro-Confederate readers that the Times had not been seized by Union soldiers - rather, he had only allowed the soldiers to borrow his printing equipment to publish a newspaper for the troops stationed nearby. The Times published an editorial, entitled "Our Situation," in response:

“The State of Maryland has cast her vote for the Union and Government by the largest majority ever known to this State… Charles County then stands before the Government and the world this day a loyal county. Charles County has ever been loyal; we challenge a disloyal act to be laid at her door - and yet what is her condition? As a loyal county and State, obedient to the recognized law, faithful to the Constitution, the citizens of this State have a right, and undisputed right to protection in their person and property. Twenty thousand Federal troops are stationed upon the soil of Charles County, their camps extending from Mattawoman Creek to Liverpool Point. These troops are here ‘For our protection,’ we are told; ‘to protect us form the Rebels,’ and yet, in fact, we are exposed to more danger, to more losses and damage or at least as much as if these very Rebels were here. Our farmers are deprived of their provender to such extent that their cattle must die. Our citizens are deprived of homes almost; and fencers, farms, and field falls prey to the ruthless hands of those very friends who come here to protect us. “Our negroes, - ah, this is the point, - our negroes - are taken from us time and again, with no remuneration and the threats of violence if we seek to recover them.””

After Wells died in 1877, his son Samuel O. Wells ran the paper for a short time before handing it off to his cousin, Charles F. Daley, in 1880. Daley and his partner, F. Marcellus Cox, ran the paper together until 1889, when Daley left Port Tobacco to pursue other opportunities. A competitor newspaper, the Maryland Independent, was begun in Port Tobacco in 1874, and its editor, Adrian Posey, narrowly averted a duel with Cox over comments published during the 1884 presidential election.

The Pope's Creek Branch of the Pennsylvania Railroad arrived in Charles County in 1873, leading to the rise of new commercial centers near Port Tobacco, such as La Plata. An 1890 proposal to move the county seat from Port Tobacco to La Plata became a subject of local controversy, particularly when Times editor F. Marcellus Cox led a petition against moving the courthouse. Many citizens agreed, until the courthouse burned down on August 3, 1892 in what was suspected to be arson; the deeds to the land were discovered a few yards from the fire, undamaged. In the wake of the destruction, a special election decided on moving the county seat to La Plata.

This move ended up spelling disaster for the Port Tobacco Times, which ended up merging with La Plata's Crescent in 1898 to form the Times Crescent, which is still running to this day under the name The Charles County Times-Crescent.

The appearance of the Port Tobacco Times was quite different from that of modern newspapers; it was filled with "essays, prayers, and verse" and often quoted British newspapers so that early colonists could keep up with news "from home." Local news was relegated to a short column buried in the middle of the paper. The Times often printed humorous short notices, such as the following notice from January 1, 1851:

"GO IT BOOTS - A Mrs. Boots of Penna., has left her husband, Mr. Boots and strayed to parts unknown. We presume that the pair of boots are right and left. We cannot say, however, that Mrs. Boots is right, but there is no mistake that Mr. Boots is left."
