= Perryville, Maryland =

Perryville
- Town
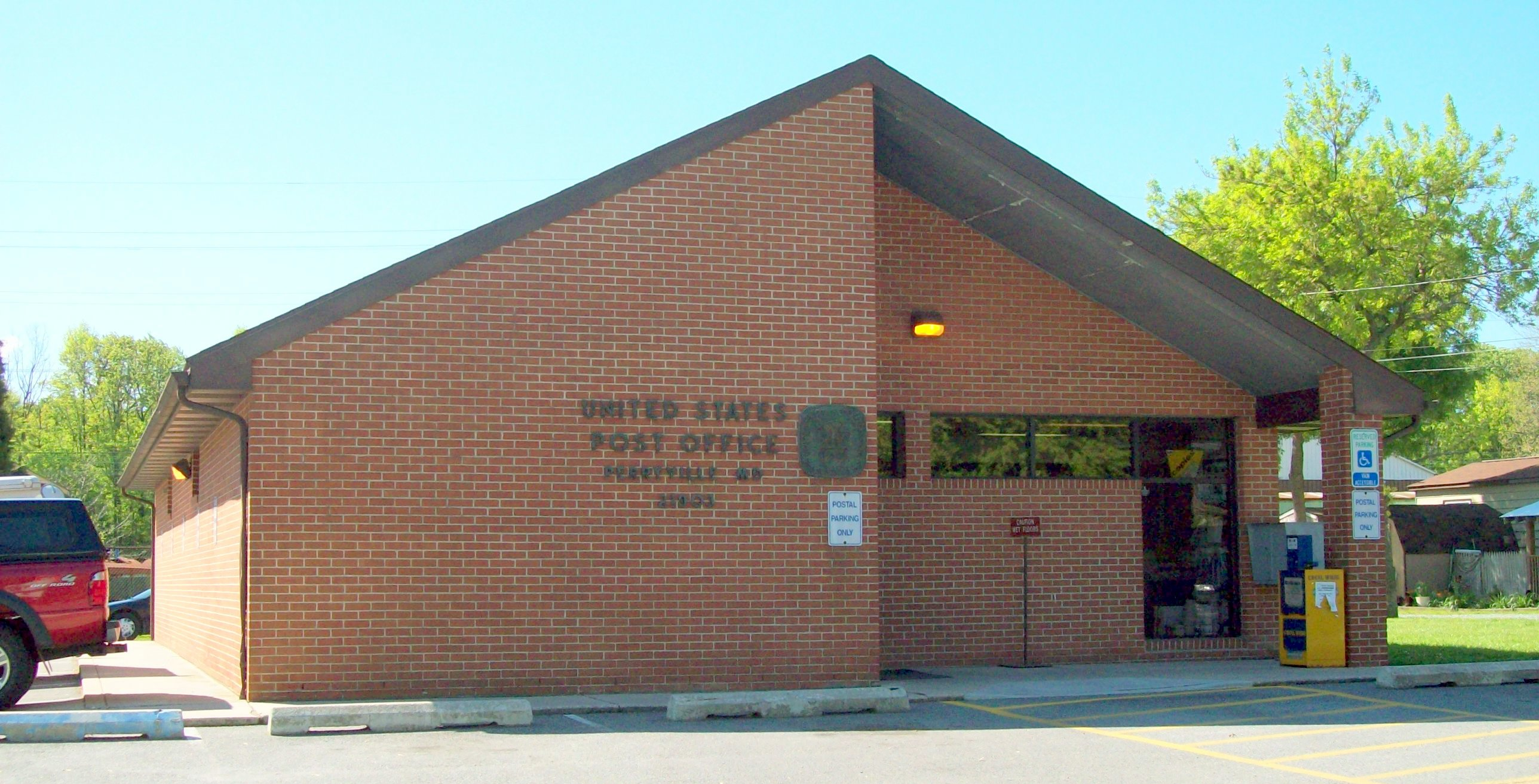
- U.S. Post Office, Perryville MD, April 2010

- Flag Seal

- Location of Perryville, Maryland
- Coordinates: 39°34′11″N 76°4′7″W
- Country: United States
- State: Maryland
- County: Cecil
- Incorporated: 1882

Government
  - Type: Commission government
  - Body: Mayor and Commissioners of the Town of Perryville
  - Mayor: Michelle Linkey
  - Commissioner: Robert Taylor; Tim Snelling; Julie Jeric; Charlene Hall

Area
  - Total: 3.20 sq mi (8.28 km^{2})
  - Land: 3.19 sq mi (8.27 km^{2})
  - Water: 0.0077 sq mi (0.02 km^{2})
- Elevation: 72 ft (22 m)

Population (2020)
  - Total: 4,391
  - Density: 1,375.7/sq mi (531.18/km^{2})
- Time zone: UTC−5 (Eastern (EST))
  - Summer (DST): UTC−4 (EDT)
- ZIP code: 21903
- Area code: 410
- FIPS code: 24-61150
- GNIS feature ID: 0590999
- Website: https://www.perryvillemd.org/

Perryville is a town in Cecil County, Maryland, United States. As of the 2020 census, Perryville had a population of 4,391. The town is located near an exit for Interstate 95, on the north side of the outlet of the Susquehanna River.

== History ==
Perryville was first settled by Europeans in 1622, when Edward Palmer was granted a patent for a settlement on what is now Garrett Island. During the 17th century, Lord Baltimore granted George Talbot 31,000 acres (130 km^{2}) of land, which included the Perryville area. Before incorporation (1882), the settlement was known as Lower Ferry (circa 1695), Susquehanna (circa 18th century), and was finally named Perryville after Mary Perry, the wife of John Bateman.

During the Revolutionary War, Perryville served as a staging area for the Continental Army. Colonel John Rodgers (1728–1791), who operated the ferry and tavern in Perryville, raised the 5th Company of the Maryland Militia. This company became part of the famous Flying Camp and was instrumental during the early stages of the Revolutionary War. George Washington stopped frequently at Rodgers Tavern on his travels from Virginia to New York. Rodgers Tavern was listed on the National Register of Historic Places during 1972. Colonel Rodgers' son, John Rodgers, was instrumental in suppressing the Tripolitan pirates in the Mediterranean Sea and was subsequently promoted to Commodore of the Mediterranean Squadron. Commodore Rodgers served with distinction during the War of 1812 and is known as the "Father of the American Navy."

During the 19th century, Perryville was the midway station for the Wilmington to Baltimore Rail Line. During the American Civil War, the railway line between Perryville and Baltimore was destroyed. To transport troops and munitions to Annapolis, the Union Army again began the operation of the ferry across the Susquehanna. The Principio Furnace is located nearby and was listed on the National Register of Historic Places in 1972.

During the 20th century, it was an important destination for those going to the United States Naval Training Center Bainbridge, Maryland, about three miles up the road, now no longer functioning and sold by the Navy. Perryville continued to serve as a railroad town. The interstate highway system, with access near Perryville, brought business from highway travelers.

Perryville is currently home to the Perry Point Veteran's Medical Center, located on a picturesque campus at the outlet of the Susquehanna River into the Chesapeake Bay. This same location is also the Northeast Campus of AmeriCorps National Civilian Community Corps, a residential national service program which recruits young Americans between the ages of 18 and 24 to perform community service in various locations in the country.

Perryville is the northern terminus of the MARC Penn Line commuter rail service, which runs south to Washington, D.C. via Baltimore. The 1905-built station also serves as a railroad museum and an Amtrak maintenance facility.

Perryville is home to the largest linwood tree in Maryland, located at 50 Millcreek Road on an estate known formerly as the Anchorage. Perryville is also home to numerous historical sites including the Principio Furnace.

== Geography ==
Perryville is located at 39°34′11″N 76°4′7″W (39.569662, −76.068725).

According to the United States Census Bureau, the town has a total area of 3.06 square miles (7.93 km^{2}), of which 3.05 square miles (7.90 km^{2}) is land and 0.01 square miles (0.03 km^{2}) is water.

== Demographics ==
Historical population
Census	Pop.	Note	%±
1880	143		—
1890	344		140.6%
1900	770		123.8%
1910	635		−17.5%
1920	652		2.7%
1930	704		8.0%
1940	729		3.6%
1950	679		−6.9%
1960	674		−0.7%
1970	2,091		210.2%
1980	2,018		−3.5%
1990	2,456		21.7%
2000	3,672		49.5%
2010	4,361		18.8%
2020	4,391		0.7%
U.S. Decennial Census

=== 2020 census ===
As of the 2020 census, Perryville had a population of 4,391 people, with 1,851 households and 1,130 families. The population density was 1,376.5 inhabitants per square mile (531.5/km^{2}), and there were 2,024 housing units at an average density of 634.5 per square mile (245.0/km^{2}).

The median age was 41.8 years. 21.7% of residents were under the age of 18, and 16.8% were 65 years of age or older. For every 100 females, there were 100.9 males, and for every 100 females age 18 and over, there were 99.2 males.

99.7% of residents lived in urban areas, while 0.3% lived in rural areas.

There were 1,851 households, of which 29.5% had children under the age of 18 living in them. Of all households, 40.3% were married-couple households, 23.8% were households with a male householder and no spouse or partner present, and 28.3% were households with a female householder and no spouse or partner present. About 34.7% of all households were made up of individuals, and 15.0% had someone living alone who was 65 years of age or older. The average household size was 2.53 and the average family size was 3.27.

There were 2,024 housing units, of which 8.5% were vacant. The homeowner vacancy rate was 2.6% and the rental vacancy rate was 4.2%.

Racial composition as of the 2020 census
Race	Number	Percent
White	3,475	79.1%
Black or African American	467	10.6%
American Indian and Alaska Native	22	0.5%
Asian	51	1.2%
Native Hawaiian and Other Pacific Islander	2	0.0%
Some other race	59	1.3%
Two or more races	315	7.2%
Hispanic or Latino (of any race)	188	4.3%

=== Income and poverty ===
The median income for a household in the town was $81,974, and the median income for a family was $98,934. The per capita income for the town was $36,276. About 4.4% of families and 9.3% of the population were below the poverty line, and 8.5% of those age 65 or over.

=== 2010 census ===
As of the census of 2010, there were 4,361 people, 1,762 households, and 1,130 families living in the town. The population density was 1,429.8 inhabitants per square mile (552.0/km^{2}). There were 1,959 housing units at an average density of 642.3 per square mile (248.0/km^{2}). The racial makeup of the town was 84.6% White, 9.6% African American, 0.4% Native American, 1.3% Asian, 0.1% Pacific Islander, 1.0% from other races, and 2.9% from two or more races. Hispanic or Latino of any race were 4.2% of the population.

There were 1,762 households, of which 32.2% had children under the age of 18 living with them, 48.0% were married couples living together, 11.9% had a female householder with no husband present, 4.3% had a male householder with no wife present, and 35.9% were non-families. 30.6% of all households were made up of individuals, and 11.5% had someone living alone who was 65 years of age or older. The average household size was 2.46 and the average family size was 3.07.

The median age in the town was 40.7 years. A total of 23.4% of residents were under the age of 18; 7.9% were between the ages of 18 and 24; 25.1% were from 25 to 44; 30.9% were from 45 to 64; and 12.6% were 65 years of age or older. The gender makeup of the town was 49.7% male and 50.3% female.

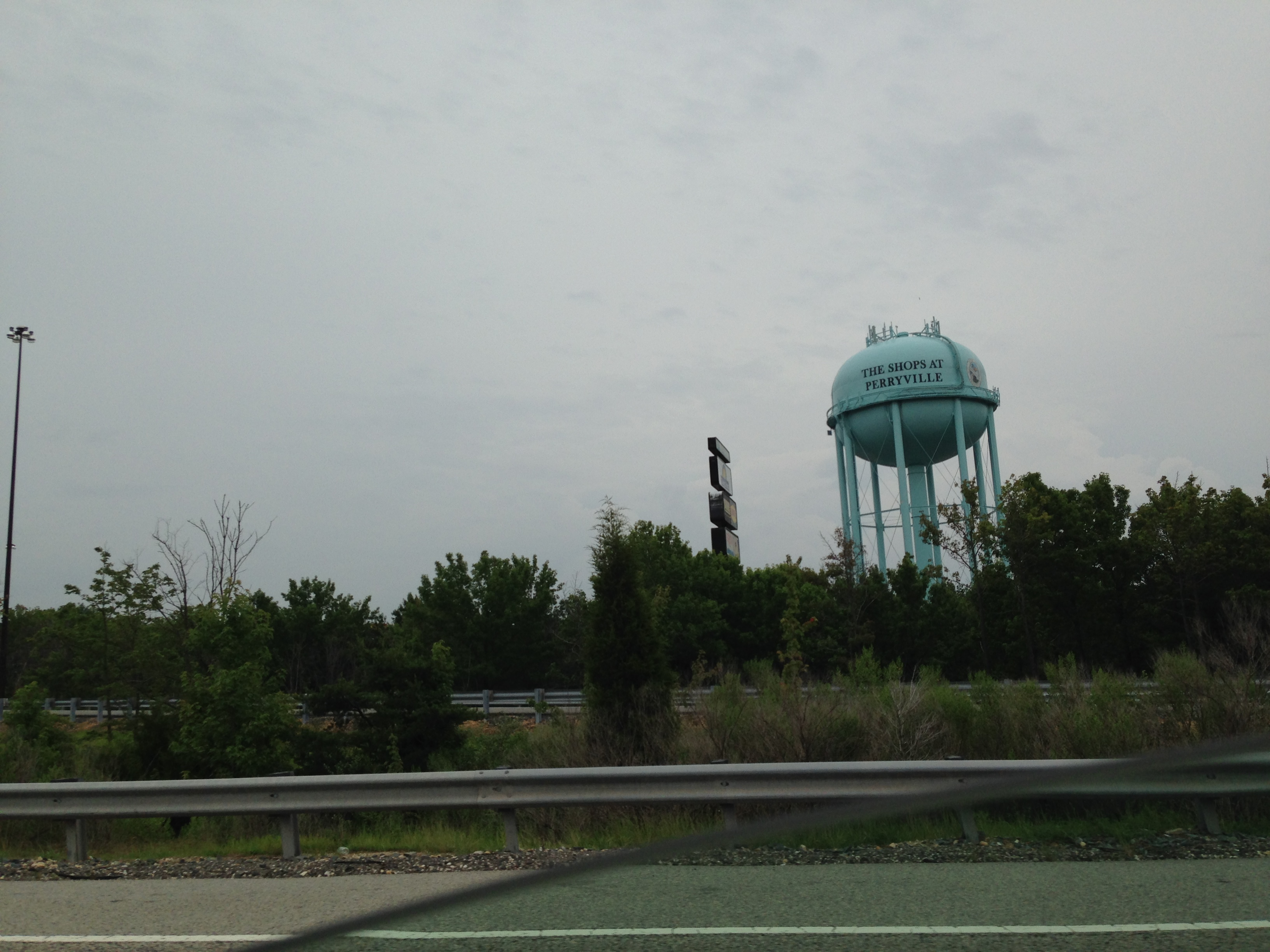
The tower near Perryville, Maryland.

=== 2000 census ===
As of the census of 2000, there were 3,672 people, 1,443 households, and 988 families living in the town. The population density was 1,479.0 inhabitants per square mile (571.0/km^{2}). There were 1,507 housing units at an average density of 607.0 per square mile (234.4/km^{2}). The racial makeup of the town was 90.93% Caucasian, 5.86% African American, 0.27% Native American, 0.76% Asian, 0.54% from other races, and 1.63% from two or more races. Hispanic or Latino of any race were 2.31% of the population.

There were 1,443 households, out of which 35.1% had children under the age of 18 living with them, 51.6% were married couples living together, 11.9% had a female householder with no husband present, and 31.5% were non-families. 27.3% of all households were made up of individuals, and 10.8% had someone living alone who was 65 years of age or older. The average household size was 2.52 and the average family size was 3.05.

In the town, the population was spread out age wise with 27.2% under the age of 18, 6.4% from 18 to 24, 32.5% from 25 to 44, 22.9% from 45 to 64, and 11.0% who were 65 years of age or older. The median age was 36 years. For every 100 females, there were 94.6 males. For every 100 females age 18 and over, there were 93.0 males.

The median income for a household in the town was $43,984, and the median income for a family was $52,981. Males had a median income of $39,112 versus $28,526 for females. The per capita income for the town was $20,040. About 6.0% of families and 7.8% of the population were below the poverty line, including 5.8% of those under age 18 and 21.8% of those age 65 or over.

== Economy ==
The town is home to one of IKEA's distribution centers, which houses one of the largest rooftop solar arrays in the U.S., and the largest in the state of Maryland. The distribution center’s total 4.9-MW solar installation of 25,913 panels generates 6,092,533 kWh of clean electricity yearly.

In 2010 Hollywood Casino opened the first legal casino in Maryland (Hollywood Casino Perryville) in the town. The casino is near the southbound exit of I-95. It offers slot machines, video gaming, table games, and a poker room area. The revenues from the casino are divided with the Town of Perryville and Cecil County government as well as the state.

In 2018, it was announced that Great Wolf Resorts would open a new Great Wolf Lodge in Perryville. Great Wolf Lodge Maryland opened June 14, 2023, to become Great Wolf Lodge's twentieth and largest resort. The resort contains an indoor waterpark and other attractions, a Dunkin' store, and a Build-a-Bear Workshop.

== Infrastructure ==
=== Transportation ===
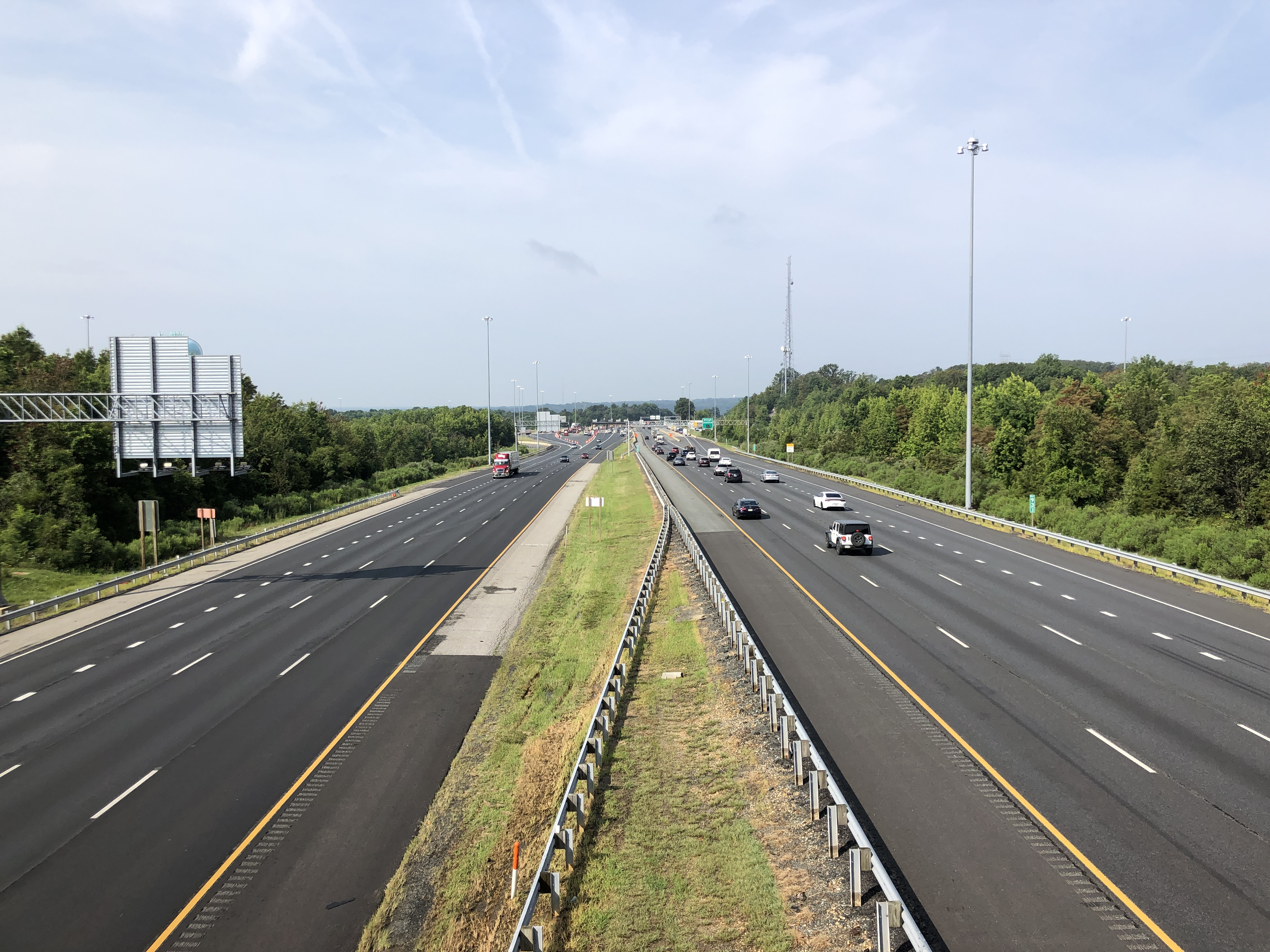
I-95 in Perryville

The main mode of transportation to Perryville is by road. Interstate 95 crosses the north edge of town, with an interchange at Maryland Route 222 providing direct access. U.S. Route 40 also traverses the town. The northern terminus of MARC's Penn Line commuter rail service to Baltimore and Washington, D.C. is at the Perryville station in Perryville. Cecil Transit provides bus service to Perryville along the Route 2 Cross-County Connection to North East and Elkton.

=== Library ===
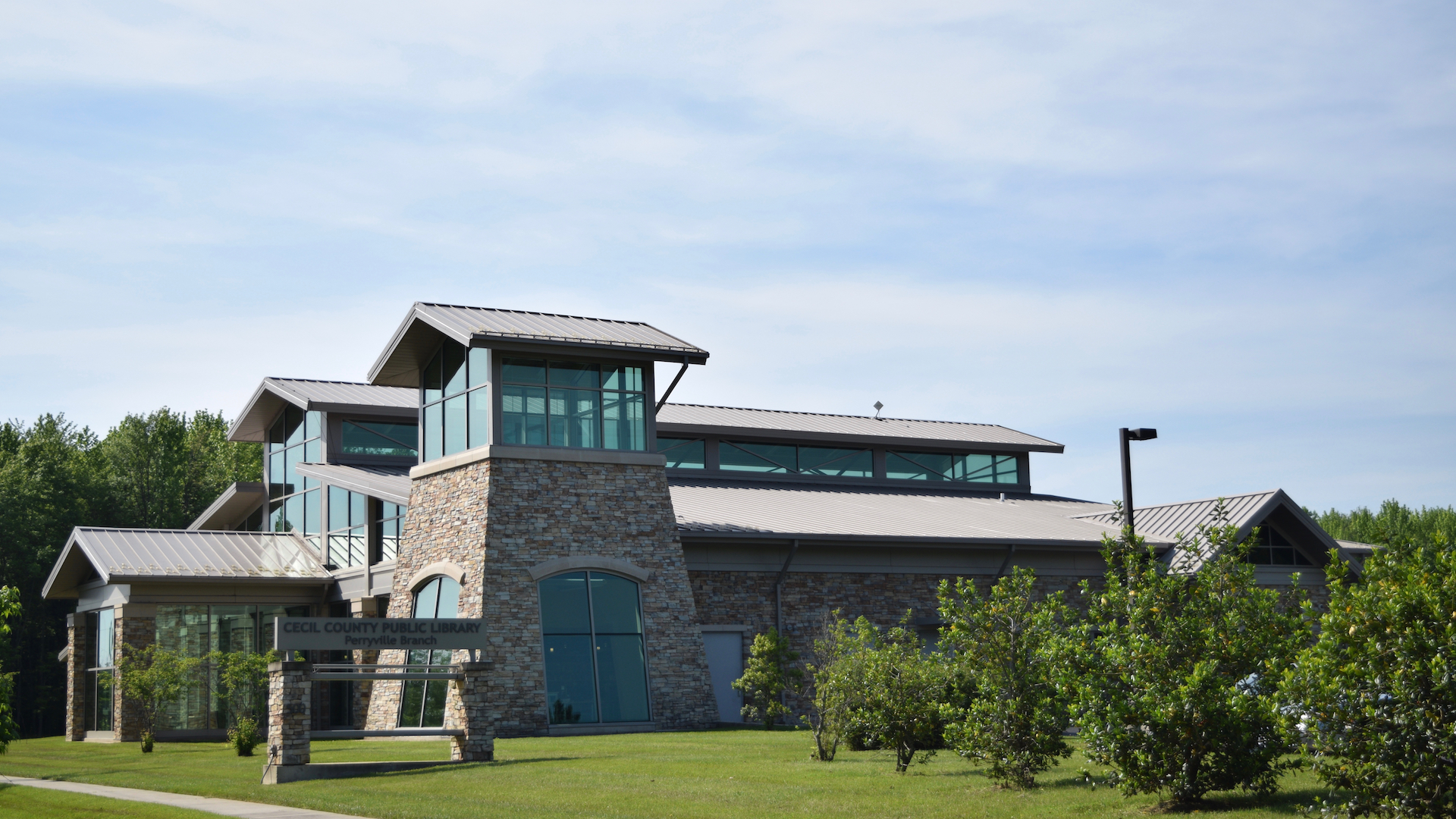
Cecil County Public Library - Perryville Branch

A new Perryville Branch of the Cecil County Public Library was opened in 2008.

=== Schools ===
There are four schools within Perryville's limits. Perryville Elementary, Middle and High Schools are public. The school sports mascot of Perryville High School is the panther. There is also one private school, a Catholic K-8 school named Good Shepherd. It is affiliated with the Roman Catholic Church of the same name.

=== Churches ===
Churches in Perryville include Blythedale Seventh-day Adventist Church, First Baptist Church of Perryville, Good Shepherd Catholic Church, Perryville Presbyterian Church, Perryville United Methodist Church, and St. Mark's Episcopal Church.

== Notable people ==
- Jim Keesey (1902–1951), professional baseball player born in Perryville
- John Rodgers (1772–1838), naval officer born in Perryville
- John Chew Thomas (1764–1836), politician born in Perryville
- Robert W. Smith IV (1973-Present), Army officer and native of Perryville
