= Rodgers Tavern =

- U.S. National Register of Historic Places
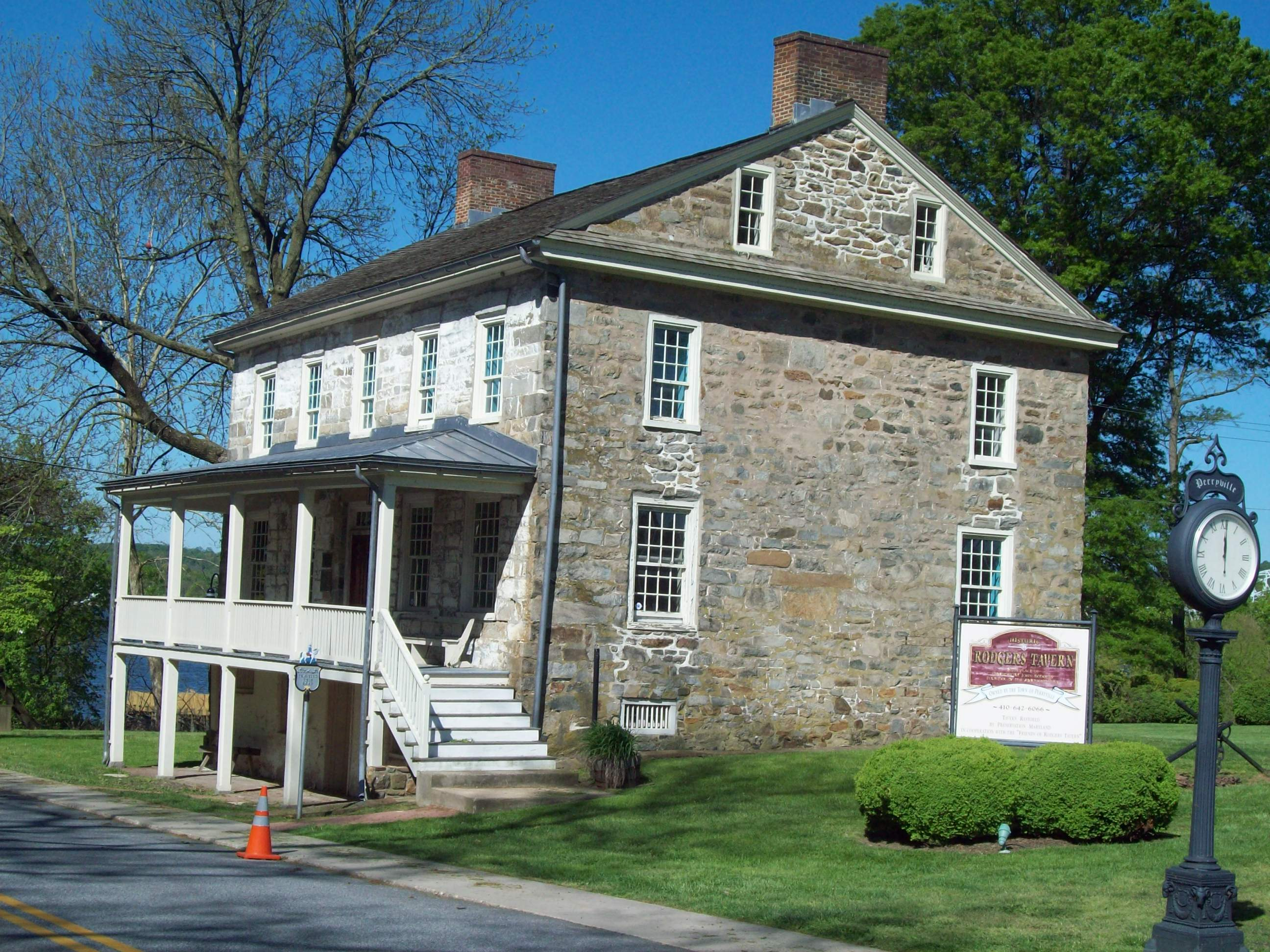
- Rodgers Tavern, April 2010

- Location within Maryland Location within the United States
- Location: 259 Broad Street, Perryville, Maryland
- Coordinates: 39°33′26″N 76°4′42″W
- Area: 1 acre (0.40 ha)
- Built: 1750
- NRHP reference No.: 72000576
- Added to NRHP: April 26, 1974

Rodgers Tavern, also known as Stevenson's Tavern, is a historic hotel located at Perryville, Cecil County, Maryland, United States. It is a mid-18th-century, two-story stone structure with a basement. All rooms have corner fireplaces. It was frequently visited by George Washington between the years 1755 and 1798, when it was owned and operated as an inn and tavern by Colonel John Rodgers (1728–1791). He was the father of John Rodgers (1772–1838), U.S. naval officer. During the 1880s the house was divided into two halves, east and west.

Rodgers Tavern was listed on the National Register of Historic Places during 1972.

== Construction ==
Rodgers Tavern, formerly known as Stevenson's Tavern, is an 18th-century historical tavern in Cecil County. The tavern is located on 259 Broad Street, Perryville MD, 21903 and is originally known as the Ferry House due to the fact that it was built next to a ferry in 1695. The original owner of the tavern was William Stevenson. There were other tavern keepers in later years until 1886 when the use of bridges and railroads began to replace the use of ferries and carriages, which caused the route that the tavern was on to decrease in popularity and no longer needed. The Philadelphia, Baltimore, and Washington Railroad bought the property as the tavern went into a period of neglect and deterioration. In 1956, the Society for the Preservation of Maryland Antiquities bought the tavern and friends of Rodgers Tavern began to rebuild the property to its former state. In 1956, the Society for the Preservation of Maryland Antiquities bought the tavern and friends of Rodgers Tavern began to rebuild the property to its former state. In 1972, the tavern was entered into the National Register of Historic Places.

== Architecture ==
The architecture for Rodgers Tavern is unique to the 18th century. The tavern has two stories. The exterior of the tavern is made out of stone that displays a fine quality of stone masonry, which gave the building a sense of taste and helped meet the needs of the taverns activities. The facade has 5 openings on each story. The center opening is an entrance to the first story and the basement. The main entrance consists of separate doors. The interior of the tavern is very distinctive as well with windows located on the first and second stories with 6 over 6 sash and wide frames. The East and West gables have two windows at each level and the cornice of the low pitched roof continues on all sides, which create pent eaves on the gables. The main floor has two parlors, one for the public and the other was a small office. The front parlor contains original 18th century paneling. The second floor has 5 chambers that were used mainly by its guests. Each room contains a corner fireplace. The southeast parlor is an original room, which contains raised panel chimney breast, bold cornice, 3 piece chair rail and original windows and door trim. This was the most elaborate design for all the rooms and tradition says that George Washington stayed in the northeast bedroom. In the 1880s, the house was divided into an east wing and a west wing with the original staircase being replaced by two steep enclosed stairs. The attic served as quarters for the guests’ servants, but was roughly finished.

== Usage (American Revolution - 1972) ==
The Rodgers family actively supported the American cause during the American Revolution. Due to its location on the main thoroughfare and the owners’ stalwart patriotism, it became a favorite stopping place for such Revolutionary figures as Washington, Lafayette, Rochambeau, Jefferson, and Madison. In 1775, Colonel John Rodger is known for leaving his post operating the ferry and tavern in order to assemble and lead the 5th Company of the Maryland militia, which later became associated with the Flying Corps, an integral part of the early Revolution. John Rodgers Jr. became known as the “Father of the American Navy” for his service in the war of 1812 as Commodore of the American Navy. In 1781, just after Rodgers bought the tavern, Washington brought troops through Lower Ferry Crossing where he would later win the battle of Yorktown against Cornwallis. He noted in his diary that he often dined there when traveling from Virginia to Philadelphia. Rodgers Tavern was convenient in its direct location across from Havre de Grace. Washington spent the night thirty times between 1775 and 1798 from his days in the pre-Revolutionary military through his presidency.

Following the American Revolution, Rodgers Tavern continued as a well-frequented establishment known for excellent food and entertainment. However, the Lower Susquehanna Route, in which Rodgers Tavern is located on, became less popular with the introduction of bridges and railroads over the now antiquated ferries and carriages. The prominence of the tavern diminished and was no longer needed, but it stayed open until around 1886. Because of its minimal use, the tavern largely deteriorated. It wasn’t until 1956, when the Society for the Preservation of Maryland Antiquities purchased the building, that a preservation and revitalization effort began to save the tavern. 16 years later, the tavern was finally entered in the National Register of Historic Places.

== Recent Renovations (1972 - Present) ==
In the past decade, the tavern served as a small museum and offices to the town chamber of commerce. Located in the Lower Susquehanna Heritage Area, Rodgers Tavern has received tremendous support for rehabilitation. Since its listing in the National Register of Historic Places in 1972, Rodgers Tavern has been a focus for many restoration projects, such as the Rodgers Tavern Readiness Project. The Rodgers Tavern Readiness Project is facilitated by the Lower Susquehanna Heritage Greenway (LSHG). The LSHG is a non-profit organization whose mission is to stimulate local economic activity by developing a linkage between our natural, historic and cultural resources. In 2008, LSHG received $100,000 from state grants towards the Rodgers Tavern Readiness Project. The scope of the project has been to restore this key historic property to its original uses as a tavern and ferry crossing for educational, recreational and economic development purposes. The overall project consists of three phases which include, 1. Facility stabilization and restoration, 2. Pier and trail construction and 3. Facility readiness. In 2010, LSHG requested $150,000 to ultimately complete the third and final phase of the Rodgers Tavern Readiness Project. According to the Baltimore Sun, the state has awarded LSHG $125,000 to complete the renovations. The grant will pay for interior and exterior repairs. The restoration plans include a new roof, gutters, downspout, interior plaster walls, fresh interior paint, electric work, heating, air conditioning, and a sewage connection to the city. During a recent excavation, artifacts have been found on site that are currently in storage until the reopening of the tavern. These artifacts consisted of antique clothing, furniture, and small trinkets.

== Perryville History ==
The town of Perryville itself has a rich history that surrounds the unassuming tavern. It was founded in 1608 after Captain John Smith visited following his adventure as the first European explorer to navigate the Susquehanna River. ). It was first settled by Edward Palmer after he was granted a patent for what is now Garrett Island. In the 1600s, Lord Baltimore granted Lord Talbot 31,000 acres of land, including Perryville. The town went through many names before its incorporation in 1882, including “Lower Ferry” in 1695 and “Susquehanna” in the 1700s. It wasn’t until the later 1700s that it came to be known as “Perryville” after John Bateman's wife, Mary Perry.
