= Adrian Posey =

American politician

Adrian Posey (October 14, 1857 – July 2, 1922) was an American politician, attorney, businessman and newspaper publisher from Charles County, Maryland.

== Early life ==
Born at Mount Pleasant, the Posey family farm near Allens Fresh, Adrian Posey was one of at least twelve known children born to farmer and grist mill operator, Washington Adrian Posey. Margaret Ellen Hamersley was Mr. Posey's second wife and the mother of five of his children, Adrian being the second oldest of those five. Adrian's paternal great-grandfather, Belain Posey (1737-1791), served as a captain in Colonel Thomas Ewing's Third Battalion of the Flying Camp during the Revolutionary War. When the Flying Camp was disbanded in December 1776, Belain returned to his native Charles County and continued his pre-Flying Camp service in the Charles County militia, rising to the rank of Colonel.

== Career ==
Practically self-taught, Posey was admitted to the bar at age 22 and in 1882 became publisher and editor in chief of The Maryland Independent until his death.

A Republican, Posey served one term in the Maryland House of Delegates (1888–1890) and two terms as a member of the Maryland Senate (1890–1894). In 1892, he was nominated to contest the post of senate president, losing to Edward Lloyd (1825–1907). It was during this period that Posey emerged as an ardent supporter and the instrumental, driving force behind moving the county seat from Port Tobacco to La Plata. In one writer's estimation, Adrian Posey was "the dynamic arch-enemy of old Port Tobaccoites and the ever vigilant, forceful, enthused supporter of anything having to do with La Plata's county pre-eminence in politics, commerce, and general economic well-being."

After stepping down from the state legislature, Posey served as Charles County State's Attorney (1896–1900) and subsequently continued his legal practice when his tenure ended. He also founded the Southern Maryland Savings Bank in 1899, which later transitioned into the Southern Maryland National Bank of La Plata in March 1907.

== Personal life ==
Adrian and his wife Mary Agnes "Mamie" Howard Posey, who were married January 29, 1885, built their Victorian style home, The Maples, in downtown La Plata and raised one son and three daughters. Shortly after the turn of the century, Posey became one of the first residents of Charles County to own a car. The original home completely burned in a house fire in 1925, three years after Mr. Posey's death. The Maples was rebuilt in a more modern style and remained in Adrian Posey's family until his heirs sold the property to cousins in 1973.

Posey died of heart disease on July 2, 1922, at The Maples in La Plata and was laid to rest in the cemetery adjacent to historic St. Thomas Manor.

== Legacy ==
"If an historian had to select one figure who played a dominant role in the founding of La Plata, it would almost have to be Adrian Posey. As entrepreneur in the broadest possible sense, practicing attorney, State senator, publisher and editor, banker, real estate promoter and society leader, by almost any standard yesterday and today Mr. Posey emerges as the foremost community leader and godfather behind the 19th century development of La Plata."
