= St. Mary Anne's Episcopal Church =

- St. Mary Anne's Episcopal Church; North Elk Parish; Established 1706
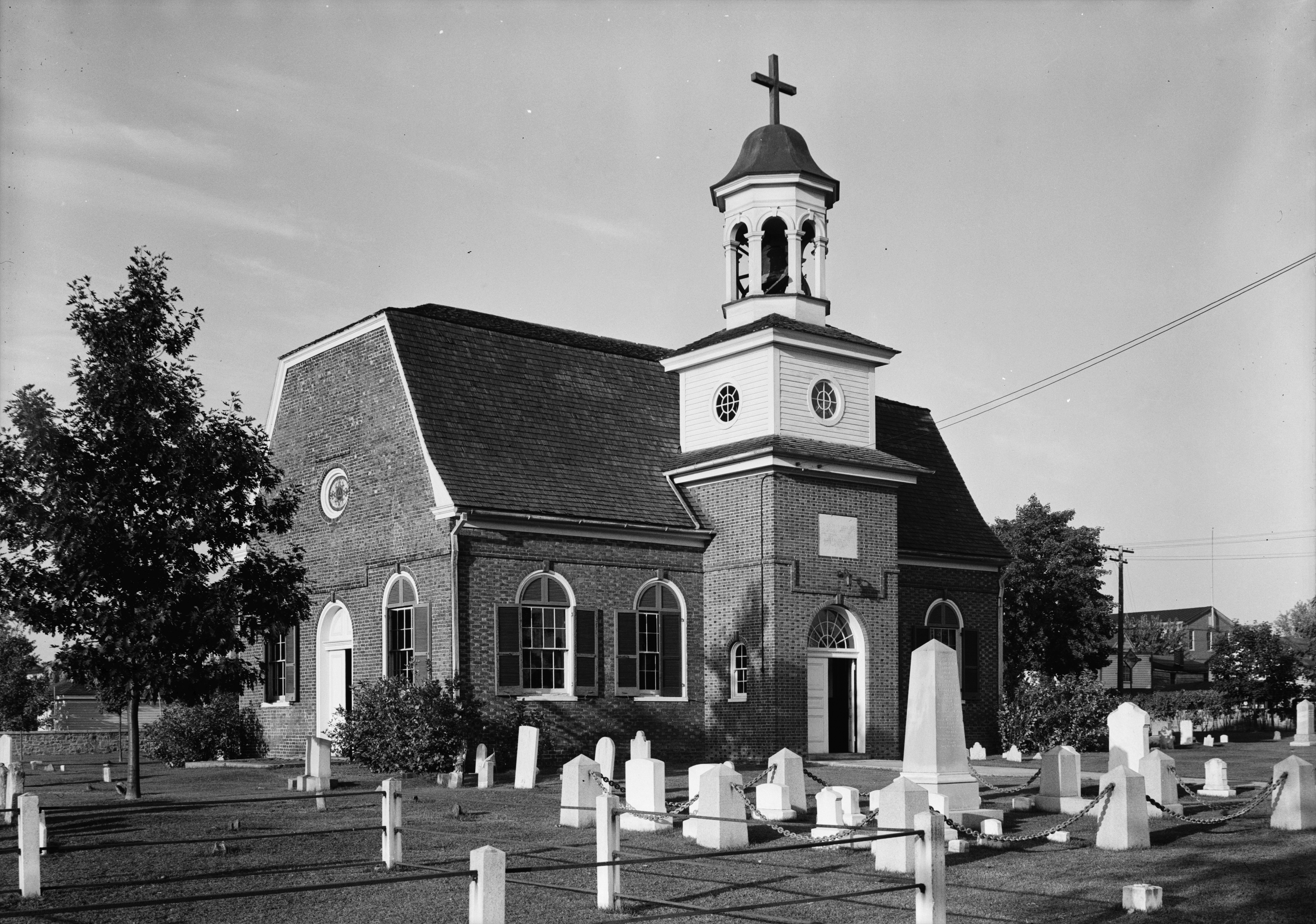
- St. Mary Anne's Episcopal Church, October 1936
- St. Mary Anne's Episcopal Church
- 39°35′46″N 75°56′33″W
- Location: 315 South Main Street; North East, Maryland
- Country: USA
- Denomination: Episcopal
- Website: stmaryanne.org

Architecture
- Completed: 1742

St. Mary Anne's Episcopal Church is an historic Episcopal church building located at 315 South Main Street in North East, Cecil County, Maryland. Built in 1742 of red brick in a rectangular shape to replace an earlier wooden church building on the site, it is the second parish church building for North Elk Parish, later known as St. Mary Anne's Parish, which had been established in 1706 by the General Assembly of the Province of Maryland. Originally dedicated to St. Mary, the parish added Anne to its name in thanks for a bequest it received from the estate of Anne, Queen of Great Britain, who died in 1714. Its bell tower was added in 1904.

St. Mary Anne's is still an active parish in the Episcopal Diocese of Easton. The Rev. John Schaeffer is the current rector.

== History ==
The church was established by the governor of Maryland along the north shore of the Elk River in 1706, with four acres of land set aside for a church building. Between 1709 and 1715, a wooden church was built on the site of the present church, but no details are known about this building. A Swedish Lutheran Reverend, Jonas Auren who had come to America in the late 1600s, preached here for a congregation made of Swedes and Finns from the former colony of New Sweden, as well as English colonists, until his death in 1713. During this time the church was known as St. Mary's parish. In 1714, Queen Anne of England died. In an effort to establish the Anglican Church in the colonies she bequeathed a large Bible, a Book of Common Prayer and a silver chalice and paten to the congregation. In a gesture of appreciation, St. Mary's was renamed St. Mary Anne's.

In 1845 St. Marks's, Perryville opened as a chapel of ease for St. Mary's Parish. In 1913, St. Mark's was established as Susquehanna Parish.

== Cemetery ==
Burials in St. Mary Anne's historic cemetery include:

- Thomas Russell (1743–1786), ironmonger and manager of Principio Furnace, brother of William Russell
- John Conard (1773–1857), Pennsylvania congressman

== See also ==
- List of post 1692 Anglican parishes in the Province of Maryland

== Gallery ==
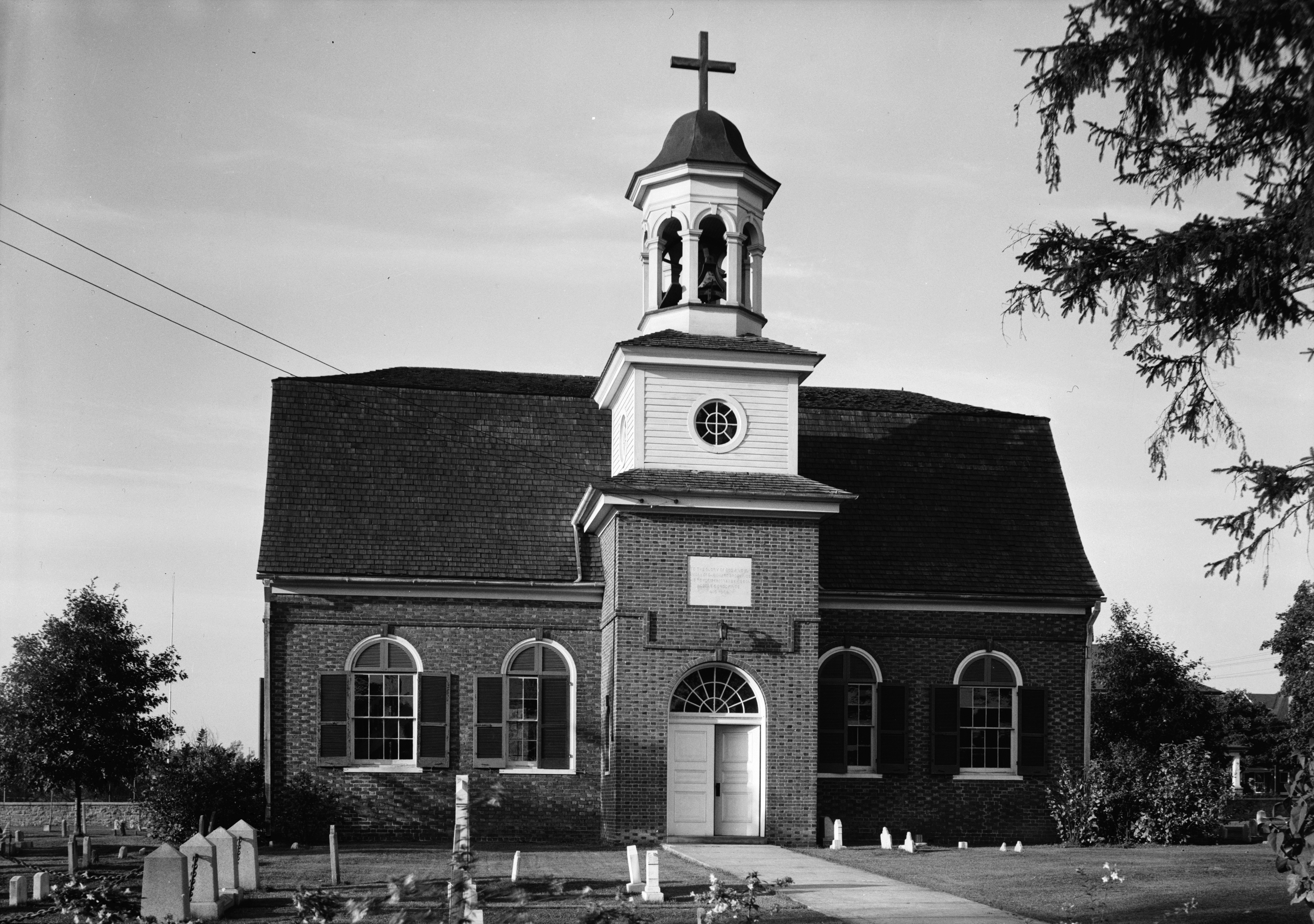
Front view

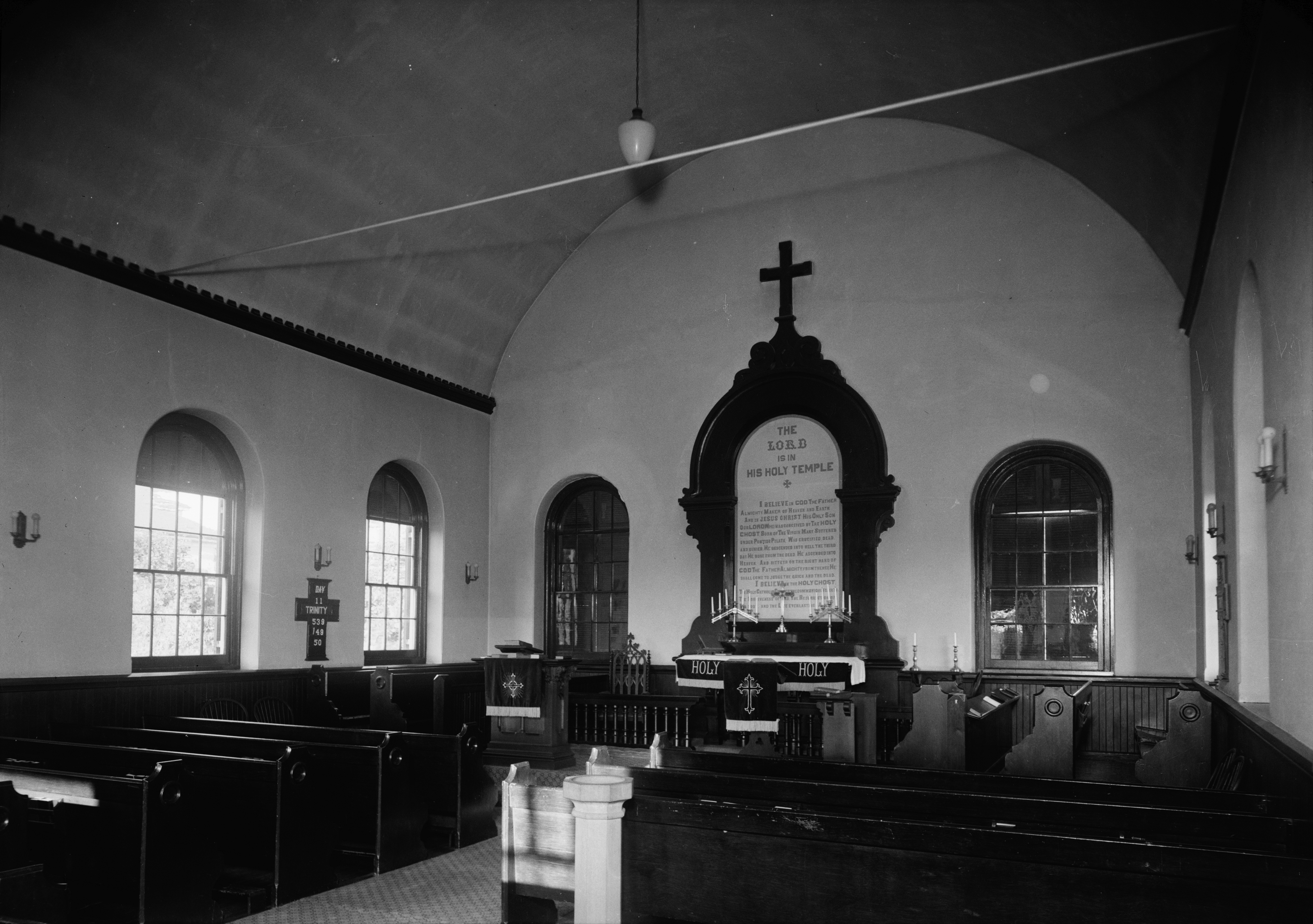
Interior
