= Times Crescent =

- Type: Weekly newspaper
- Publisher: La Plata Pub. Co. (1893-1966), Times-Crescent Pub. Co. (1966-1989), Free State Communications, Inc. (1989-present)
- Founded: May 26, 1893
- Language: English
- Headquarters: La Plata, Maryland
- OCLC number: 11544286

The Times Crescent is a newspaper that began publishing on May 26, 1893 and was published until 1966 as the Times Crescent and then was published as The Times Crescent Charles County Leaf until 1971. La Plata, Charles County, Maryland. Walter J. Mitchell, who later became a judge of the Maryland Court of Appeals from 1934-1941, was the man responsible for merging the existing La Plata paper, the Crescent, with the Port Tobacco Times to form the Times Crescent in 1898. When Mitchell became a judge, his son James C. Mitchell took over operations for the Times Crescent and remained owner of the paper until his death in 1989. The newspaper went by the name Crescent from its inception until January 14, 1898, when it was renamed to The Times Crescent. The paper ran under this name until March 24, 1966, when it was briefly changed to The Times-Crescent The Charles County Leaf. On May 27, 1971, the paper returned to its previous name, but with a dash between the words: Times-Crescent. Finally, in 1989, the Times underwent its final name change and became The Charles County Times-Crescent, which is its name to this day.

Louis Metcalf Hyde was the printer-editor of the Times Crescent from 1898 through 1948. He had previously worked for the Port Tobacco Times and became managing editor for the Times Crescent after it merged with and absorbed the Port Tobacco Times.
