= Maryland Independent =

Semi-weekly newspaper published in Waldorf, Maryland, US

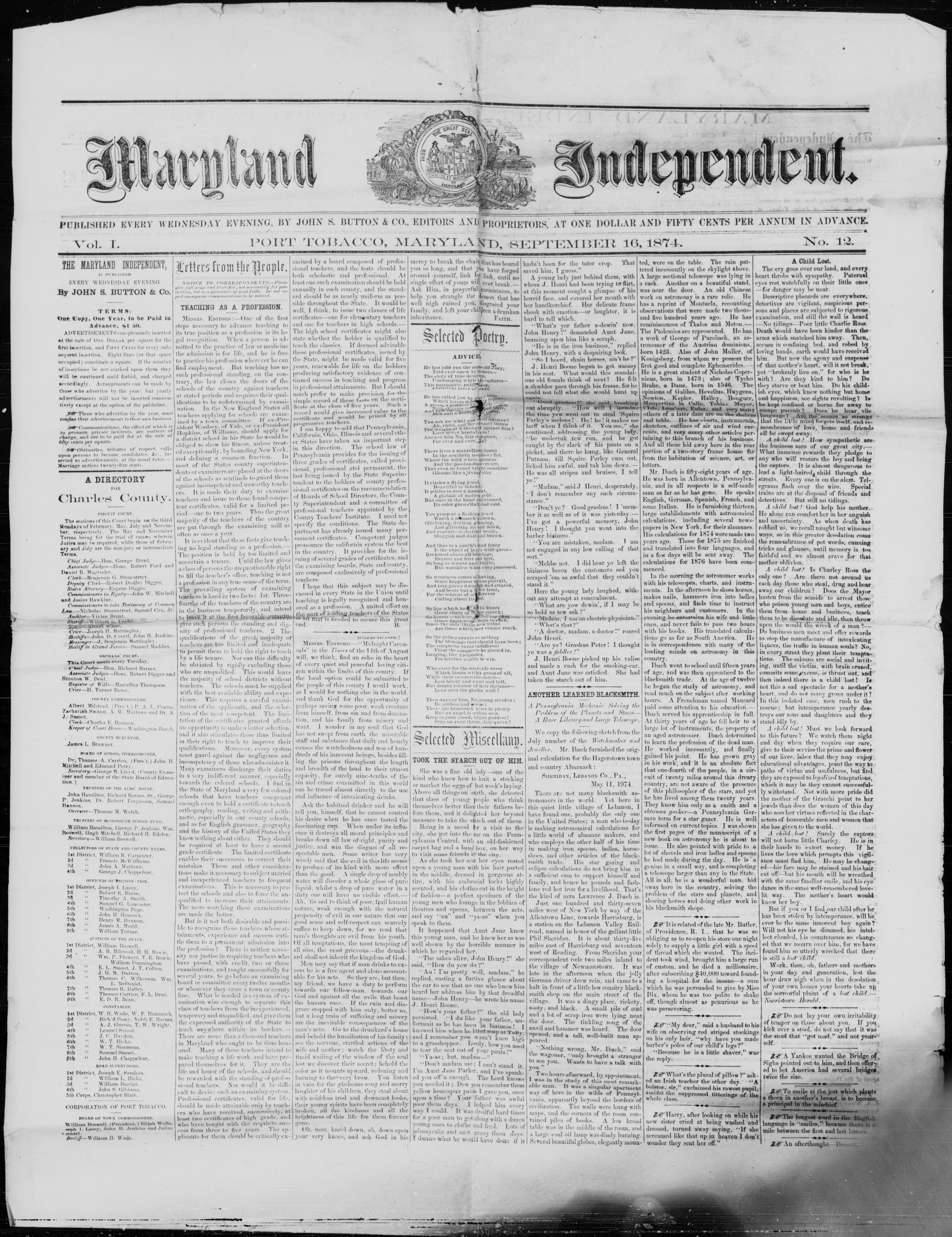
- The cover page of the September 16, 1874 issue of the Maryland Independent
- Type: Semi-weekly
- Owner(s): Adams Publishing Group
- Founder(s): John S. Button
- President: Jim Normandin
- Editor: Jesse Yeatman
- Founded: September 1874
- Headquarters: La Plata, Maryland
- Circulation: 7,104 (as of 2021)
- OCLC number: 11730041
- Website: somdnews.com/independent

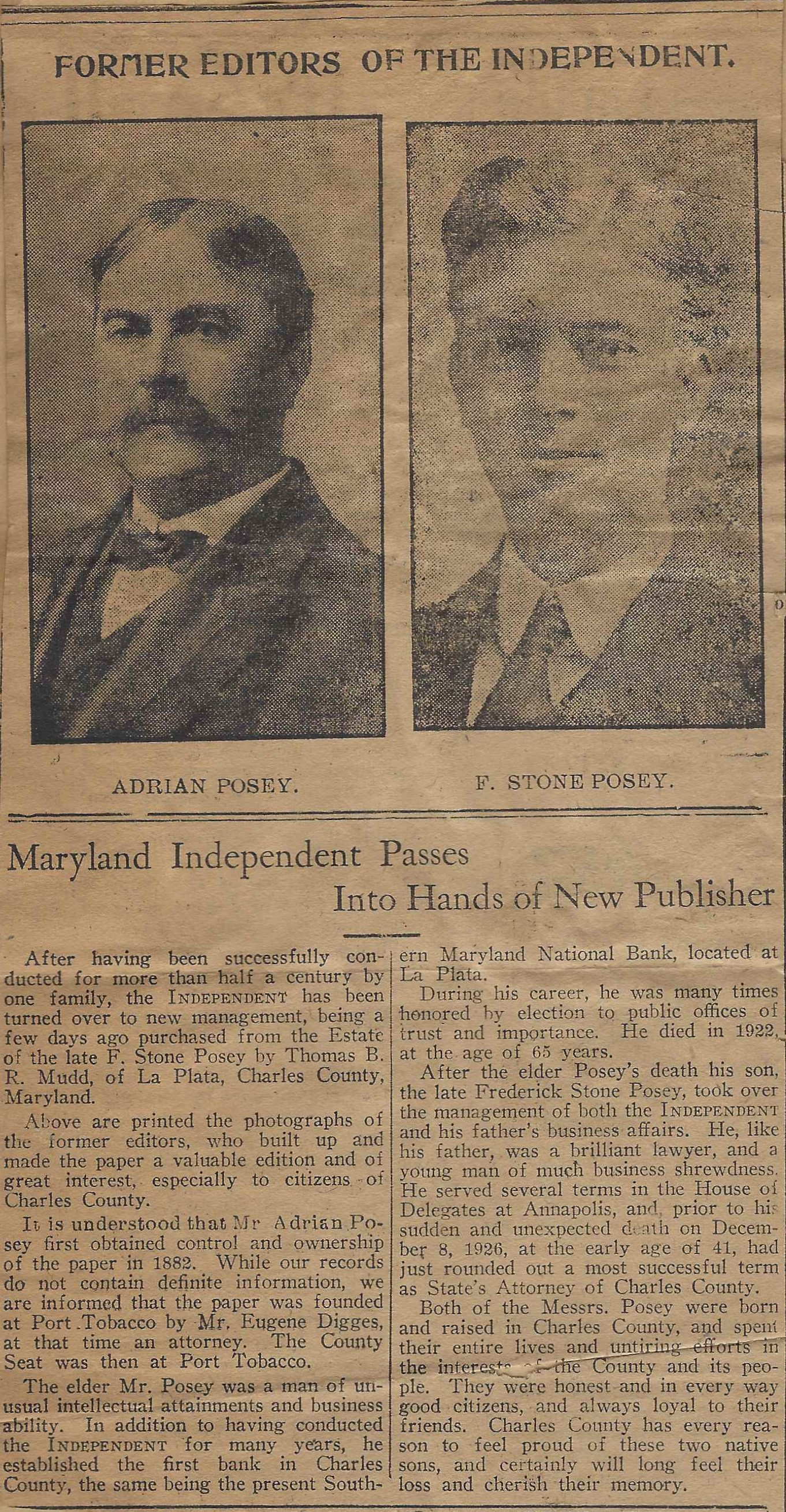
Posey heirs sell Maryland Independent

The Maryland Independent is a semi-weekly newspaper that began publication in September 1874 in Port Tobacco, Charles County, Maryland.

== History ==
The Maryland Independent was founded by John S. Button, a local printer and Freemason. Its Republican slant paralleled the growing popularity of the Republican party in Charles County, and when former state's attorney Eugene Diggs joined the newspaper as an editor in 1877, he maintained this advocacy for Republican candidates and policies. This political position put the Maryland Independent directly at odds with the county's Democratic paper, the Port Tobacco Times, a rivalry that would continue for years.

In 1879, the paper turned Democratic for a short time when local Democratic leader Charles Vivian Brent acquired the newspaper, retaining Button as business manager. Button died the following year, and Brent moved on in 1882 to a series of positions in the federal government, resulting in the paper's sale to Adrian Posey. Posey was a Republican lawyer who served in the Maryland House of Delegates from 1888 to 1890, the Maryland Senate from 1890 to 1894, and as the Charles County State's Attorney from 1896 to 1900. In late 1893, Posey built new offices and moved the newspaper's operations from historic Port Tobacco to the bustling new town of La Plata, which soon became the Charles County seat in 1895.

After Adrian Posey's death in 1922, his son Frederick Stone Posey continued publishing the Maryland Independent until his death in 1926, when the Posey family sold it to Thomas Brackett Reed Mudd. Though Mudd came from a prominent Republican family, his tenure at the newspaper was short, with brothers Ruey Philip and Philip Benjamin Bowling publishing the paper by 1930.

The Maryland Independent continues publication to the present day, under the ownership of APG Media of Chesapeake. In July 2020, the paper was consolidated into Southern Maryland News, which covers neighboring St. Mary's and Calvert counties.
