= St. Mark's Episcopal Church (Perryville, Maryland) =

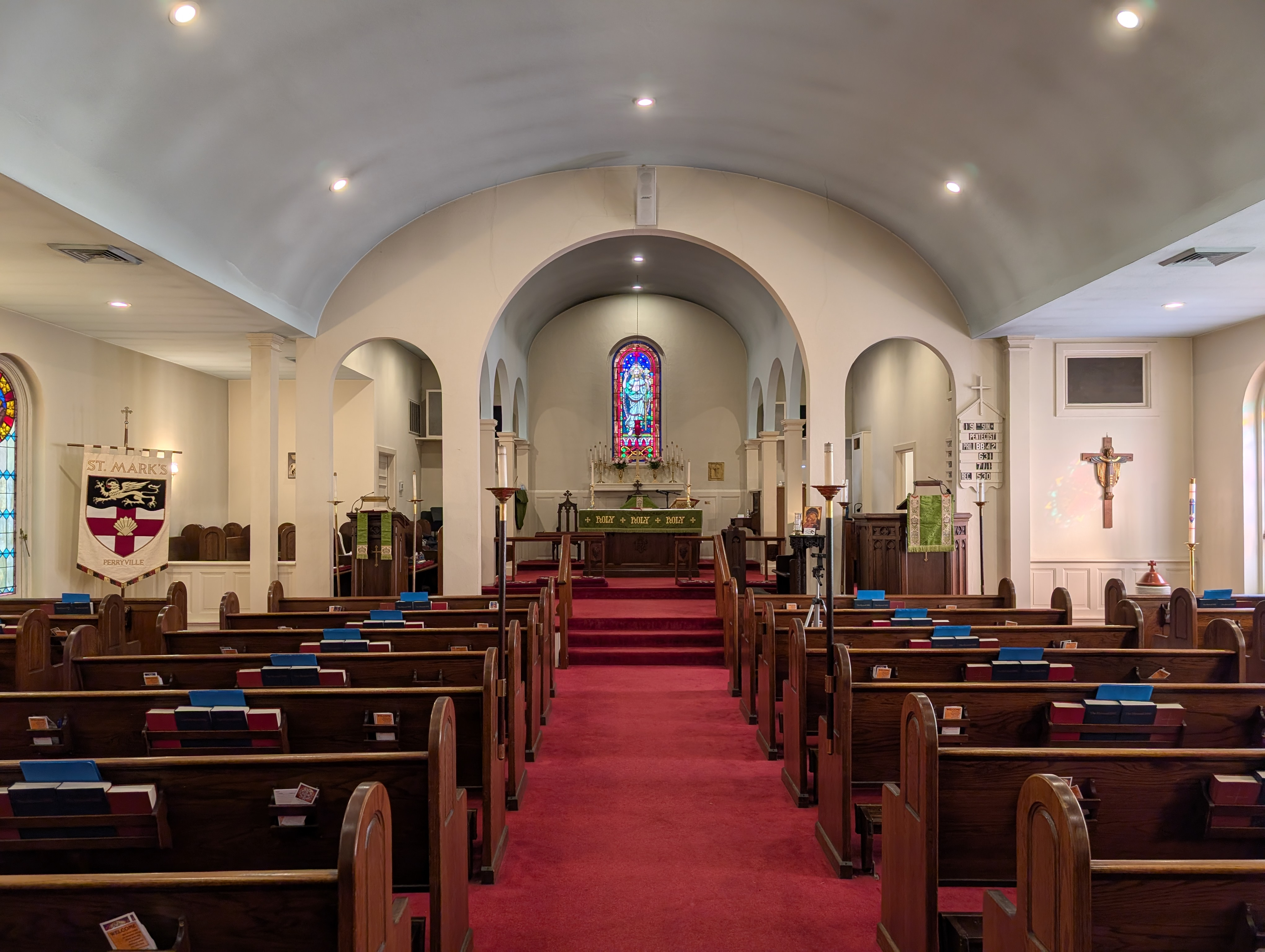
- Inside view of the nave from the vestibule

- Location within USA Mid-Atlantic
- 39.582949°N 76.073947°W
- Location: Perryville, Maryland
- Address: 175 St Marks Church Road, Perryville MD, 21903
- Country: United States
- Denomination: Episcopal
- Website: saintmarksperryville.org

History
- Status: Parish church
- Dedication: St. Mark

Architecture
- Completed: 1845

Administration
- Province: Province of Washington
- Diocese: Diocese of Easton
- Parish: Susquehanna Parish

Clergy
- Priest: Reverend Susan Oldfather

St. Mark's Episcopal Church is a historic Episcopal church located at 175 St. Marks Church Road in Perryville, Cecil County, Maryland, and is the parish church for the Susquehanna Parish in the Diocese of Maryland. There are several 19th-century burials in its cemetery including that of Maryland congressman George Gale

== History ==
=== Founding of the chapel ===
“Aunt” Harriet Anderson had lived with her cousin Mrs. Samuel Chamberlaine in Oxford at “Bonfield” until she was able to purchase an estate near her Gale cousins, children of George Gale near Perryville. She purchased George Gale's former home of “Brookland”. When she died in 1832, she was buried in the family cemetery on that property. She left the house and land to her maiden cousins. Leah, Anna Maria, and Sally Hollyday Gale donated the Gale family burial plot to the Episcopal Church to erect a chapel. Bishop William Rollinson Whittingham laid the cornerstone on September 3, 1844. Construction was completed in 1845. It was established as a Chapel of Ease for St. Mary Anne's Episcopal Church in North East.

=== First rector ===
The Rev. Richard Whittingham began his career as a minister at St. Mark's Chapel in Aiken, Cecil County, Maryland. He was the younger brother of the Bishop of Maryland, William Rollinson Whittingham and the son of Richard Whittingham and Mary Ann Rollinson Whittingham of New York City

==== Biography ====
In 1845, Richard Whittingham Jr. was granted a license as a lay reader in Maryland by his brother the Bishop while still a candidate for orders in New York. It was in this capacity that he came to St. Mark's. He served as an assistant minister for St. Mary Anne's in North East by presiding over service at St. Mark's Chapel until his resignation in 1847 when he accepted a position in New York. He is listed as the Deacon in Sag Harbor in a document printed for the New York Convention in that year. The Rt. Rev. Dr. Whittingham, Bishop of Maryland admitted Rev. Richard Whittingham Jr into the Holy Order of Priests on December 3 of 1848 at All Saints' Church in New York City. The Bishop Whittingham was filling in for the Rt. Rev. Dr. Doane, Bishop of New Jersey, who was very ill and unable to perform the duties. He served as a minister for many years before finally returning to Cecil County. In 1892, Rev. Richard Whittingham is listed as a resident of Aiken, Maryland in the "Post Office List of the Clergy".

He died c. 1908. On his headstone it reads “'Died St. Mathew's Day, 84 years old”. He was married to Sarah “Sally” Rebecca Chamberlaine in 1850 and they had five children. Both are buried in St. Mark's cemetery. According to her headstone, she died on All Saints' Day and was the daughter of Henry Chamberlaine who was grandson to George Gale. Their children Anna Louisa, Helen Winifred, and Richard Alpert remained residents of the Aiken/Perryville area until their deaths and burial at St. Mark's.

=== Evolution of a church ===
According to documents on file with the Maryland Historical Trust, the original chapel was a single room with two glass windows. There was a door that faced south at one end. In 1898, St.Mark's could seat 100 and had an active Ladies Guild. Through the efforts of Rev. Whittingham and church members a pipe organ was installed in the chapel. In this same year a chancel rail was donated by a lady of the church in memory of her husband. The Ladies Guild organized the building of the Parish House on land donated for that purpose. The Maryland Historical Trust documents state that the stained glass windows were added c. 1900. It also states that the present appearance was created by a renovation in 1957 that removed most of the original building, replacing it with more modern materials.

The Chapel became a Church when the Susquehanna Parish was created prior to 1911. Most of the original furnishings were replaced when the church was renovated and enlarged in 1957.

== Gallery ==
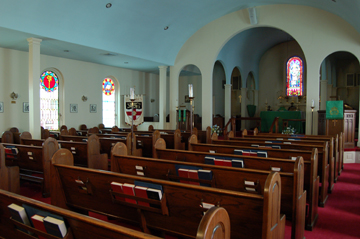

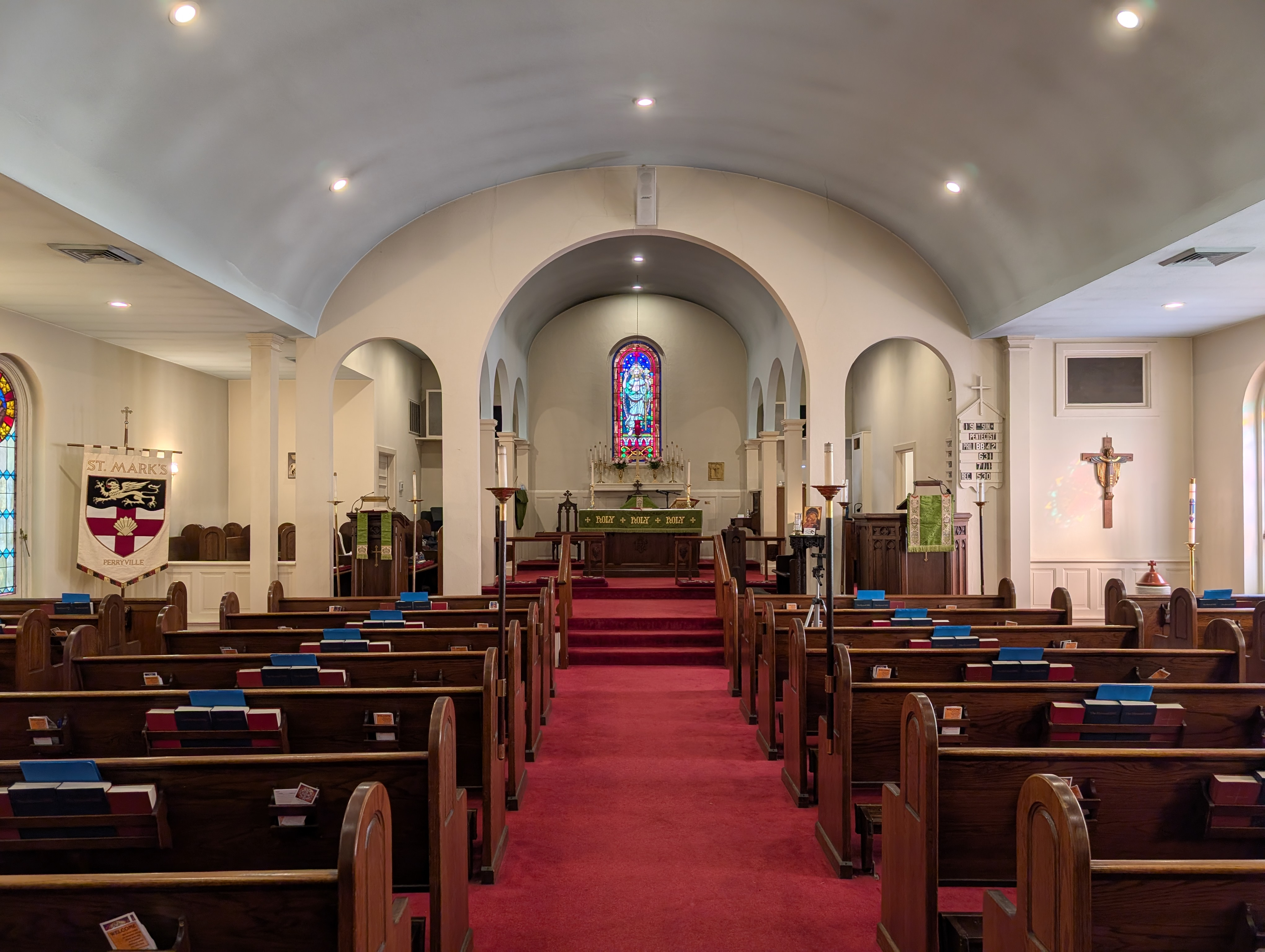

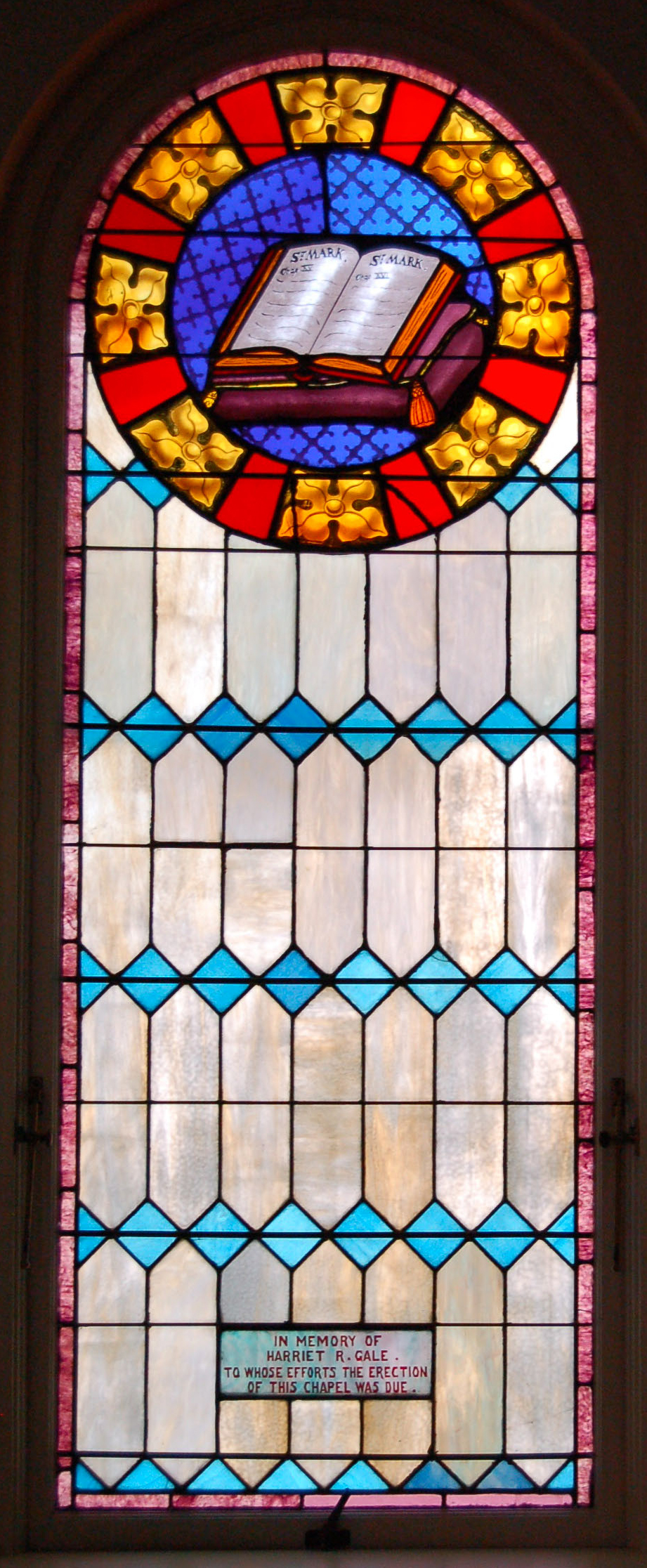

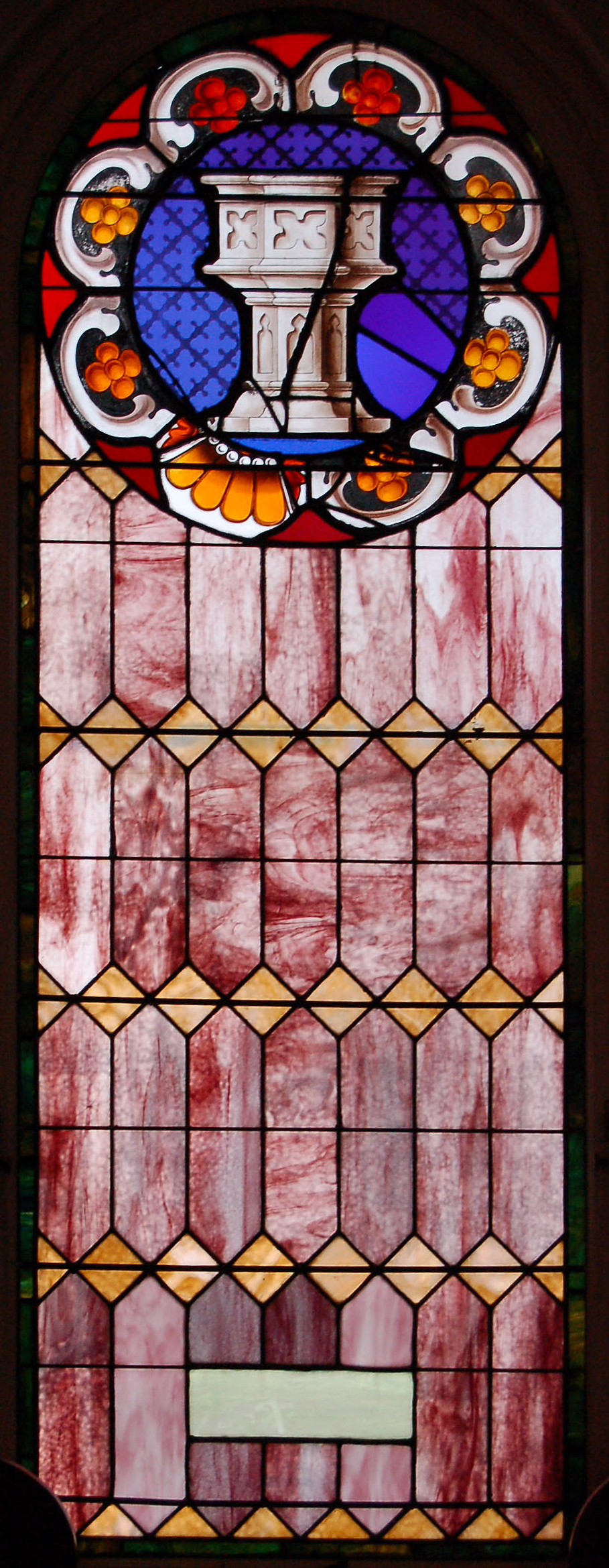

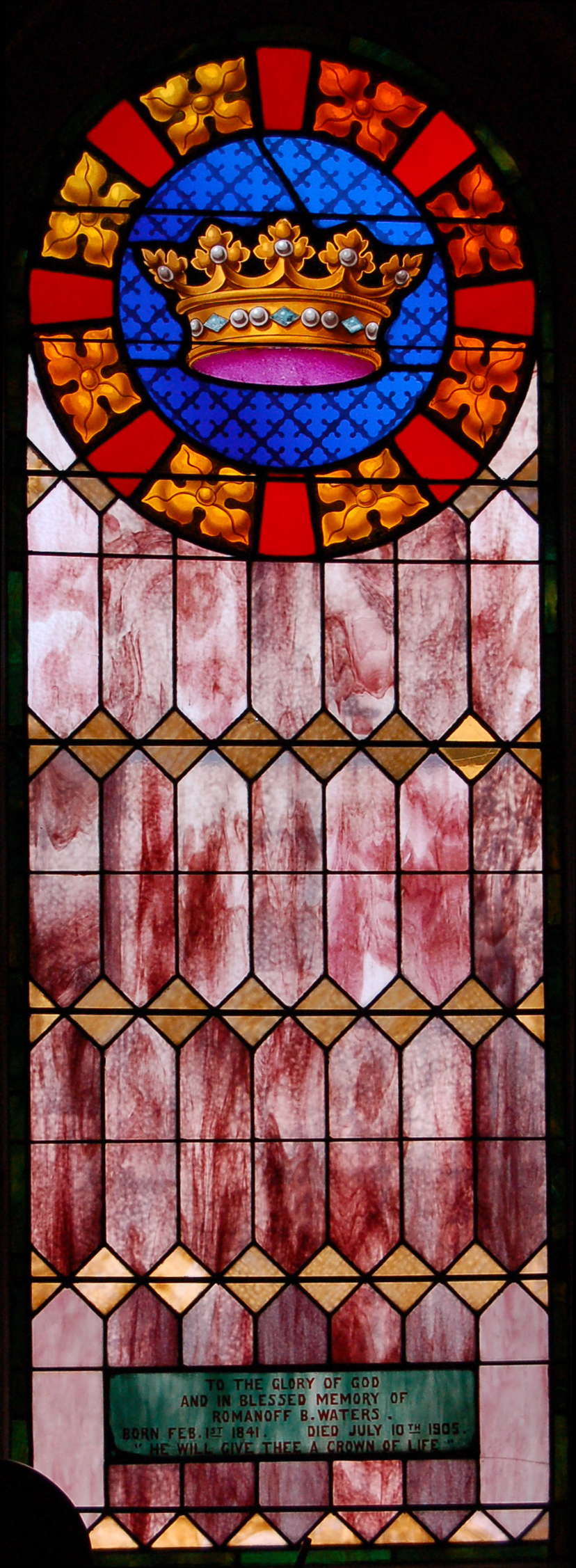

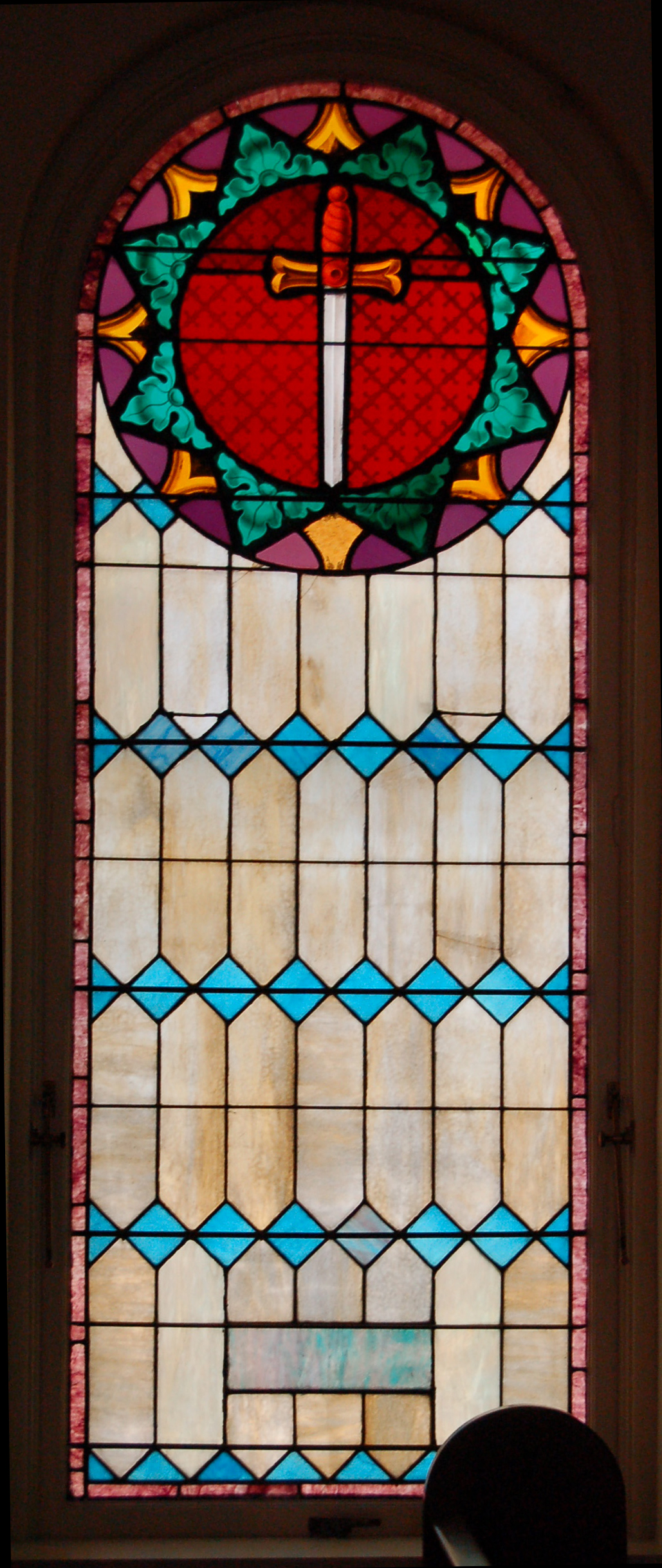

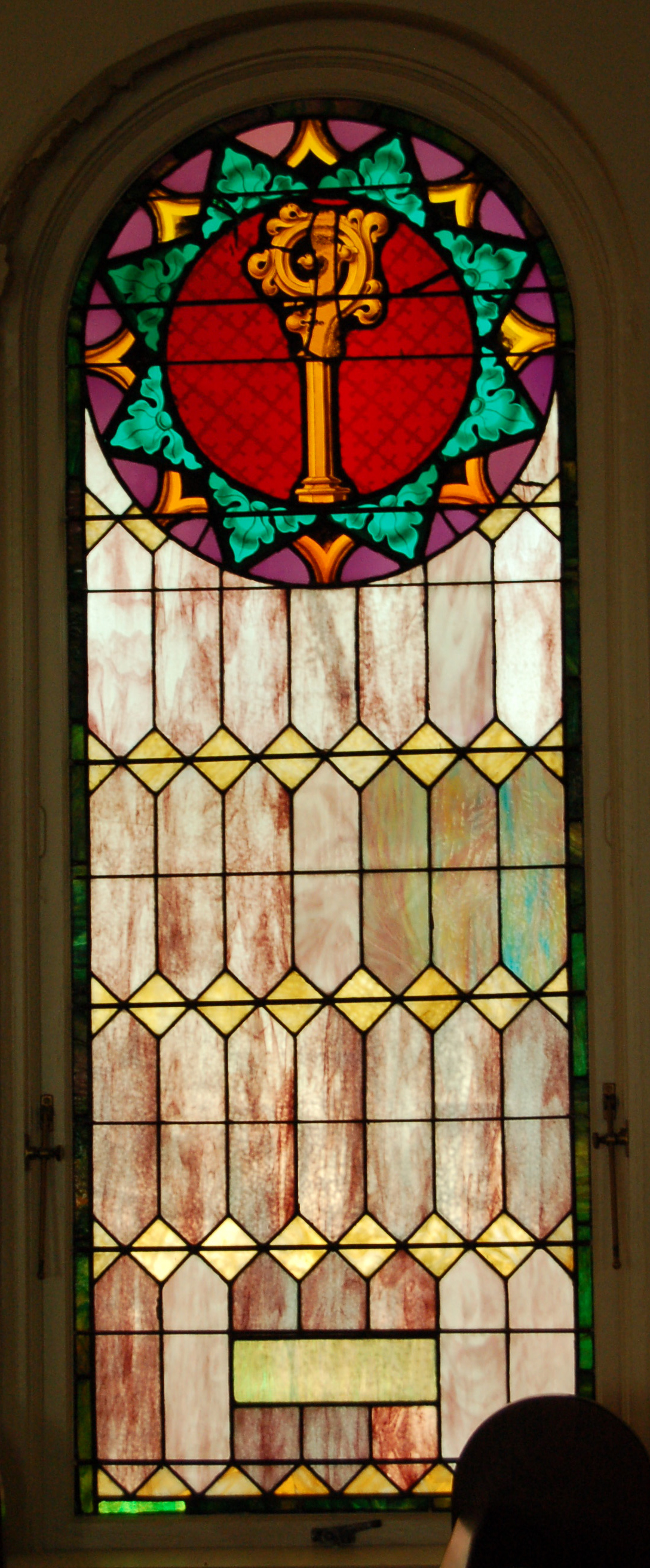

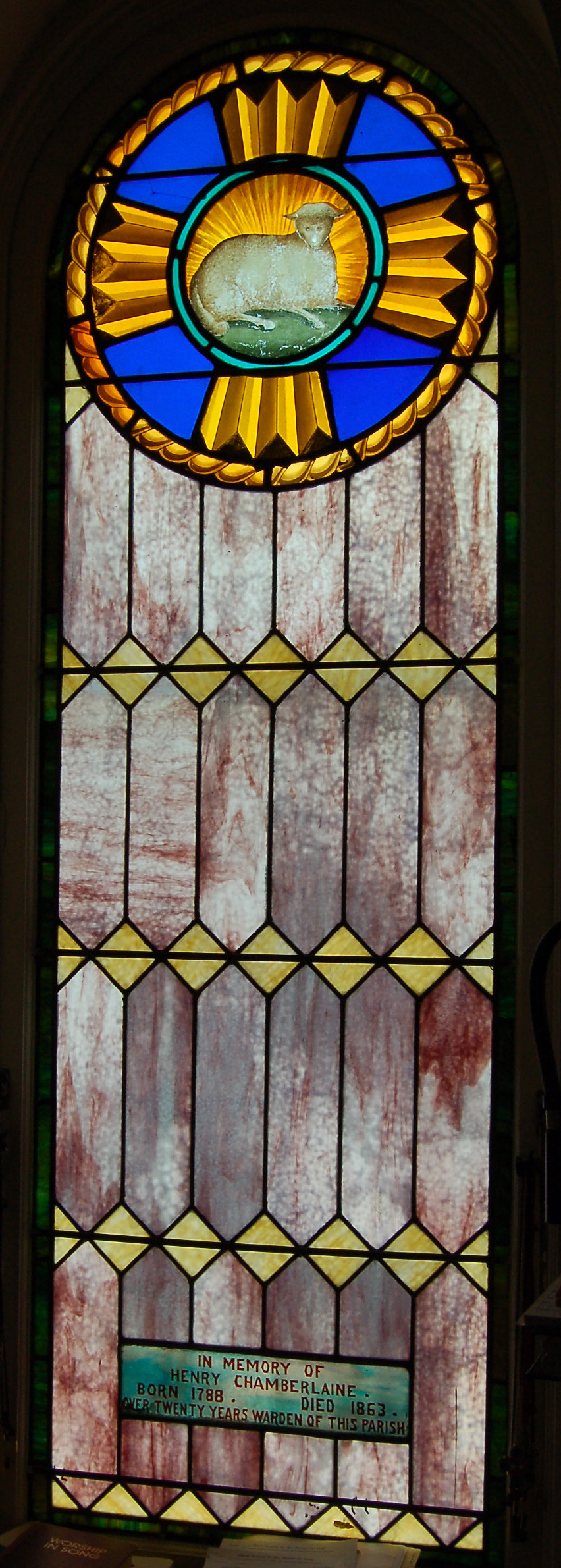

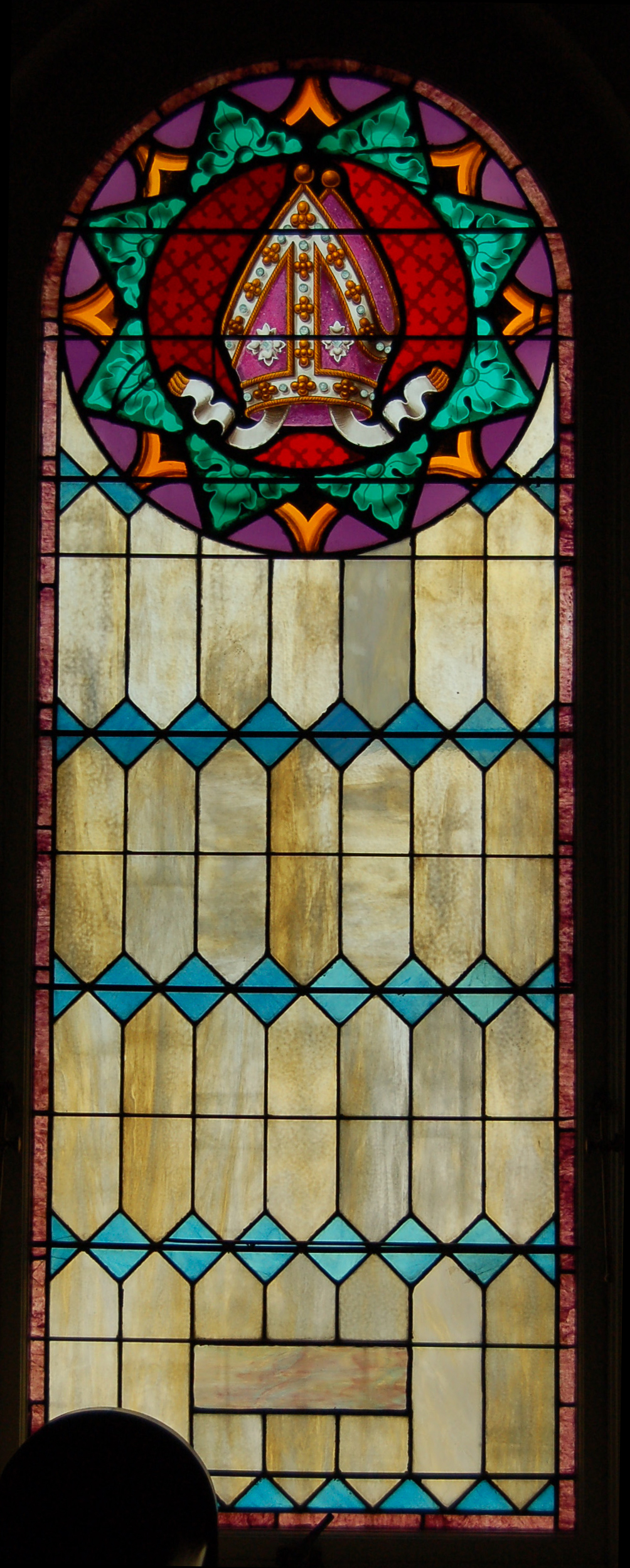
