= Thomas Ewing (American Revolution) =

American Revolutionary War commander (1730–1790)

Colonel Thomas Ewing
- Born: 1730
- Died: 1790
- Spouse: Margaret
- Military career
- Allegiance: United States
- Commands: 3rd Battalion of the Maryland Flying Camp
- Conflicts: Battle of Harlem Heights; Battle of Trenton; Battle of Princeton; American Revolutionary War

Colonel Thomas Ewing (1730-1790) was a commander of the 3rd Battalion of the Maryland Flying Camp under the command of Brigadier General Rezin Beall during the American Revolutionary War. Under Ewing's command were 12 companies of infantry with 864 men and 2 companies of artillery.
