= Flying Camp =

Mobile military force

A flying camp was a military formation employed by the Continental Army in the second half of 1776, during the American Revolutionary War.

== History ==
After the British evacuation of Boston in March 1776, General George Washington met with members of the Continental Congress to determine future military strategy. Faced with defending a huge amount of territory from potential British operations, Washington recommended forming a "flying camp", which in the military terminology of the day referred to a mobile, strategic reserve of troops. Congress agreed and on June 3, 1776, passed a resolution "that a flying camp be immediately established in the middle colonies and that it consist of 10,000 men ...."

The men recruited for the flying camp were to be militiamen from three colonies: 6000 from Pennsylvania, 3400 from Maryland, and 600 from Delaware. They were to serve until December 1, 1776, unless discharged sooner by Congress, and to be paid and fed in the same manner as regular soldiers of the Continental Army.

Congress appropriated $38,500 (in Spanish dollars at 7s 6d [shillings and pence] per paper Continental dollar) for the regiments' support. The pay rate per month was dictated by Congress: Colonel 450s, Lt. colonel 400s, major 350s, captains 300s, lieutenants 200s, ensigns 160s, sergeants 90s, corporals 60s, and privates 50s. Mounted dragoons, artillerymen, and militia serving outside their state received a 2s 6d bonus.

Brigadier-general Hugh Mercer of Virginia was commissioned as its commandant. Samuel Patterson (a miller from Christiana Bridge, Delaware) was appointed its battalion colonel. The town of Christiana Bridge is located on Old Kings Road, which was one of the first major inland routes in the colonies between Baltimore, Maryland, in the South, and Philadelphia, Pennsylvania, in the North. The flying camp was to be composed of troops from Maryland, Pennsylvania, and Delaware for the immediate defense of New Jersey while the main army focused on the defense of New York. No such numbers were ever realized for this purpose, the total being under 6000, but Maryland and tiny Delaware seemingly managed to fulfill their quotas. Delaware was assigned to provide 600 men from among those it had already recruited for one year, and the unit was to be "engaged to the first day of December next [1776]". Pennsylvania sent some 2,000 men, many of whom were quickly drafted into other service by Washington in New York.

== Battalions ==
A list of the flying camp battalions initially formed in Delaware, Maryland, and Pennsylvania in 1776 includes (Miller):

- Delaware: 1st Battalion Flying Camp (Haslet's)
- Maryland: First Battalion (Colonel Charles Greenbury Griffith)
- Maryland: Second Battalion (Colonel Josias Carvil Hall)
- Maryland: Third Battalion (Colonel Thomas Ewing)
- Maryland: Fourth Battalion (Colonel William Richardson)
- Pennsylvania: 1st Regiment Flying Camp (Colonel Montgomery)
- Pennsylvania: 2d Regiment Flying Camp (McAllister's)
- Pennsylvania: Baxter's Battalion Flying Camp
- Pennsylvania: Clotz' Battalion Flying Camp, Lancaster County
- Pennsylvania: Haller's Battalion Flying Camp
- Pennsylvania: Watt's Regiment Flying Camp
- Pennsylvania: Craig's Regiment Flying Camp - Commanding Baxter's

A further Maryland and Virginia rifle regiment (of the flying camp) was authorized June 17, 1776 but was assigned to the main army. The regiment was to consist of the three existing companies, two from Maryland and one from Virginia, plus two new companies to be raised in Maryland, and four new companies to be raised in Virginia. Captain Daniel Morgan's company enlisted in (West) Virginia was the first from the South to reach the field. A German battalion, unofficially referred to as the 8th Maryland Regiment, composed of eight companies from Pennsylvania and Maryland was also enlisted. Several Maryland militia companies were mustered into service and attached to the 400 that made up the Maryland Line (1st Maryland Regiment) and was ordered to New York, on July 4, 1776. There the Marylanders and those from Delaware took part in the fight at Brooklyn Heights. This was their first fighting in the war and a very costly battle for them as well. The soldiers from Delaware, fighting alongside the 1st Maryland Regiment, may well have prevented the capture of the majority of Washington's army, an event that might have ended the colonial rebellion. Some 300 of the 400 men from Maryland died, along with 31 of the men from Delaware. The British buried the dead in a mass grave consisting of six trenches in a farm field. Ultimately, of the original Maryland muster, 96 returned, with only 35 fit for immediate duty. Historian Thomas Field, writing in 1869, called the stand of these troops "an hour more precious to liberty than any other in history".

Montgomery's and McAllister's Pennsylvanians were mostly made prisoner at the fall of Fort Washington. The remainder of the Pennsylvania Flying Camp marched home. Despite the best efforts of General Mercer, the flying camp was fraught with difficulties almost from its inception, and never realizing its full potential. Colonel Patterson tallied the number of men remaining during the retreat across New Jersey at 461 (officers included) when the flying camp battalion arrived at Perth Amboy on October 5, and at 480 of all ranks five days later. It was disbanded by the end of November. (Volo & Volo)

The flying camp was an early and short-lived experiment with the concept of extra Continental regiments, a "national" rather than a "confederate" force, which was to be distinct as having formed without any administrative connection to any individual state. Sixteen additional Continental regiments were approved by Congress as a separate group on December 27, 1776, specifically in response to a request from Washington for more troops other than mere militia, and Congress expressly delegated the formation of these regulars directly to him. All additional Continental regiments were organized in the spring and summer of 1777. In contrast to both the extra and additional regiments, all other infantry regiments of the army were organized and supported under the direct authority of individual state governments .
