= Conowingo =

Conowingo may refer to:

- Conowingo, Maryland, a community in Cecil County
- Conowingo Dam, on the Susquehanna River
- Conowingo Bridge, formerly across the Susquehanna River
