= Louis Wernwag =

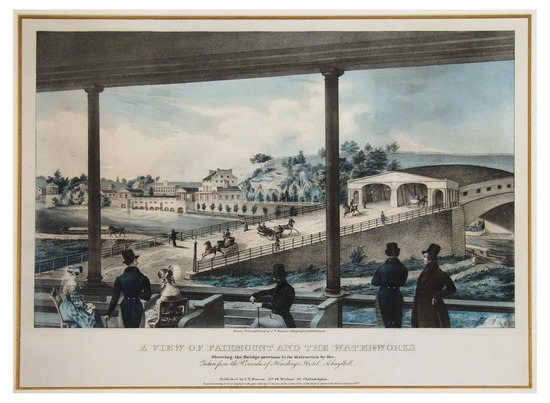
1835 lithograph, Colossus bridge, of Fairmount Water Works in Philadelphia, built in part by Wernwag

Louis Wernag (December 4, 1769 in Altenburg, Württemberg, Holy Roman Empire – August 12, 1843 in Hapers Ferry, Virginia) was a bridge builder in the United States in the early 19th century.

== Early life ==
On leaving school, in order to evade military service, he was secreted by a shepherd in the mountains, who directed his attention to the study of astronomy, natural history, and other scientific subjects. In 1786, he made his way to Amsterdam and then to Philadelphia.

== United States ==
His earliest venture in the United States was the building of a machine for making whetstones. Soon afterward he began to build power mills and bridges. While conducting this business he purchased land containing large quantities of white oak and pine timber in New Jersey, from which he got out, about 1809, the keel for the first U. S. frigate built at the Philadelphia Navy Yard.

=== Bridges ===
In 1810 he erected a bridge across Neshaminy Creek on the road between Philadelphia and New York City. The following year, he built a drawbridge across Frankford Creek at Bridgeburg, a "cantilever" type with a center panel that could be raised to allow vessels with tall masts through.

His third wood bridge was built across the Schuylkill River in 1812-13 at Philadelphia. This structure, known as the "Colossus of Fairmount," consisted of a single arch, the span of which was 340 feet. In consideration of its length of span — the longest ever erected for a wooden bridge — solidity and strength, "The Colossus" was regarded as one of the wonders of the world. (It was destroyed by fire on September 1, 1838.)

In 1813, he built a bridge across the Delaware River in New Hope, Pennsylvania, which was 32 feet wide and had two wagon lanes and two lanes for pedestrians. He constructed the first Conowingo Bridge in 1818 and rebuilt Theodore Burr's Port Deposit Bridge in 1824, both crossings of the Susquehanna River in Maryland.

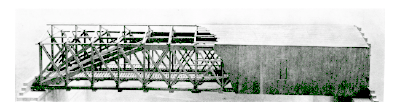
Model of Latrobe Truss built at Harper's Ferry in 1836-37 by Louis Wernwag

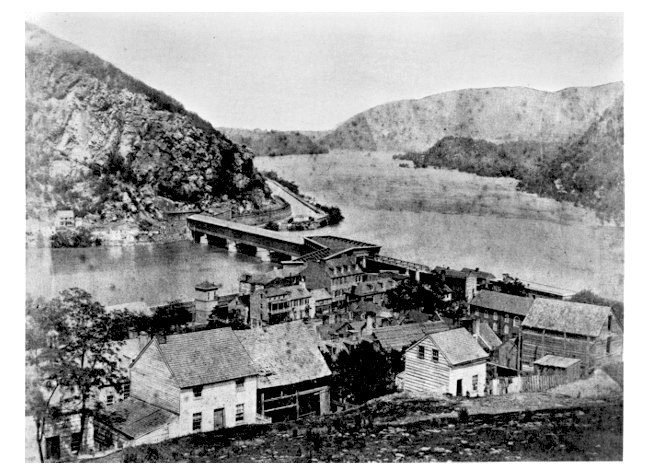
1860 Baltimore & Ohio Bridge at Harper's Ferry with Latrobe and Bollman Trusses

In 1836, Benjamin Henry Latrobe II designed the first viaduct and bridge over the Chesapeake and Ohio Canal and Potomac River at Harper's Ferry, Virginia, now West Virginia, for the Baltimore and Ohio Railroad. The bridge, a wooden truss structure, was built by Wernwag in 1836-1837.

Over his 27-year career, Wernwag built 29 bridges. These are listed in the Engineering News of August 15, 1885, p. 99.

=== Nails and coal ===
In 1813 he moved to Phoenixville, Pennsylvania, where he took an interest in and charge of the Phoenix Nail Works, and there invented the first machine for cutting and heading spikes from four to seven inches in length. The other machinery was also remodelled and greatly improved by him. He purchased coal lands near Pottsville, which led to his experimenting toward the use of anthracite coal. At first he found it almost impossible to ignite it, but he discovered that, by closing the furnace-doors and introducing air from beneath, combustion was possible. He was sanguine of its ultimate use for fuel, and while the Philadelphians drove from the city the person that offered to sell it, believing he offered stone for coal, he invented and used in his own residence a stove for burning it.

=== Water works ===
The canals of the Schuylkill Navigation Company, some of the first in the United States, were partially constructed by him, and the Fairmount Water Works and dam at Philadelphia were erected in accordance with his plans. In 1819 he moved to Conowingo, Maryland, where he built a bridge and double saw mill, and prepared the timber for many bridges. Five years later, he moved to Harper's Ferry and purchased the Isle of Virginius, where he continued his business of preparing timber for bridges.
