= Spring Garden Street Bridge =

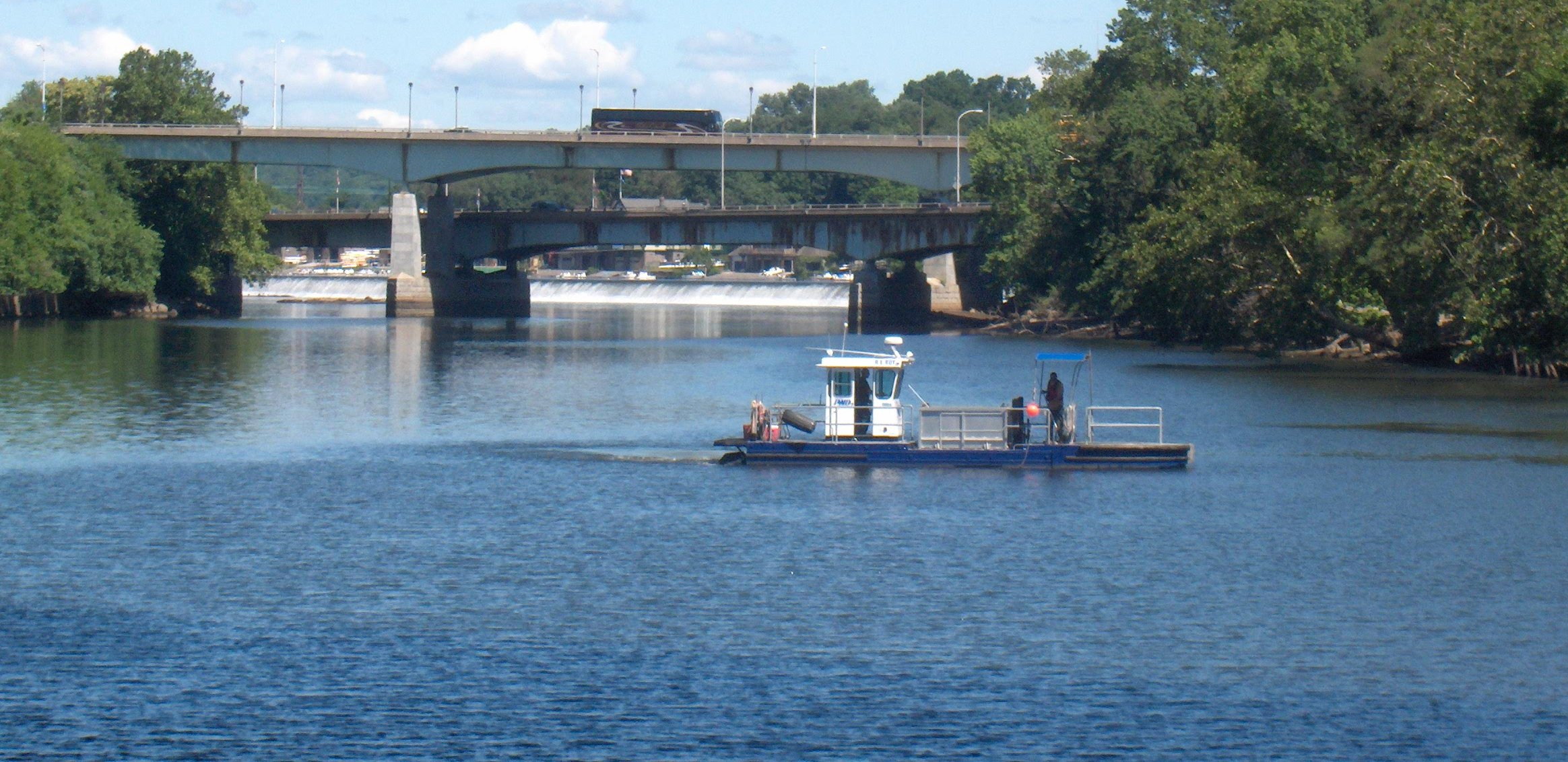
- The Spring Garden Street Bridge (July 2010), with the West River Drive Bridge crossing beneath it and Fairmount Dam in the background.
- Coordinates: 39°57′52″N 75°11′00″W
- Crosses: Schuylkill River
- Locale: Philadelphia, Pennsylvania, United States

History
- Designer: Richard Wisniewski
- Opened: 1965

Location
- Interactive map of Spring Garden Street Bridge

Spring Garden Street Bridge is a highway bridge in Philadelphia, Pennsylvania. It crosses the Schuylkill River below Fairmount Dam and connects West Philadelphia to the Philadelphia Museum of Art and Benjamin Franklin Parkway. It is the fourth bridge at this location.

The bridge is located at 39°57′52″N 75°11′00″W.

== 1st bridge: The Colossus ==
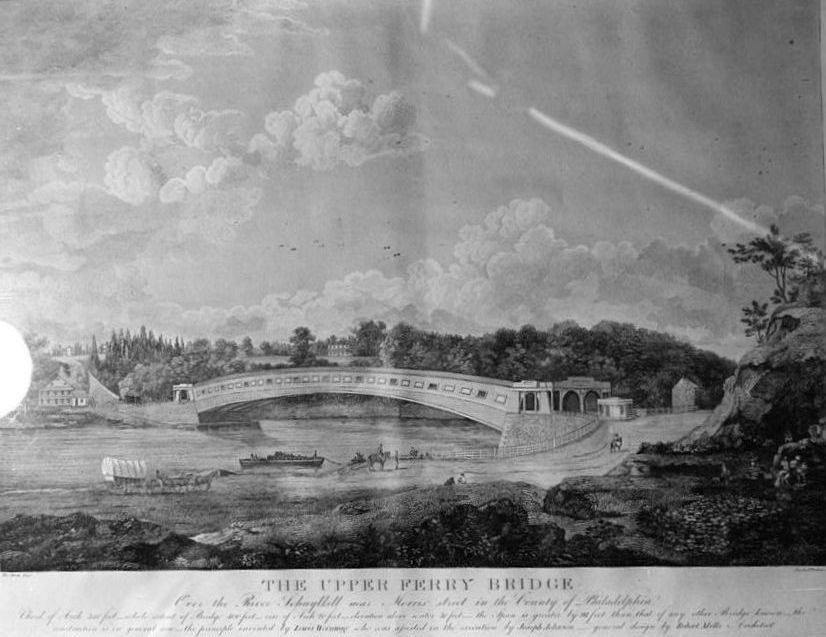
The Upper Ferry Bridge in an 1813 engraving. "The Colossus" (1813) had the longest single-span of any wooden bridge in the United States.

As early as 1693, a ferry operated, crossing the Schuylkill River at Fairmount, the hill on which the Philadelphia Museum of Art now stands. Being upstream of the others, this was called the Upper Ferry.

For the Upper Ferry site, bridge builder Louis Wernwag designed and built a single-span laminated timber arch—known as the "Colossus of Fairmount," the "Upper Ferry Bridge," or the "Lancaster Schuylkill Bridge"—with a clear span of about 340 ft (100 m) and an overall length of roughly 400 ft; construction began in April 1812, it opened on January 7, 1813, and it was destroyed by fire on September 1, 1838.

Thomas Birch painted at least two views of the bridge, and one of them was made into an 1813 engraving by Jacob J. Plocher. This "Upper Ferry Bridge" engraving was copied frequently on Staffordshire china.

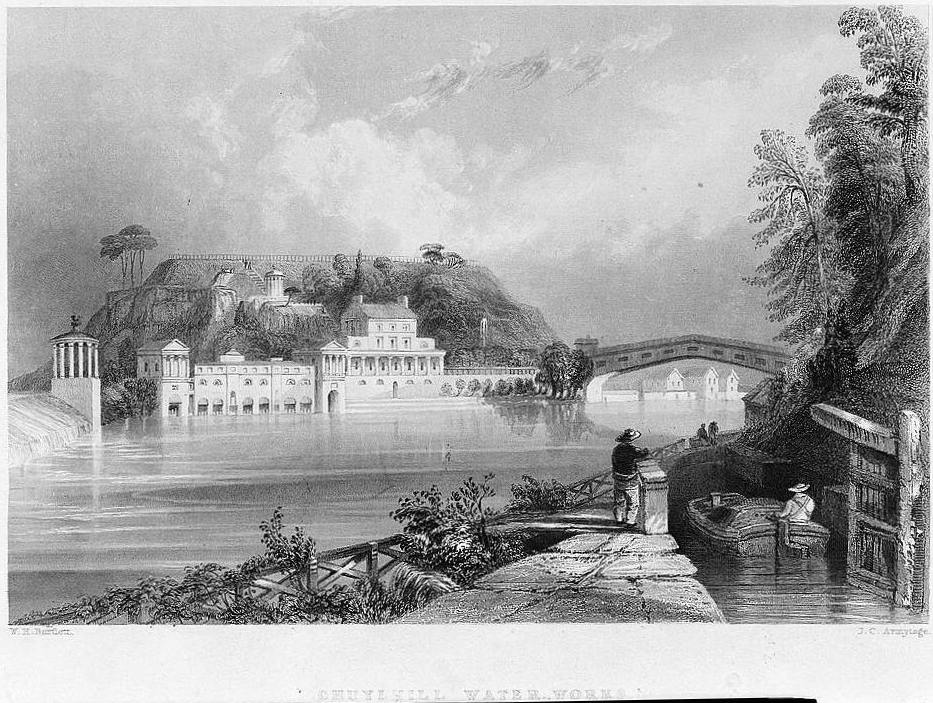
"Schuylkill Waterworks" (1835), with "The Colossus" in the background.

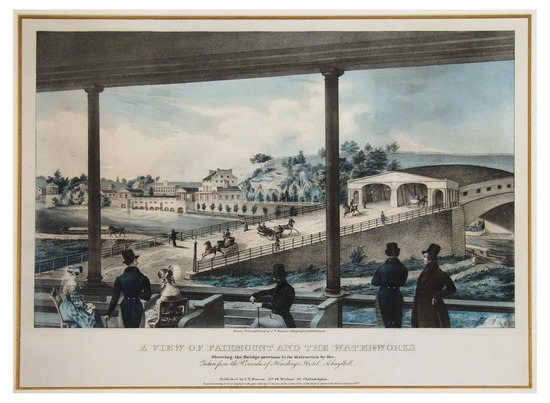
"A View of Fairmount and the Waterworks" (1835) by John Rubens Smith.

== 2nd bridge: Wire Bridge at Fairmount ==
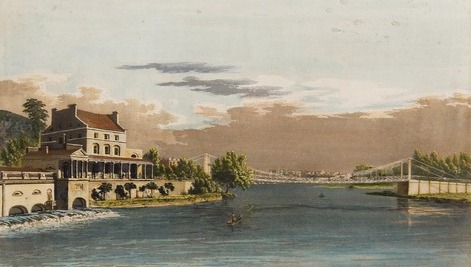
"The New Suspension Bridge at Fairmount, Philadelphia" (1842). This was the first major wire-cable suspension bridge built in the United States.

Five miles upstream from Fairmount, iron manufacturers Josiah White and Erksine Hazard built a wire-cable footbridge in 1816. Though a modest structure – 407 feet (124 m) in length with a suspended walkway 18 inches (0.46 m) wide – and a temporary one – it stood for less than a year – the Spider Bridge at Falls of Schuylkill is thought to have been the first wire-cable suspension bridge in history.

Twenty-five years later, permanent wire-cable suspension bridges had been built in France and Switzerland. To replace "The Colossus," Charles Ellet, Jr. designed the first major wire-cable suspension bridge in the United States. The 358-foot-long (109 m) "Wire Bridge at Fairmount" was commissioned by the City of Philadelphia, and opened to traffic on January 2, 1842. It had no toll, and stood for over thirty years.

Ellet would go on to design the 1,010-foot (310 m) Wheeling Suspension Bridge (1847–49); and the first Niagara Falls Suspension Bridge (1847–48), which was abandoned before completion.

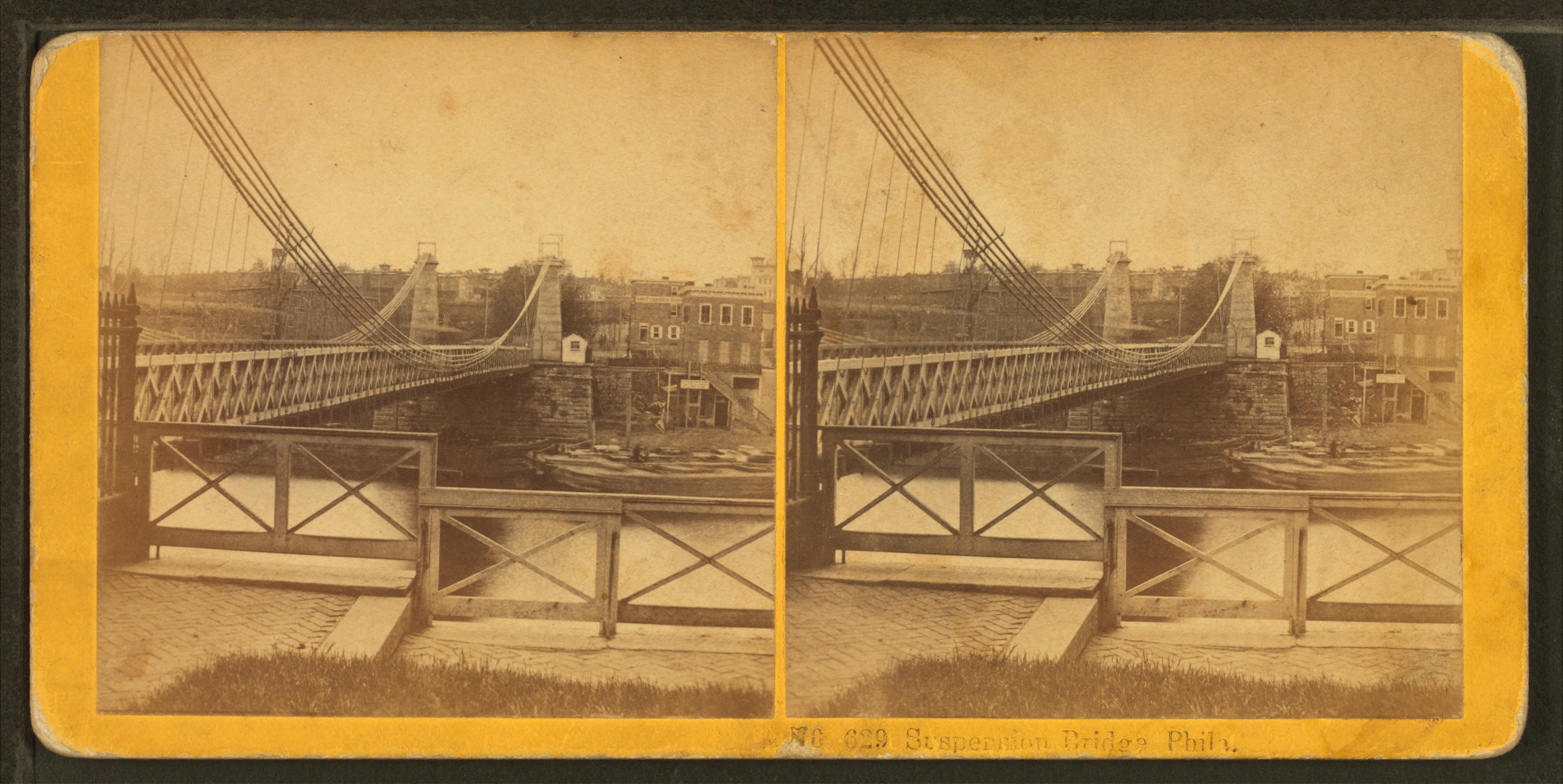
Wire Bridge at Fairmount.

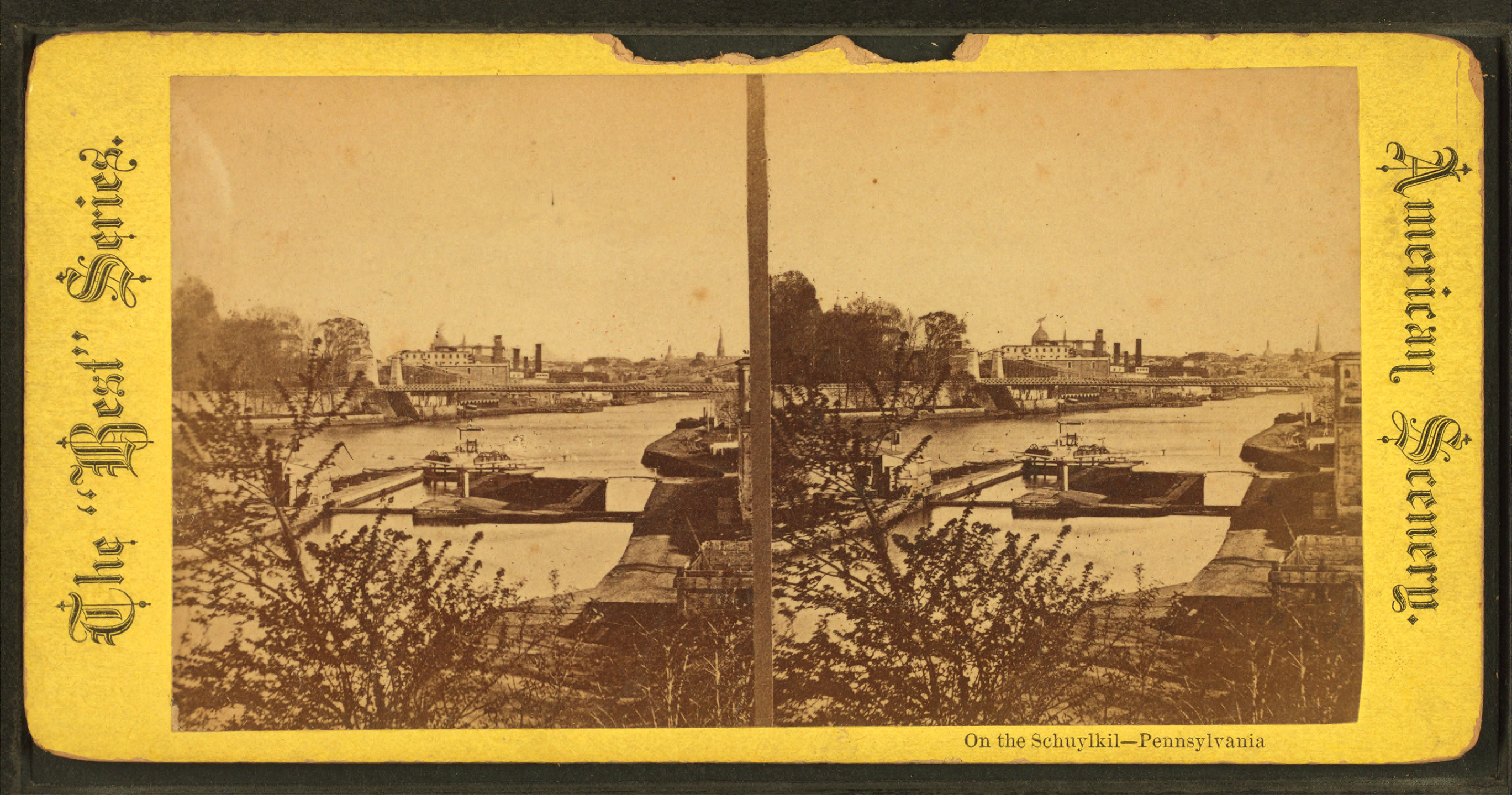
Wire Bridge from mouth of Schuylkill Canal.

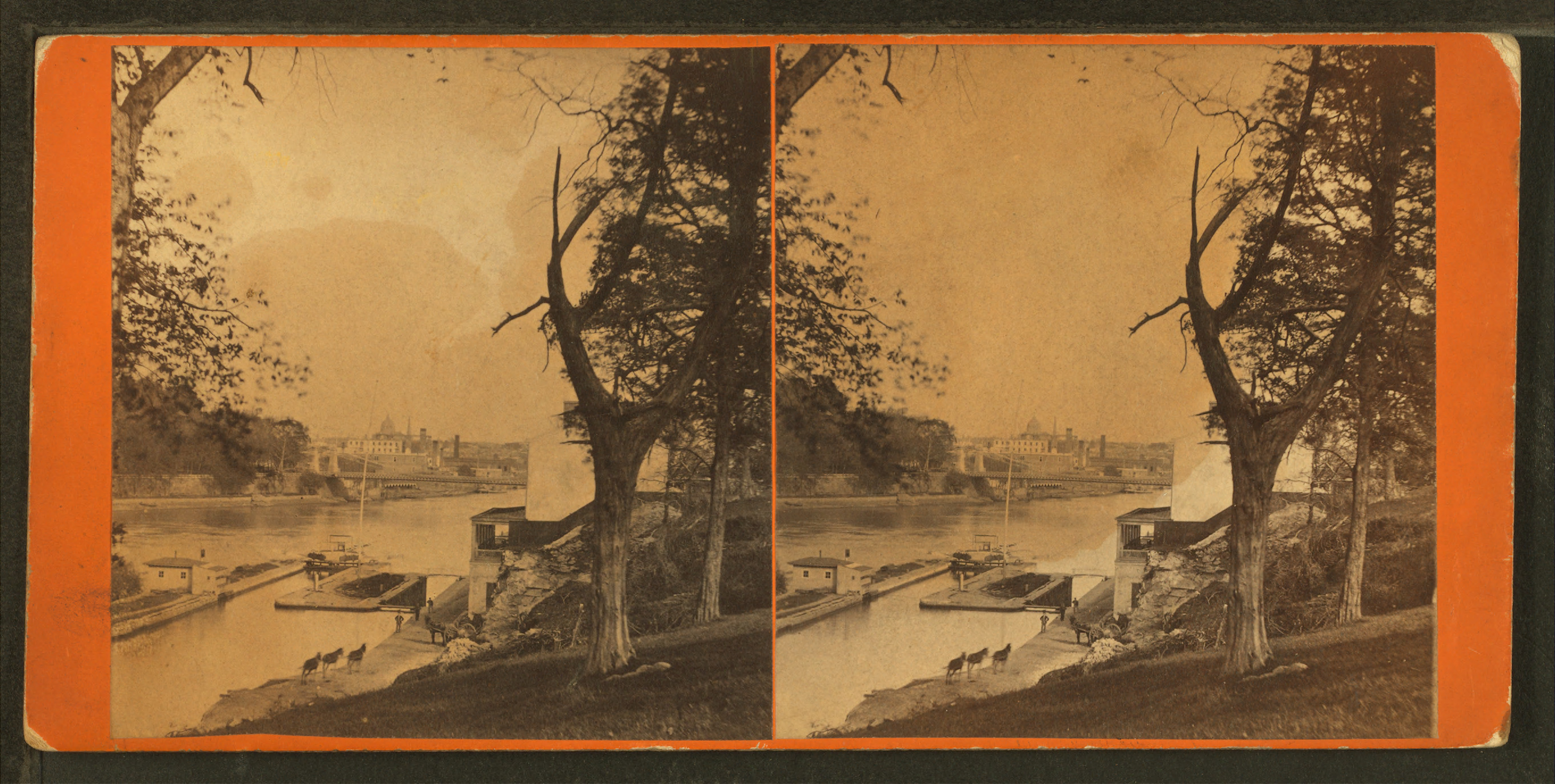
Wire Bridge from mouth of Schuylkill Canal.

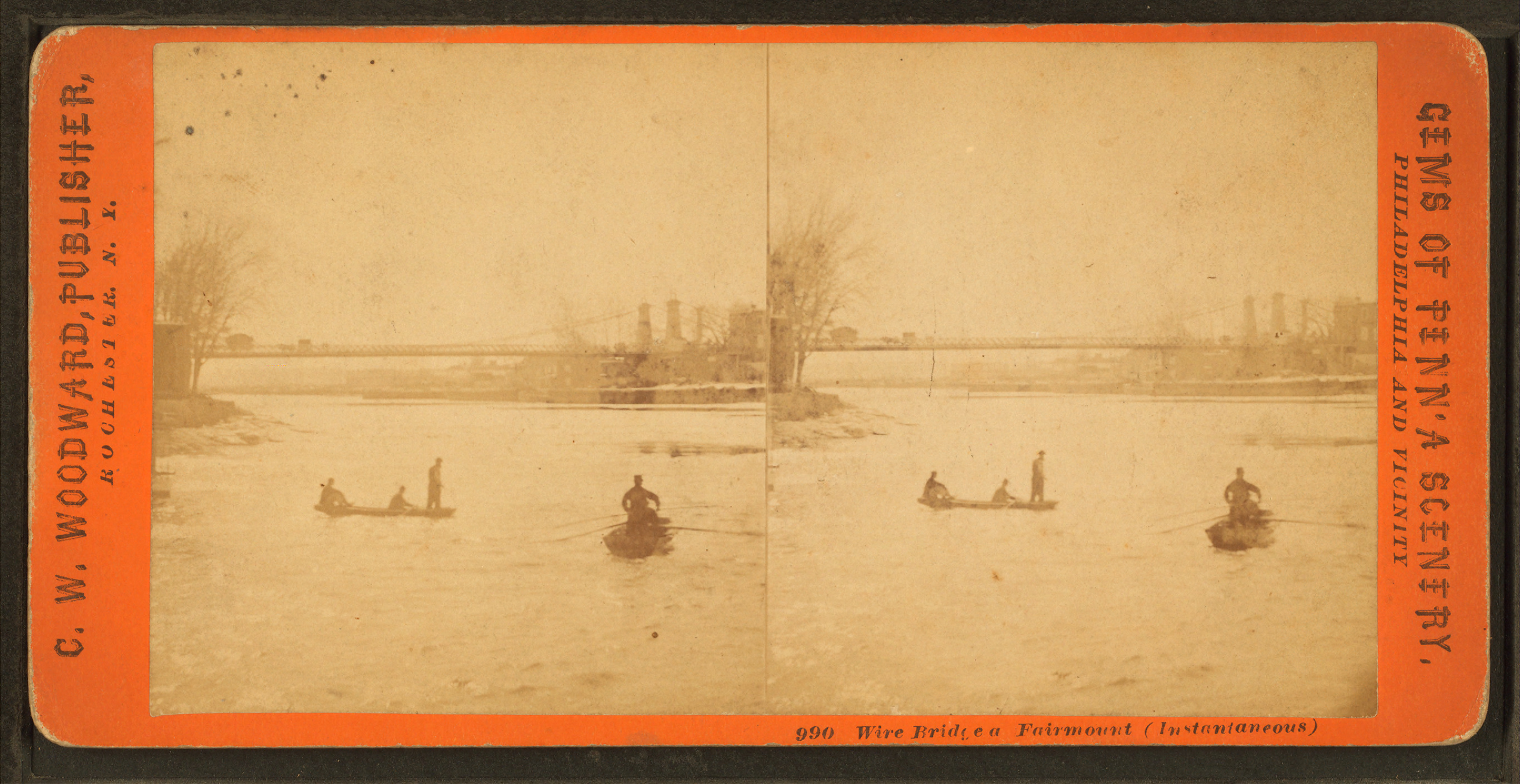
Wire Bridge from Schuylkill River.

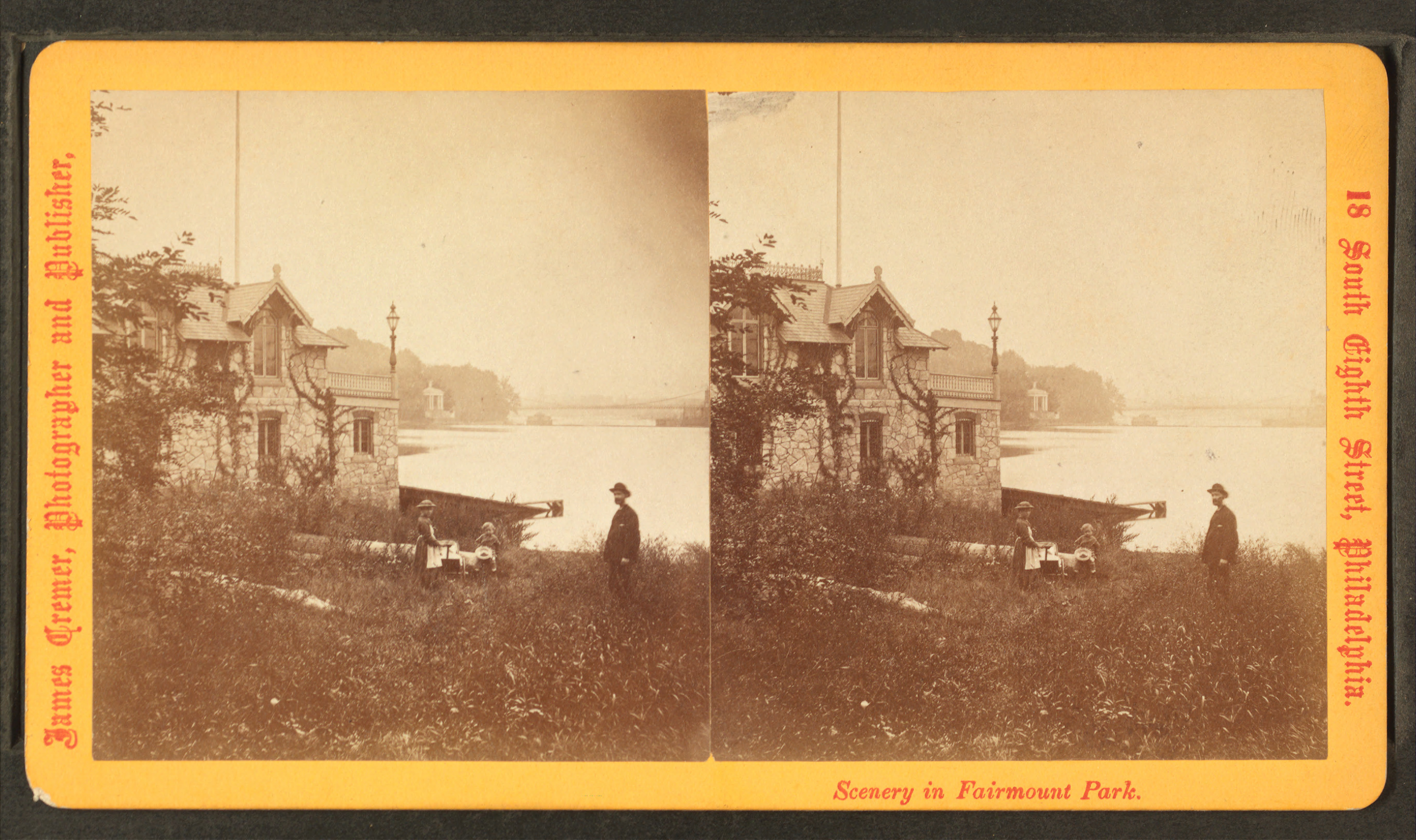
Wire Bridge from Boathouse Row.

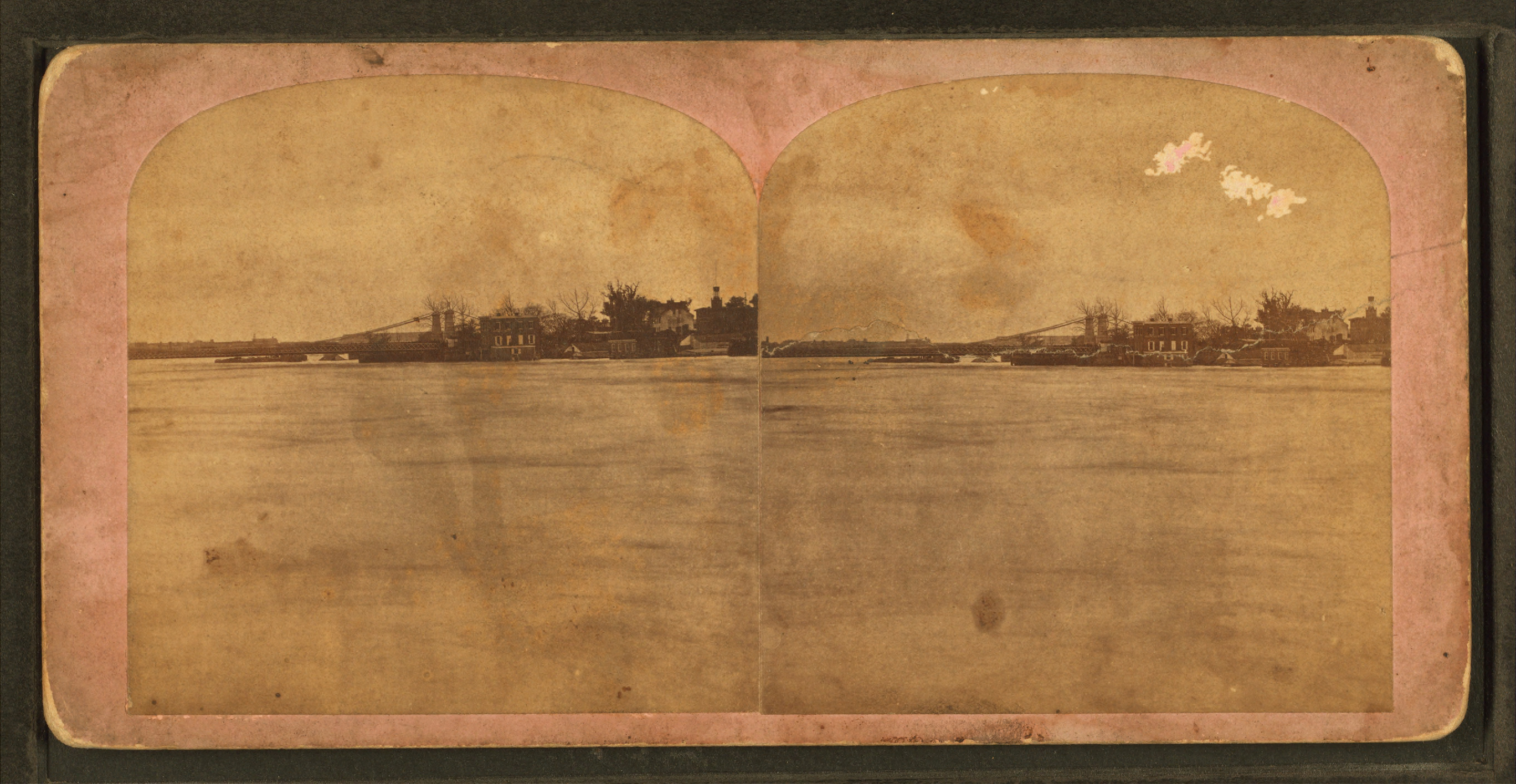
Wire Bridge from Boathouse Row.

== 3rd bridge: Callowhill Street Bridge ==
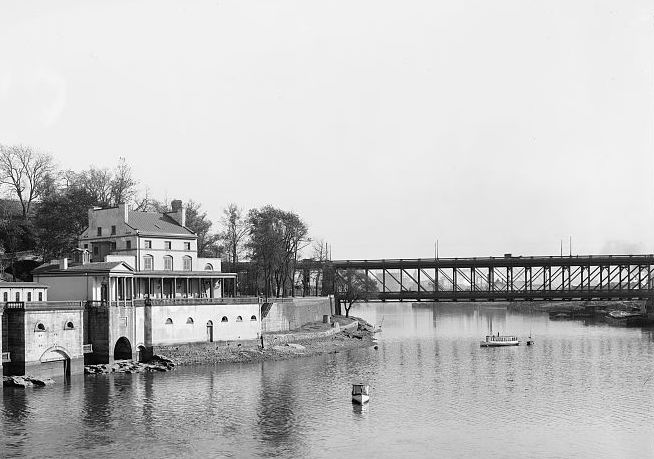
Callowhill Street Bridge (1874-75), in a circa 1901 photograph.

The Callowhill Street Bridge was designed by Jacob H. Linville, engineer, and built by the Keystone Bridge Company, 1874–75. A double-decker bridge that carried passengers, vehicles and streetcars on its upper deck and trains (later removed) on its lower, it was a Whipple truss of cast and wrought iron, 350 feet (110 m) long and 48 feet (15 m) wide. The arches between the decks were decorative and removed circa 1900; the ornate railings were removed by 1910. It was demolished in 1964.

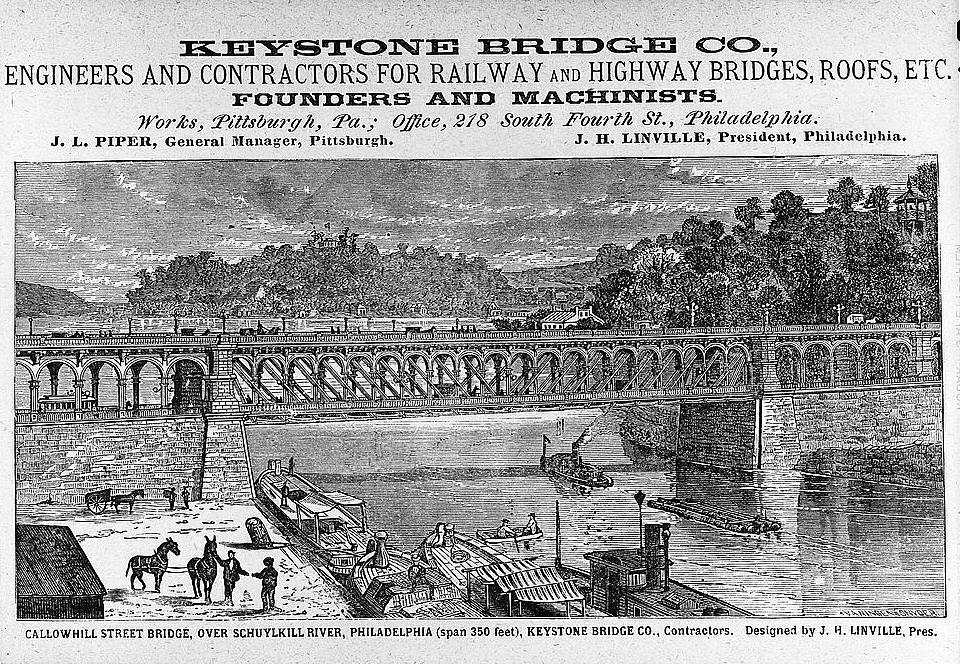
Callowhill Street Bridge in an 1875 advertisement.

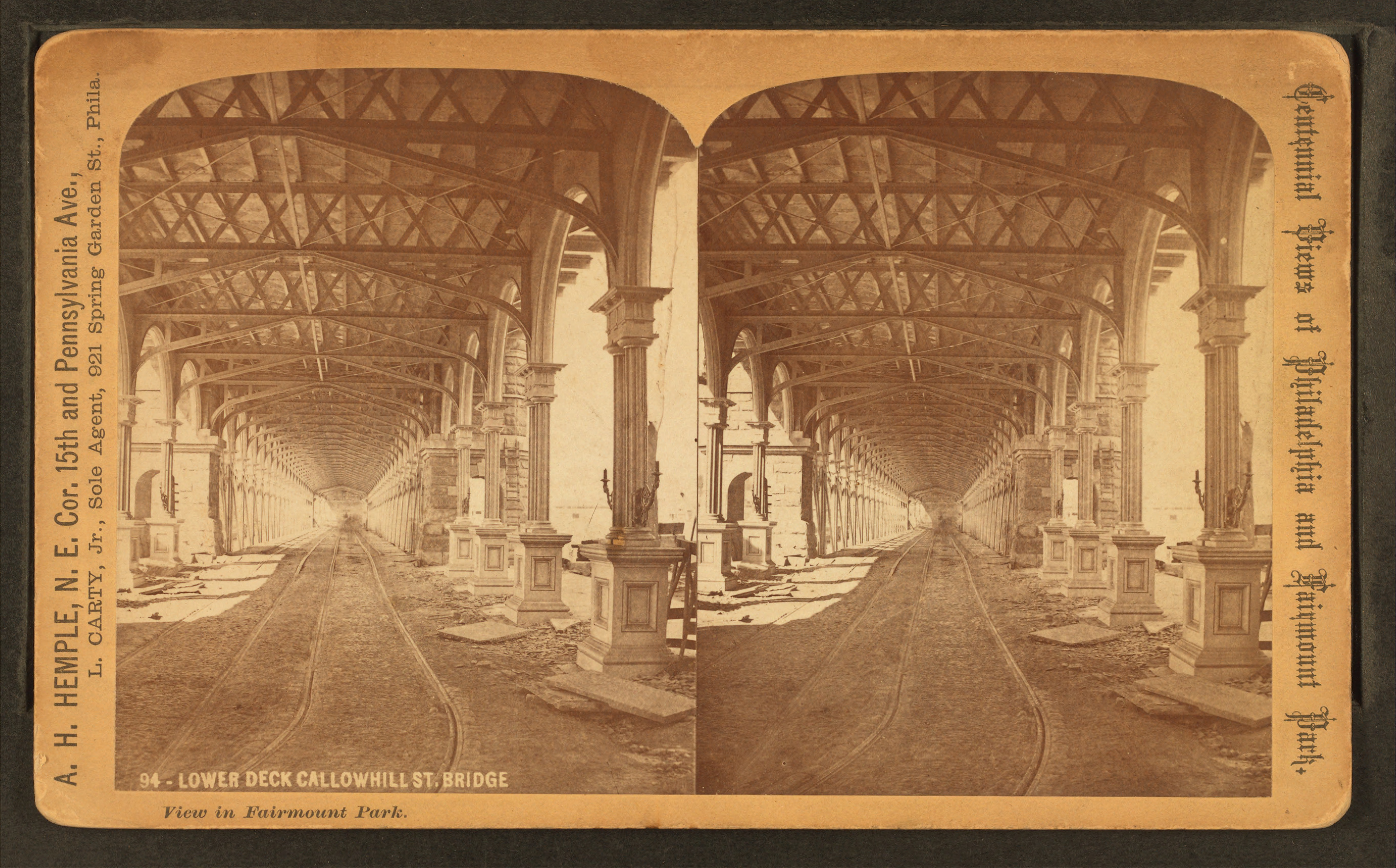
Callowhill Street Bridge, lower deck.

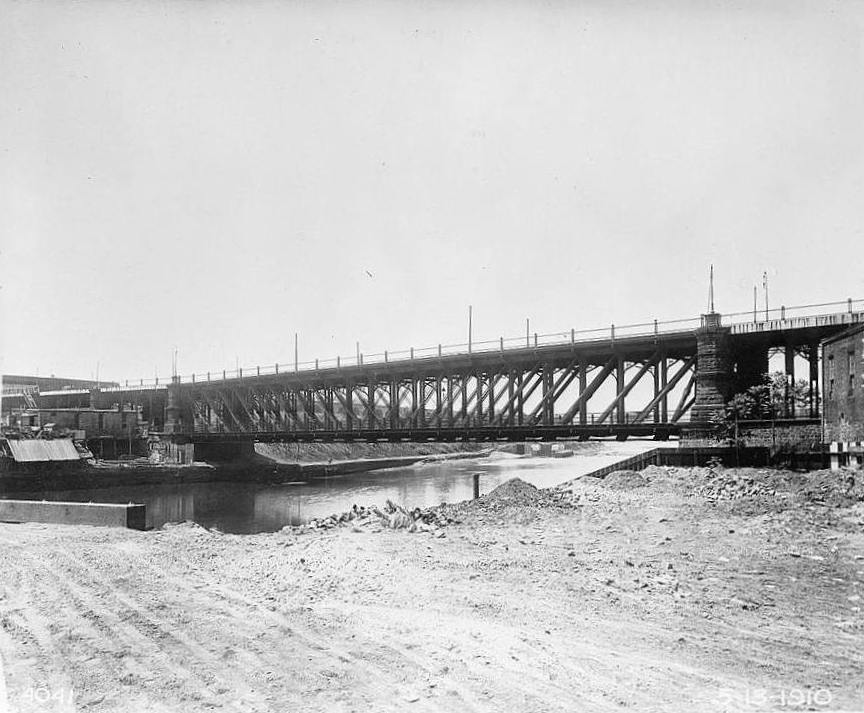
Callowhill Street Bridge in 1910.

== 4th bridge: Spring Garden Street Bridge ==
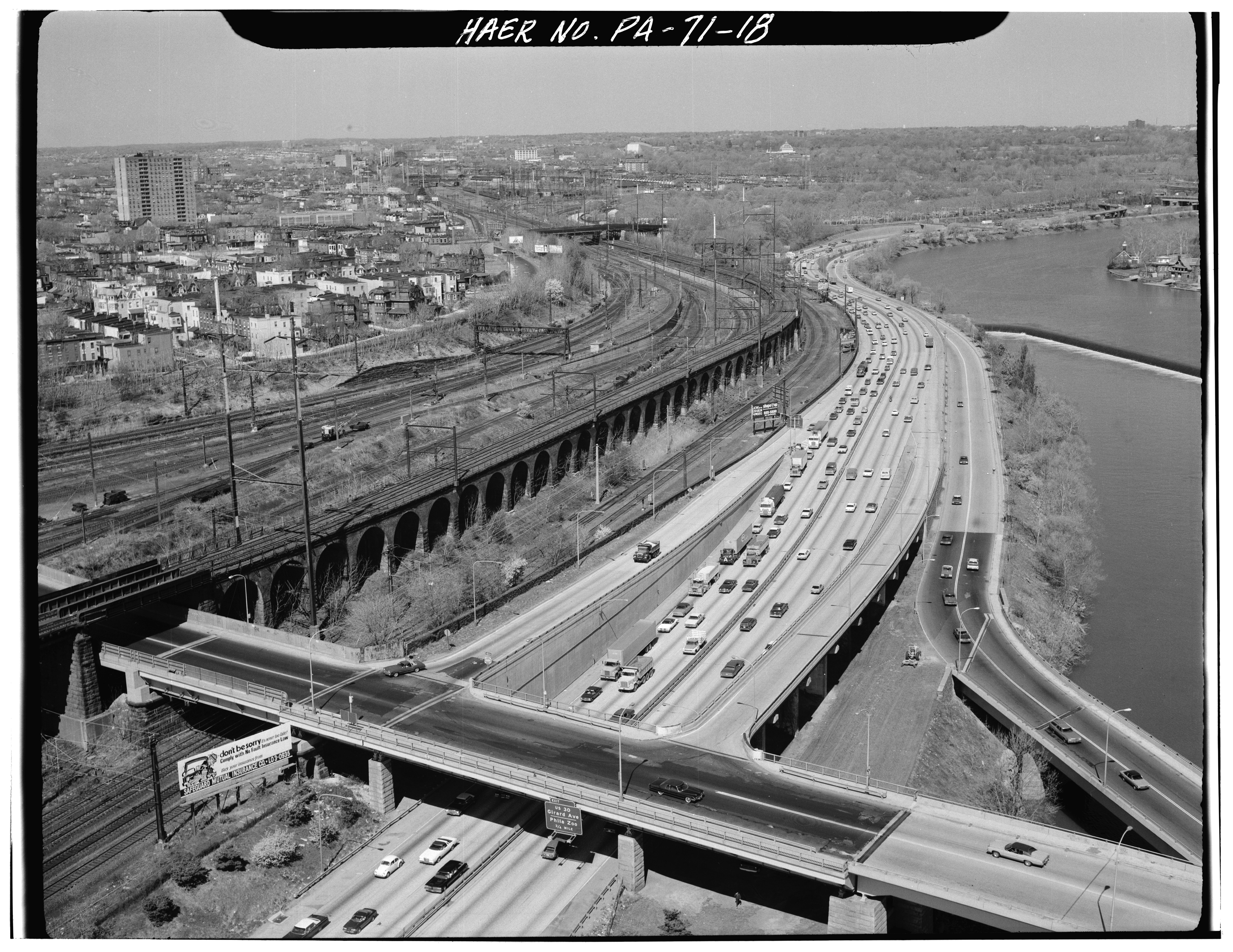
Spring Garden Street Bridge in 1977.

The current bridge was designed by Richard Wisniewski of Philadelphia, and completed in 1965. It carries West Spring Garden Street over the Pennsylvania Railroad lines, the Schuylkill Expressway, the Schuylkill River, and the Schuylkill River Trail. The West River Drive Bridge crosses diagonally beneath it, carrying the Dr. Martin Luther King, Jr., Drive over the Schuylkill River.

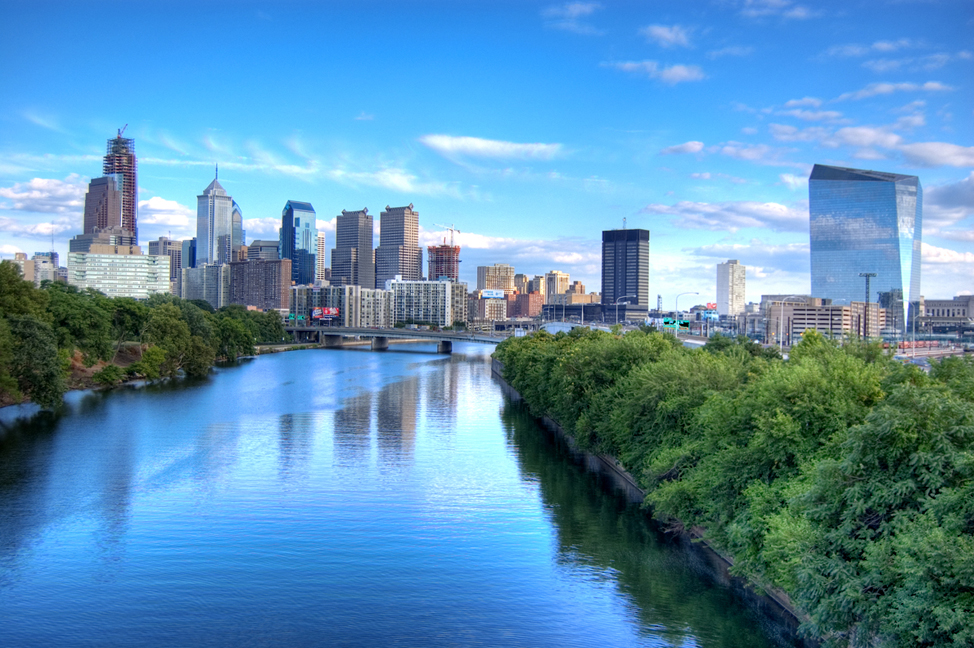
Looking southeast from the Spring Garden Street Bridge.

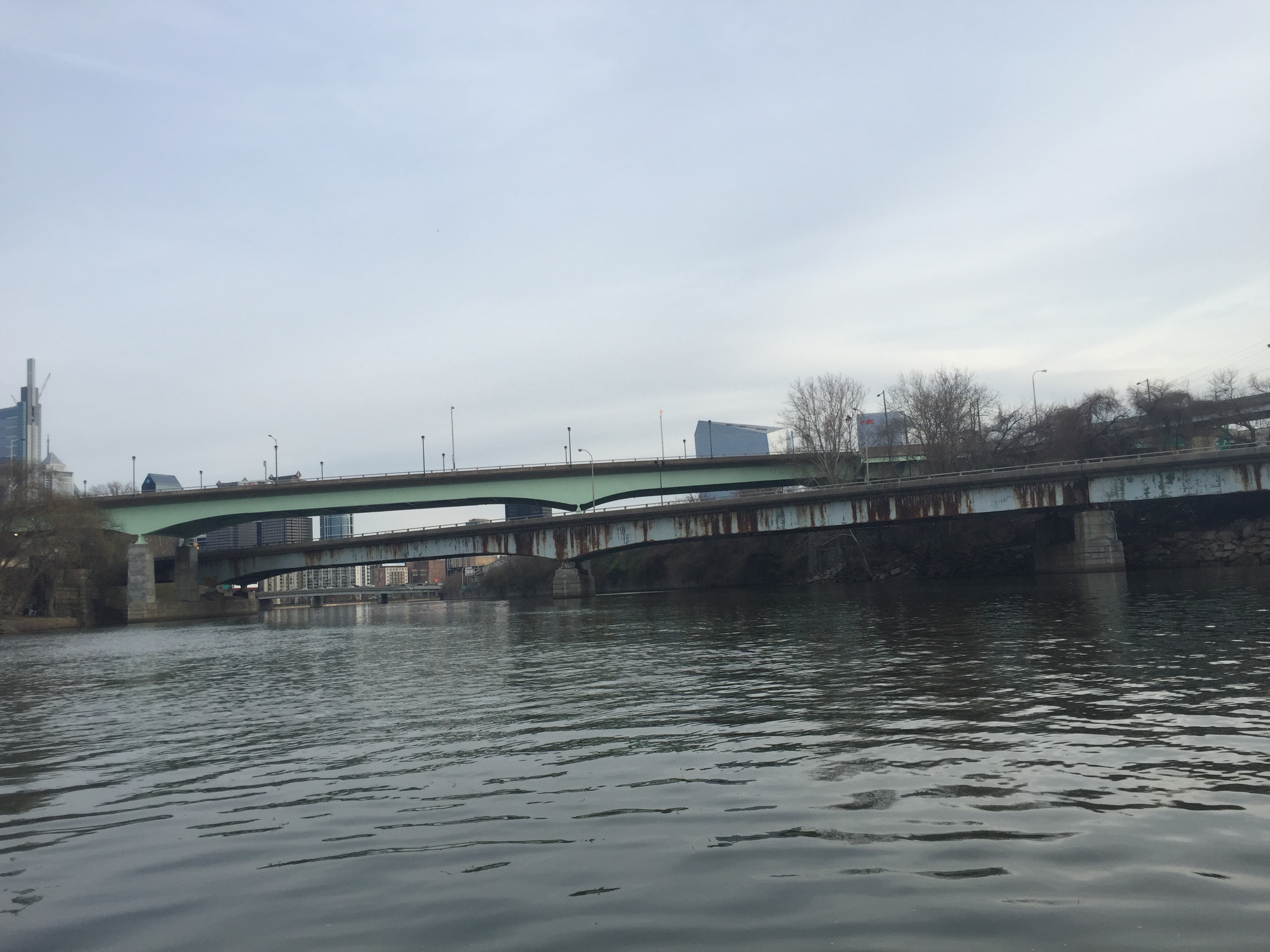
As seen from a kayak on the Schuylkill River. The Spring Garden Street Bridge is the upper of the two.

== See also ==
- List of bridges documented by the Historic American Engineering Record in Pennsylvania
- List of crossings of the Schuylkill River
- Spring Garden Street Tunnel
