= Theodore Burr House =

Historic house in New York, United States

- U.S. National Register of Historic Places
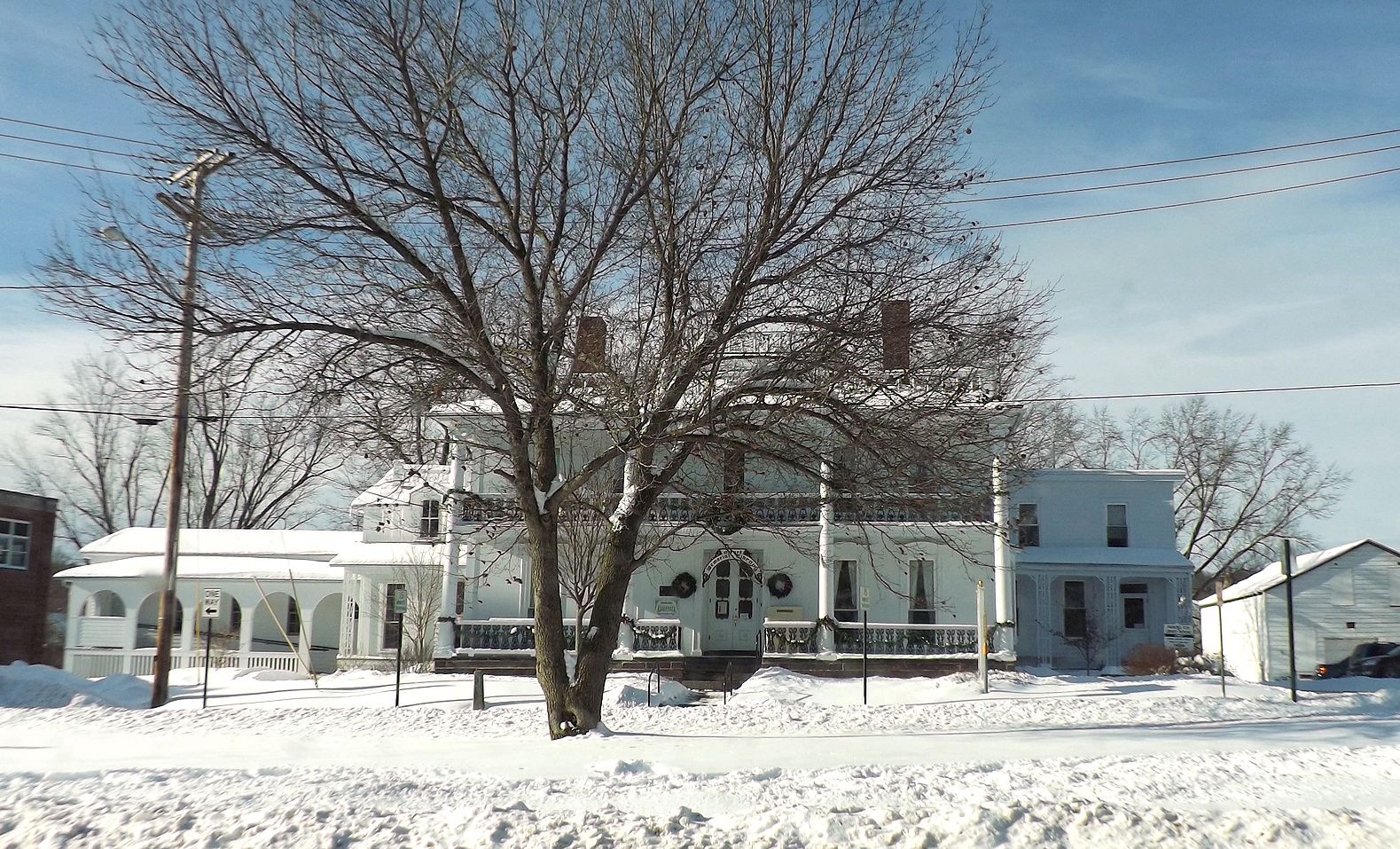
- The house in December 2012.

- Location within New York
- Location: Fort Hill Sq., Oxford, New York
- Coordinates: 42°26′27″N 75°35′48″W
- Area: less than one acre
- Built: 1810
- Architect: Burr, Theodore
- Architectural style: Greek Revival, Federal
- NRHP reference No.: 81000402
- Added to NRHP: September 11, 1981

Theodore Burr House (also known as Oxford Memorial Library) is a historic home located at Oxford in Chenango County, New York. It is a box like, wood-frame 2-story building with recessed 1 1/2-story wings. It was built between 1810 and 1812 by Theodore Burr (1771–1822), one of the founding settlers of Oxford. It was a private residence until 1843, then a rectory until 1900 when it became the public library building.

It was added to the National Register of Historic Places on September 11, 1981.
