= MLK Drive Bridge =

Bridge in Philadelphia, Pennsylvania, United States

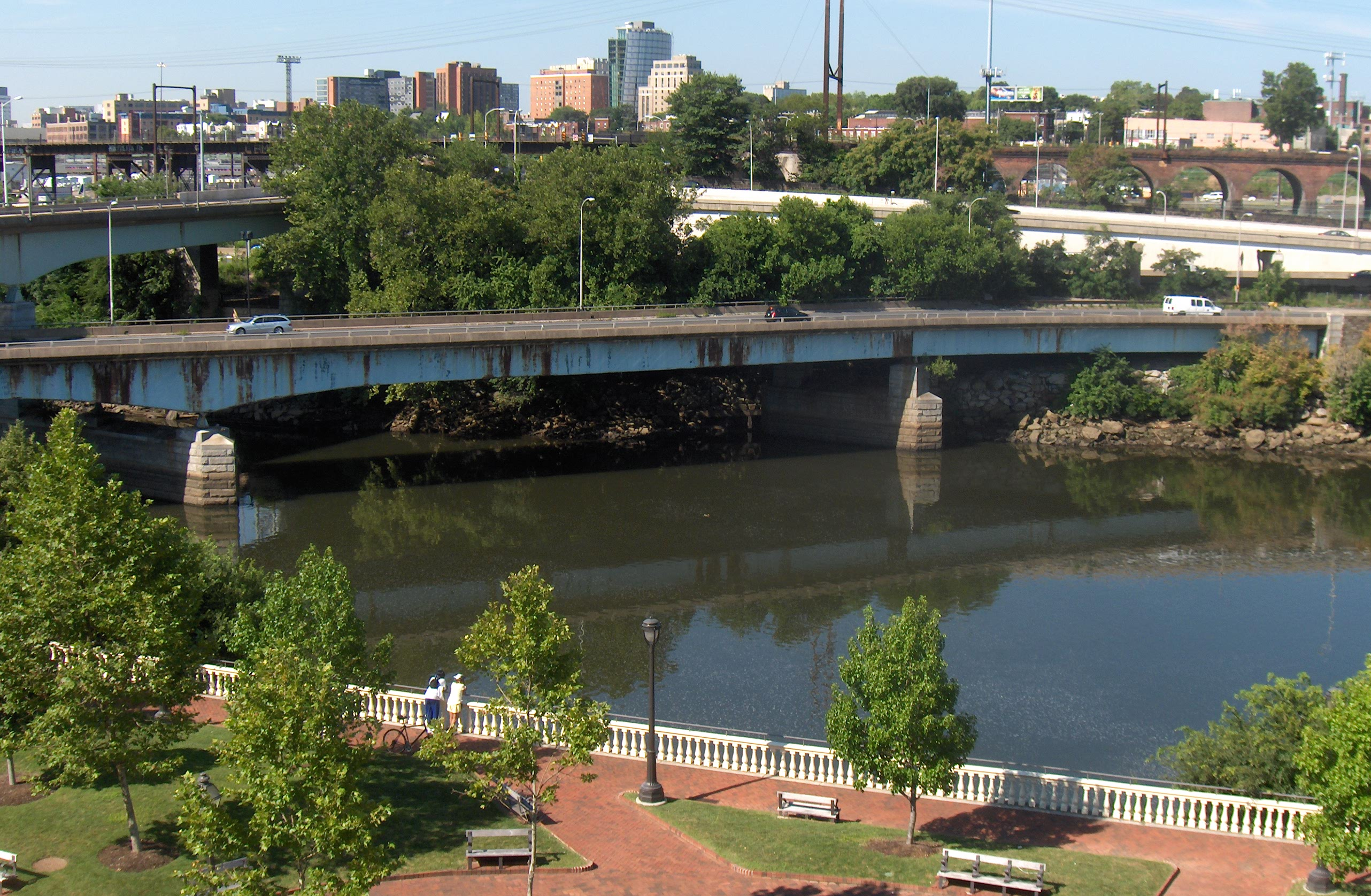
- The lower bridge is the West River Drive Bridge, seen from the Art Museum Drive.
- Coordinates: 39.96449°N 75.18389°W
- Carries: Martin Luther King, Jr. Drive
- Crosses: Schuylkill River, Schuylkill River Trail
- Locale: Philadelphia, Pennsylvania
- Official name: Martin Luther King, Jr. Drive Bridge
- Other name: West River Drive Bridge
- Owner: Pennsylvania Department of Transportation
- Maintained by: PennDOT
- ID number: 677301025000120

Characteristics
- Design: girder
- Material: Steel, concrete
- Total length: 701.1 feet
- Width: 36.1 feet
- No. of spans: 3
- Piers in water: 2

History
- Opened: 1966

Location
- Interactive map of MLK Drive Bridge

The MLK Drive Bridge is a steel girder bridge built in 1966 over the Schuylkill River on Martin Luther King, Jr. Drive (formerly known as West River Drive) in Philadelphia, Pennsylvania. The Pennsylvania Department of Transportation owns and maintains the bridge. The western end of this bridge is upstream from the western end of the Spring Garden Street Bridge, but the eastern end of this bridge is downstream from the eastern end of the Spring Garden Street Bridge.

The bridge was closed to all traffic in 2023 to 2025. The bridge's rehabilitation includes expanding the width at street level, providing space for a dedicated bicycle and pedestrian lane which will connect to the MLK Drive trail; the $20.1 million project was funded by the Bridge Formula Program grant included in the federal Infrastructure Investment and Jobs Act signed into law by President Joe Biden.

== Gallery ==
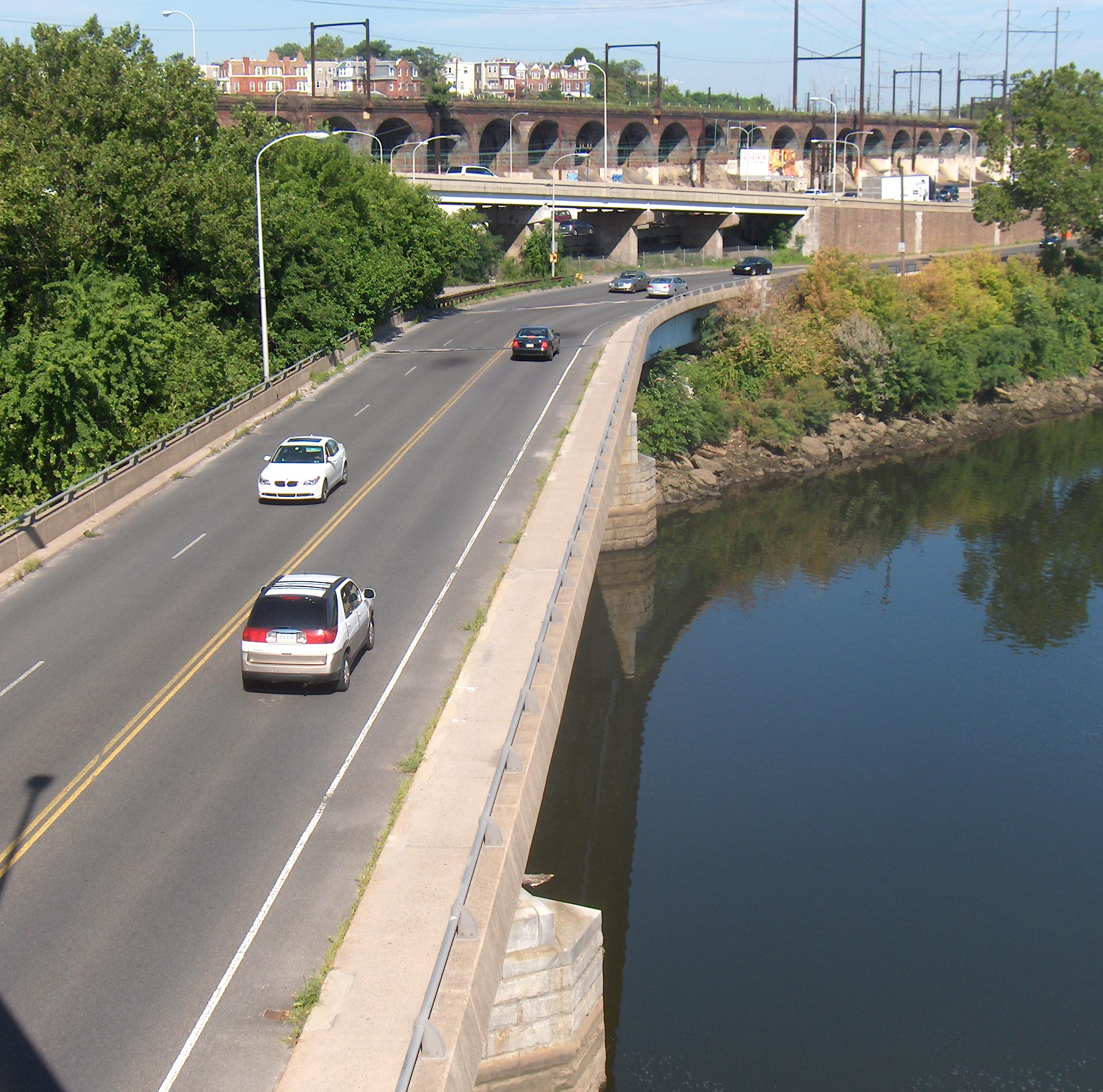
MLK Drive Bridge, looking west.

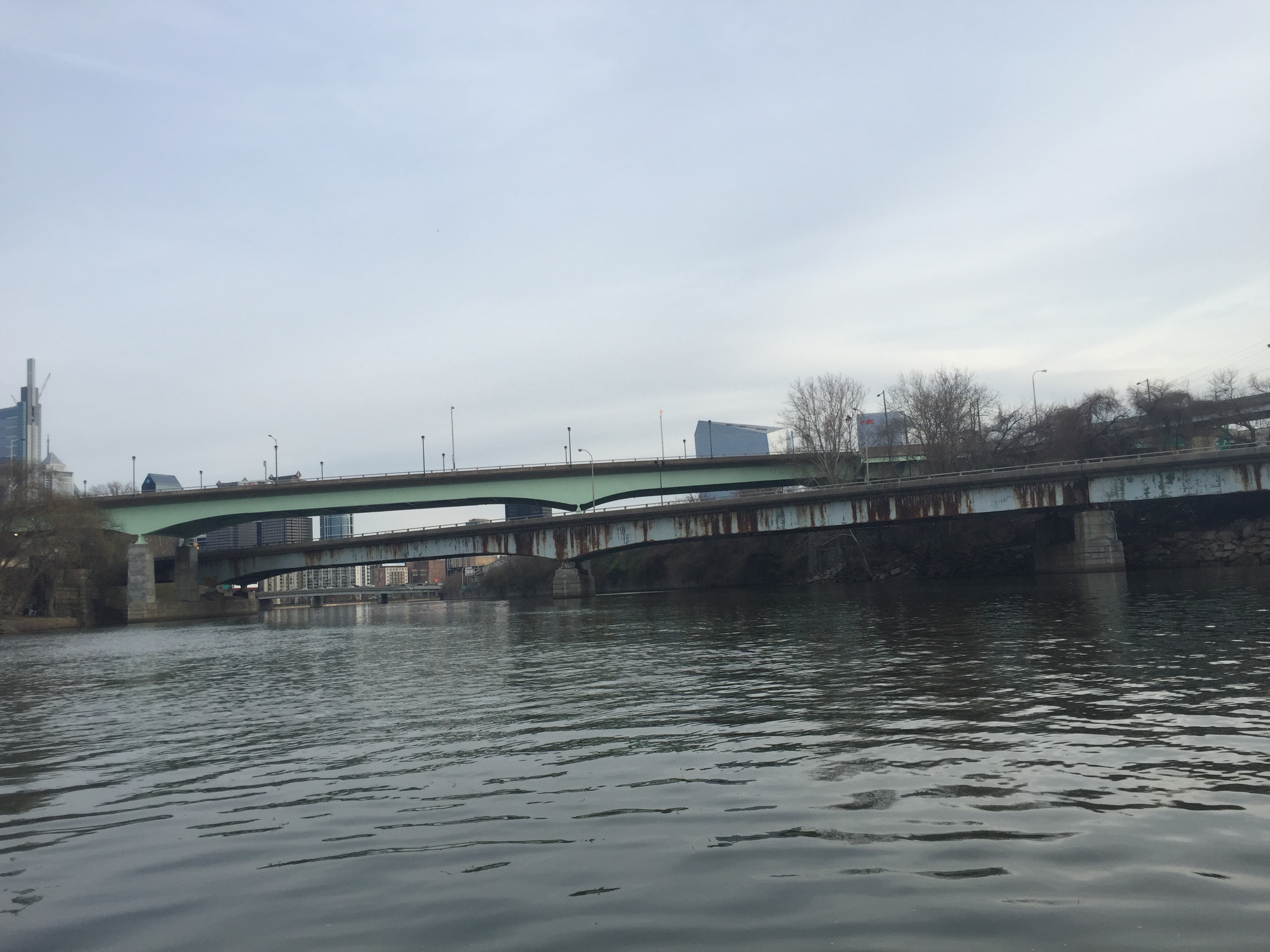
As viewed from a kayak on the Schuylkill River. The MLK Drive Bridge is the lower of the two.

== See also ==
- List of crossings of the Schuylkill River
