= Octorara Farm =

- U.S. National Register of Historic Places
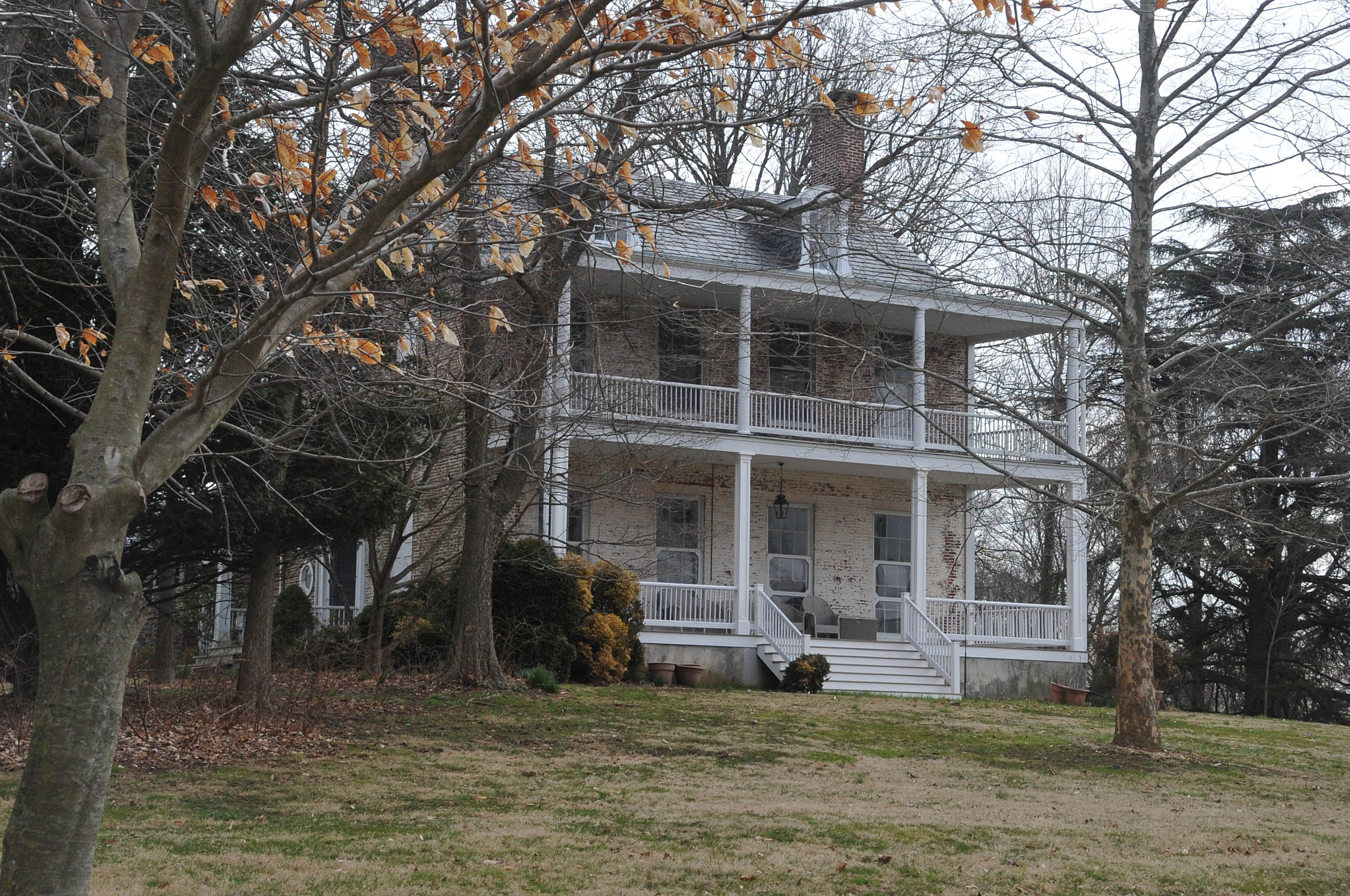

- Location within Maryland Location within the United States
- Location: South of Conowing on Rowlandsville Road, Conowingo, Maryland
- Coordinates: 39°40′19″N 76°9′4″W
- Area: 96 acres (39 ha)
- Built: 1825
- Architectural style: Greek Revival, Second Empire, Federal
- NRHP reference No.: 80001805
- Added to NRHP: May 7, 1980

Octorara Farm is a historic home located at Conowingo, Cecil County, Maryland, United States. It was built in sections dating from the period between 1775 and 1840. The main block is a 2 1/2-story brick structure of high style Greek Revival architecture; it was probably added to the earlier rear section around 1830–1840. The present kitchen, which constitutes the central room of the three rooms of the rear section, is the earliest section of the house, probably dates to about 1775. Also on the property are a large four-bay fieldstone barn, a wagon shed, dairy, smokehouse, and tenant houses.

Octorara Farm was listed on the National Register of Historic Places in 1980.
