= Port Deposit Bridge =

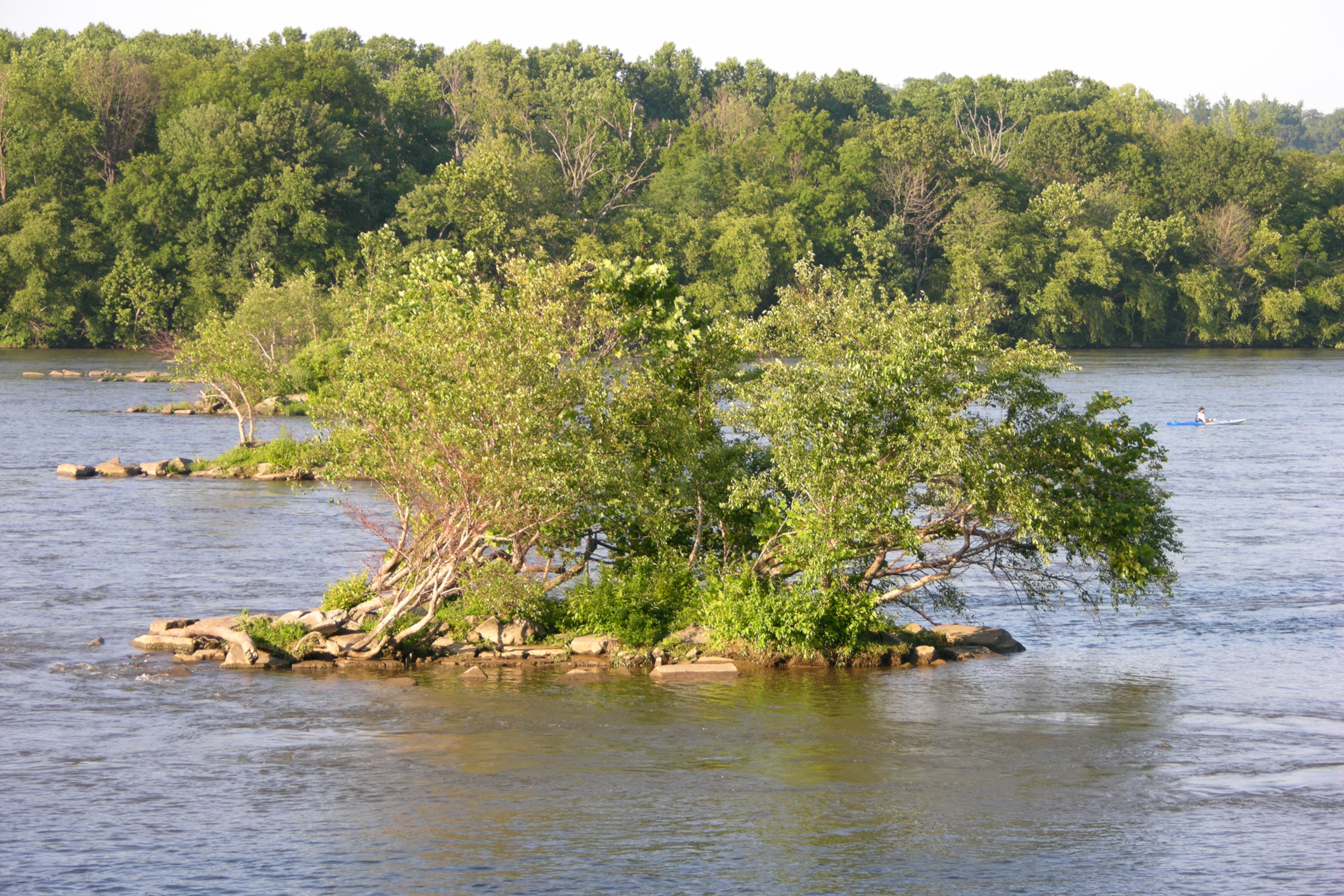
- Ruins of piers of Susquehanna River Bridge from the western shore
- Coordinates: 39°36′50″N 76°08′06″W
- Crossed: Susquehanna River
- Locale: Port Deposit, Maryland
- Other name: Susquehanna River Bridge

Characteristics
- Material: Wood
- Total length: 4,170 feet
- Longest span: 200 ft
- No. of spans: 18

History
- Constructed by: Susquehanna Bridge and Bank Company
- Fabrication by: Theodore Burr
- Opened: 1817
- Rebuilt: 1828
- Collapsed: 1857
- Replaced by: Conowingo Bridge

Location
- Interactive map of Port Deposit Bridge

The Port Deposit Bridge (also known as the Susquehanna River Bridge or Rock Run Toll Bridge) was the earliest bridge crossing of the Susquehanna River below Columbia, Pennsylvania, providing the first reliable link between the northern and southern United States. The bridge was also the fifth and last of Theodore Burr's Susquehanna crossings. The wooden covered bridge was constructed just north of Port Deposit, Maryland, between 1817 and 1818 and lasted until 1857. It was built and operated by the Susquehanna Bridge and Bank Company.

== History ==
The site for the bridge was surveyed in 1813. The bridge crossed from north of Port Deposit to just below Rock Run stream in Harford County. The bridge crossed Steel, Roberts, and Wood Islands. Construction of the bridge was started in 1817. The bridge was constructed by Theodore Burr, who had just completed work on four Susquehanna bridges in Pennsylvania. The bridge design used his Burr arch truss. "This ultimate achievement of Burr's on the Susquehanna, having in all eighteen 200-foot trussed arch wooden spans, eight between the west shore and a first island, two between that and a second island, and eight more between that and the east shore, and a total length of 4,170 feet, was to be performed in two years. For the years between 1812 and 1818, Burr's trussed arch had been an increasing triumph.". The bridge opened in 1818.

On 1 January 1823, friction from an iron-shod sleigh caused a fire that burned large portions of the bridge. It was rebuilt by Louis Wernwag in 1824. The bridge operated until 1854, when a herd of cattle caused two spans to collapse. It remained closed and a large section of the eastern span was destroyed by the spring flood of 1857. It was superseded by the Conowingo Bridge, which reopened in 1859, further upstream.

The ruins of the abutments are still clearly visible from the western shore or from above. The Jersey Toll House, located at the southwestern end of the bridge, still exists as part of Susquehanna State Park.

== See also ==
- List of crossings of the Susquehanna River
