= Colossus Bridge (Philadelphia) =

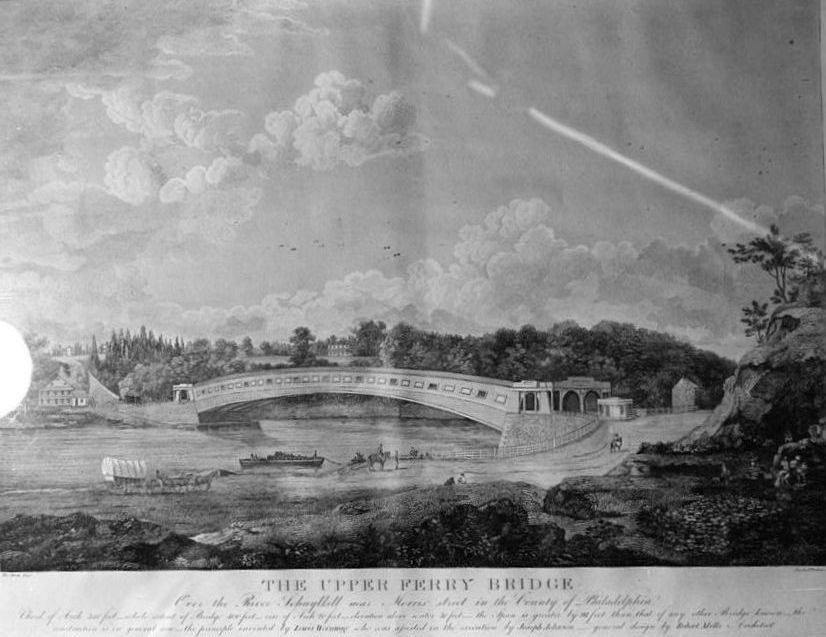
"The Upper Ferry Bridge" in an 1823 engraving.

The Colossus Bridge – also known as Fairmount Bridge, Colossus of Fairmount or Upper Ferry Bridge (and formally as the Lancaster Schuylkill Bridge) – was a record-setting timber bridge across the Schuylkill River near Philadelphia. It was built in 1812 by Louis Wernwag, and was considered his finest bridge design. It had a clear span of 340 feet (103.6 m) and the longest single-span wooden truss to be erected in the United States as well as the first long span bridge to use iron rods.

Caption of the 1823 engraving shown at right:

THE UPPER FERRY BRIDGE.
Over the River Schuylkill near Morris street in the County of Philadelphia, chord of arch 340 feet, whole extent of Bridge 400 feet, rise of Arch 20 feet, elevation above water 30 feet, the span is greater by 98 feet than that of any other Bridge known, the Construction is in general new, the principle invented by Lewis Wernwag, who was afsisted in the execution by Jos.h Johnson, general design by Rob.t Mills, Architect.

The bridge was destroyed September 1, 1838, by fire. The bridge was succeeded by Charles Ellet Jr.'s 1842 wire suspension bridge, followed by the 1875 Callowhill Street truss bridge. The modern bridge at this site is the 1965 Spring Garden Street Bridge.

The bridge was located near 39°57′50″N 75°11′00″W.

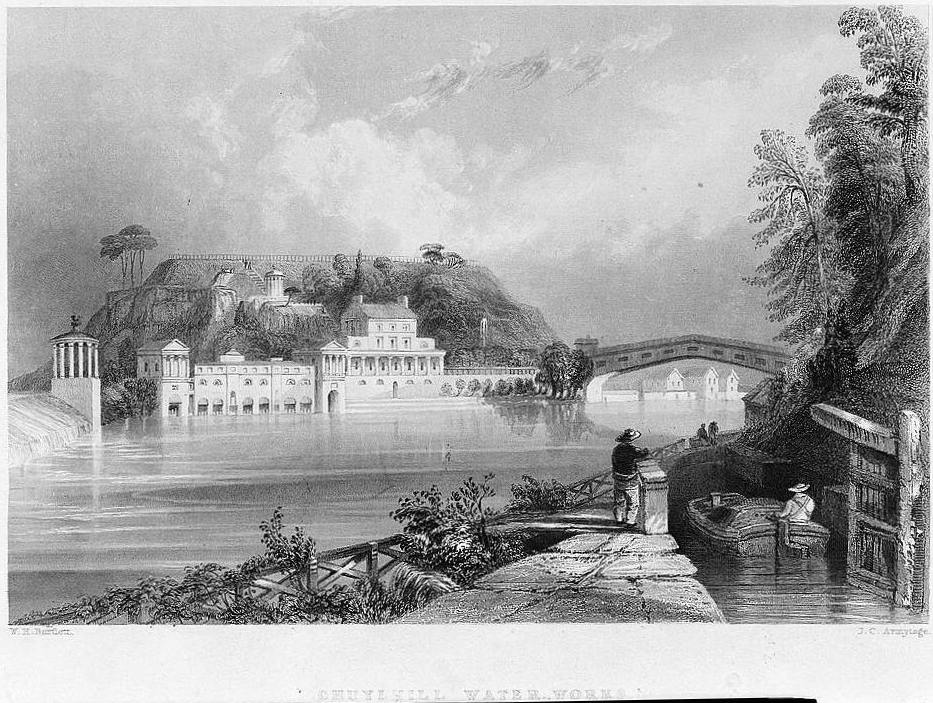
"Schuylkill Waterworks" (1835), with "The Colossus" in the background.

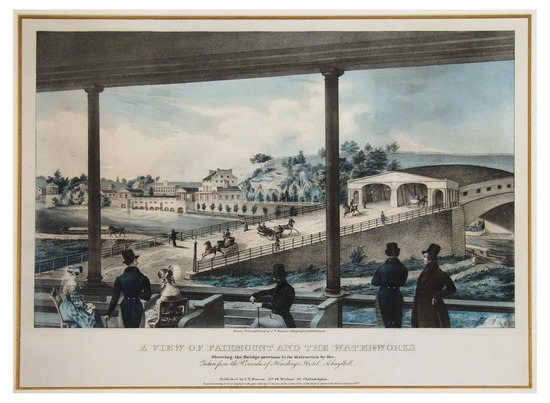
"A View of Fairmount and the Waterworks" (1835) by John Rubens Smith.

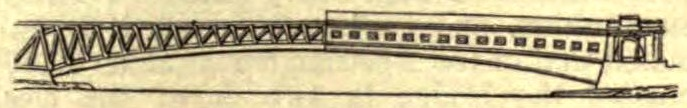
Diagram with section showing internals.
