= Theodore Burr =

American inventor and civil engineer (1771–1822)

- Born: August 16, 1771
- Died: November 22, 1822 (aged 51)

Theodore Burr (August 16, 1771 – November 22, 1822) was an inventor from Torrington, Connecticut, who was credited with the Burr Arch Truss bridge design. He designed and built one of the first bridges across the Hudson River and several bridges that crossed the Susquehanna River.

== Patent ==
Burr was awarded US Patent No. 2769 on April 4, 1817, for his arch and truss bridge design. The "Burr arch truss" used two long arches, resting on the abutments on either end, that typically sandwiched a multiple kingpost structure. Theodore Burr built nearly every bridge that crossed the Susquehanna River from Binghamton, New York, to Maryland in the early 19th century. His successes made him the most distinguished architect of bridges in the country.

== Professional life ==
Theodore Burr came to Oxford, New York in 1792. By 1794, he had built a grist mill (once owned by Fletcher & Corbin), and a dam to power the mill. In 1800, he built the first stringer bridge across the Chenango River in Oxford.

Around 1804, Burr built the first "sizable bridge" crossing New York's Hudson River, at Waterford, New York. It stood for over a century until it was destroyed by fire in 1909.

A few miles from the Waterford bridge, in 1808 the 997-foot Burr Bridge in Schenectady, NY was opened, held up by 7 piers. It was a suspension bridge rather than an arched bridge, the suspension cables being made of wood. It originally consisted of four very long spans across three piers, but it soon started to sag and four additional piers were added to support it.

From 1809 to 1811, he built an impressive Federal style house for his family at 8 Fort Hill Park in Oxford. Wings were added to both sides of the house at a later and unknown date. The building still stands and houses the Oxford Memorial Library.

Between 1811 and 1818, Burr designed, then constructed or supervised five crossings of the Susquehanna River. The first four were in Pennsylvania at Nescopeck Falls (Berwick), Columbia, Harrisburg, and Northumberland. The last was the 4,170-foot (1,270 m) Susquehanna River Bridge near Port Deposit, Maryland.

== Personal life ==
In 1789, Burr married Asenath Cook in Hartford, Connecticut. On April 13, 1794, they had a daughter named Philomela Burr.
