= Conowingo Bridge =

Bridge in Maryland, US

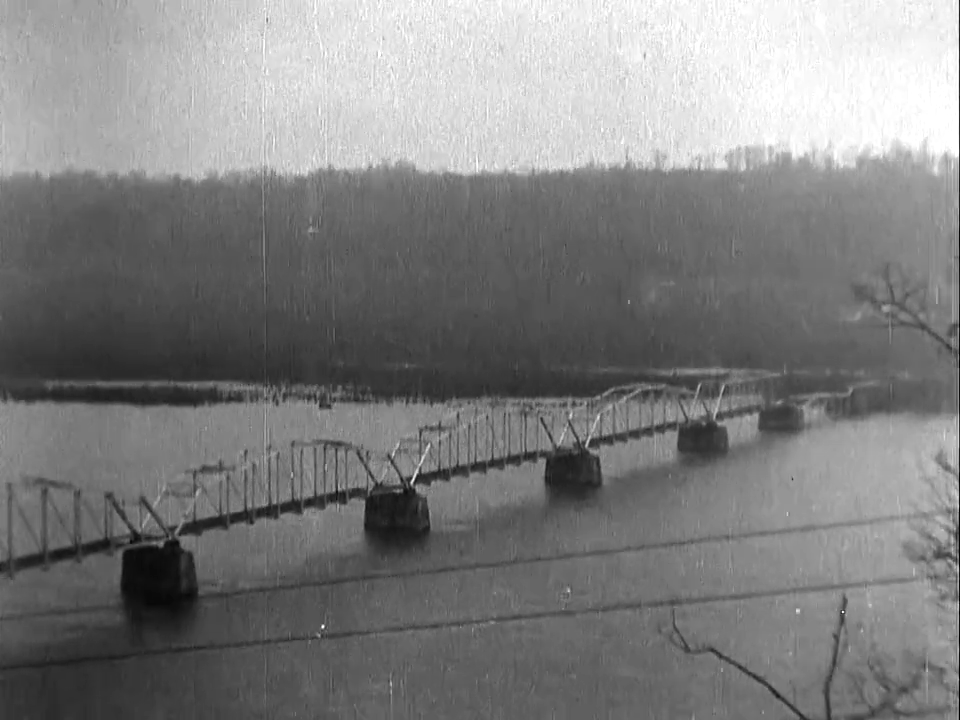
- Film still of the bridge in 1928, from archival footage of its demolition.
- Coordinates: 39°40′51″N 76°12′09″W
- Carries: Two lanes of US 1
- Crosses: Susquehanna River
- Locale: Conowingo, Maryland

Characteristics
- Total length: 1,334-foot (407 m)

History
- Construction start: 1818
- Construction end: 1820
- Opened: 1820
- Closed: 1928

Several incarnations of the Conowingo Bridge crossed the Susquehanna River at the original location of Conowingo, Maryland, United States, about two miles upstream of the Conowingo Dam, which replaced it.

== History ==
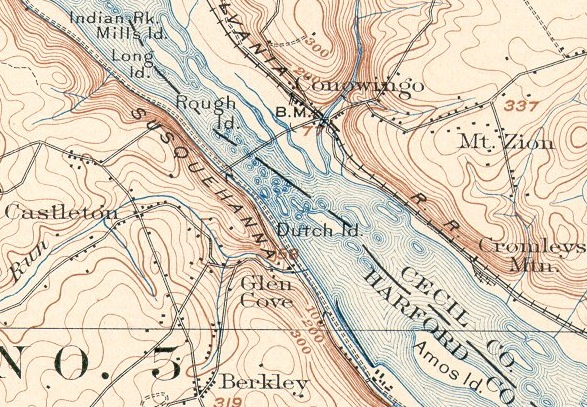
Location of the Conowingo Bridge, 1900

The original Conowingo Bridge was a seven-span, 1,334-foot (407 m), covered bridge built between 1818 and 1820 by Louis Wernwag, who also worked on the Port Deposit Bridge. (Another source lists 1844.) That bridge was destroyed, in 1846 or 1847, by a flood. A new wooden covered bridge opened in 1859.

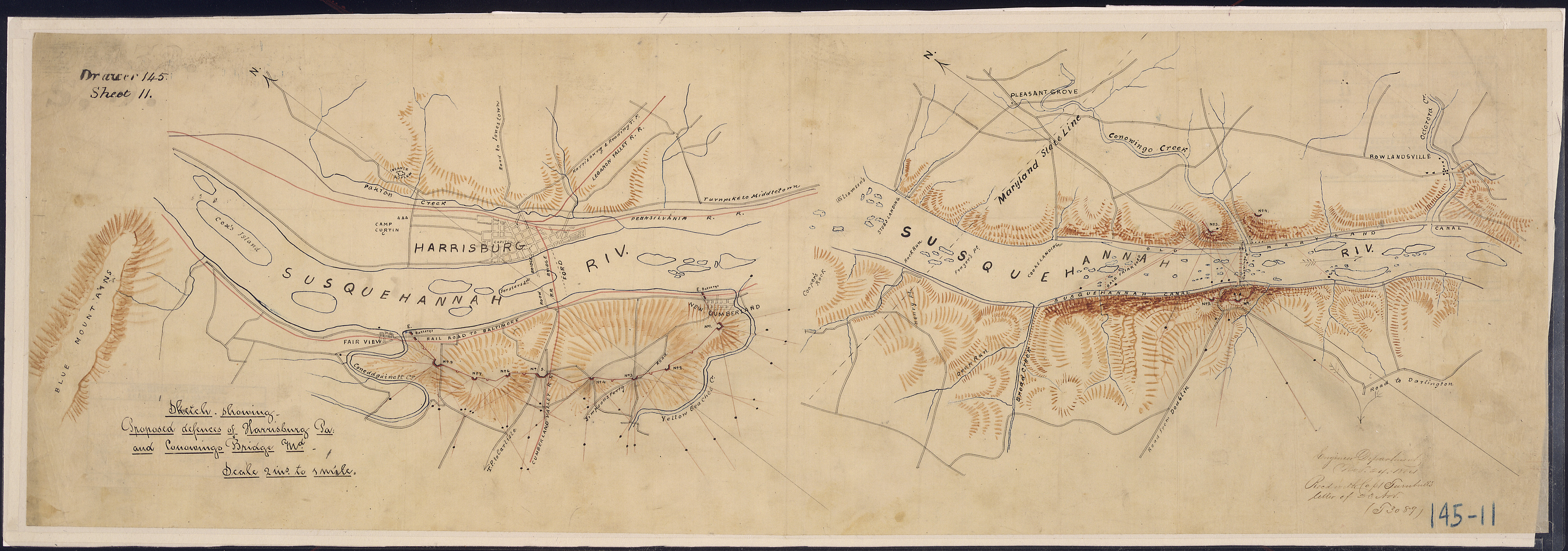
Civil War defense plan for the bridge

This crossing was an important link between Maryland and northern states in the 19th century. During the American Civil War, it was guarded on its southern approach, and some of the bridge decking was removed to prevent surreptitious crossing.

On June 6, 1907, "firebugs" set fire to the 1859 bridge using kerosene. About three-quarters of a mile of it burned. The bridge was rebuilt as a steel structure in 1909. In 1911, the state of Maryland bought the bridge and ended the tolls.

With the dam's completion in 1928, both the town and the crossing were relocated due to the rising waters impounded by the dam. The road crossing moved to the top of the dam. The bridge was then destroyed by blasting gelatin.
