= Conowingo, Maryland =

Unincorporated community in Maryland, United States

- Unincorporated community
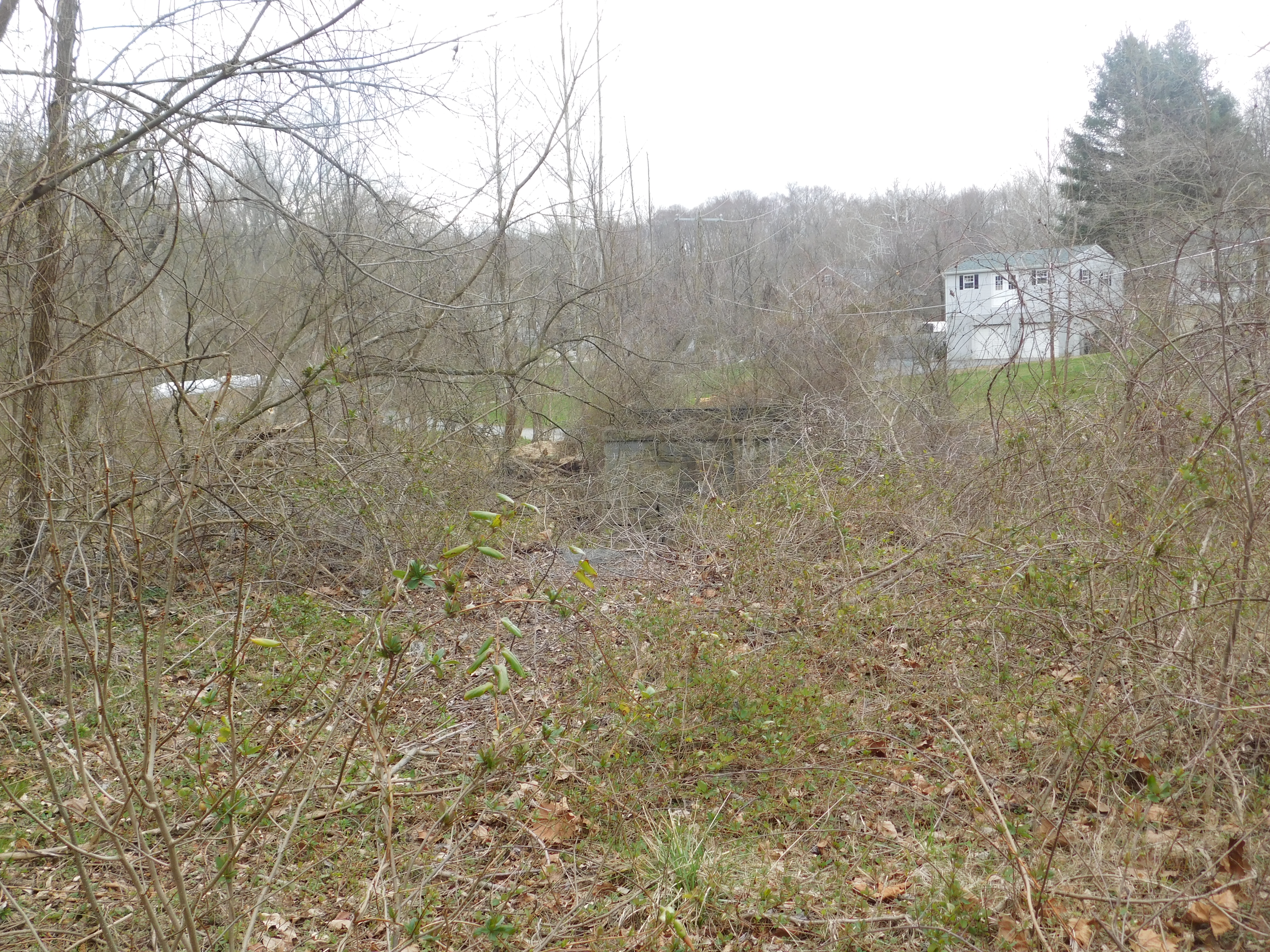

- Location within the State of Maryland Conowingo (the United States)
- Coordinates: 39°40′40″N 76°09′33″W
- Country: United States
- State: Maryland
- County: Cecil
- Elevation: 289 ft (88 m)
- Time zone: UTC-5 (Eastern (EST))
  - Summer (DST): UTC-4 (EDT)
- ZIP code: 21918
- Area codes: 410, 443, and 667
- GNIS feature ID: 590012

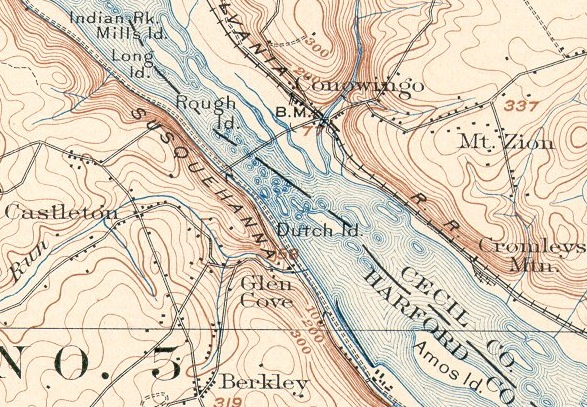
Original location of Conowingo

Conowingo is a community in northwestern Cecil County, Maryland, United States. The community replaced a previous one that was inundated by a reservoir.

== Etymology ==
Conowingo is a Susquehannock word for "at the rapids".

== History ==
Conowingo was originally located on the eastern bank of the Susquehanna River at the confluence of the Conowingo Creek with the river. Conowingo was at the rapids that were the first navigation obstacle on the Susquehanna upstream of the Chesapeake Bay, the location of an early stretch of canal. It was also the site of the Conowingo Bridge.

In the decade before a utility harnessed the power of the river, the thriving place had a population of 350 people, according to the Maryland State Gazetteer for 1902-02. Two doctors, Samuel T. Roman and D. M. Ragan, cared for the sick. Lodging was available from John T. Adams and E. P. Bostick, while Thos. Coonie baked bread and cakes for townspeople. Merchants included Chas A. Andrew, Geo. Brewinger, Wm. Gross, E. B. McDowell, and W. W. McGuigan. There were tradesmen such as John C. Smith, blacksmiths; Jas. Ritchey, shoemaker; and Robt. McCullough, Harnessmaker; W. R. Love was the postmaster. Mills included Allen & Wilson, flint mill; Jas. C. Bell, saw and flour mill; and the Susquehanna Paper Co. A daily stage provided transportation to Rowlandsville, Berkley, Darlington, Delta and other places.

A 90-foot (27.4 m) fall of the river at the rapids dictated the location of the Conowingo Dam and thus the resulting inundation of the Old Conowingo site by the subsequent Conowingo Reservoir. At the completion of the dam in 1928, farmers and villagers uprooted by the construction of the large hydroelectric facility gathered on the hillside to watch as the village met its water doom and old Conowingo slowly vanished beneath the water. The date was Jan. 18, 1928. The Conowingo Post Office was relocated to the hill above the dam.

Conowingo is not an incorporated municipality, nor a US Census Bureau census-designated place.

Octorara Farm was listed on the National Register of Historic Places in 1980.

Other significant places include: Rumbleway Farm, Hilltop Farm Inc.,, and multiple Christmas Tree farms.

=== Conowingo Village ===
A new town, named Conowingo Village, was created in 1928, on the Harford County side of the dam. It was initially a company town to house the dam's plant managers and workers. From the 1980s to 2000, the power company leased the homes to non-workers. In October 2000, the village was shuttered. And in 2001 the power company donated the land to the Maryland Department of Natural Resources and the buildings to the local fire companies for training.

==== Geography ====
- Original location: 39°40′56″N 76°11′51″W
- Present location (of Post Office): 39°40′36″N 76°9′44″W
