= Elk Neck Peninsula =

American landscape in Cecil County, Maryland

Coordinates: 39°29′57.38″N 75°58′1.29″W

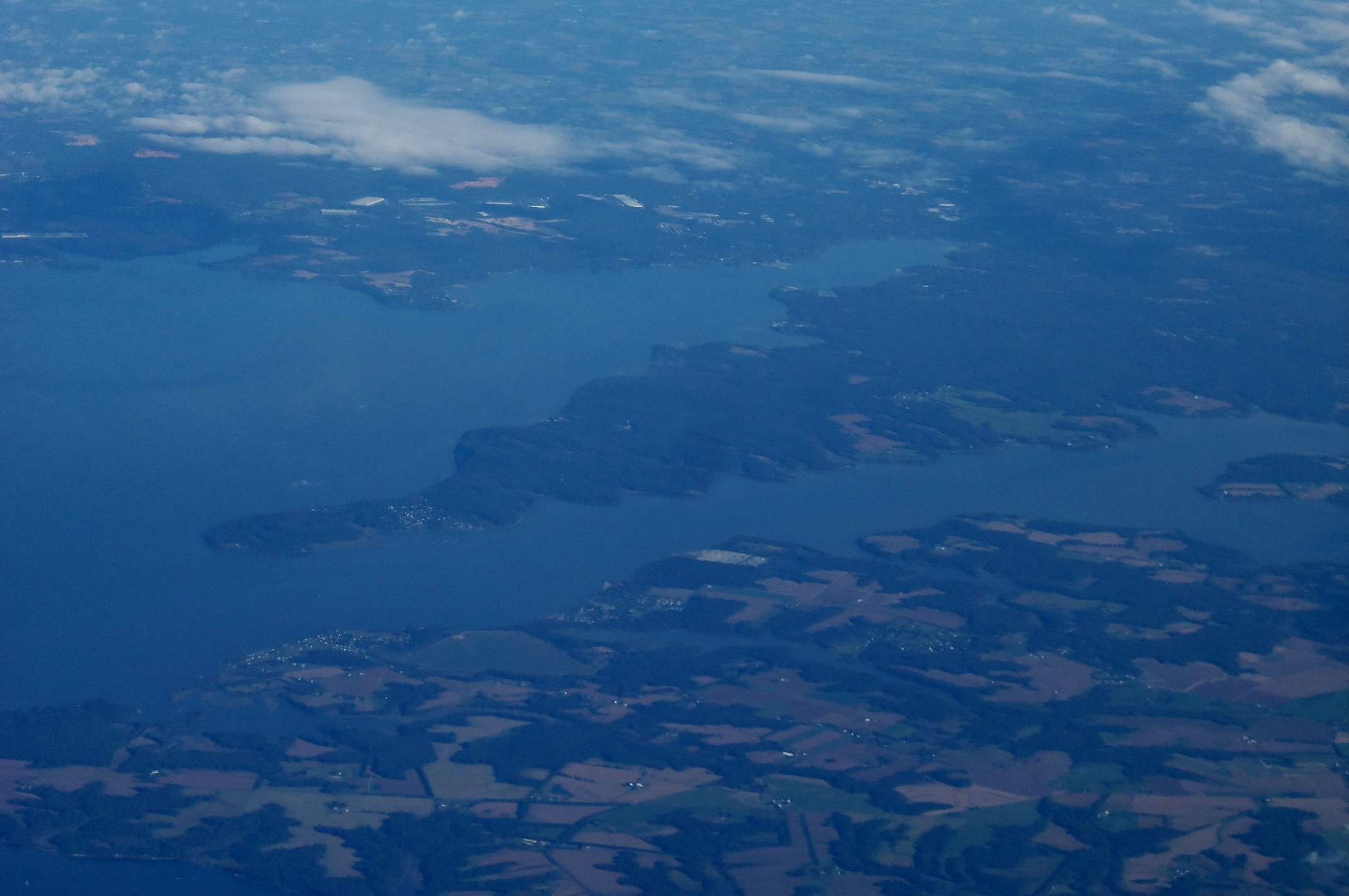
Elk Neck Peninsula (center) in 2020

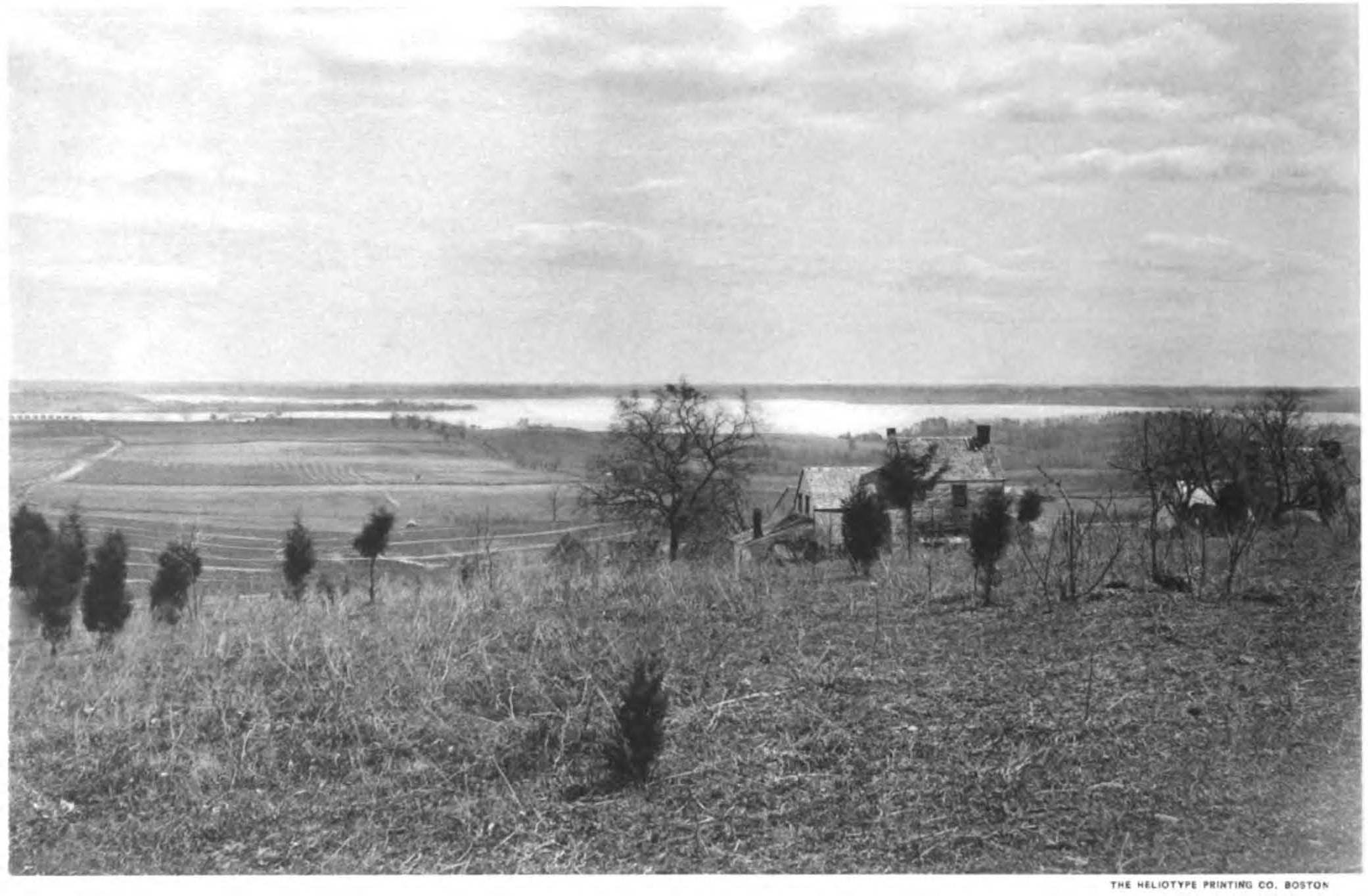
Facing south toward the confluence of Elk and Bohemia Rivers, from Elk Neck Peninsula, c. 1898

Elk Neck Peninsula is in Cecil County, Maryland, between the towns of Elkton and North East, Maryland. Native American and colonial travelers often canoed or sailed up the Chesapeake Bay to Elkton, where the Elk River became unnavigable, and then walked or took some form of surface transportation to the Delaware Bay watershed, since this was the shortest surface crossing. Native Americans of the area, including the Nanticoke and Lenni Lenape, hunted and fished, as well as established semi-permanent camps.

Elk Neck State Park includes the southern tip of the peninsula, bounded by the North East River, Elk River, as well as the Chesapeake Bay. Maryland Route 272 ends at the point of the peninsula, with the famous Turkey Point Light. Much of the peninsula's land is legally protected from development, either as part of the state park or as part of Elk Neck State Forest. Deep forests, bluffs, beaches and marshlands are the primary natural features of the park's landscape.

In 1877 during the American Revolutionary War, General Howe landed on the peninsula at Turkey point after capturing New York on his way to launch the Philadelphia campaign.

As of the most recent 2025 census, Elk Neck Peninsula is home to 11,873 people spread across a total land area of 40.46 square miles (104.79 km²), yielding a population density of approximately 293 people per square mile (113 p/km²). The region experiences a humid subtropical climate (Köppen Cfa), with terrain elevations ranging from just a few meters above sea level up to 89 m at its highest points; a broad interior plateau sits at roughly 35 m elevation.
