= Augustine Herman =

Czech traveller and cartographer

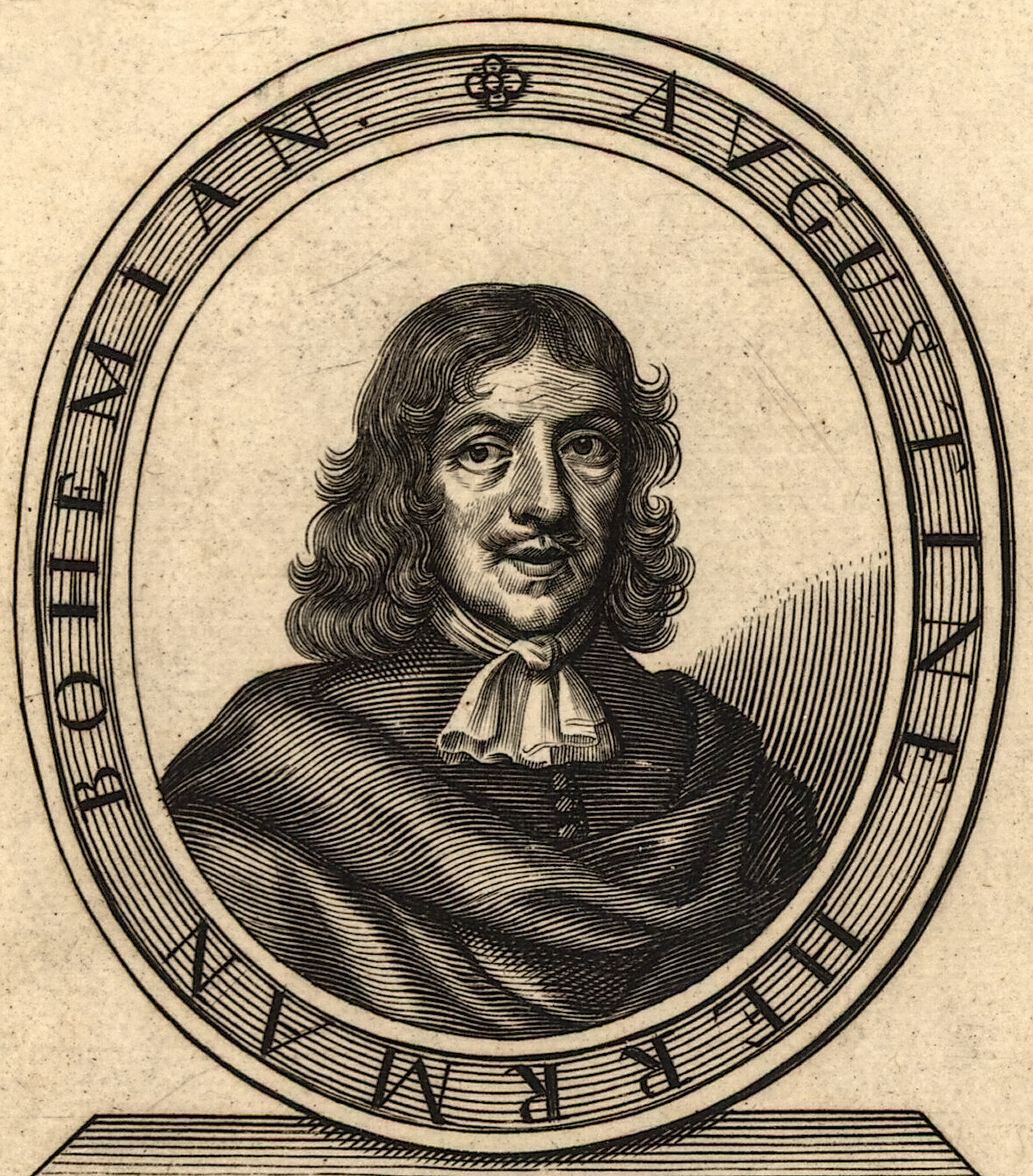

First Lord of Bohemia Manor
- In office September 1660 – September 1686
- Succeeded by: Ephraim George Herman

Personal details
- Born: c. 1621 Mšeno, Kingdom of Bohemia
- Died: September 1686 Cecil County, Province of Maryland, British America
- Spouse: Jannetje Varleth
- Occupation: Merchant
- Profession: Land surveyor, draughtsman
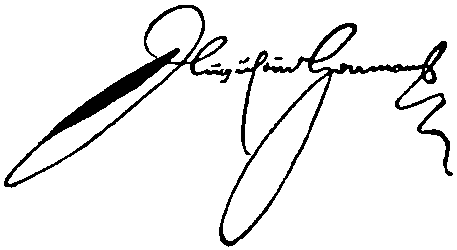
- Signature

Augustine Herman, First Lord of Bohemia Manor (Czech: Augustin Heřman, c. 1621 – September 1686) was a Bohemian explorer, merchant and cartographer who lived in New Amsterdam and Cecil County, Maryland. In the employment of Cecil Calvert, 2nd Baron Baltimore, he produced a remarkably accurate map of the Chesapeake Bay and Delaware Bay regions of North America, in exchange for which he was permitted to establish an enormous plantation that he named Bohemia Manor in what is now southeastern Cecil County, Maryland.

Land rights to the area now known as St. Augustine, Maryland were granted to Herman by Lord Baltimore prior to 1686 but the Herman family was never able to lay proper claim to the title. Chroniclers have spelled the surname variously: Herman, Herrman, Harman, Harmans, Heerman, Hermans, Heermans, etc. Augustine Herman himself usually wrote Herman, which is now the accepted style. He frequently added "Bohemiensis" ("the Bohemian", "the Czech"), as a suffix.

== Early life ==
According to the most reliable evidence, Augustine Herman was born about 1621 in Mšeno, Kingdom of Bohemia; the location he himself stated in his last testament. The claim that he was born in 1605, as the son of Augustine Ephraim Herman, and Beatrice, the daughter of Caspar Redel, has never been established, nor has the belief of some that he may have been the son of Abraham Herman, the evangelical pastor of Mšeno. Accordingly, the claims that his father was a wealthy merchant and councilman of Prague, who was killed in 1620 at the Battle of White Mountain during the Thirty Years' War, remains hearsay.

Herman was trained as a surveyor, and was skilled in sketching and drawing. He was also conversant in a number of languages, including Latin, which he successfully applied in his diplomatic assignments with the British.

=== Undocumented stories ===
There has been much speculation about Herman's early years. It has been asserted that he made a trip to North America in 1633, when he allegedly signed his name witnessing the Dutch purchase of lands from the Lenape Native Americans near the later site of Philadelphia. Some also claim that he made voyages to the Dutch Antilles and Surinam and that he claimed to be "the first founder of the Virginia tobacco-trade," which began in 1612. All these claims are undocumented and highly questionable. The witnessing cited above may have been a mistranslation of the original Dutch document, and all these events would have required him to have been born about 1605, married at 45, and lived to over 80.

== Career ==
=== New Netherland ===
In 1640, working for the West India Company Herman arrived in New Amsterdam, now Lower Manhattan in New York City. Due to his strong personality he soon became an important member of the Dutch community and its commerce. He was an agent for the mercantile house of Peter Gabry and Sons of Amsterdam, and was one of the owners of the frigate "La Grace," which was engaged in privateering against Spanish commerce. In partnership with his sister-in-law and brother-in-law, Anna Varlett Hack and George Hack, he became the largest exporter of tobacco in America. Trading furs and tobacco for wine and slaves, he quickly became wealthy and the owner of considerable real estate, including most of what is now Yonkers, New York.

At that point he was one of the most influential people in New Amsterdam, he was elected in 1647 to board of the Nine Men a body of prominent citizens organized to advise and guide the Director-General of New Netherland. In time he would chair this Board. Unhappy with the leadership of Peter Stuyvesant Herman was one of the signatories of a complaint, the "Vertoogh," which was sent to Holland in July 1649, "to represent the poor condition of this country and pray for redress." Stuyvesant could not let this challenge pass, and proceeded to take measures to assure Herman's financial ruin. In 1653, Herman was briefly imprisoned for indebtedness.

In 1651, on behalf of the province, Herman negotiated the purchase of Staten Island and a large tract along the western shore of Arthur Kill from what is now Perth Amboy to Elizabeth.

Herman married December 10, 1651, while he was in New Amsterdam. His wife was Jannetje Marie Varleth, the daughter of Caspar Varleth and Judith Tentenier, of New Amsterdam. They had five children, Ephraim, Casper, Anna, Judith and Francina. Jannetje died before 1665, and sometime after that Herman married again, this time to Mary Catherine Ward from Maryland.

=== Delaware Bay ===
Stuyvesant would send Herman on a diplomatic mission to New England to resolve concerns about rumors of a Dutch and Native American alliance against the English. Of greater lasting importance, in 1659 he was sent to St. Mary's, Maryland with Resolved Waldron to negotiate the dispute between New Netherlands and Maryland's proprietor Cecil Calvert, 2nd Baron Baltimore over ownership of the lands on the western shore of the Delaware Bay, that were claimed by both parties.

Herman first articulated the argument that Lord Baltimore's charter was only good for lands that had not been previously settled, and that the short-lived, 1631 Swanendael settlement(usually spelled Zwaanendael), at present day Lewes, Delaware, gave the Dutch prior rights to the whole Delaware River watershed. Baltimore rejected the argument completely, but subsequently the English successors to the Dutch title, the Duke of York and William Penn, were successful in making the case, ultimately leading to the separate existence of the state of Delaware. Regardless of the success of the negotiations, Herman had made a good impression on the Calverts.

=== Bohemia Manor ===
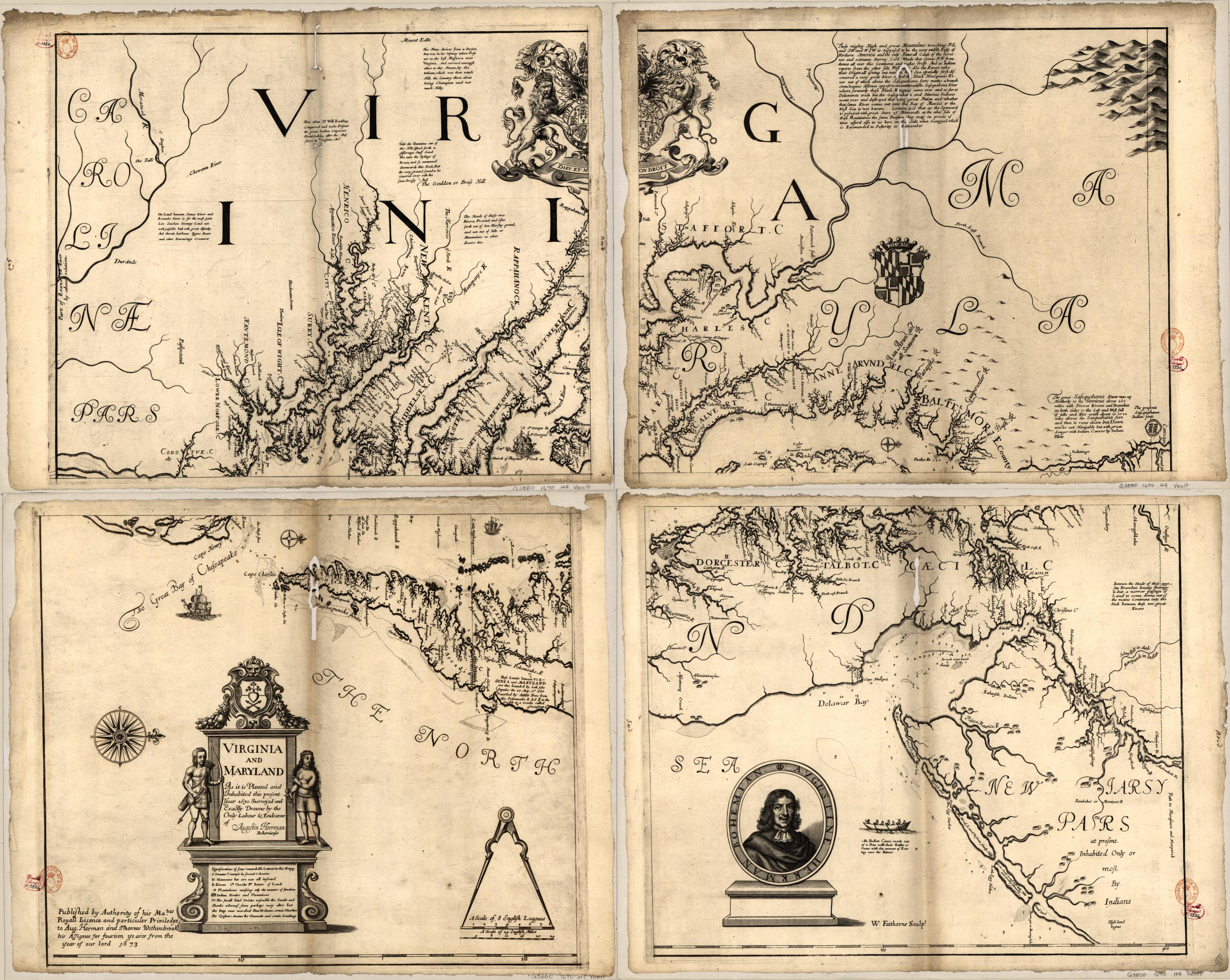
Herman's 1670 map of Maryland and Virginia

Herman, weary of conflict with Stuyvesant and remembering the fine lands he crossed in the upper Chesapeake Bay, offered to produce Lord Baltimore a map of the region in return for a grant of land in the area of his choosing. The offer was accepted and the grant made in September 1660 so Herman began his 10 years of work on the map. It stated that as compensation for his services Lord Baltimore would grant him "Lands for Inhabitation to his Posterity and the Privilege of the Manor." Wasting no time, Herman moved his family to Maryland by 1661.

Herman selected his first grant of 4000 acres of land and named it "Bohemia Manor" after his birthplace. It included much of the land east of the Elk River and north of the Bohemia River. The manor house was built on the north shore of the Bohemia River, across from Hacks Point, and just to the west of present-day Maryland Route 213. The property included an enclosed park where Herman kept deer as pets.

Because he was of non-British origin, Herman was obliged to apply for citizenship of Maryland by an act of their Assembly. His petition, in 1666, was successful and he became a naturalized citizen of Maryland.

Once he completed the map of Maryland and Virginia in 1670, additional grants were made. They became known as "Little Bohemia," south of the Bohemia River, and "St. Augustine Manor," stretching to the Delaware River between St. George's Creek and Appoquinimink River. In all he owned nearly 30,000 acres (120 km^{2}) and became one of the largest landowners in North America. For added insurance he then successfully negotiated an agreement to pay a compensatory sum for the territory to the Susquehannock Native Americans, who owned the land.

Jasper Danckaerts and Peter Sluyter, emissaries of Friesland pietists, known as Labadists, met Ephraim George Herman, the son of Herman, in New York and he introduced them to his father in 1679. Initially Herman did not want to grant land to them, only permit their settlement, but in 1683, he conveyed a tract of 3,750 acres (15 km^{2}) to them because of legal issues. The group established a colony but it was not very successful not growing larger than 100 people. The settlement ceased to exist after 1720.

For the remainder of his life, Herman managed his plantation and enjoyed the life of a country squire, occasionally engaging in mercantile activities and official duties. He was a member of the governor's council and a justice of Baltimore County which then included all of the upper Chesapeake Bay. In 1674, Cecil County was created, and the first courthouse was built near the Sassafras River. In 1678, Herman was appointed as Cecil County's Commissioner for Peace to treat with the Native Americans.

== Death ==
During his last years Herman was disabled by paralysis, and according to one source, by an "inattentive wife." He was 65 years old when he died in September 1686 at Bohemia Manor in Cecil County, Maryland and he is buried there.

== Legacy ==
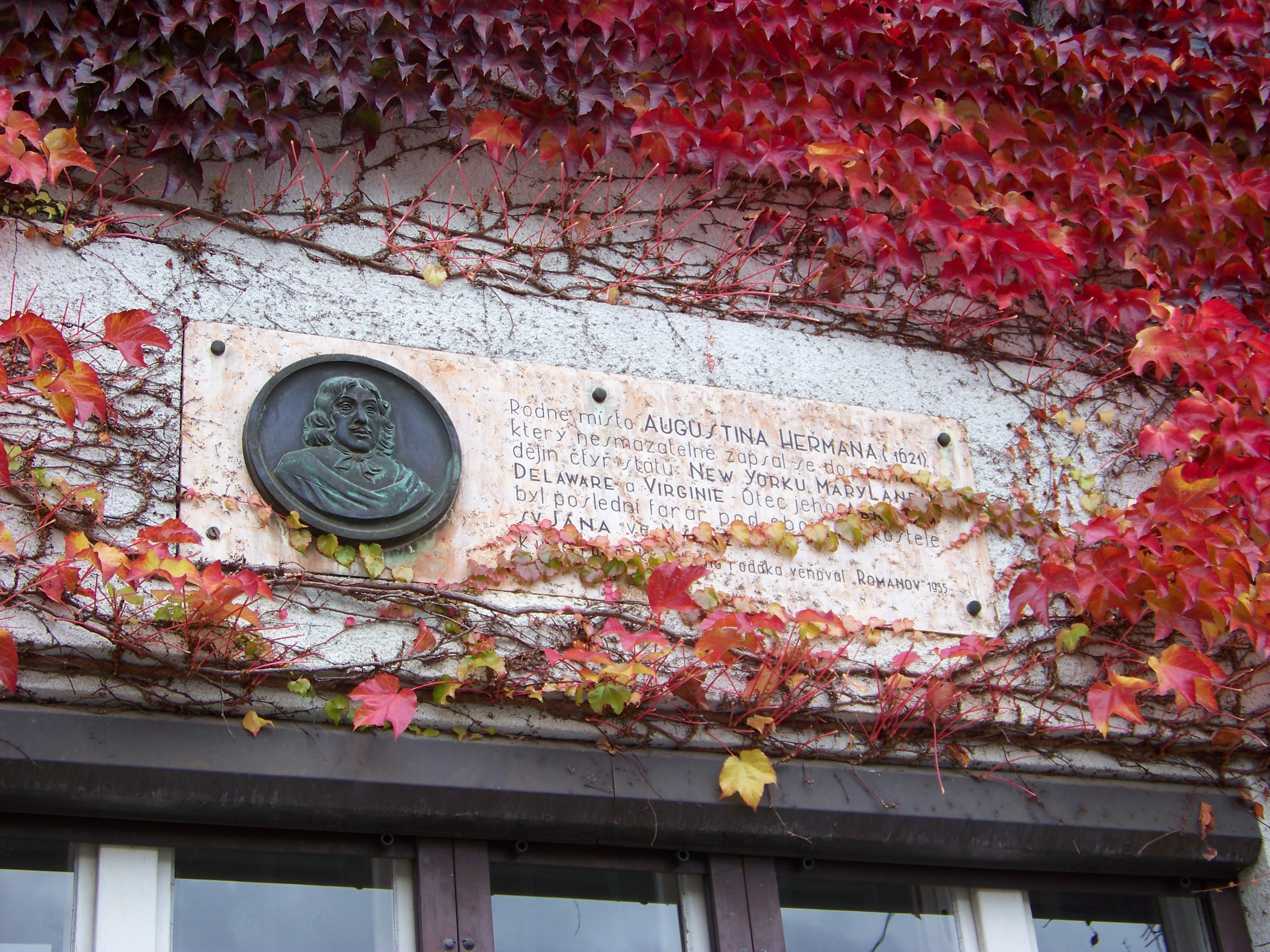
Plaque in Mšeno, Czech Republic

A plaque is displayed in the town of Mšeno, Czech Republic on Cinibulkova street. On the plaque Herman is referenced using the Czech spelling of this name, Augustin Heřman.

During the later 1800s and early 1900s, the Czech community of Baltimore made an annual pilgrimage to Cecil County to visit Herman's grave. In 1907, 400 Czechs from Baltimore boarded the steamship Annapolis to attend the pilgrimage at Bohemia Manor, where they were joined by 700 locals, many of whom were descended from Herman.

=== Children and grandchildren ===
- Ephraim George Herman, the eldest son, became Second Lord of Bohemia Manor. He was born in New Amsterdam in 1652. Ephraim lived in New York City in 1673, and was in New Castle County by 1676 where he was at various times Clerk of the Courts of New Castle County and Upland County and Surveyor for St. Jones County and New Castle County. About 1680 he became a Labadist, but was taken sick, lost his mind, and died on Bohemia Manor in 1689, surviving his father by only three years. He had married Elizabeth van Rodenburg, who survived him, subsequently marrying Major John Donaldson, a member of the provincial council of Pennsylvania. They had four children, but it is believed that all of Ephraim's children died before reaching maturity, and the Lordship passed to his brother when he died.
- Casparus Augustine Herman, the second son, became the third Lord of Bohemia Manor. He was born in New Amsterdam in 1656 and died on Bohemia Manor in 1704. Casperus lived in New Castle for a number of years and represented New Castle County in the general assembly of Pennsylvania and the Lower Counties from 1683 to 1685. He was later a member of the legislature of Maryland in 1694.
- Anna Margaritta Herman, the first daughter, was born in New Amsterdam before her baptism date of 10 March 1658. She married Thijs Jacobsz. She had issue.
- Judith Herman, the second daughter, was born 9 May 1660 in New Amsterdam. She married first to John Thompson and secondly to John Dowdall. She had issue with her first husband.
- Francina Herman, the third daughter, was born before her baptism date of 12 March 1662 in New Amsterdam. She married Joseph Wood Sr.
- Ephraim Augustine Herman, grandson of Augustine, was the fourth Lord of Bohemia Manor. He was born either on St. Augustine's Manor, or in nearby New Castle County, and died on Bohemia Manor in 1735. He was a member of the legislature of Maryland from Cecil County in 1715, 1716, 1728, and 1731.
- Casparus Herman, the son of Ephraim Augustine, became the fifth and final Lord of Bohemia Manor in 1735. He died four years later without any children and so the title became extinct. His elder sister, Mary Augustine Herman, was his primary heir, and she married John Lawson, who secured the inheritance. Eventually most of this passed to Richard Bassett through his step father, Peter Lawson, and his mother, Judith Thompson, a granddaughter of Augustine Herman, the first Lord, through his daughter, Judith Herman.

=== Other descendants ===
- Even beyond his numerous accomplishments during his lifetime, part of Augustine Herman's legacy have been the numerous distinguished descendants he left. Some of them are listed below.

Richard Bassett, Daniel Brewster, James A. Bayard, James A. Bayard Jr., Richard H. Bayard, Thomas F. Bayard, Thomas F. Bayard, Jr., Francis Beverley Biddle, James Bouldin, Thomas Bouldin, John B. Breckinridge, Lloyd Bryce, Ezekiel F. Chambers, Thomas Clayton, Henry W. Collier, Albert Constable, Robert Daniel, Lucius Q. C. Lamar, William B. Lamar, Harmon Cox, George E. Mitchell, Edmund Randolph, David Ross, and Joseph Tydings.

=== Place names ===
- Maryland Route 213 between Chestertown and Elkton is named the Augustine Herman Highway in his honor.
- There are two schools that are named in honor of Bohemia Manor; Bohemia Manor High School, and Bohemia Manor Middle School
- Augustine Beach Hotel derives its name from Augustine Herman.

== See also ==
- Buzzard Point
