= Elk Neck State Park =

Public recreation area in Maryland, US

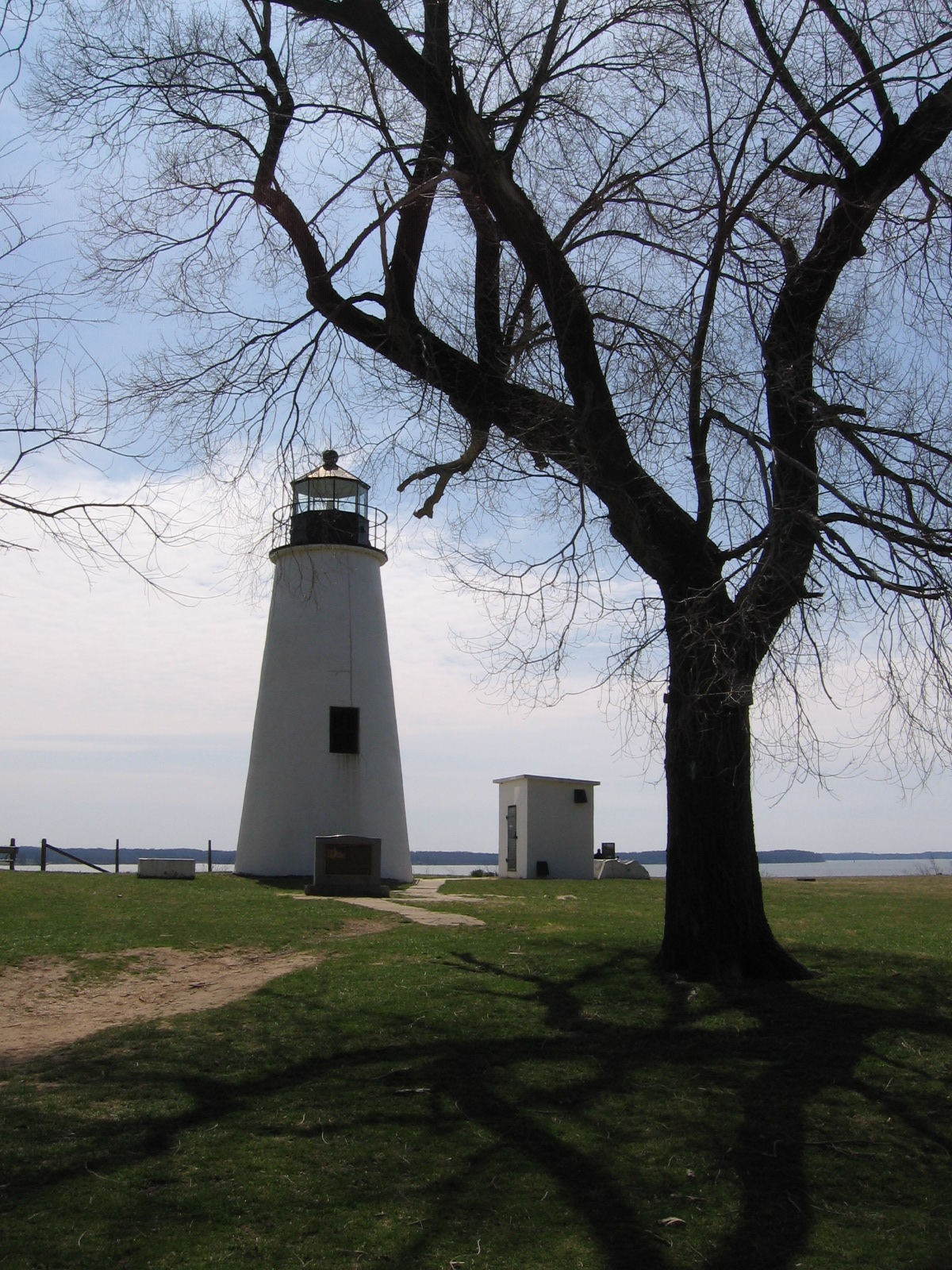
- Turkey Point Light

- Location within Maryland
- Location: Cecil County, Maryland, United States
- Nearest town: North East, Maryland
- Coordinates: 39°29′14″N 75°59′24″W
- Area: 2,369 acres (959 ha)
- Elevation: 262 ft (80 m)
- Established: 1936
- Administrator: Maryland Department of Natural Resources
- Designation: Maryland state park
- Website: Official website

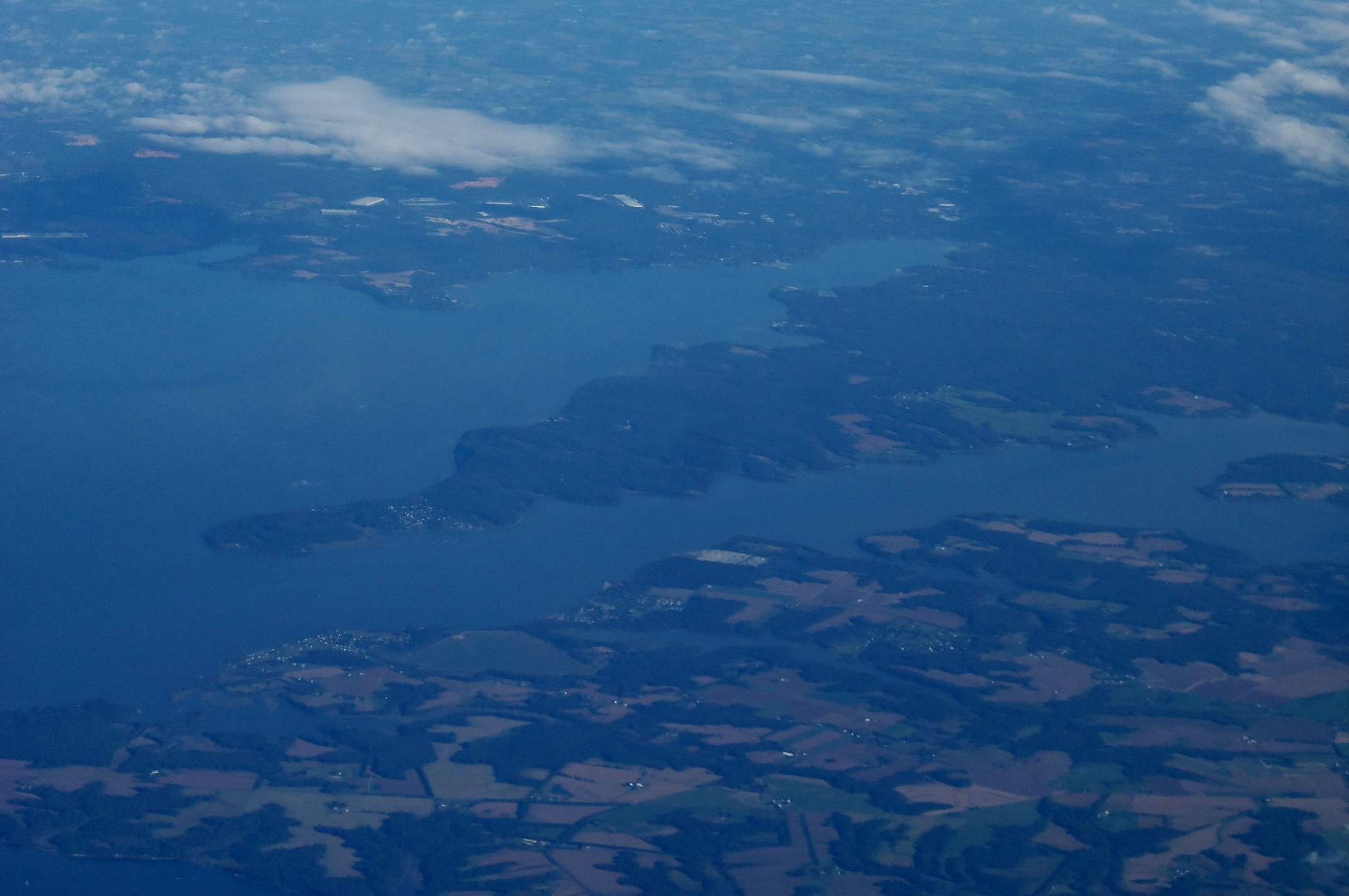
Elk Neck (center), bounded by the Elk River in the foreground and the North East River beyond

Elk Neck State Park is a Maryland state park located between the Chesapeake Bay and the Elk River near the southern tip of the Elk Neck Peninsula in Cecil County, Maryland. The park is home to the historic Turkey Point Light and offers land-based and water-based recreation. The park is located on MD 272, eight miles (13 km) south of the town of North East, and 13 miles (21 km) south of exit 100 on I-95. It is operated by the Maryland Department of Natural Resources.

== History ==
The park had its genesis when, in 1936, naturalist Dr. William Abbott bequeathed his holdings along the Elk River to the state for use as a state park. Although he originally intended the land to be a gift to the Boy Scouts, a meeting with State Forester Fred W. Besley in 1935 persuaded Abbott to change the terms of his will. Following the state's purchase of additional acreage, the Civilian Conservation Corps created park improvements from 1937 to 1941.

== Activities and amenities ==
Turkey Point Lighthouse

Dating from 1833, the Turkey Point Lighthouse sits on a 100-foot (30 m) bluff overlooking the Upper Chesapeake Bay. The 35-foot (11 m) tower is a "private aid to navigation" maintained by a non-profit organization, Turkey Point Light Station, Inc., which offers weekend tours seasonally.

Campgrounds

The park offers more than 250 campsites, rustic cabins, camper cabins, and youth group sites.

Water recreation

The park offers a swimming beach, fishing, and crabbing, plus a boat launch and launch area for canoeing and kayaking.

Trails

The park has 12 miles (19 km) of trails for hiking and biking.

Trail Name	Length	Difficulty
White Banks Trail	3 miles (4.8 km)	Difficult
Pond Loop	1 mile (1.6 km)	Moderate
Beaver Marsh Loop	4 miles (6.4 km)	Difficult
Lighthouse Trail	2 miles (3.2 km)	Easy

== Ecology ==
The park is part of the Northeastern coastal forests ecoregion, with a landscape characterized by deep forests, bluffs, beaches, and marshlands.

== In popular culture ==
The park was used as a filming location for the 1997 Clint Eastwood movie Absolute Power, The Curve, and as the setting of an episode of the television series Hannibal.
