= Turkey Point =

Turkey Point may refer to:

- Turkey Point, Ontario, a Canadian village
- Turkey Point Nuclear Generating Station, a nuclear power station in Florida
- Turkey Point Light, a lighthouse in Maryland
