= Mount Nebo State Forest =

Protected area in Maryland, United States

- Mount Nebo Wildlife Management Area
- Location within Maryland Location within the United States
- Location: Garrett County, Maryland
- Nearest city: Oakland, MD
- Coordinates: 39°26′44″N 79°23′18″W
- Area: 1,887 acres (7.64 km^{2})
- Established: 2006
- Governing body: Maryland Department of Natural Resources

Mount Nebo State Forest is a 1,887-acre (764 ha) state forest in the state of Maryland.
