= Wicomico Demonstration Forest =

Protected forested area in Maryland

Coordinates: 38°21′20″N 75°26′10″W

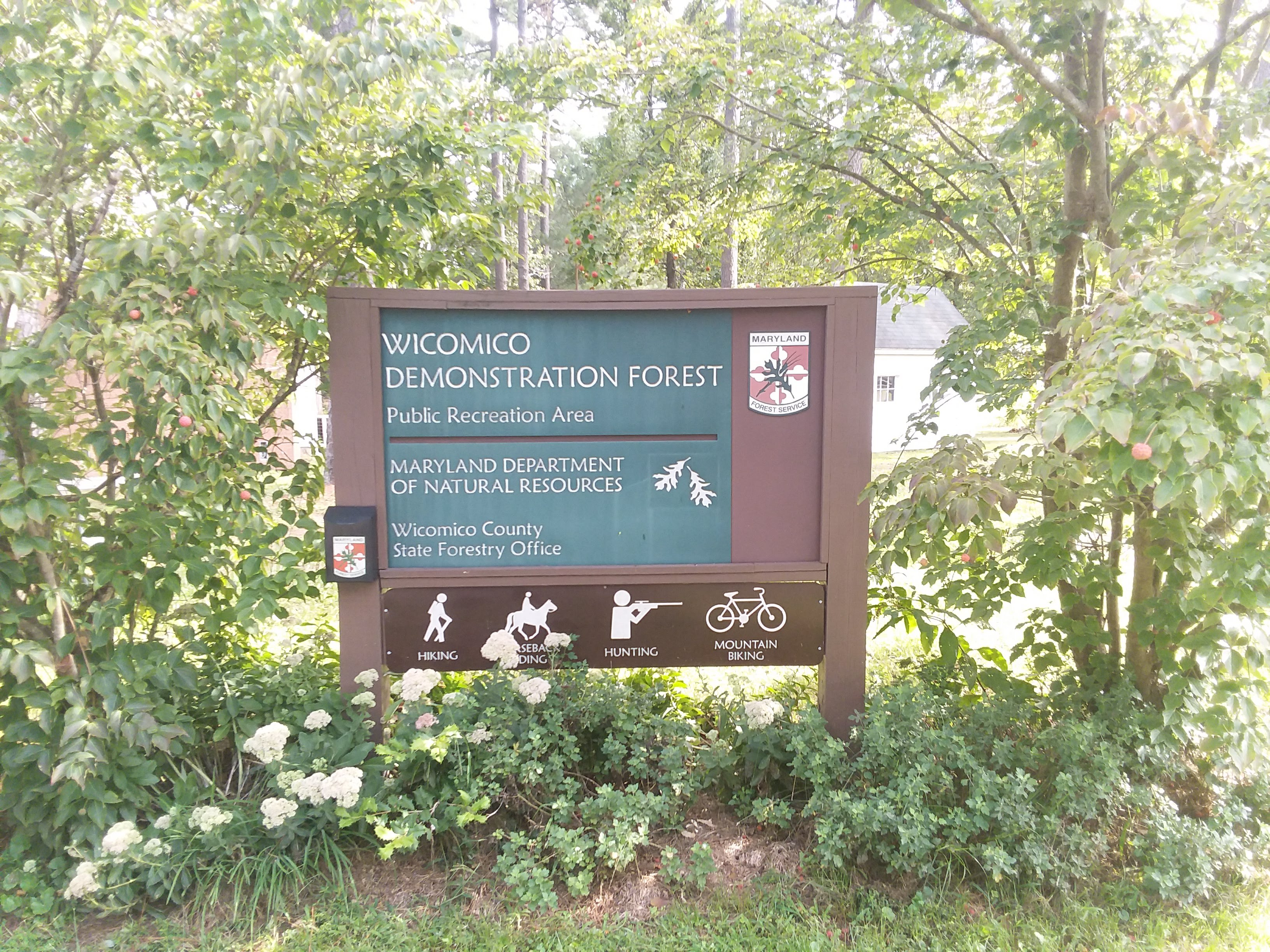
- Interactive map of Wicomico Demonstration Forest
- Location: Wicomico County, Maryland, US
- Nearest city: Salisbury, Maryland
- Established: 1936
- Governing body: Maryland Department of Natural Resources

Wicomico Demonstration Forest is primarily forested land. This area is used by the Maryland Forest Service to demonstrate various timber management techniques and practices.

Six marked recreational trails (4 loops, 2 connecting) are offered, ranging from short hikes to longer day trips. Motorized vehicles are prohibited on trails, however hiking, horseback riding and bicycling are acceptable uses, trail conditions permitting.
