= Augustine Beach Hotel =

Historic hotel in Delaware, US

- U.S. National Register of Historic Places
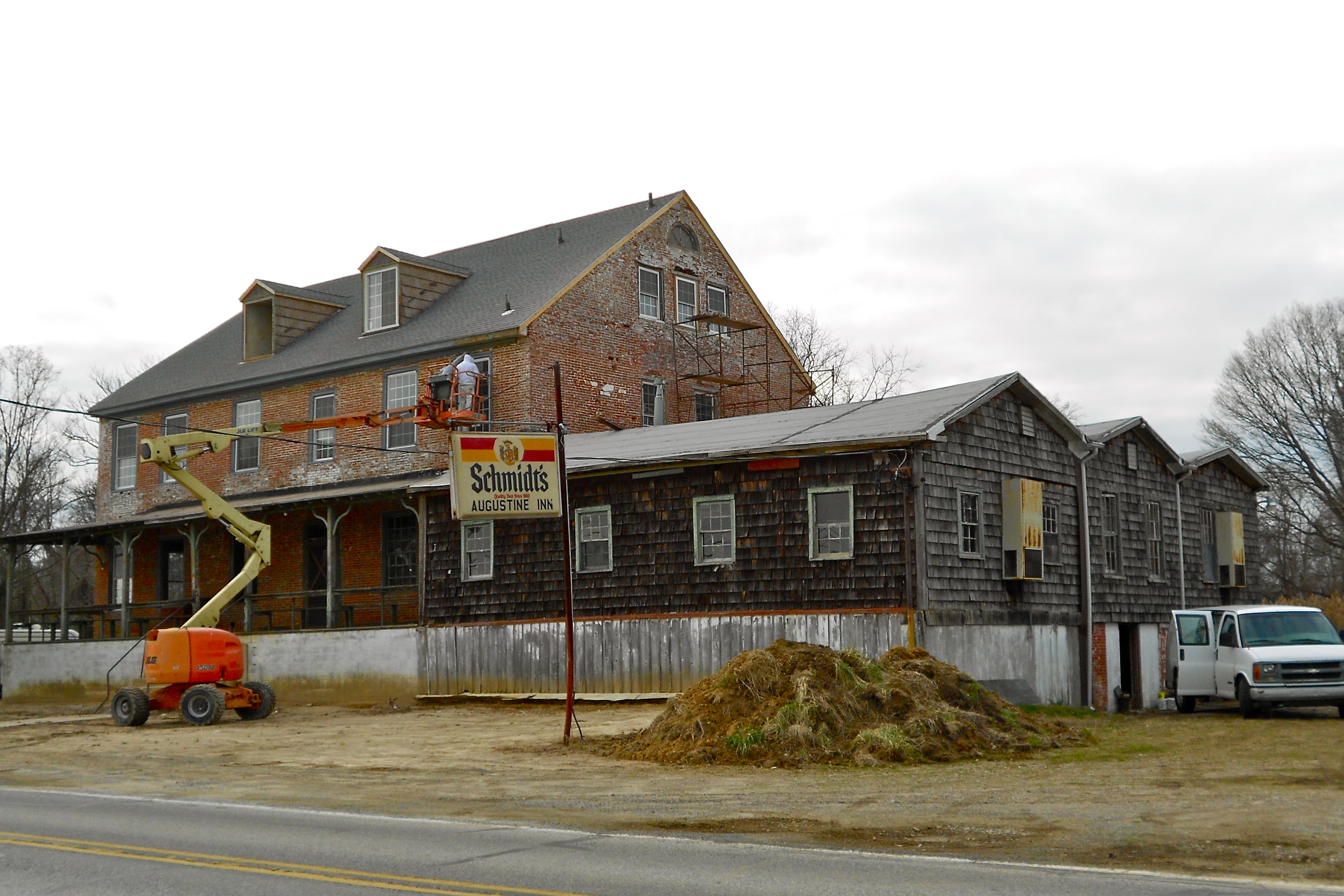
- Augustine Beach Hotel, December 2011

- Location within Delaware Location within the United States
- Location: South of Port Penn on Delaware Route 9, near Port Penn, Delaware
- Coordinates: 39°30′27″N 75°34′47″W
- Area: 5 acres (2.0 ha)
- NRHP reference No.: 73000537
- Added to NRHP: April 3, 1973

Augustine Beach Hotel is a historic hotel located at Augustine Beach near Port Penn in New Castle County, Delaware, United States. It was erected about 1814, and is a two-story, six bay by three bay, brick building with a gable roof. It has a hipped roof porch and a five bay, shed-roofed brick dependency. Its peak period of use was between about 1870 and 1920. The Hotel derives its name from one of the most colorful of Delaware's early inhabitants, Augustine Herrmann.

It was listed on the National Register of Historic Places in 1973.
