= Stoney Demonstration Forest =

Protected area in Maryland, United States

Coordinates: 39°30′50″N 76°15′0″W

Stoney Demonstration Forest is a state forest located in Aberdeen, Maryland, United States.

The forest serves as an educational resource, the main objective of which is to teach silviculture, forest management, and wildlife habitat management practices to students and landowners. The forest occupies 318 acres (129 ha) of the rural Harford county. It was originally owned by Sydney Peverly up until 1981 when the state of Maryland purchased the land. The forest consists of rock cliffs ranging from 40 to 80 feet (12 to 24 m) in height.
