= Potomac State Forest =

Protected area in Maryland, United States

Coordinates: 39°29′31″N 79°27′26″W

Potomac State Forest is an 11,535-acre state forest in the state of Maryland near Oakland.

The forest offers a wide range of outdoor recreation opportunities, such as cross-country skiing, camping, fishing, hiking, and hunting.

== See also ==
- Maryland Forest Service - Official Site
- List of Maryland state forests
