= Cedarville State Forest =

Protected area in Maryland, United States

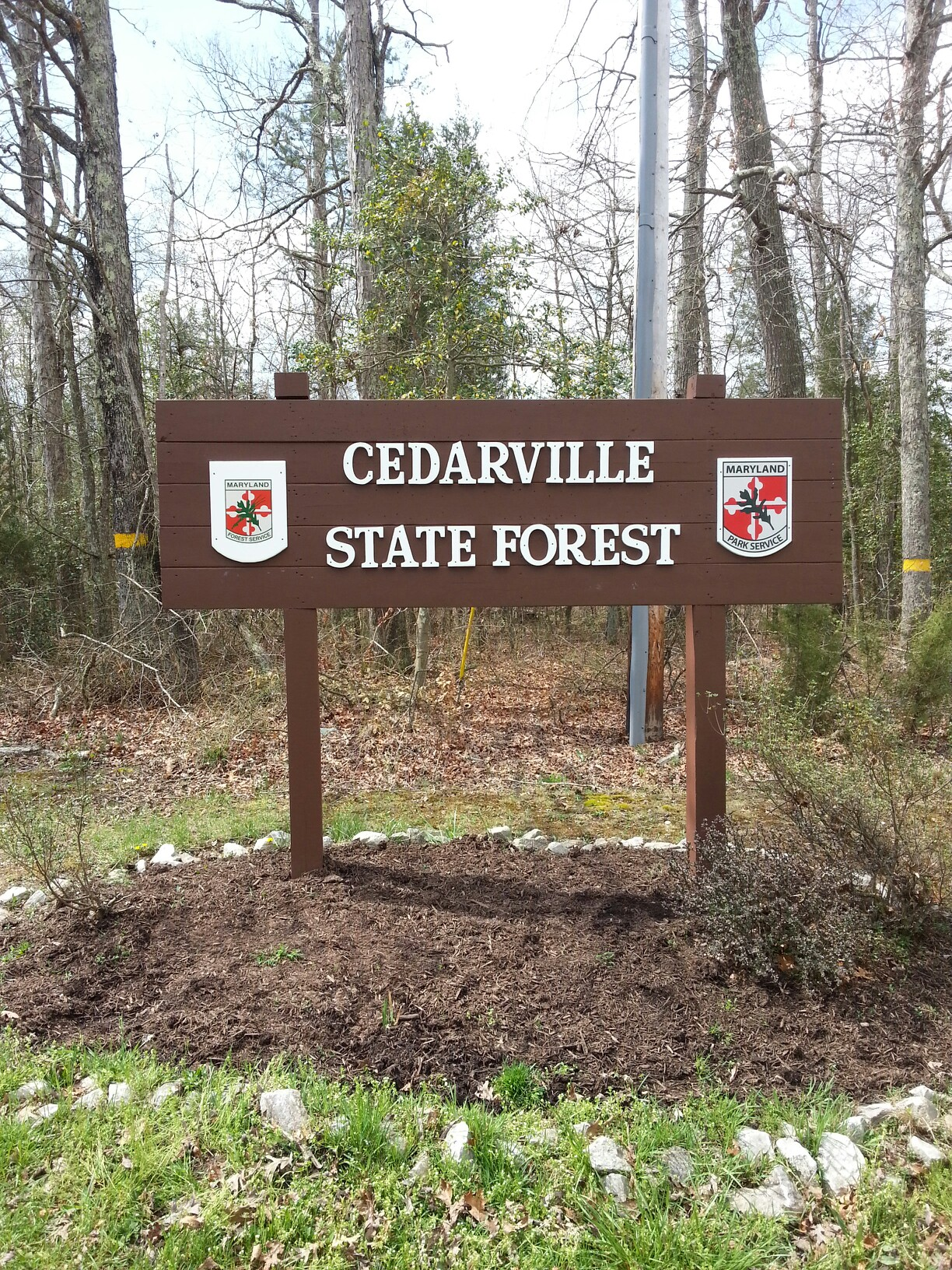
Entrance to Cedarville State Forest

Cedarville State Forest (38°38′25″N 76°49′13″W) is a state forest and protected area in the state of Maryland, near Brandywine, Cedarville, and Waldorf. It offers trails, campsites (family, youth group, and equestrian), a fishing pond, hunting land, and picnic and recreation areas. Trails are available for hikers, bikers and horse riders.

The Piscataway Indian Tribe made this section of Southern Maryland its winter camping ground because of the mild climate and abundance of game.

The headwaters of the Zekiah Swamp are located in Cedarville. The swamp extends Southward through Charles County for 20 miles, emptying into the Wicomico River. The Swamp is one mile wide and serves as a haven for wildlife. In colonial times and there after efforts were made to drain the swamp for cultivation. Drainage ditches are still evident. To this day, the swamp remains wooded bottom land.

In 1930, the Maryland Department of Natural Resources, Forest, Park and Wildlife Service purchased 2,631 acres of land for a forest demonstration area. Later 879 more acres were added to bring the total to 3,510 acres.

In 1933, the Civilian Conservation Corps, under the direction of President Franklin D. Roosevelt, developed roads and trails for fire protection and future access for the development of the area.

== Plants ==
Cedarville is home to multiple species of carnivorous plants, such as the Drosera rotundifolia (roundleaf sundew) and Sarracenia purpurea (northern pitcher plant). The forest is also home to Sphagnum (sphagnum moss), Rhexia mariana (Maryland meadowbeauty), Polygala (milkwort), and Scutellaria lateriflora (Hyssop skullcap).

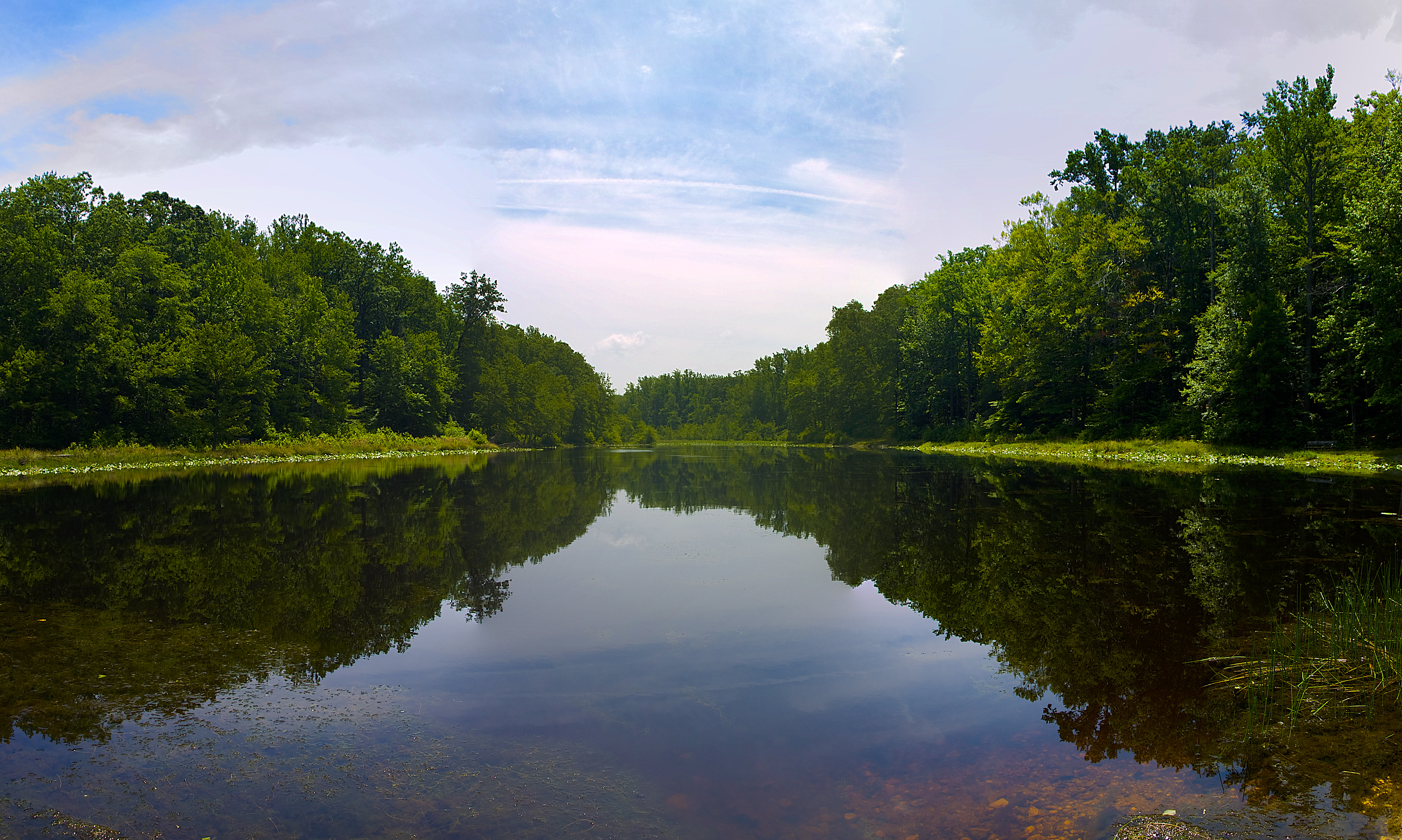
A pond in Cedarville State Forest
