= List of Maryland state forests =

The state of Maryland contains 145,394 acres (588.39 km^{2}) of designated state forest which are managed by the Maryland Forest Service.

The following is a list of Maryland state forests.

== State forests ==
Name (by alphabetical order)	Location (of main entrance)
Cedarville State Forest	Brandywine
Elk Neck State Forest	Cecil County
Garrett State Forest	Oakland
Green Ridge State Forest	Allegany County
Pocomoke State Forest	Snow Hill
Potomac State Forest	Oakland
St. Inigoes State Forest	St. Mary's County
Salem State Forest	St. Mary's County
Savage River State Forest	Grantsville

== Demonstration forests ==
Doncaster Demonstration Forest	Charles County
Seth Demonstration Forepert	Talbot County
Wicomico Demonstration Forest	Wicomico County
Stoney Demonstration Forest	Talbot County

== Forest lands ==
- Chesapeake Forest Lands

== See also ==
- List of national forests of the United States
- List of Maryland wildlife management areas
