= Elk Neck State Forest =

Protected area in Maryland, United States

Elk Neck State Forest, Maryland, USA
- Location within Maryland Location within the United States
- Location: Cecil County, Maryland, USA
- Nearest city: North East, Maryland
- Coordinates: 39°35′3″N 75°54′20″W
- Area: 3,300 acres (13.35 km^{2})
- Governing body: Maryland Department of Natural Resources

Elk Neck State Forest belongs to the Maryland Department of Natural Resources and is managed by the Maryland Forest Service, and is adjacent to the town of North East, in Cecil County. It is often confused with Elk Neck State Park, which lies further south, near the end of the same peninsula.

The main entrance to the state forest (with a parking lot and office) runs north off of Irishtown Road. Other entrances, blocked by gates (to deter vehicles), are located on Huminski Road and Starkey Lane. Visitors to the state forest who are not using the shooting-ranges can park for free. Users of the shooting-ranges need to acquire permits under a self-service honor-system.

This nature area, consisting of 3,300 acres (13 km^{2}), provides hiking trails, hunting opportunities (during legally established hunting seasons), and ranges for archery and for handgun- and rifle-shooting. A portion of the Mason-Dixon Trail runs through this state forest. Although there is a reduced-size area-map of the state forest online, a larger, more detailed map (including Elk Neck State Park) can be purchased from the Maryland Dept. of Natural Resources.

Elk Neck State Forest is part of the Northeastern coastal forests ecoregion. It contains wooded flatland, rolling hills, and marshlands. Plum Creek and Plum Creek Pond form an important water-feature in the south-central area.

The primary, wide, gravel roads within the state forest—labeled as Trails 1, 2, and 3 -- allow limited vehicle traffic (starting from the main entrance, where Trail 1 begins). These forest roads are flanked by thick woods (mixed deciduous trees and evergreens) and provide entrances (for hikers) into some forest-trails. There are small parking areas along these roads, as well as several marked small meadows with blind hunting structures, including one for handicapped hunters. The northwestern corner of Trail 1, in particular, is the location of the shooting ranges.

== Sources ==
- Elk Neck State Forest
