= Anna Hack Boot =

Early colonial businesswoman

Anna Hack Boot (née Varlett; ca. 1626 – July 8, 1685) was an early Dutch settler in Early America who carried on extensive trading activities (including the slave trade) throughout the Atlantic. Anna was one of the first women business owners and entrepreneurs in America. According to historians, Anna's life serves as an example of how Dutch women in early modern Europe and America were "more commonly engaged in long-distance trade" than women from other backgrounds, and "acted as merchants and as their husband's business partners."

== Early life and family ==
Anna was born around 1626 in Utrecht, Netherlands, daughter of Caspar Varlett (sometimes spelled "Varleth") and Judith Tentenier. Her sister was Jannetje Varleth, the wife of Bohemian explorer and merchant Augustine Herman, First Lord of Bohemia Manor.

Anna and her family likely arrived in British America in the 1640s and lived for a period in New Amsterdam, now known as New York City, and later in Accomack County, Virginia. They became English subjects and Anna was naturalized as a citizen in Maryland in 1666, after their citizenship in the Colony of Virginia was denied.

Anna was twice married, first to German-born surgeon Dr. Joris "George" Hack and later to Nicholas Boot (sometimes spelled "Boote") and had three children.

== Business activities ==
As a businessperson, Anna bought and sold land and real estate holdings, engaged in multinational trading (including the Atlantic slave trade), engaged in the trading of manufactured goods and of white indentured servants, and was the eventual owner of a ship, "The Fortune," in New Amsterdam.

Anna was an associate and business partner to her brother-in-law Augustine. Through her association with Augustine, she became one of the largest exporters of tobacco in America. She had business holdings and owned over 3,000 acres of land in New Amsterdam, Virginia, and Maryland, and largely did business with fellow Dutch traders.

She maintained a number of Caribbean business contacts through her brother Nicholas and was heavily engaged in the slave trade. She traded enslaved persons to the Chesapeake, Virginia area. Anna was one of the first women to file a business lawsuit in Early America, when she successfully appealed a monetary judgement to the General Court of Virginia in the early 1670s.

Anna Hack Boot died on July 8, 1685.
