= Bohemia River =

River in Delaware and Maryland, U.S.

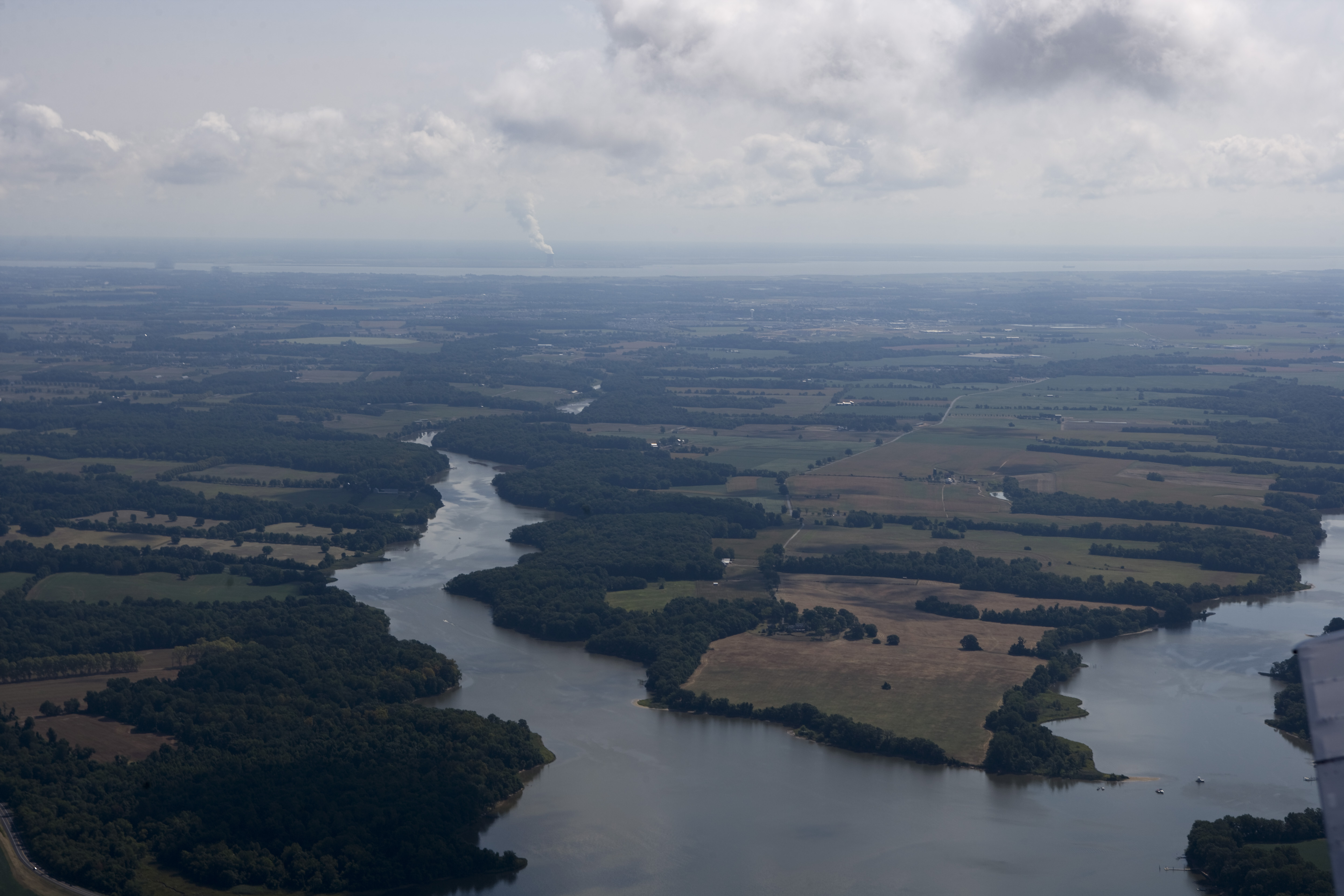
Little Bohemia Creek, August 24, 2008

The Bohemia River is a 4.7-mile-long (7.6 km) tributary of the Elk River on the Delmarva Peninsula. It is located in Cecil County, Maryland, with its headwaters extending into New Castle County, Delaware.

The Bohemia River begins east of Hacks Point, Maryland, where its two major tributaries, Great Bohemia Creek and Little Bohemia Creek, come together, and ends at the Elk River in a wide mouth between Town Point and Ford Landing. Great Bohemia Creek and its tributary, Sandy Branch rise near Middletown, Delaware and Little Bohemia Creek rises near Warwick, Maryland. They flow through the level coastal plain, quickly reaching sea level.

Several small creeks are on the northern shore, including Pooles Creek and Manor Creek. On the southern shore small creeks include Morgan Creek and Scotchman Creek.

The Bohemia River was once known as the Oppoquimimi River, as Native Americans knew it. The river was renamed by Augustine Herman after Bohemia, the country of his birth.

== Location ==
The entry point for the Bohemia River into the Elk River is located at 39.481786°N 75.931149°W, while the point at which the Bohemia River branches into the Great and Little Bohemia Creeks is located at 39.4560771°N 75.861969°W.

== Sources ==
- Bohemia River Association — archived website.
- 7.5-minute series topographic quadrangles. United States Geological Survey.
- U.S. Geological Survey Geographic Names Information System: Bohemia River
- General Highway Map of Cecil County, Maryland (PDF) (Map). Maryland State Highway Administration and United States Federal Government. 2005.
