= David Ross (Continental Congress) =

American planter, lawyer, Army major, and delegate

David Ross (February 12, 1755 – 1800) was an American planter and lawyer from Frederick County, Maryland. He served as a major in the Continental Army in 1777. He was a delegate for Maryland to the Continental Congress from 1787 until 1789.
