= Turkey Point Light =

Lighthouse in Maryland, United States

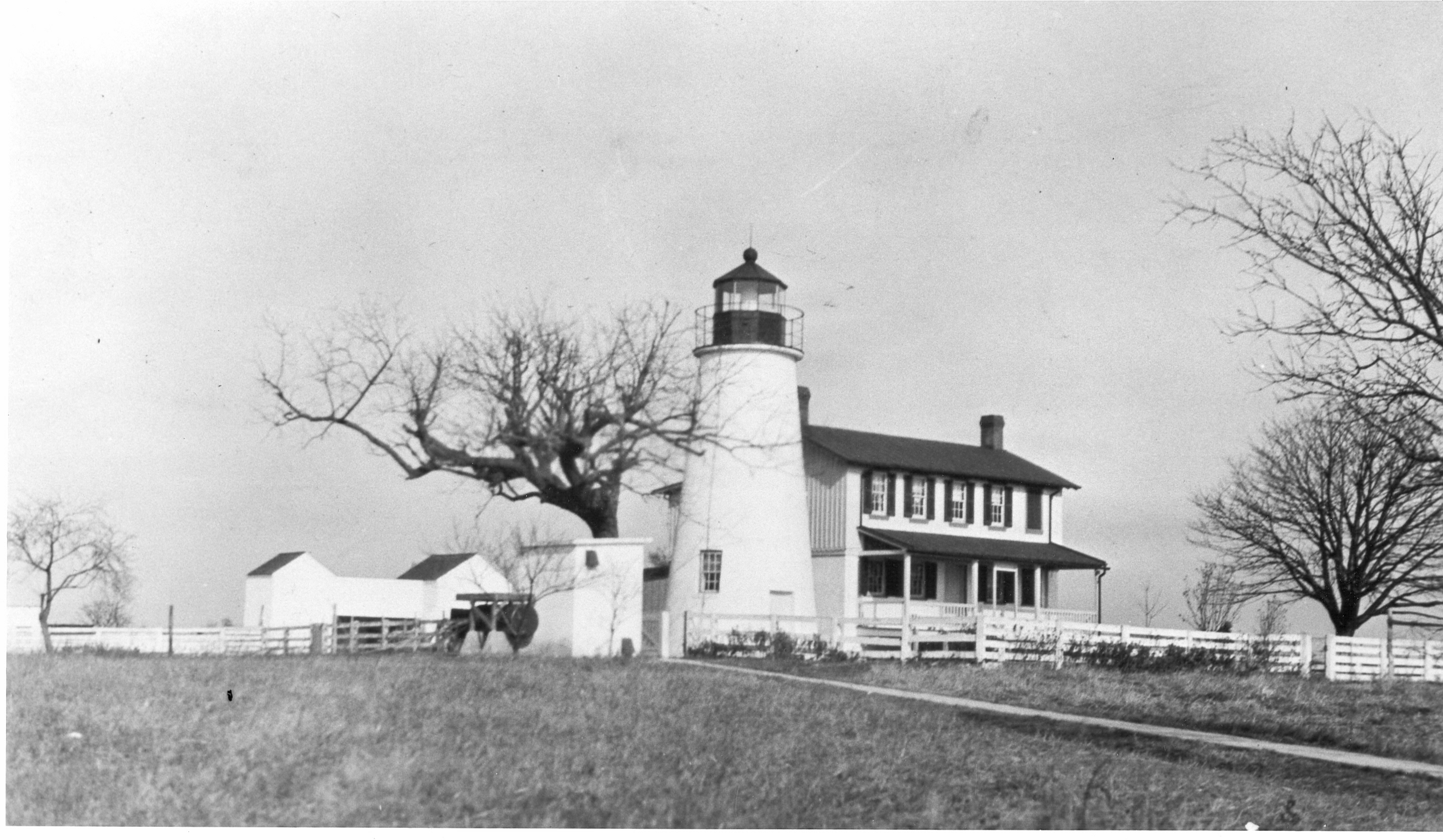
- Taken before 1972 when the house was razed.
- Location: Elk Neck State Park at the head of the Chesapeake Bay
- Coordinates: 39°26′59.578″N 76°0′30.313″W

Tower
- Constructed: 1833
- Construction: brick/masonry
- Automated: 1947
- Height: 35 feet (11 m)
- Shape: conical tower
- Markings: White with black lantern
- Heritage: National Register of Historic Places listed place
- Fog signal: none

Light
- First lit: 1835
- Deactivated: 2000-2002
- Focal height: 129 feet (39 m)
- Lens: fourth-order Fresnel lens, 1855
- Characteristic: Flashing white 6 sec
- Turkey Point Light
- U.S. National Register of Historic Places
- Nearest city: North East, Maryland
- Area: less than one acre
- Built: 1833
- MPS: Light Stations of the United States MPS
- NRHP reference No.: 02001421
- Added to NRHP: December 2, 2002

The Turkey Point Light is a historic lighthouse at the head of the Chesapeake Bay. Although only a 35-foot (11 m) tower, the 100-foot (30 m) height of the bluffs on which it stands makes it the third highest light off the water in the bay. It is also known for the large number of women who served as lightkeeper.

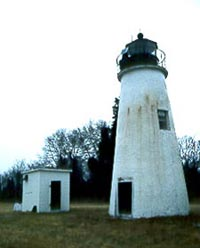
Turkey Point Light in 1995, after the house was torn down.

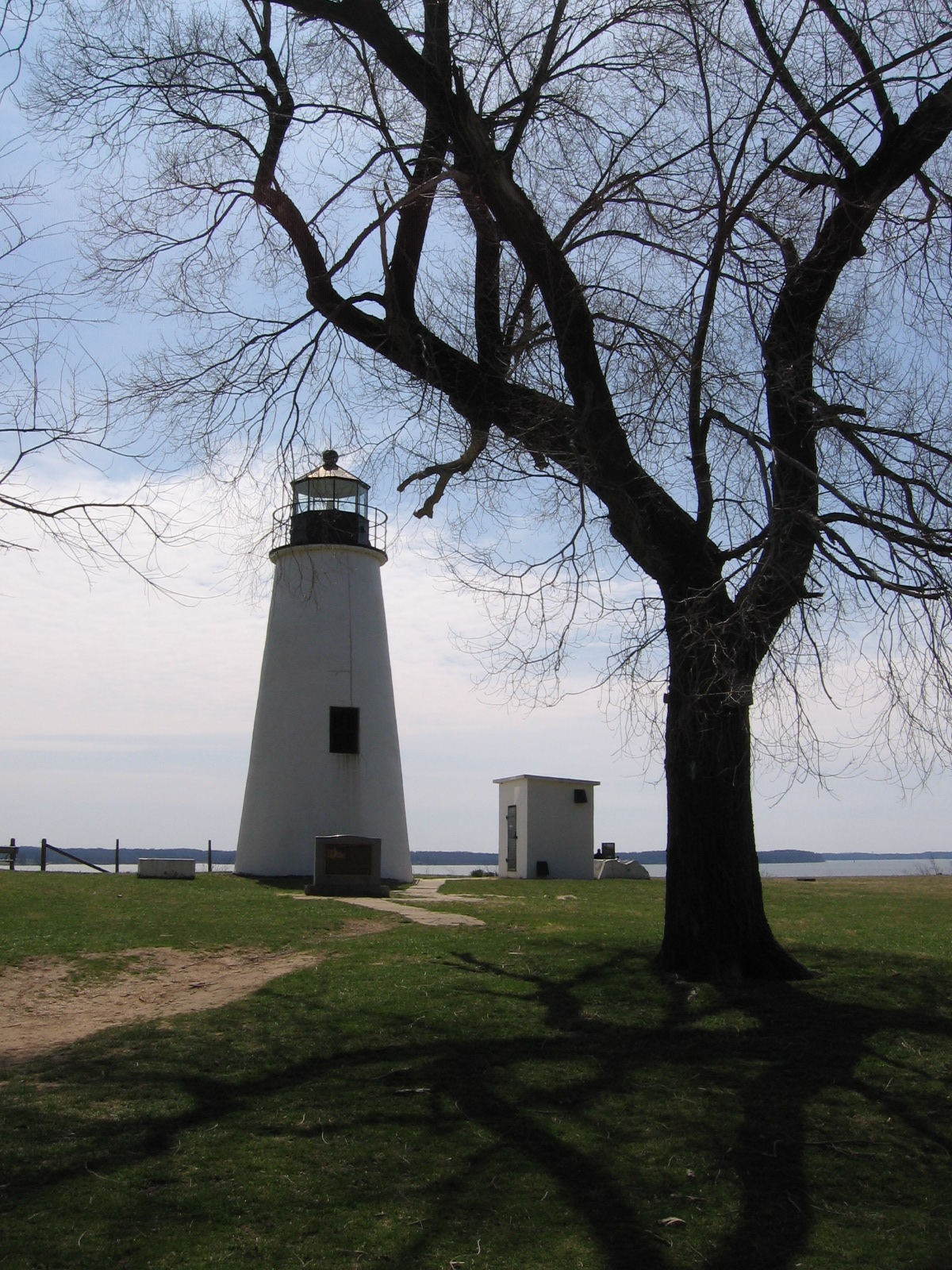
Turkey Point Light, March 2007

== History ==
Congress appropriated $5,000 for this light in early 1833, which was built by John Donahoo and completed in July 1833. He followed essentially the same plan as he had used for Concord Point Light. Acquisition of the land was delayed somewhat by a controversy over valuation.

The light originally used eleven wicks and reflectors, but in 1855 a fourth order Fresnel lens with a single lamp was substituted, with the lantern upgraded in 1867 to fit the new lens better. The lighting arrangements were upgraded several times over the years, with electrification coming in 1942. Its automation in 1947 brought about the retirement of Fannie Salter, the last woman lighthouse keeper in the United States.

Along with the tower, Donahoo built a keeper's house. Originally a single story, it was raised to two stories in 1889. The site also housed an unusual fog bell enclosure, built in 1888. Due to the height of the bluff, it was decided to put the bell as low to the ground as possible. To accommodate the weights for the ringing mechanism, a thirty-foot well was dug and the enclosure placed over them. During World War II a watchtower was placed atop the bell enclosure.

After automation, the tower's remote site made it a target for vandalism. An incident in which the tower was broken into and the lens stolen brought about the removal of a large section of the wooden spiral staircase and the sealing of the entry with a steel door. The keeper's house decayed and was torn down in 1972.

The structure was added to the National Register of Historic Places on December 2, 2002 as Turkey Point Light Station.

In 2000 the light was decommissioned and leased to Turkey Point Light Station (TPLS) Inc., a non-profit organization which has taken over maintenance of the structure; the group reactivated the light as a private aid to navigation in 2002. The group additionally replaced the steel ladder in the lighthouse with a new wooden spiral staircase. On weekends volunteers give tours of the lighthouse including a walk to the top. In 2006, the Coast Guard transferred ownership to the state of Maryland, which then renewed the lease to TPLS. The land around the station is today part of Elk Neck State Park.
