= Maryland Forest Service =

State forestry agency of Maryland, United States

The Maryland Forest Service in 1996 marked the 90th anniversary of forestry in Maryland, United States and the birth of what is known as the Department of Natural Resources Forest Service. Although the service has been known by many names over nine decades, its mission has been consistent: "To conserve and enhance the quality, quantity, productivity and biological diversity of the forest and tree resources of Maryland."

== History ==
When the first colonists arrived in Maryland in the early 1600s, forests covered most of the State. Very little vegetation grew under the age old trees.

One of the settlers wrote this description of the area: "Fine groves of trees appear, not choked with briers or bushes and undergrowth, but growing at intervals as if planted by the hand of man, so that you can drive a four horse carriage, wherever you choose, through the midst of the trees".

In the late 19th century, the nation grew concerned about the abuse of its forest resources, and their protection and management became a politically popular issue.

Gifford Pinchot, the "father of American forestry" and one of Theodore Roosevelt's chief advisors, promoted the concept of wise use and sustained yield of forests.

Fred W. Besley - Father of Maryland's forests

In the year 1900, Pinchot selected sixty-one young men to participate in forestry training and sent them out in groups around the country to collect forest data for twenty-five dollars a month. One of these young men was Fred W. Besley, who six years later would become Maryland's first State Forester and establish one of the first state forestry agencies in the nation.

Begun in 1906, Besley's thirty-six year tenure as State Forester helped place Maryland as one of the Nation's leaders in forest conservation. His appointment coincided with the birth of the state forest system in Maryland that was established by the donation of 2,000 acres (8 km^{2}) of forest land by the Garrett brothers. Robert Garrett, who was a Baltimore investment banker and philanthropist, would later say of Swallow Falls, "My brother and I agreed to donate a State Forest if Maryland would take care of it."

As state forester, Besley enforced the nation’s first Roadside Tree Law. Intended to beautify Maryland’s highways by encouraging utilities and the State Roads Commission to plant and maintain roadside trees, this 1914 law served as a model across the nation. Later, in the 1930s, Besley had to stave off attempts by the University of Maryland to hire his assistant foresters as professors. Despite his disdain for politics, Besley proved very skillful at keeping his agency afloat in a constantly changing and shifting political arena.

The establishment of the Civilian Conservation Corps in 1933 boosted Maryland's forestry substantially. The CCC not only fought fires but also built cabins and other structures on State Forest land and initiated many reforestation projects.

In 1942, Besley retired as the state forester with the longest continuous service as state forester in the nation.

Maryland's Forestry Conservancy District Act of 1943 was one of the most progressive forestry laws in the nation. The act stated, "It is...the policy of the State to encourage economic management and scientific development of its woodlands to maintain, conserve, and improve soil resources of the State to the end that an adequate source of forest products be preserved for the people...".

In the 1950s and 1960s more and more people began to visit Maryland's forests. The general public, as well as professional foresters, recognized the fact that forests were valuable for reasons other than simply supplying timber.

The environmental movement of the 1970s and the 1980s produced a growing awareness of both the benefits and adverse effects of various forest management practices on the ecosystem. Managers began to coordinate their multiple use management practices more effectively with potential environmental, economic, and social impacts.

As of 1990 Maryland has 2.7 million acres of forest land, forty percent of the total acreage that makes up the state. Of this total, 2.4 million acres (90 percent) are classified as timberland. Timberland is defined as land growing at least 20 cubic feet (or the equivalent of twenty-four 2" x 4" x 8' framing studs) of wood on every acre each year with the potential of harvesting it. Examples of areas not classified as timberland include federal and state park land, Christmas tree farms, and forests set aside for scientific study. These figures have remained fairly consistent up through 2014.

== See also ==
- List of Maryland state forests
