= Elk River (Maryland) =

Tidal tributary of the Chesapeake Bay

Coordinates: 39°26′28″N 75°59′59″W

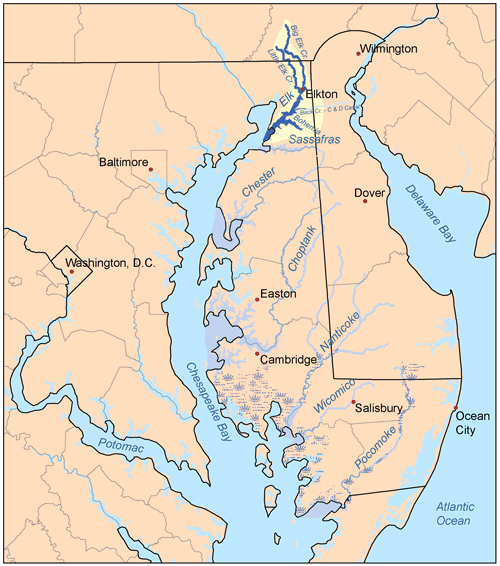
Map of the rivers of the Eastern Shore of Maryland with the Elk and its watershed highlighted.

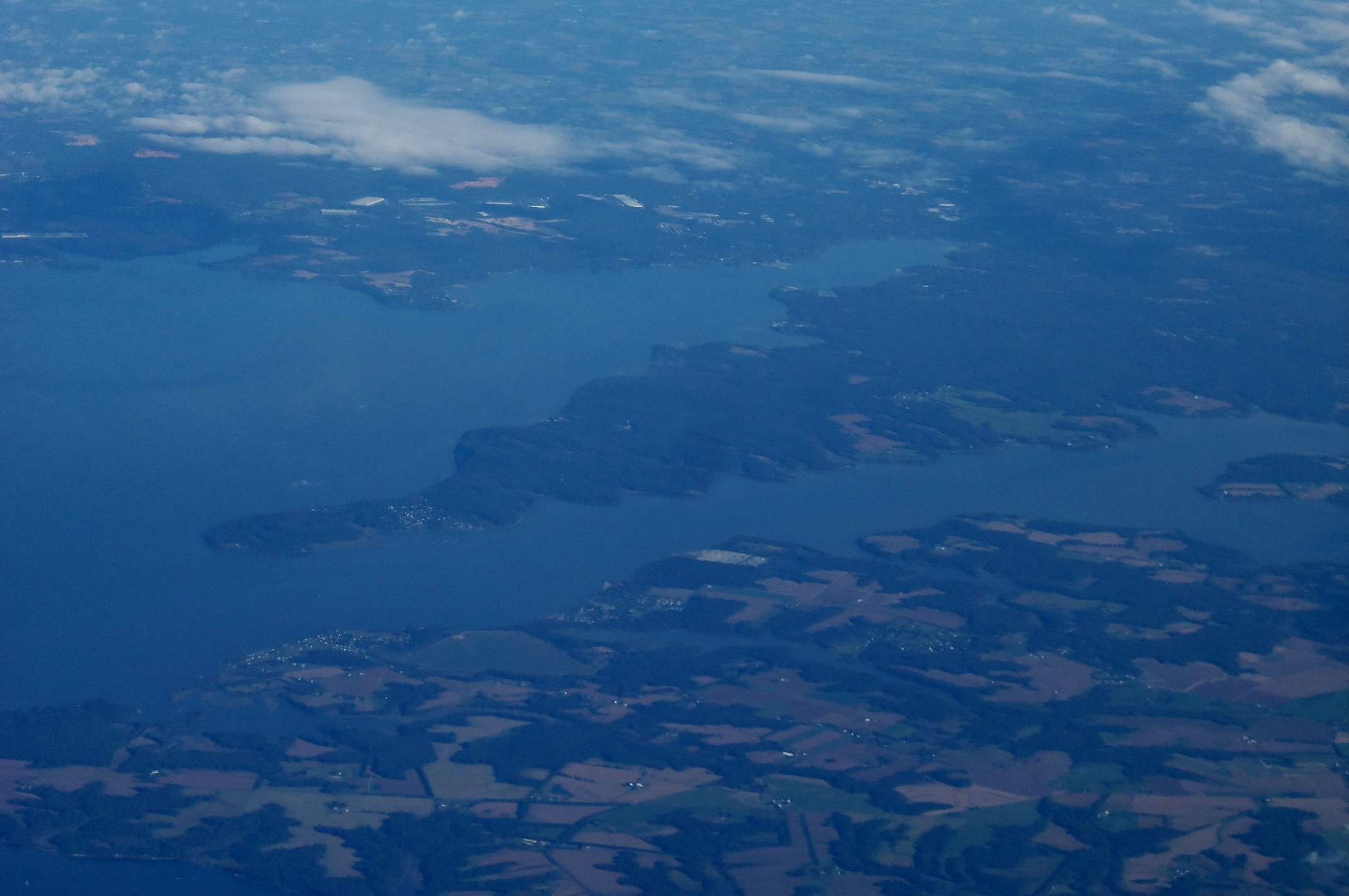
Oblique air photo showing the Elk River in foreground emptying into the Chesapeake Bay

The Elk River is a tidal tributary of the Chesapeake Bay on the Eastern Shore of Maryland and on the northern edge of the Delmarva Peninsula. It is about 15 miles (24 km) long. As the most northeastern extension of the Chesapeake Bay estuary, it has served as one entrance to the Chesapeake & Delaware Canal since the 19th century. The canal and river now serve as one boundary of the Elk Neck Peninsula. The river flows through Cecil County, Maryland, with its watershed extending into New Castle County, Delaware and Chester County, Pennsylvania. Elkton, the county seat of Cecil County, is located at its head. Its total watershed area is 143 square miles (370 km^{2}) (including the Bohemia River), with 21 square miles (54 km^{2}) of open water, so its watershed is 15% open water. It is south and east of the North East River, and north of the Sassafras River.

== Course ==
The Elk River begins at the confluence of Big Elk Creek and Little Elk Creek in Elkton, and ends at the Chesapeake Bay at a 1.4 miles (2.3 km) wide mouth between Turkey Point on Elk Neck and West View Shores / Sunset Point. Little Elk Creek rises near Oxford, Pennsylvania, and the East Branch and West Branch of Big Elk Creek rise to the south of Cochranville, Pennsylvania. They descend through the Pennsylvania and Maryland Piedmont, before reaching sea level at Elkton, the head of navigation.

== Tributaries ==
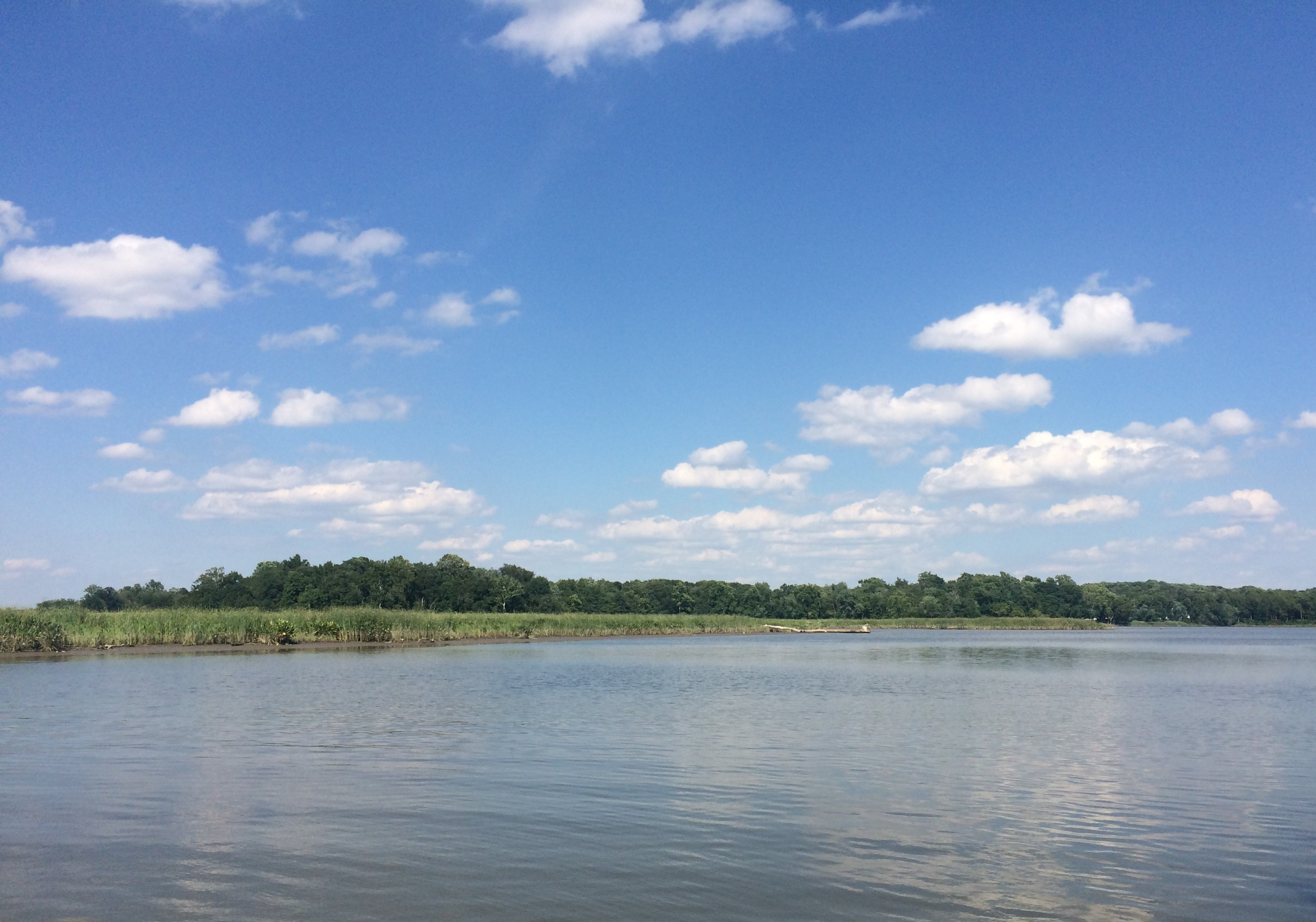
View of the Elk River near Elkton, Maryland

There are several small creeks on the western shore, including Muddy Creek, Jones Creek, Bull Minnow Run, and Plum Creek. On the eastern shore major tributaries are Back Creek, much of which is now the Chesapeake & Delaware Canal, and the Bohemia River. Small creeks include Pearce Creek, Cabin John Creek, Herring Creek, and Perch Creek.
