= U.S. Route 301 =

Highway in the United States

U.S. Route 301
- US 301 highlighted in red

Route information
- Auxiliary route of US 1
- Length: 1,099 mi (1,769 km)
- Existed: 1932–present

Major junctions
- South end: US 41 in Sarasota, FL
- I-75 near Tampa, FL; I-10 in Baldwin, FL; I-16 near Register, GA; I-26 near Orangeburg, SC; I-95 at numerous locations; I-74 / US 74 near McDonald, NC; US 64 in Rocky Mount, NC; I-64 in Richmond, VA; US 50 near Bowie, MD; I-97 near Annapolis, MD
- North end: DE 1 in Biddles Corner, DE

Location
- Country: United States
- States: Florida, Georgia, South Carolina, North Carolina, Virginia, Maryland, Delaware

Highway system
- United States Numbered Highway System; List; Special; Divided

U.S. Route 301 (US 301) is a spur of U.S. Route 1 running through the South Atlantic states. It runs 1,099 miles (1,769 km) from Biddles Corner, Delaware, at Delaware Route 1 to Sarasota, Florida, at U.S. Route 41. It passes through the states of Delaware, Maryland, Virginia, North Carolina, South Carolina, Georgia, and Florida. It goes through the cities of Middletown, Delaware; Annapolis, Maryland; Richmond and Petersburg, Virginia; Rocky Mount, Wilson, and Fayetteville, North Carolina; Florence, South Carolina; Statesboro and Jesup, Georgia; and Jacksonville, Ocala, Zephyrhills, and Sarasota, Florida.

US 301 is paralleled by Interstate 95 for much of its routing through The Carolinas and Virginia including short concurrencies in Santee, South Carolina, and Lumberton, North Carolina. It has a number of other concurrencies along its route.

As originally commissioned, US 301's northern terminus was at US 1 in Petersburg, Virginia. The original southern end was at a junction with then-US 17 between Florence and Marion, South Carolina.

== Route description ==
Lengths
	mi	km
FL	266	428
GA	169	272
SC	190.3	306.3
NC	194	312.2
VA	145	233
MD	123.30	198.43
DE	11.9	24.03
Total	1099	1,769

=== Florida ===
Concurrencies in Florida include US 1/23 between Folkston (Georgia) and Callahan, US 441 between Sparr and Belleview, US 27 between Ocala and Belleview, US 98 between Moss Town and Clinton Heights (near Dade City), and US 41 between Palmetto and South Bradenton. The road is also shared by the DeSoto Trail south of Bushnell.

=== Georgia ===
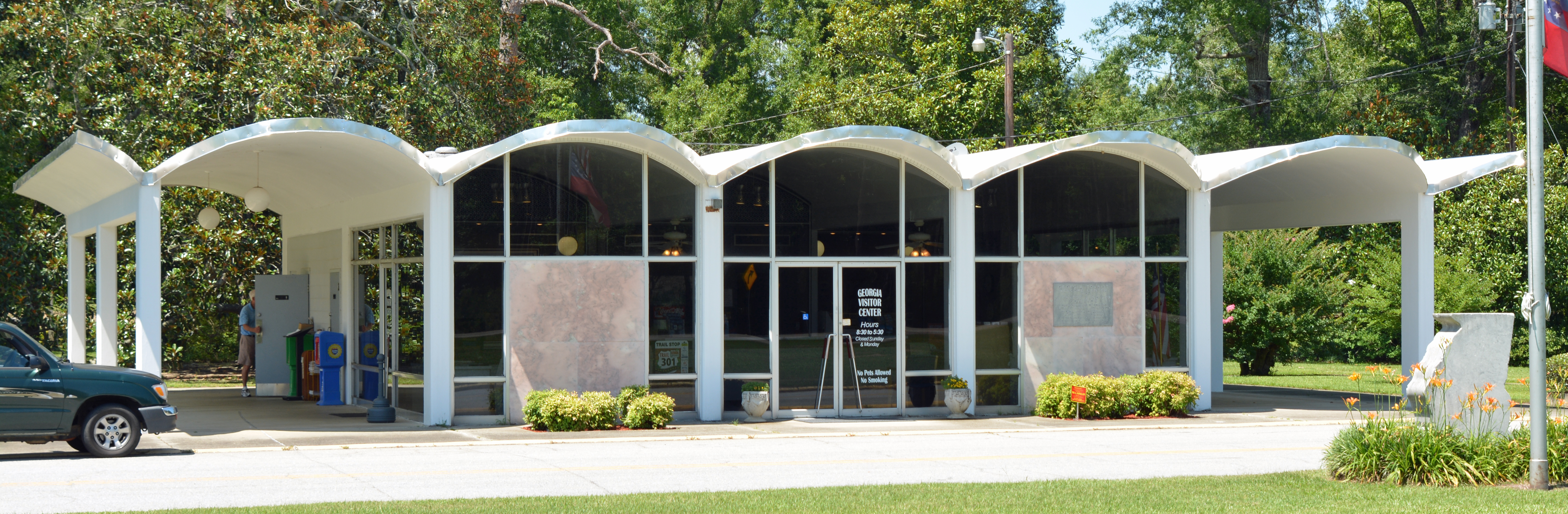
Georgia Welcome Center in Screven County

In Georgia, US 301 is signed concurrently with various state routes. It uses SR 4/SR 15 from Florida to Folkston, SR 23 from Folkston to Glennville, and SR 73 from Glennville to South Carolina. Large portions of US 301 in Georgia are concurrent with US 25.

US 301 enters Georgia from Florida concurrent with US 1/US 23, also designated as SR 4/SR 15, on a bridge over the St. Marys River. In Folkston, SR 23/SR 121 join. US 1/US 23/SR 4/SR 15/SR 121 split to the northwest at a junction north of Folkston, leaving only US 301 and SR 23 to head north across US 82/SR 520 at Nahunta to Jesup.

At Jesup, US 301 crosses US 341/SR 27, where US 25 turns from US 341 onto US 301, and then merges with US 84/SR 38. The combined routes (US 25/US 84/US 301/SR 23/SR 38) cross the Altamaha River to the junction with SR 57 in Ludowici. There US 84 and SR 38 continue northeast, while US 25/US 301/SR 23 turn northwest with SR 57.

SR 23 and SR 57 split off to the northwest at Glennville. SR 73 begins there, taking US 25 and US 301 north from Glenville across US 280/SR 30 at Claxton and I-16/SR 404 to Statesboro.

US 25 and US 301 meet US 80/SR 26 and SR 67 in Statesboro. SR 67 joins south of the US 80/SR 26 crossing and then turns west with US 80/SR 26, as does US 25; US 25 and SR 67 split from US 80/SR 26 about 7 miles (11 km) to the west. US 301 and SR 73 continue north from Statesboro through Sylvania to the Savannah River and the border with South Carolina.

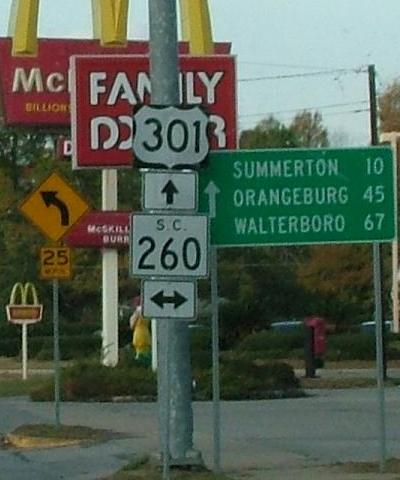
US 301 at SC 260 junction in Manning, SC

=== South Carolina ===
US 301 enters South Carolina over the Savannah River southwest of Allendale. Concurrencies include U.S. 321 in and around Ulmer, U.S. 601 between Bamberg and Orangeburg, then I-95/U.S. 15 Santee, at Exit 97 before all three move across Lake Marion. The U.S. 15-301 multiplex leaves I-95 at Exit 102, running in close proximity to I-95, but U.S. 15 breaks away at Summerton. Other concurrencies include U.S. 521 in Manning, U.S. 52 between Effingham and just south of Florence, U.S. 76 eastbound from east of Florence until Pee Dee, and finally joins U.S. 501 in Latta, where they both approach the South of the Border roadside attraction complex at the interchange with I-95 on the North Carolina-South Carolina border.

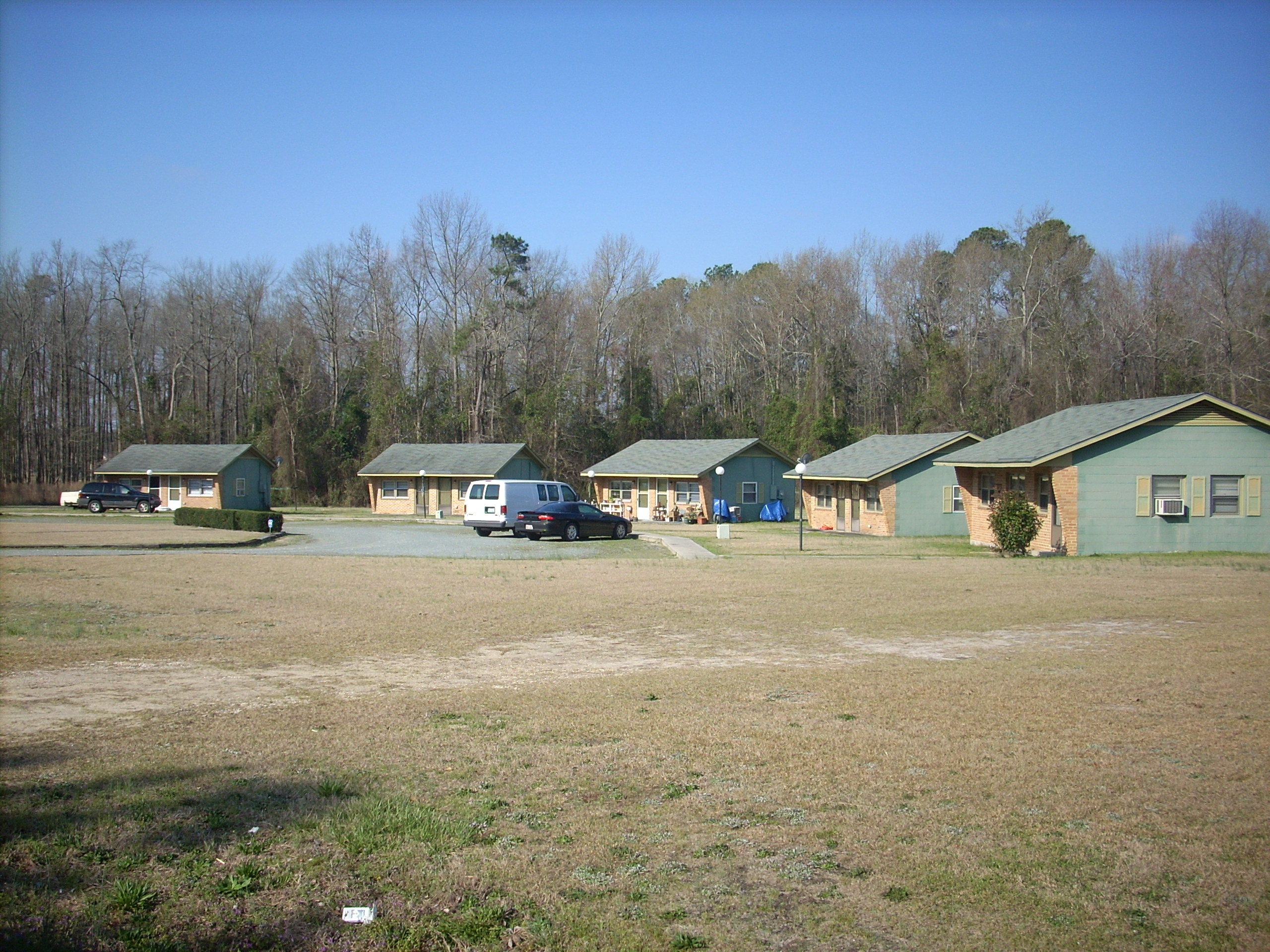
This former motel, now residential housing, sits on US 301 in Wade, NC

=== North Carolina ===
US 301-501 enters North Carolina at the interchange with I-95 where it passes the South of the Border roadside attraction complex, then is closely paralleled by I-95 throughout North Carolina. Concurrencies include US 501 between Latta (South Carolina) and Rowland, I-95 between exit 10 and exit 22 in Lumberton, I-95 BL in Fayetteville, and US 158 between Weldon and Garysburg.

=== Virginia ===
Entering Virginia just south of the community of Skippers, the route is paralleled by I-95 though much of the Southside region of Virginia, often times serving as the frontage road for I-95, deviating from it only in the city of Emporia, where it takes a more direct route through the center of the city. In the Richmond metro area, it passes through the historic centers of the cities of Petersburg (where it meets its parent route, U.S. 1) and Colonial Heights. Passing east of Chester, the two conjoined routes enter Richmond and pass through the Manchester portion of the city along a major boulevard, crossing the James River along the Robert E. Lee Memorial Bridge over Belle Isle Park, and following Belvidere Street and Chamberlayne Avenue through central Richmond. At the extreme northern border of Richmond, the two routes split again, with U.S. 301 veering to the northeast past the community of Mechanicsville, Virginia and turning back to the north.

Traveling through numerous rural areas and small communities of central Virginia, the route turns northeast along a bypass around Bowling Green and passing close to Fort Walker as it turns to a more east-northeasterly direction, leaving the state in Dahlgren on the Harry W. Nice Memorial Bridge across the Potomac River.

=== Maryland ===
U.S. Route 301 enters Maryland along the Governor Harry W. Nice Memorial Bridge across the Potomac River from Virginia. A four-lane highway through most of the state, it is known locally as the Crain Highway and it connects several rural communities and small exurbs at the outer edges of the Washington metropolitan area, connecting communities such as La Plata, St. Charles, Waldorf and Upper Marlboro. The route follows a generally northeast-southwest alignment until Bowie, where it leaves the Crain Highway (which continues on as Maryland Route 3) and joins the John Hanson Highway/U.S. Route 50, which also carries the hidden designation of I-595.

The John Hanson Highway is a freeway that travels roughly due east-west and carries both U.S. 50 and U.S. 301 into and through Annapolis, where the name changes to Blue Star Memorial Highway. The freeway continues onto Maryland's Eastern Shore via the Chesapeake Bay Bridge, passing across Kent Island. At the end of the freeway, the two routes split, each following a four-lane divided road through the eastern shore, with U.S. 50 going generally south and U.S. 301 going generally north.

The four lane divided road continues generally northeast through the rural Eastern Shore region before crossing into Delaware and becoming a freeway.

=== Delaware ===
US 301 in Delaware is a four-lane tolled freeway that enters the state from Maryland and heads northeast past Middletown before coming to its northern terminus at an interchange with Delaware Route 1 in Biddles Corner, south of the Senator William V. Roth Jr. Bridge over the Chesapeake & Delaware Canal in St. Georges. The new alignment opened in January 2019 and replaces the former routing that ended at U.S. Route 40 in Glasgow.

== History ==
US 301 was established in 1932 as a replacement of the piece of US 17-1 north of Wilson and the whole of US 217. Thus US 301 initially ran from US 17 (now US 76) at Pee Dee, South Carolina northeast through Dillon, Lumberton, Fayetteville, Dunn, Smithfield, Wilson, Rocky Mount, and Emporia, ending at US 1 in Petersburg, Virginia. This entire route is now paralleled by Interstate 95. US 301 was at one time alternately referred to as Federal Route No. 301 early in its existence.

A US 301 shield used in Florida prior to 1993

In 1935, US 301 was extended southwest to US 15 at Summerton. This extension took it west on US 76 (formerly US 17) to Florence and south on US 52 (also formerly US 17) to Effingham. There it split to the southwest, running along what had been SC 4 via Manning to Summerton. This again runs parallel to Interstate 95.

The next extension was to the north in late 1940, coinciding with the opening of the Potomac River Bridge. US 301 was extended north along US 1 from Petersburg to Richmond, then north on SR 2 to Bowling Green, and northeast on SR 207 to the bridge. In Maryland it continued along the new alignment off the bridge to Newburg, Maryland, and then replaced MD 3 all the way to US 1 in Baltimore, Maryland.

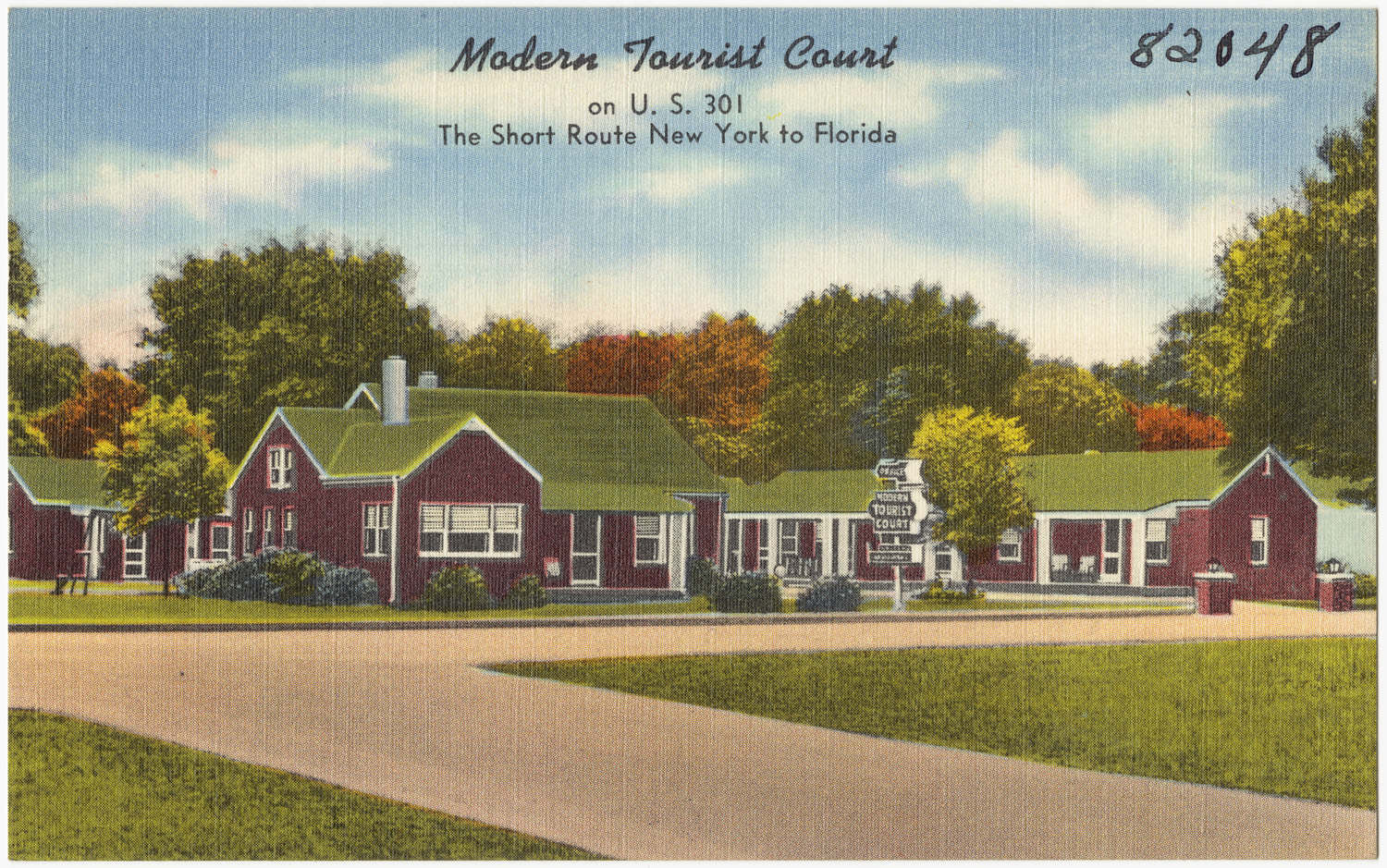
Advertised as "The Short Route New York to Florida" on a motel postcard c.1940s

In the late 1940s, US 301 was extended again, south all the way to Tampa, Florida. In South Carolina it ran along US 15 southwest to Santee, South Carolina and replaced SC 4 west to Orangeburg, South Carolina. From Orangeburg, US 301 ran southwest with US 601 to Bamberg, South Carolina, replaced SC 33 to Ulmer, South Carolina, replaced SC 508 to Allendale, South Carolina, and replaced SC 73 to the Georgia state line. In Georgia, US 301 was marked along SR 73 to Glennville, Georgia, SR 23 to Folkston, and SR 4 to the border with Florida, numbers that it still has today. In Florida it ran along SR 15 to Callahan, SR 200 to Ocala, SR 25/SR 500 to Belleview, SR 35 to Dade City, SR 39 to Zephyrhills, and State Road 41 to Tampa, Florida. As with Georgia, these State Road numbers still exist.

The final extension to the south was made in the early 1950s. US 301 was realigned to turn east on U.S. Route 92/SR 600 in northern Tampa and south on SR 43; SR 43 was later extended north to meet SR 41 at Thonotosassa. This was done at the same time as US 541 was eliminated and US 41 was moved onto the former US 541 south of Tampa; US 301 ran along what had been US 41. This extension took US 301 south to Palmetto along SR 43/former US 41, south on SR 45/US 41 over the Manatee River into Bradenton, Florida (replaced 1957 by a new bridge to the east on SR 55), and south on SR 683 to end at SR 45/US 41 in Sarasota.

In 1960, US 301 was extended to its greatest extent, Sarasota to Farnhurst. The part from near Bowie north to Baltimore reverted to MD 3, and US 301 was extended east along US 50 from near Bowie over the Chesapeake Bay Bridge to Queenstown. There it split to the northeast, replacing MD 71 to the Delaware state line. In Delaware, it continued concurrent with DE 71 to Middletown. There it split into a one-way pair on two two-way roads. US 301 northbound turned east at Middletown along DE 299, then running north on US 13 to its end at Farnhurst at I-295 - the Delaware Memorial Bridge approach. Southbound US 301 began at the same place, but only used US 13 to the DE 71 junction near Red Lion. From there it followed DE 71 all the way to Maryland, rejoining northbound at Middletown. In the early 1970s, the northbound alignment was modified, continuing north on Middletown with DE 71 across the Chesapeake and Delaware Canal on the Summit Bridge. After crossing the canal it continued north on DE 896 to Glasgow, where it turned east with US 40 to its merge with US 13 at State Road. In the mid-1980s, both directions were moved to run east from Mount Pleasant to US 13. Then in 1992, AASHTO approved relocating both directions to the path northbound had followed, joining US 40 at Glasgow. Signage currently now indicates that US 301 ends there, but on November 14, 2006, the Delaware Department of Transportation (DelDOT) announced that a new four-lane US 301 bypass will be built. The bypass, which had been proposed since the 1950s, would go west of Middletown, alleviating traffic conditions in state's fourth most populous town, and then travel in a northeasterly direction, intersecting the current DE 896 near Boyds Corner and then terminate at DE 1 near the highway's Biddles Corner toll plaza. A spur route, also following the old 1960s highway route, will connect US 301 with the four-lane Summit Bridge just south of Glasgow. When built, the road, like Delaware Route 1 and I-95, will charge a toll to cover the costs of building the new bypass, which is heavily used by trucks between Philadelphia and the Washington, D.C. metro areas. This bypass opened to traffic on January 10, 2019.

According to one source, US 301 had been known as "Tobacco Trail" prior to its renaming in 1960 to "The Miss Universe Highway".

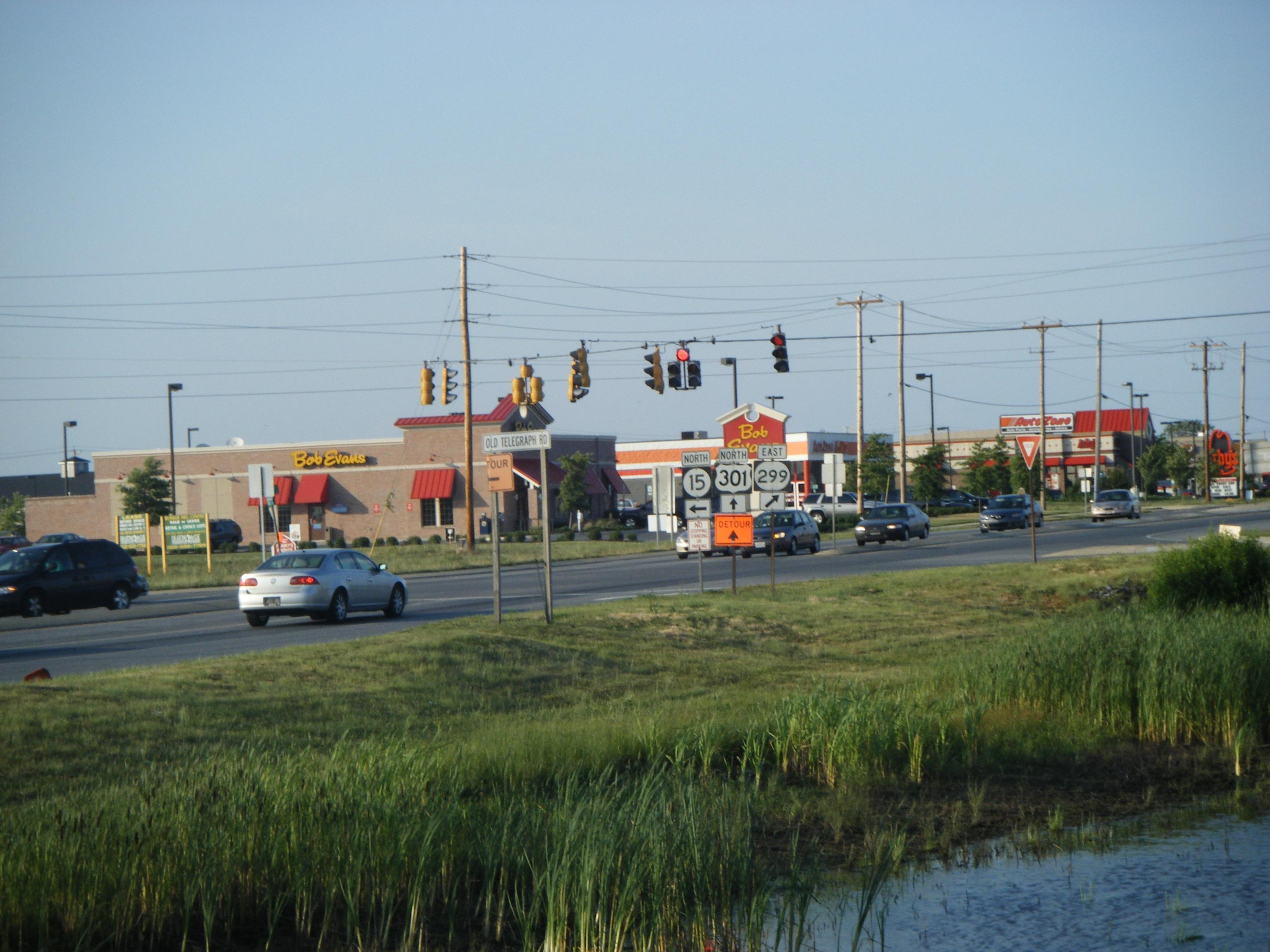
US 301 in Middletown at northern terminus of concurrency with DE 15 and DE 299 in 2008. The route was moved to a new toll road alignment through Delaware in 2019.

Prior to 2019, US 301 in Delaware started at the intersection of U.S. 40 and Delaware Route 896 in Glasgow. The highway was cosigned with DE 896, picking up Delaware Route 71 only three miles south of U.S. 40. Running parallel to US 13 and Delaware Route 1, the highway crossed the Chesapeake and Delaware Canal on the four-lane Summit Bridge. At Mount Pleasant, DE 896 headed east to intersect U.S. 13 at Boyd's Corner, while DE 71 continued to be cosigned with U.S. 301 until the road reached Middletown. U.S. 301 continued alone until it picked up two other roads, Delaware Route 15 and Delaware Route 299, which followed the highway to near the Maryland state line. On November 14, 2006, DelDOT announced that a new four-lane bypass around Middletown will reroute US 301 west of Middletown, with the road directly connecting to DE 1 in Biddles Corner. This bypass opened to traffic on January 10, 2019.

=== U.S. Route 217 ===
U.S. Route 217
- Location: Pee Dee, SC–Wilson, NC
- Length: 151.1 mi (243.2 km)
- Existed: 1926–1932

U.S. Route 217 (US 217) was an original US highway, established in 1926. It traversed from US 17, in Pee Dee, South Carolina, to US 17-1/NC 40, south of Wilson, North Carolina. Its routing connected the cities of Dillon, Lumberton, Fayetteville, Dunn, and Smithfield. In 1932, the entire route was renumbered as part of US 301.

== Major intersections ==
Florida
US 41 in Sarasota
US 41 on the Bradenton–West Samoset city line. The highways travel concurrently to Palmetto.
I-75 in Ellenton
I-75 in Palm River-Clair Mel
US 92 in East Lake-Orient Park
US 98 south of Dade City. The highways travel concurrently to Lacoochee.
US 27 / US 441 in Belleview. US 27/US 301 travels concurrently to Ocala. US 301/US 441 travels concurrently to southeast of Reddick.
I-10 south-southwest of Baldwin
US 90 in Baldwin. The highways travel concurrently through Baldwin.
US 1 / US 23 in Callahan. The highways travel concurrently to Homeland, Georgia.
Georgia
US 82 in Nahunta
US 25 / US 341 in Jesup. US 25/US 301 travels concurrently to Statesboro.
US 84 in Jesup. The highways travel concurrently to Ludowici.
US 280 in Claxton
I-16 south-southeast of Register
US 25 / US 80 in Statesboro
South Carolina
US 278 in Allendale. The highways travel concurrently through Allendale.
US 321 in Ulmer. The highways travel concurrently to northeast of Ulmer.
US 601 in Bamberg. The highways travel concurrently to Orangeburg.
US 78 in Bamberg
US 21 / US 178 in Orangeburg
I-26 southeast of Wilkinson Heights
US 176 south-southwest of Elloree
US 15 south-southwest of Santee. The highways travel concurrently to Summerton.
I-95 south-southeast of Santee. The highways travel concurrently to south-southwest of Summerton.
I-95 southwest of Manning
US 521 in Manning. The highways travel concurrently to north-northeast of Manning.
US 378 in Turbeville. The highways travel concurrently through Turbeville.
US 52 in Effingham. The highways travel concurrently to Florence.
US 76 east of Florence. The highways travel concurrently to Pee Dee.
US 501 south of Latta. The highways travel concurrently to Rowland, North Carolina.
South Carolina–North Carolina
I-95 at the South Carolina–North Carolina state line at South of the Border
North Carolina
I-95 east of Raynham. The highways travel concurrently to Lumberton.
I-74 / US 74 southwest of Lumberton
I-95 north of Lumberton
I-95 north of St. Pauls
US 421 in Dunn
I-95 / US 701 northeast of Four Oaks
US 70 in Selma
I-95 southwest of Kenly
I-795 south-southwest of Wilson
US 117 south-southwest of Wilson
I-587 / US 264 south-southwest of Wilson
US 64 in Rocky Mount
US 158 in Weldon. The highways travel concurrently to Garysburg.
Virginia
US 58 in Emporia
I-95 south of Jarratt
I-95 in Carson
I-95 in Templeton
I-95 south-southeast of Petersburg
I-95 / US 460 in Petersburg
US 1 in Petersburg. The highways travel concurrently to Richmond.
US 360 in Richmond
US 60 in Richmond
US 250 in Richmond
I-64 / I-95 in Richmond
I-95 in Chamberlayne
I-295 in Mechanicsville
US 17 in Port Royal Cross Roads
Maryland
I-595 / US 50 in Bowie. I-595/US 301 shares a hidden concurrency to Parole. US 50/US 301 travels concurrently to Queenstown.
I-97 in Parole
Delaware
DE 1 in Biddles Corner

== Special routes ==
There are currently eight active special routes along US 301:

- US 301 Truck – Dade City, Florida
- US 301 Alternate - Starke, FL
- US 301 Alternate - Baldwin, FL
- US 301 Bypass – Statesboro, Georgia
- US 301 Business – Rocky Mount, North Carolina
- US 301 Business – Halifax, North Carolina
- US 301 Alternate – Petersburg, Virginia
- US 301 Business – Bowling Green, Virginia

== See also ==
Browse numbered routes
← SR 300	FL	→ SR 312
← SR 300	GA	→ SR 301
← SC 300	SC	→ SC 302
← NC 294	NC	→ NC 304
← SR 300	VA	→ SR 302
← MD 300	MD	→ MD 301
← DE 300	DE	→ DE 404
