= St. Georges Bridge (Delaware) =

Steel tied arch bridge in St. Georges, Delaware

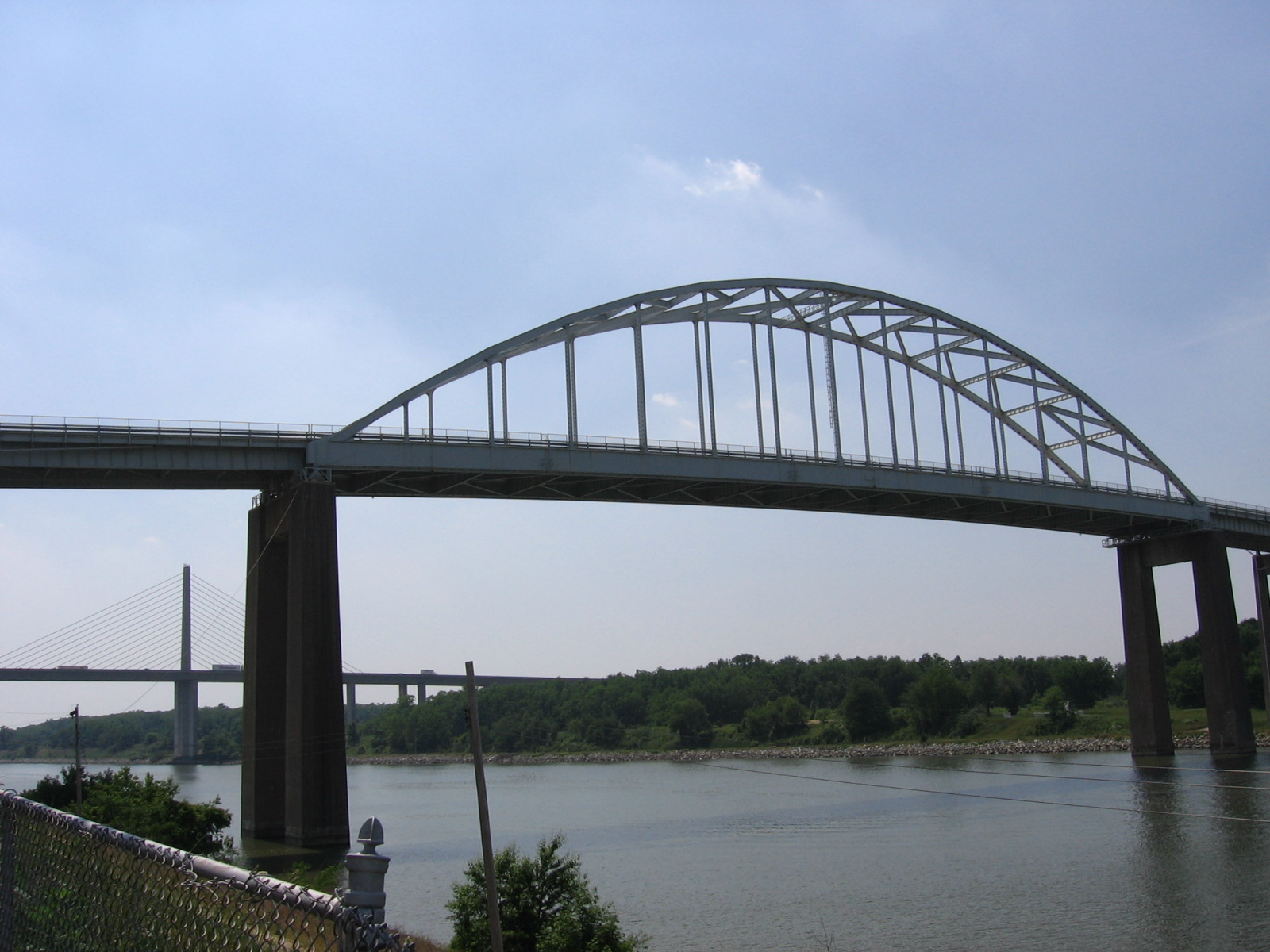
- Coordinates: 39.552568°N 75.651051°W
- Carries: US 13 (2 traffic lanes, 2 bike lanes)
- Crosses: Chesapeake & Delaware Canal
- Locale: St. Georges, Delaware
- Maintained by: U.S. Army Corps of Engineers

Characteristics
- Design: Tied arch bridge
- Total length: 4,209 feet (1,283 m)
- Width: approx. 28 feet (8.5 m)
- Longest span: 450 feet (140 m)
- Clearance below: 135 feet (41 m)

History
- Opened: 1942

Location
- Interactive map of St. Georges Bridge

The St. Georges Bridge is a steel tied arch bridge that carries U.S. Route 13 (US 13) across the Chesapeake & Delaware Canal in St. Georges, Delaware. Built by the U.S. Army Corps of Engineers and opened in 1942 as a high-level crossing, the bridge was the first four-lane, high-level crossing to span the canal. It replaced a previous vertical lift bridge which was damaged when a German merchant ship collided with it.

== History and near replacement ==
On January 10, 1939, the S.S. Waukegan struck and destroyed the original St. Georges Bridge, killing the bridge tender. The replacement steel tied arch bridge over the canal opened on January 31, 1942. This bridge was the first four-lane crossing of the Chesapeake and Delaware Canal.

Prior to the opening of the paralleling Delaware Route 1 turnpike and the Chesapeake & Delaware Canal Bridge in 1995 (since renamed the Senator William V. Roth Jr. Bridge), the bridge was the main north–south crossing in Delaware, as such, suffered from a deteriorating concrete deck and support beams that forced both the Delaware Department of Transportation (DelDOT) and the Army Corps of Engineers to place a weight restriction and forced all through truck traffic onto the paralleling Summit Bridge (then US 301, now DE 71/DE 896), seven miles (11 km) to the west. The late U.S. Senator Bill Roth, who saw the need for a new crossing, was a main proponent in securing federal funding for the new C&D Canal Bridge.

After the opening of the paralleling C&D Canal Bridge, the Army Corps of Engineers closed the St. Georges Bridge in anticipation of demolishing the structure. Local opposition arose, especially from residents in St. Georges, whose town spans both sides of the canal; these residents would have had to travel out of their way and pay an additional toll to go from one half of the town to the other.

Instead of tearing down the bridge, the Army Corps of Engineers, using data issued from the Delaware Department of Transportation and the U.S. Census Bureau, rehabilitated the bridge between 1998 and 2001. A new concrete deck was constructed, and deteriorated beams and joints were replaced. The lead-based paint on the bridge was removed and replaced with a lead-free primer and salt-resistant enamel (the C&D Canal connects two rias, having from time to time been inundated with brackish water during dry spells), and the bridge was reopened to local traffic.

In September 2018, the St. Georges bridge was again closed for repairs, causing US 13 traffic to be detoured over the nearby Roth Bridge. The repairs were complete within four months of closing, reopening during the week of January 27, 2019.

As a result of the need to maintain quick access to both U.S. 13 and the Del. Rt. 1 Turnpike, both the St. Georges Bridge and the C&D Canal Bridge have no tolls (the Army Corps of Engineers allowed DelDOT to build a South St. Georges interchange to U.S. 13 between the bridge and the Biddles Corner toll facility, with provisions to build another exit north of the bridge if needed). Prior to 1992, the St. Georges Bridge also served as the crossing for U.S. Route 301, but this was shifted that year to the Summit Bridge further west. After construction of a new toll freeway that opened on January 10, 2019, US 301 uses neither bridge, and terminates at DE 1 just north of the Biddles Corner tollbooths. Also during this time, the northbound free access to the bridge was moved 1 mile south to the intersection of US-13 and Port Penn Road at the Biddles Corner tollbooth. The new ramp passes between the tollbooths and the plaza building (no tolls collected) and rises to merge briefly onto US-301 north just before its end at DE-1. This was done to accommodate the US-301 expressway. The southbound free exit remains in its original location exiting to Lorewood Grove Road under the bridge.

=== Lead paint incident ===
Lead paint exposure created a public health risk in 2000 during the sandblasting and repainting of St. George's Bridge over the C&D Canal. The Department of Public Health (DPH) and the Department of Natural Resources and Environmental Control (DNREC) took emergency actions after wind blew lead paint chips beyond the reach of a protective tarp and onto the surrounding residential community. DPH Officials began going door to door to warn residents about lead paint chipping from St. George's Bridge in February 2000, handing out information about the dangers of lead, a guide on foods that naturally fight lead poisoning, and providing residents with information on free blood testing. DNREC filed an enforcement action against the US Army Corps of Engineers in March 2000. DNREC required the USACE to 1) employ “state of the art technology” to contain falling paint chips, 2) set up a hotline for residents to report falling chips, 3) clean up fallen paint chips, 4) decontaminate soil tainted by fallen paint chips, and 5) conduct regular inspections around the bridge for any additional fallen paint chips. In August 2000 DNREC called on USACE to remove the top foot of soil from contaminated areas in 37 yards that had lead levels of 400 or more parts per million.

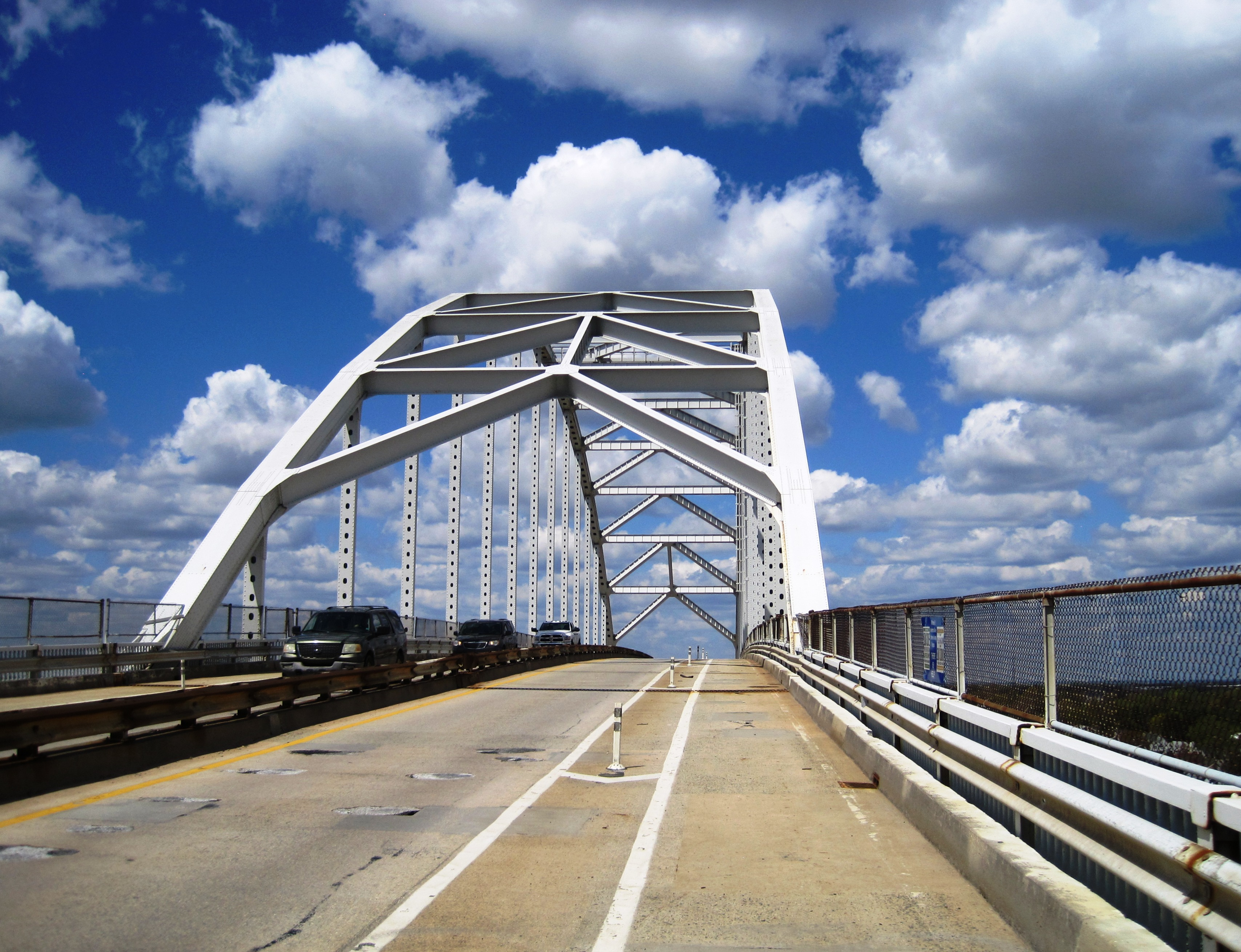
Bridge deck showing the outer lane converted to a protected bike lane

== See also ==
- List of crossings of the Chesapeake & Delaware Canal
