= A. Eliason House =

Historic house in Delaware, US

- U.S. National Register of Historic Places
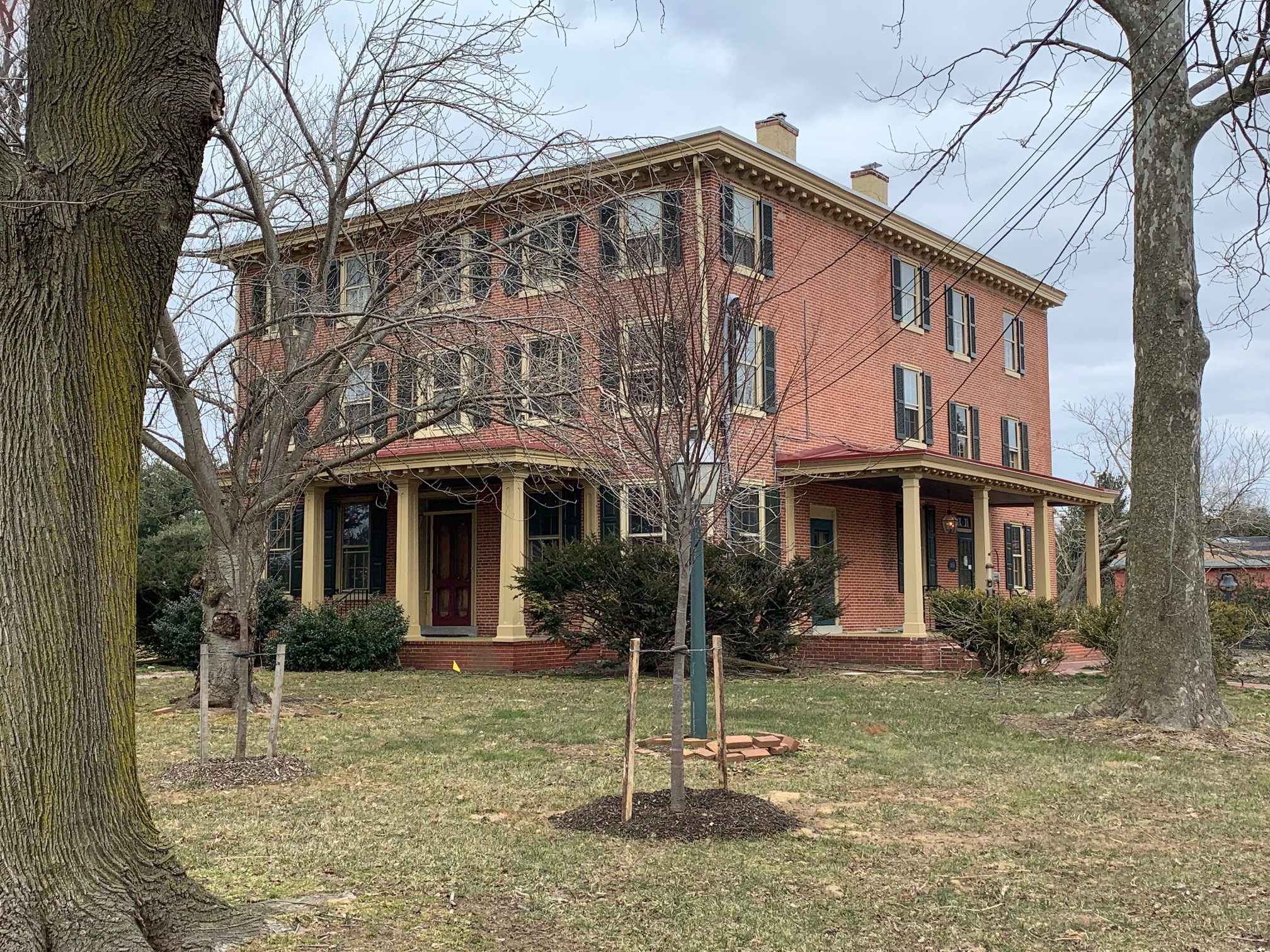

- Location within Delaware Location within the United States
- Location: 4353 Summit Bridge Road; Mt. Pleasant, Delaware
- Coordinates: 39.518520°N 75.713783°W
- Area: 7 acres (2.8 ha)
- Built: c. 1850
- Architectural style: Greek Revival, Late Victorian, Federal
- MPS: Rebuilding St. Georges Hundred 1850-1880 TR
- NRHP reference No.: 85002110
- Added to NRHP: September 13, 1985

A. Eliason House is a historic home located at Mt. Pleasant in New Castle County, Delaware, United States. It was built about 1850, and is a three-story, five-bay, brick dwelling with a shallow hipped roof. It has a center passage plan and features two one-story, tetra-style porches. Also on the property are a contributing two-story brick combination carriage house and storage loft, an earthfast cartshed, a braced frame granary containing corn cribs, and a brick stable.

It was listed on the National Register of Historic Places in 1985.
