= Summit Bridge, Delaware =

Unincorporated community in Delaware, United States

Summit Bridge, Delaware Summit
- Unincorporated community
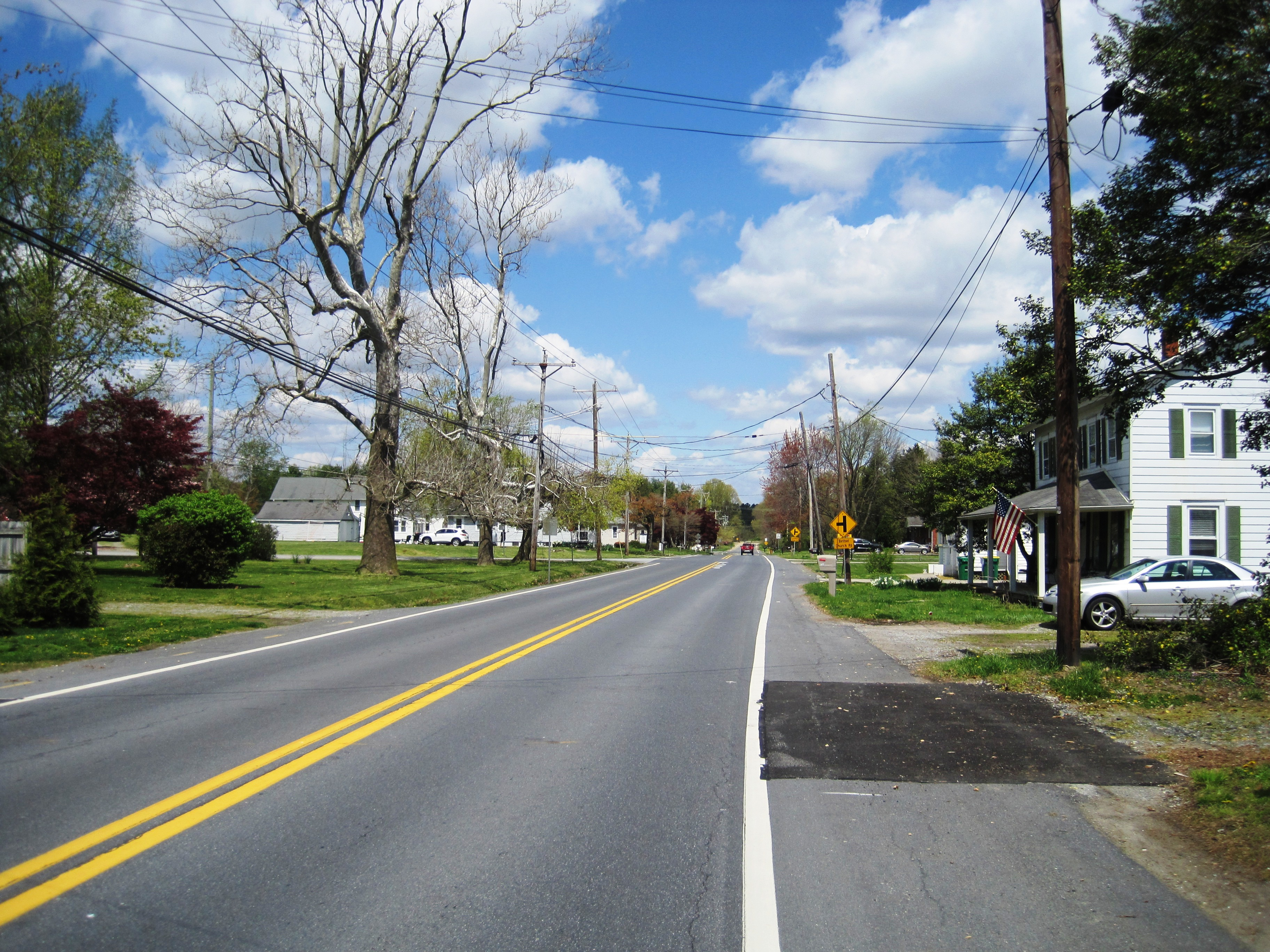
- Community as shown along Old Summit Bridge Road in April 2021

- Location within Delaware Location within the United States
- Coordinates: 39°32′7″N 75°43′34″W
- Country: United States
- State: Delaware
- County: New Castle
- Elevation: 69 ft (21 m)
- Time zone: UTC-5 (Eastern (EST))
  - Summer (DST): UTC-4 (EDT)
- Area code: 302
- GNIS feature ID: 214707

Summit Bridge (or simply Summit) is an unincorporated community in New Castle County, Delaware, United States. Summit Bridge is home to Summit Airport, located five miles north of the central business district of Middletown. Summit Bridge is located south of the Summit Bridge over the Chesapeake and Delaware Canal.
