= Mount Pleasant, Delaware =

Unincorporated community in Delaware, United States

- Unincorporated community
- Location within Delaware Location within the United States
- Coordinates: 39°30′39″N 75°42′41″W
- Country: United States
- State: Delaware
- County: New Castle
- Elevation: 69 ft (21 m)
- Time zone: UTC-5 (Eastern (EST))
  - Summer (DST): UTC-4 (EDT)
- Area code: 302
- GNIS feature ID: 214349

Mount Pleasant is an unincorporated community located largely in St. George's Hundred, Delaware, United States. Mount Pleasant is located at the intersection of Delaware routes 71 and 896, north of Middletown. The A. Eliason House, north of town, is listed on the National Register of Historic Places.
