= Boyds Corner, Delaware =

Unincorporated community in Delaware, United States

- Unincorporated community
- Location within Delaware Location within the United States
- Coordinates: 39°30′0″N 75°38′57″W
- Country: United States
- State: Delaware
- County: New Castle
- Elevation: 56 ft (17 m)
- Time zone: UTC-5 (Eastern (EST))
  - Summer (DST): UTC-4 (EDT)
- Area code: 302
- GNIS feature ID: 216047

Boyds Corner is an unincorporated community in New Castle County, Delaware, United States. Boyds Corner is located at the intersection of U.S. Route 13 and Delaware Route 896, north of Odessa.
