= Summit Bridge =

Bridge in Delaware, United States

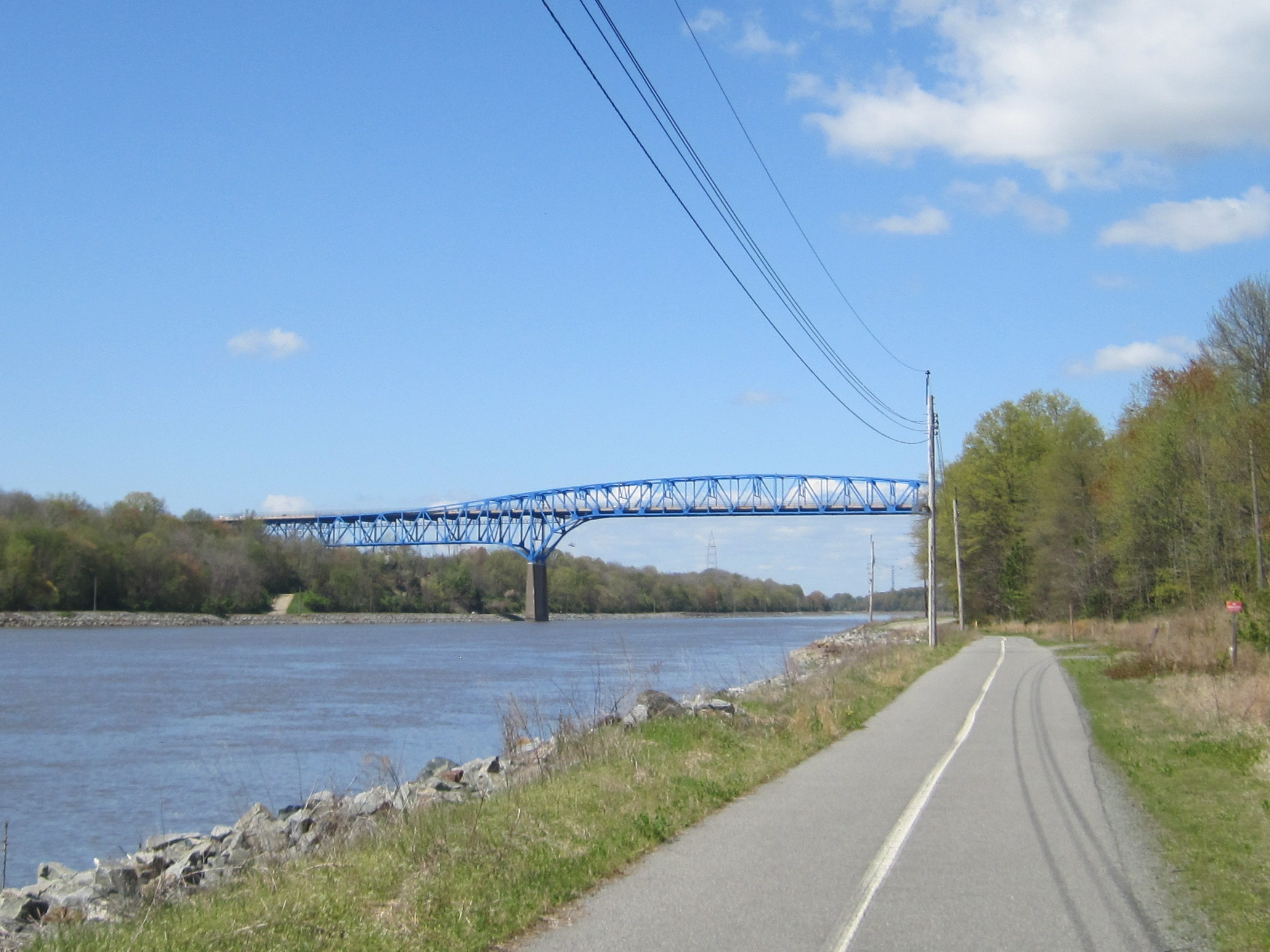
- View of the bridge in April 2021
- Coordinates: 39.540786°N 75.738544°W
- Carries: 4 lanes of DE 71 / DE 896 / Bike Route 1
- Crosses: Chesapeake & Delaware Canal
- Locale: Summit Bridge, Delaware
- Maintained by: U.S. Army Corps of Engineers

Characteristics
- Design: Cantilever truss bridge
- Clearance above: 135'

History
- Opened: January 9, 1960

Location
- Interactive map of Summit Bridge

The Summit Bridge carries Delaware Routes 71 and 896 across the Chesapeake & Delaware Canal. The bridge also carries Delaware Bicycle Route 1, a bicycle route that spans the length of the state of Delaware, across the canal. The Summit Bridge opened to traffic on January 9, 1960, replacing a lift bridge. Before the bridge opened to traffic, a dedication ceremony was held, with U.S. Senator J. Allen Frear Jr. in attendance. The Summit Bridge was the second four-lane high-level crossing in Delaware and was designed to carry an eventual US 301 freeway, however that planned freeway was never built on the alignment utilizing the Summit Bridge. US 301 did use the bridge when it was routed along surface roads from 1961 to 2019, at which time it was rerouted onto a new toll freeway. The current bridge replaces a former swing span structure that was demolished when the U.S. Army Corps of Engineers rerouted the canal to a new sea-level channel south of Lums Pond State Park. A construction project on the approaches to the bridge was completed in Fall of 2012.

== See also ==
- List of crossings of the Chesapeake & Delaware Canal
