= Senator William V. Roth Jr. Bridge =

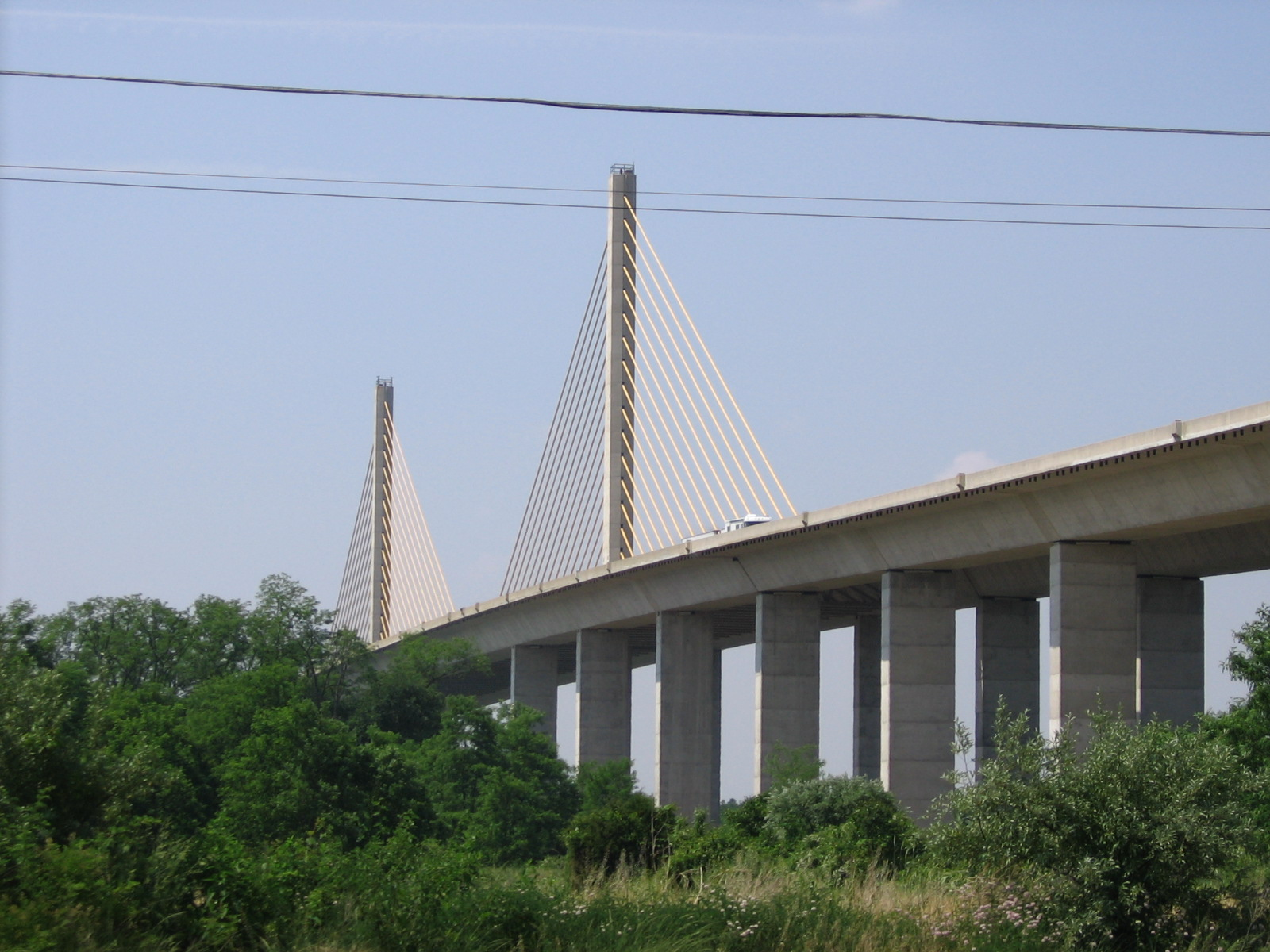
- Coordinates: 39.549722°N 75.656501°W
- Carries: 6 lanes of DE 1
- Crosses: Chesapeake & Delaware Canal
- Locale: St. Georges, Delaware
- Other name(s): Chesapeake & Delaware Canal Bridge, New St. Georges Bridge
- Maintained by: U.S. Army Corps of Engineers

Characteristics
- Design: Cable-stayed bridge
- Total length: 4,650 feet (1,417 m)
- Width: 127 feet (39 m)
- Longest span: 750 feet (229 m)
- Clearance below: 138 feet (42.1 m)

History
- Construction start: 1991
- Construction end: 1994
- Opened: December 23, 1995

Location
- Interactive map of Senator William V. Roth Jr. Bridge

The Senator William V. Roth Jr. Bridge (originally the Chesapeake & Delaware Canal Bridge and also referred to as the Roth Bridge) is a concrete and steel cable-stayed bridge that spans the Chesapeake & Delaware Canal near St. Georges, Delaware. The bridge is located near a tolled section of Delaware Route 1 that runs parallel to the St. Georges Bridge carrying U.S. Route 13. In November 2006, the bridge was named after U.S. Senator William V. Roth Jr., who not only lent his name to the Roth IRA, but was instrumental in securing federal funding to build the bridge. It is owned and operated by the U.S. Army Corps of Engineers and does not carry a toll, despite the location of a nearby toll plaza.

== History ==
Plans for a new bridge began in the 1980s when former Governor Michael N. Castle investigated a new canal crossing to replace the aging St. Georges Bridge. The bridge plans later became incorporated into the "Relief Route" plans for an upgraded US 13 as a toll freeway, as the narrower surface roads were over-capacity with north-south traffic. The project took about a decade to overcome various political and social obstacles, and construction began in 1992 on the new freeway and bridge. The freeway north of the bridge from Tybouts Corner to Christiana was originally designated as a southward extension of Delaware Route 7. It was redesignated as a northward extension of Delaware Route 1 once the bridge was completed on December 9, 1995, concurrent with the opening of the Relief Route freeway from Tybouts Corner to Biddles Corner.

After its opening in 1995, the Corps of Engineers rerouted US 13 onto the new bridge. The old St. Georges Bridge was scheduled to be demolished, however local opposition saved the bridge and it was rehabilitated with new lead-free paint, new roadway deck, and several joint and structural repairs that allows heavier vehicles to use it. After the multi-year rehabilitation project, which lasted from 1998–2001, US 13 was returned to the St. Georges Bridge. Though the entire Relief Route was planned as a toll road, it was later agreed to install the tollbooths past the US 13 exit south of the canal, so as to keep both crossings toll free.

In December 2018, US 13 was temporarily detoured over the Roth Bridge when the St. Georges Bridge was closed for repairs. The repairs are expected to be complete within four months of closing, for a March 2019 reopening.

== Physical description ==
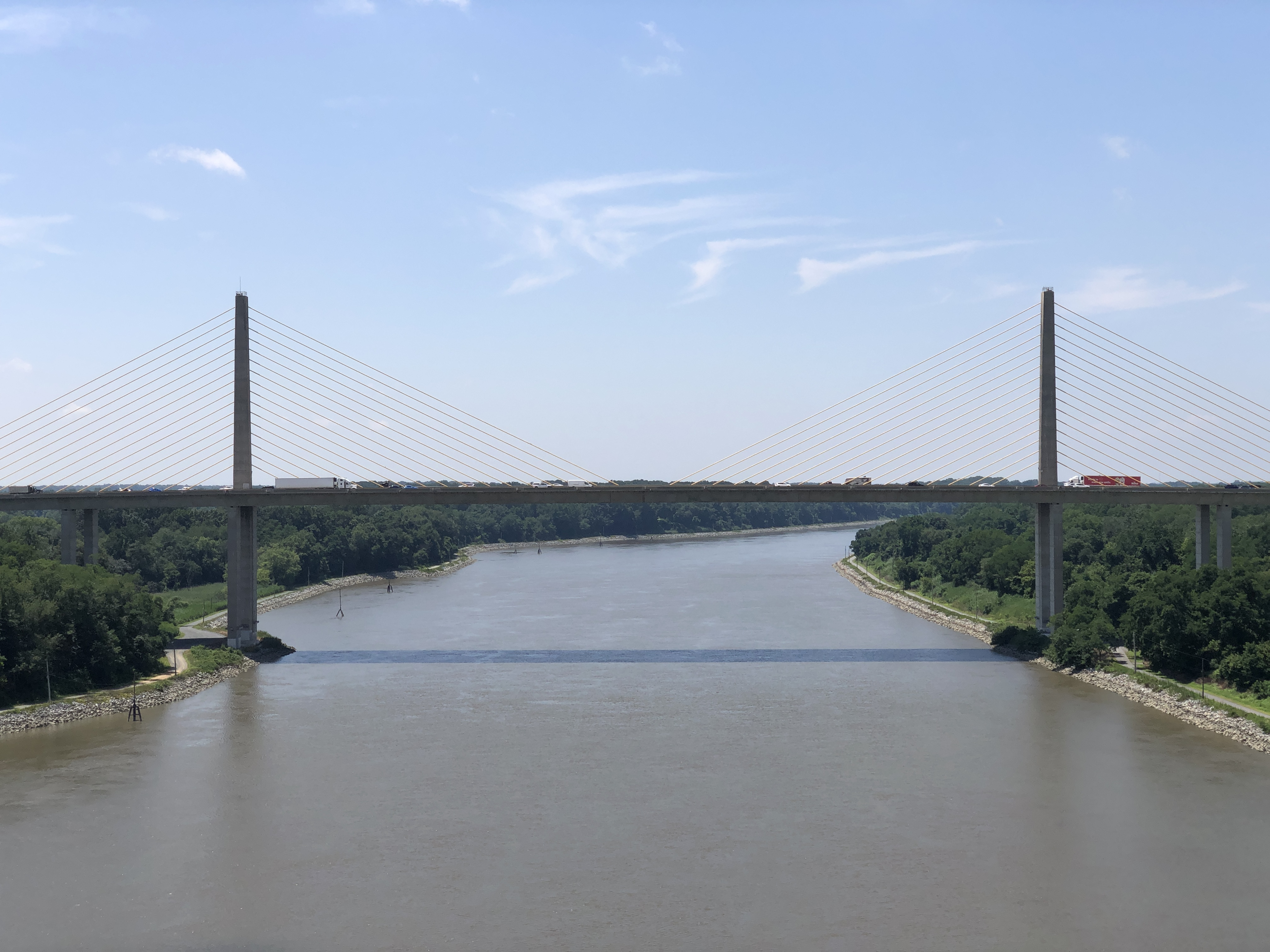
Senator William V. Roth Jr. Bridge viewed from the St. Georges Bridge

The Senator William V. Roth Jr. Bridge, the first cable-stayed bridge of its type in the Philadelphia metropolitan area (all previous Delaware River or C & D Canal bridges are either suspension, cantilever, or simple truss designs), is also the first pre-cast concrete bridge to be built in the United States. Modeled after that of the Sunshine Skyway Bridge in St. Petersburg, Florida, the bridge incorporates many features not found on the other canal bridges:

- Fixed high-level crossing, a 100 feet (30 m) clearance like that of the other Canal highway crossings.
- 750 feet (229 m) center span, with the major anchorages out of the water (thus preventing a catastrophic collision similar to the old Sunshine Skyway Bridge and previous C & D Canal bridges)
- Six travel lanes, with the option of restriping to eight
- Pull-off emergency shoulders on both sides (under the current striping arrangement)
- Roadway lighting – they were removed in 2003 at the requests of canal pilots and replaced with low-voltage low-pressure sodium floodlights that illuminate the main support anchors
- 65-mph speed limit
- Separate approach spans, only joining at the anchorages of the cables

The bridge also incorporates a 3% climbing grade, a feature lacked on the nearby St. Georges Bridge. The bridge, built between 1991 and 1994, utilized pre-cast concrete segments that were made in Cape Charles, Virginia, and transported by barge until it reached the job site. Once at the site, the segments were fitted into place like that of a jigsaw puzzle.

== Awards ==
- 1995: Harry H. Edwards Award from the Precast Concrete Institute

== See also ==
- List of crossings of the Chesapeake & Delaware Canal
- Indian River Inlet Bridge
