= Wicomico Truth and Reconciliation Initiative =

Racial justice organization

The Wicomico Truth and Reconciliation Initiative (WTRI) is a movement in Wicomico County, Maryland, United States, to address the community's history of white supremacy through education and advocacy. The organization was formed in 2018 by James Yamakawa and Amber Green.

== Activities ==
=== Early activities ===
WTRI drew upon Yamakawa and Green's early racial justice organizing work. This included a soil ceremony to honor the three lynching victims in Wicomico County, Maryland. Each victim had their own jar consisting of the soil from the lynching site. These jars of soil can be found on display at the Legacy Museum in Montgomery, Alabama. There are also jars of the same soil on display at the Chipman Cultural Center in Salisbury, Maryland.

In 2016, Yamakawa led a candlelight vigil for lynching victim Matthew Williams. He led a crowd down the route in the city of Salisbury where Williams was dragged and ultimately hung to his death. The candles were placed in the spot where Williams was hung. In 2019, WTRI held a candlelight vigil to honor the last known lynching victim in Salisbury. The man's identity was never discovered and remains as "Unknown". The WTRI also worked together to organize a candlelight vigil in 2020 for victims of racial terror.

=== Removal of Winder sign ===
In 1965, the city of Salisbury installed a sign dedicated to the Confederate general John H. Winder on the Wicomico County Courthouse lawn. Winder ran a Confederate prison system during the American Civil War in which more than 13,000 Union soldiers died in one camp alone. This sign stood within feet of the site where Matthew Williams was lynched in 1931. Yamakawa of the WTRI worked in a grassroots campaign to advocate for the removal of this sign. WTRI organized a local chapter of the national group Showing Up for Racial Justice, wrote letters to the editor of the local paper and wrote a petition calling for the sign's removal, which was supported by the then-Salisbury mayor, Jake Day. In June 2020, county officials formally removed the sign.

=== Placement of historical lynching marker ===
WTRI was formed to support the creation of a memorial for three lynching victims in Wicomico County. On 22 May 2021, this purpose was achieved. People gathered on the Wicomico County Courthouse lawn to watch the unveiling of the historical marker. WTRI partnered the Equal Justice Initiative and other local organizations to plan events surrounding this unveiling.

=== Formation of steering council ===
In August 2021, WTRI vocalized its plans to form a steering council to educate the community on the history of racism in Wicomico County and working towards healing. These plans have been put into action and are currently still in the beginning stages of the council's development.

=== Call on the City of Salisbury to issue apology ===
Calls for the city to apologize were started once its government offices were moved to the old firehouse, which is from where the rope that was used in the lynching of Matthew Williams came. Frederick Grier Jr., Salisbury's fire chief at the time, provided the rope. The WTRI and the Wicomico County NAACP drafted a resolution for the city to foster. This resolution acted as an apology to the descendants of both Matthew Williams and Garfield King, who were both lynching victims of the City of Salisbury. The city did not adopt the resolution, instead wanting to create its own apology as this is more sincere in the eyes of the council president, April Jackson. Both WTRI and the Wicomico County NAACP were glad the city wanted to work with them towards an apology for the lynching victims' descendants and Salisbury's Black community. WTRI organizer Yamakawa acknowledged that those involved in the lynchings were no longer alive, but an apology was still needed from those who are a part of the same institutions today.
