= Cecil County, Maryland =

County in the United States

- County
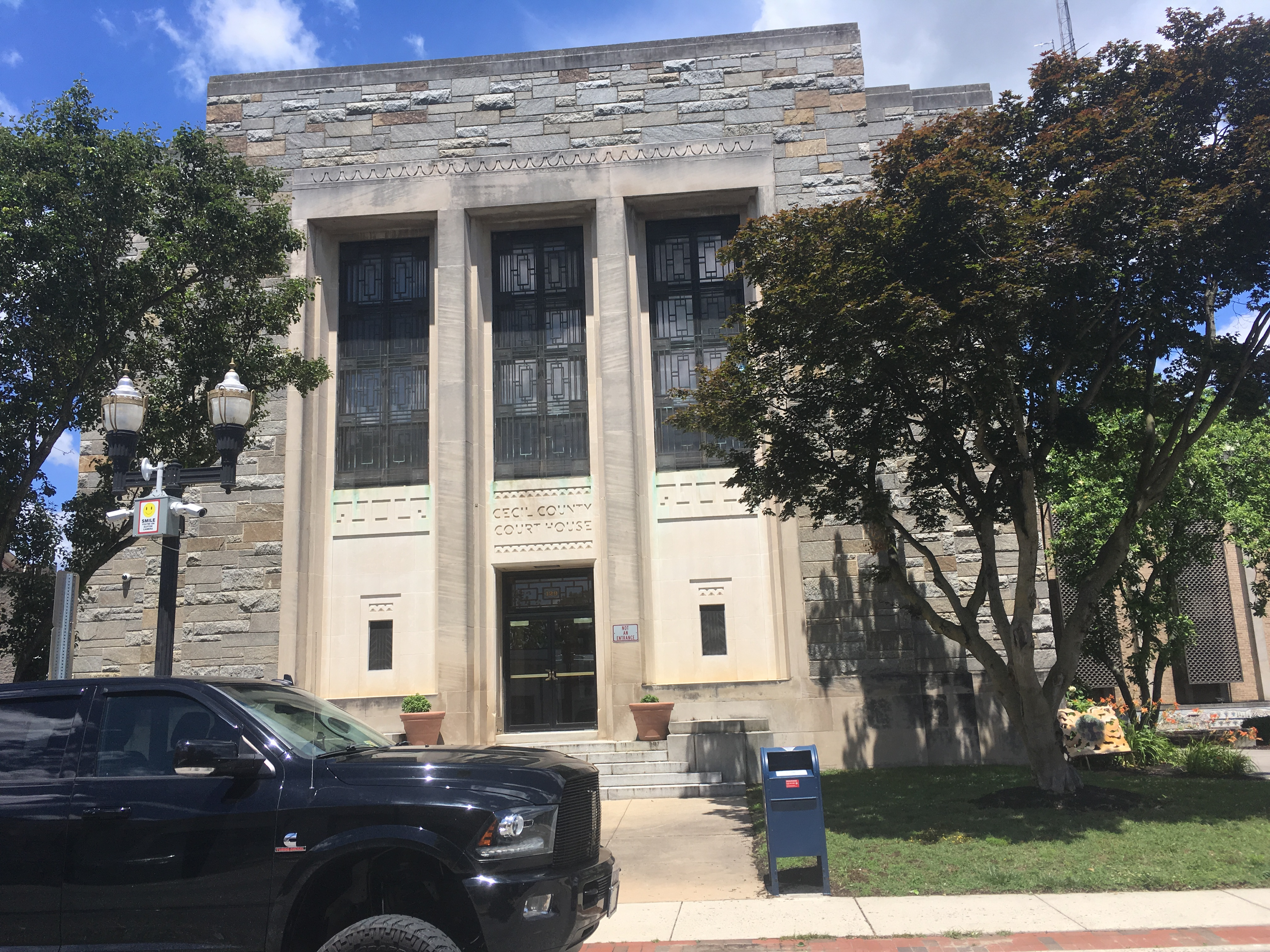
- Cecil County Circuit Courthouse in Elkton

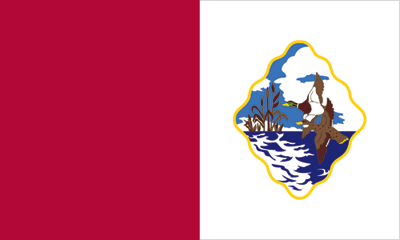
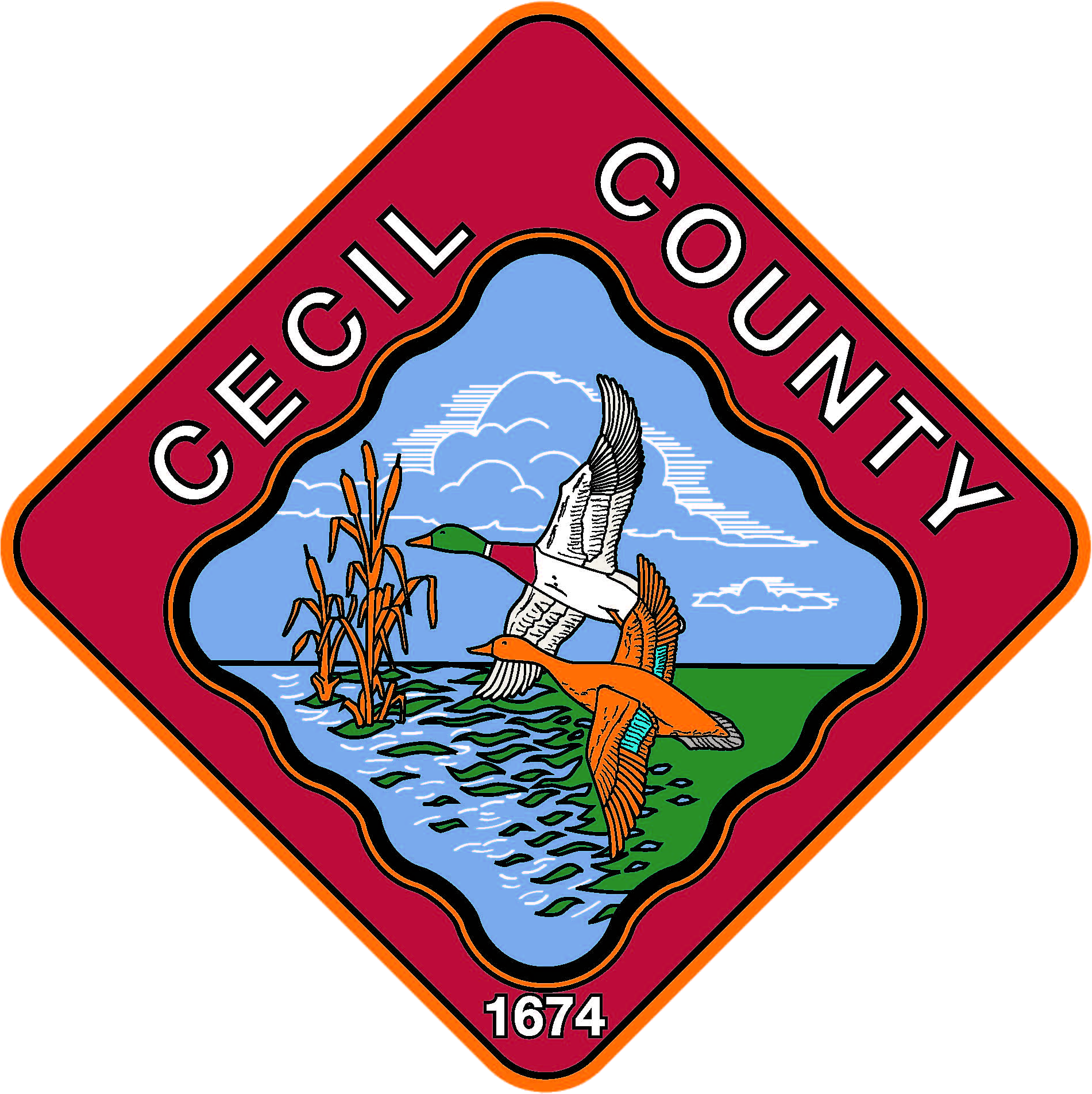
- Flag Seal

- Location within the U.S. state of Maryland
- Coordinates: 39°34′N 75°57′W
- Country: United States
- State: Maryland
- Founded: June 6, 1674
- Named for: Cecil Calvert
- Seat: Elkton
- Largest town: Elkton

Area
  - Total: 418 sq mi (1,080 km^{2})
  - Land: 346 sq mi (900 km^{2})
  - Water: 72 sq mi (190 km^{2}) 17%

Population (2020)
  - Total: 103,725
  - Estimate (2025): 107,131 ▲
  - Density: 300/sq mi (116/km^{2})
- Time zone: UTC−5 (Eastern)
  - Summer (DST): UTC−4 (EDT)
- Congressional district: 1st
- Website: www.cecilcountymd.gov

Cecil County is located in the U.S. state of Maryland at the northeastern corner of the state, bordering both Pennsylvania and Delaware. As of the 2020 United States census, the population was 103,725. The county seat is Elkton. The county is part of the Mid-Eastern Shore region of the state.

The county was named for Cecil Calvert, 2nd Baron Baltimore (1605–1675), the first Proprietary Governor of the Province (colony) of Maryland. With the eastern part of the county closer to Philadelphia than Baltimore, it is part of the Philadelphia metropolitan area. The county is located in Wilmington's Radio Market and Baltimore's Designated Market Area.

== History ==
=== Colonial era ===
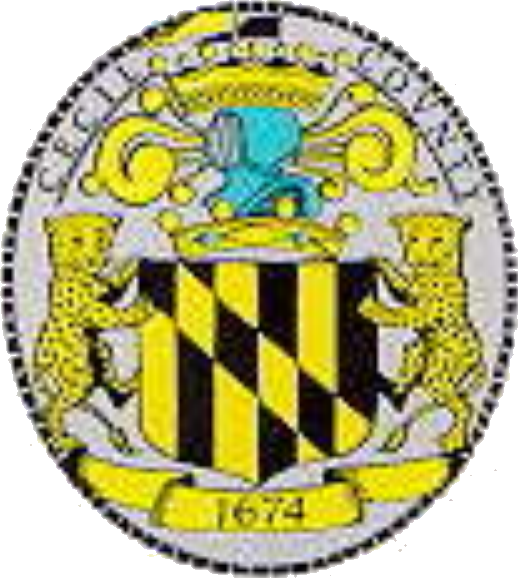
Former county seal, used from the 17th century to the 20th century

The area now known as Cecil County was an important trading center long before the county's official organization in 1674 by proclamation of Lord Baltimore. It had previously been a northeastern part of a much larger Baltimore County, Maryland, in the northeastern portion of the Province. This had included present-day Baltimore and Baltimore County, and Harford, Carroll, eastern Frederick, and portions of Howard and Anne Arundel counties. At the time of its founding, Cecil County also included modern Kent County and the border on the Eastern Shore of the Chesapeake Bay went as far south as the Chester River, until its later formation in 1706. The Piscataway traded with the Susquehannocks near Conowingo, and with Lenape of the Delaware valley and their Nanticoke allies near the Elk River and Elk Neck Peninsula. A southern tribe sometimes called the Shawnace also moved into what later became North East, Maryland. Captain John Smith visited the area in 1608. William Claiborne, a Puritan trader based in Virginia, earlier established a trading post at what is now known as Garrett Island at the mouth of the Susquehanna River near what became Perryville. Bohemian immigrant Augustine Herman lobbied for Cecil County's creation, and drew the 1674 maps, in exchange for which Herman received extensive land grants, including one developed as Bohemia Manor, where he eventually died. Another early developer was George Talbot, appointed Surveyor-General of Maryland in 1683, who came from Ballyconnell, County Cavan, Ireland. Talbot's original grant of land in Susquehanna, Cecil County is viewable online. Its subsequent history is told in the Crofton Papers, page 153.

Until the American Revolution, Cecil County was an important shipping center, both within the colonies and abroad. It exported not only its own agricultural products but also animal skins from the west and tobacco from the south. St. Francis Xavier Church (Warwick, Maryland) begun as a Jesuit mission in 1704 and rebuilt in 1792, is one of Maryland's oldest churches, though now a museum. St. Mary Anne's Episcopal Church, authorized in 1706 and rebuilt in 1742 is another (and still in use, as well as maintaining a historic graveyard). West Nottingham Academy, founded by Presbyterian Rev. Samuel Finley in 1744, educated Benjamin Rush and Richard Stockton, both of whom signed the Declaration of Independence, and still operates today (though disaffiliated from the Presbyterian church and with additional buildings). The Principio Furnace, founded in 1719, became an important exporter of pig iron. During the American Revolution both British and colonial troops traveled through Cecil County, although no major battles occurred within its borders. The Battle of Cooch's Bridge occurred in nearby Delaware, and both General Howe and General George Washington stopped in Elkton during the summer of 1777. Robert Alexander, the area's delegate to the Continental Congress of 1776, spoke with both sides but ultimately decided to go into exile in England without his wife. She remained a loyal Marylander and received a life estate in some of Elkton property that Maryland confiscated.

=== 19th century ===
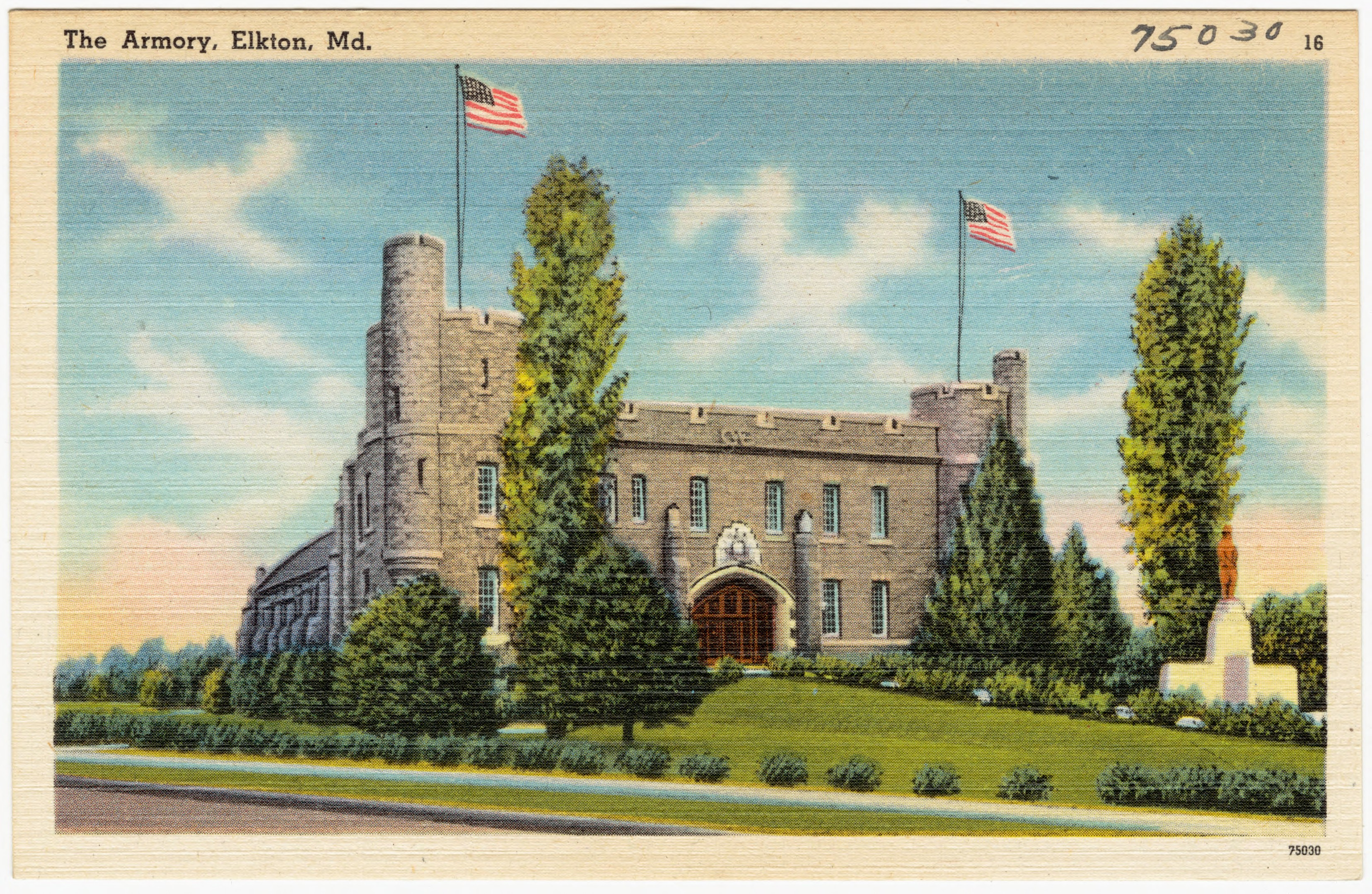
Early 20th century postcard depicting Cecil County's Elkton Armory

The War of 1812 caused Cecil County considerable damage. Not only did British Admiral George Cockburn blockade the upper Chesapeake Bay, in response to musket fire from colonials at Welch Point, his troops destroyed a trading post known as Frenchtown. They tried to sail further up the Elk River to the county seat at Elkton, but turned back under fire from Fort Defiance, also hindered by a cable across the navigation channel. British troops also destroyed most of Havre de Grace in nearby Harford County, Maryland. Cockburn's ships then traveled up the Sassafras River, and, meeting resistance, destroyed Georgetown, Maryland and Fredericktown, Maryland. Avoiding Port Deposit which rumors called heavily defended, the British destroyed the Principio Iron Works, an important military target.

Port Deposit boomed after the Susquehanna Canal opened in 1812. Engineer James Rumsey, who grew up in Bohemia Manor before moving to Bath, Virginia (or Berkeley Springs, West Virginia), invented a steamboat which he demonstrated to George Washington, before traveling to London to secure patents against competition from John Finch. Rumsey died there in 1792, but his lawyer brother Benjamin Rumsey moved south to Joppa, Maryland and served as Maryland's Chief Justice for 25 years. Steamboats, using technology such as by Robert Fulton, came to dominate travel on the bay during the following decades. The Eagle, built in Philadelphia in 1813, transported travelers between Baltimore and Elkton, where they connected with stagecoaches to travel to Wilmington, Philadelphia and other points north. An 1802 attempt to build a canal to connect the Elk River to Christiana, Delaware (connecting the Chesapeake and Delaware watersheds) failed within two years. However, between 1824 and 1829, with financial support from the states of Maryland, Delaware, and Pennsylvania, over 2600 workers built the 14 miles long Chesapeake and Delaware Canal, which became for a while the busiest canal in the new nation. The U.S. Army Corps of Engineers still operates it today, and Chesapeake City, Maryland, which had been Bohemia Manor until 1839, has a museum explaining the canal's importance. Railroads and bridges also proved economically important to Cecil County and surrounding region. The New Castle and Frenchtown Railroad began service in 1831. Railroads crisscrossed Cecil county within three decades, although they ultimately greatly reduced its importance as a trading center. Cities such as Philadelphia and Baltimore could achieve economies of scale impossible for the county's small Chesapeake ports. Even the railroad's Frenchtown section was abandoned in 1859, and the port became a ghost town, though other sections remain in use, operated by the Norfolk Southern Railway.

During the American Civil War, Perryville, Maryland became an important staging ground for Union troops. It had been the halfway point of the railroad line between Wilmington and Baltimore, but damage to the section into Baltimore caused Union troops to embark ferries at Perryville. No Civil War battles occurred in Cecil County, but residents had strongly divided loyalties. Slavery had declined from 3,400 slaves in the county in 1790 to just 800 in 1850. The Underground Railroad had crossed through Cecil County, perhaps assisted by the 'Fighting Quaker,' former Congressman and U.S. Marshall John Conard, who moved to North East between 1834 and 1851 and was reburied at St. Mary Anne's Episcopal Church there after his death in Philadelphia in 1857. Frederick Douglass crossed Cecil County on his road to freedom in 1838. While Jacob Tome made his fortune in the area and stayed, other Cecil County natives left in search of economic opportunity. David Davis moved to Illinois upon graduating from Yale Law School in 1835, where he became Abraham Lincoln's law partner and later served in that legislature as well as a judge, before moving to Washington D.C. to help President Lincoln, who later named him to the United States Supreme Court. Slavery's abolition affected many local property owners, as well as their slaves. After the war, Perryville again became a railroad town, and later received business from interstate highway travelers crossing the Susquehanna bridges. Although Cecil County had once been one of the wealthiest in Maryland and has worked hard recently to attract industry as well as tourist dollars, the average income of residents is now near that of Americans as a whole.

=== 20th and 21st centuries ===
From the start, Cecil County's future was shaped by its strategic location between the growing cities of Baltimore, Philadelphia, Washington, D.C., and New York City. In the 20th century, as modern highways arrived its placement along the heavily traveled northeast corridor brought new opportunities and change to the county. By June 1941, the final segment of the Philadelphia Road, the new dual highway designated as Route 40 was completed across the center of Cecil County. In 1943, the dual highway was dedicated as the Pulaski Highway, to honor the Polish patriot and friend of Revolutionary American, according to The Baltimore Sun. Soon new motels, restaurants, and gas stations started sprouting up along what was once rural fields and woods.

On November 14, 1963, President John F. Kennedy visited Cecil County to formally open and dedicate the Northeastern Expressway (I-95). Motorists were relieved to be "on the clear new road" one editor noted in The Baltimore Sun. After President Kennedy was assassinated in Dallas, I-95 was rededicated as the John F. Kennedy Memorial Highway. As traffic started zipping along the superhighway, without one light halting the fast trip, a corridor that would yield major dividends to the county had opened. It spurred business growth along the route, as commercial, industrial, and residential development clustered near the interchanges in the decades ahead.

In 2013, the county became a Second Amendment sanctuary.

Cecil County has a number of properties on the National Register of Historic Places.

== Politics, government and law ==
In the early post-Civil War period, Cecil County, having been generally pro-secession, leaned strongly towards the Democratic Party. It was carried by the Democratic Party nominee in every Presidential election between 1868 and 1920 except that of 1896 when the Northeast was vigorously opposed to William Jennings Bryan’s “free silver” policy. Since Dwight Eisenhower carried the county in 1952, Cecil County has become a solidly Republican county. The last Democrat to carry the county was Jimmy Carter in 1976.

Prior to December 3, 2012, Cecil County was governed by county commissioners, the traditional form of county government in Maryland. On that date, Cecil County began governance under a new charter approved via voter referendum in November 2010, which authorized an elected county executive and a five-member County Council, which separates the legislative and executive functions of local government (unlike the old "board of commissioner" system). Cecil County thus joined most of the other larger, increasingly urban and complex county governments in central Maryland with county executive-county council forms, such as Baltimore, Harford, Anne Arundel, Howard, Prince George's, and Montgomery counties. Elected on November 5, 2024, Adam Streight (R) is the current County Executive.

In addition, Cecil County is an area that has some home rule in its towns, in places such as Perryville and North East, who have town governments, and hence have minimal county reliance.

=== Voter registration ===
Voter registration and party enrollment as of March 2025
Republican	36,032	48.62%
Democratic	19,026	25.68%
Unaffiliated	17,550	23.68%
Green	77	0.1%
Working Class	72	0.1%
Other parties	1,346	1.82%
Total	74,103	100%

United States presidential election results for Cecil County, Maryland
Year	Republican		Democratic		Third party(ies)	
Year	No.	%	No.	%	No.	%
1892	2,310	42.32%	2,898	53.09%	251	4.60%
1896	3,128	50.21%	2,908	46.68%	194	3.11%
1900	2,959	48.78%	2,988	49.26%	119	1.96%
1904	2,425	48.14%	2,554	50.70%	58	1.15%
1908	2,378	45.04%	2,847	53.92%	55	1.04%
1912	1,509	31.86%	2,491	52.60%	736	15.54%
1916	1,959	42.34%	2,587	55.91%	81	1.75%
1920	3,435	49.37%	3,468	49.85%	54	0.78%
1924	3,156	50.37%	2,863	45.69%	247	3.94%
1928	5,706	71.67%	2,201	27.64%	55	0.69%
1932	3,569	44.84%	4,282	53.80%	108	1.36%
1936	3,617	42.15%	4,914	57.26%	51	0.59%
1940	3,878	41.75%	5,360	57.71%	50	0.54%
1944	3,680	44.11%	4,662	55.89%	0	0.00%
1948	3,866	46.94%	4,323	52.49%	47	0.57%
1952	6,482	53.58%	5,590	46.21%	26	0.21%
1956	7,217	59.38%	4,936	40.62%	0	0.00%
1960	7,368	54.85%	6,065	45.15%	0	0.00%
1964	5,330	40.43%	7,854	59.57%	0	0.00%
1968	6,462	45.46%	4,517	31.78%	3,235	22.76%
1972	10,759	70.82%	4,113	27.08%	319	2.10%
1976	7,833	46.67%	8,950	53.33%	0	0.00%
1980	9,673	51.33%	7,937	42.12%	1,236	6.56%
1984	13,111	65.93%	6,681	33.60%	93	0.47%
1988	13,224	62.51%	7,807	36.90%	124	0.59%
1992	10,784	39.47%	10,232	37.45%	6,303	23.07%
1996	10,885	44.50%	10,144	41.47%	3,431	14.03%
2000	15,494	53.66%	12,327	42.69%	1,055	3.65%
2004	22,556	59.87%	14,680	38.97%	438	1.16%
2008	23,855	56.14%	17,665	41.57%	974	2.29%
2012	24,806	58.39%	16,557	38.98%	1,117	2.63%
2016	28,868	63.77%	13,650	30.15%	2,751	6.08%
2020	29,439	62.03%	16,809	35.42%	1,214	2.56%
2024	33,871	64.11%	17,628	33.37%	1,332	2.52%

== Geography ==
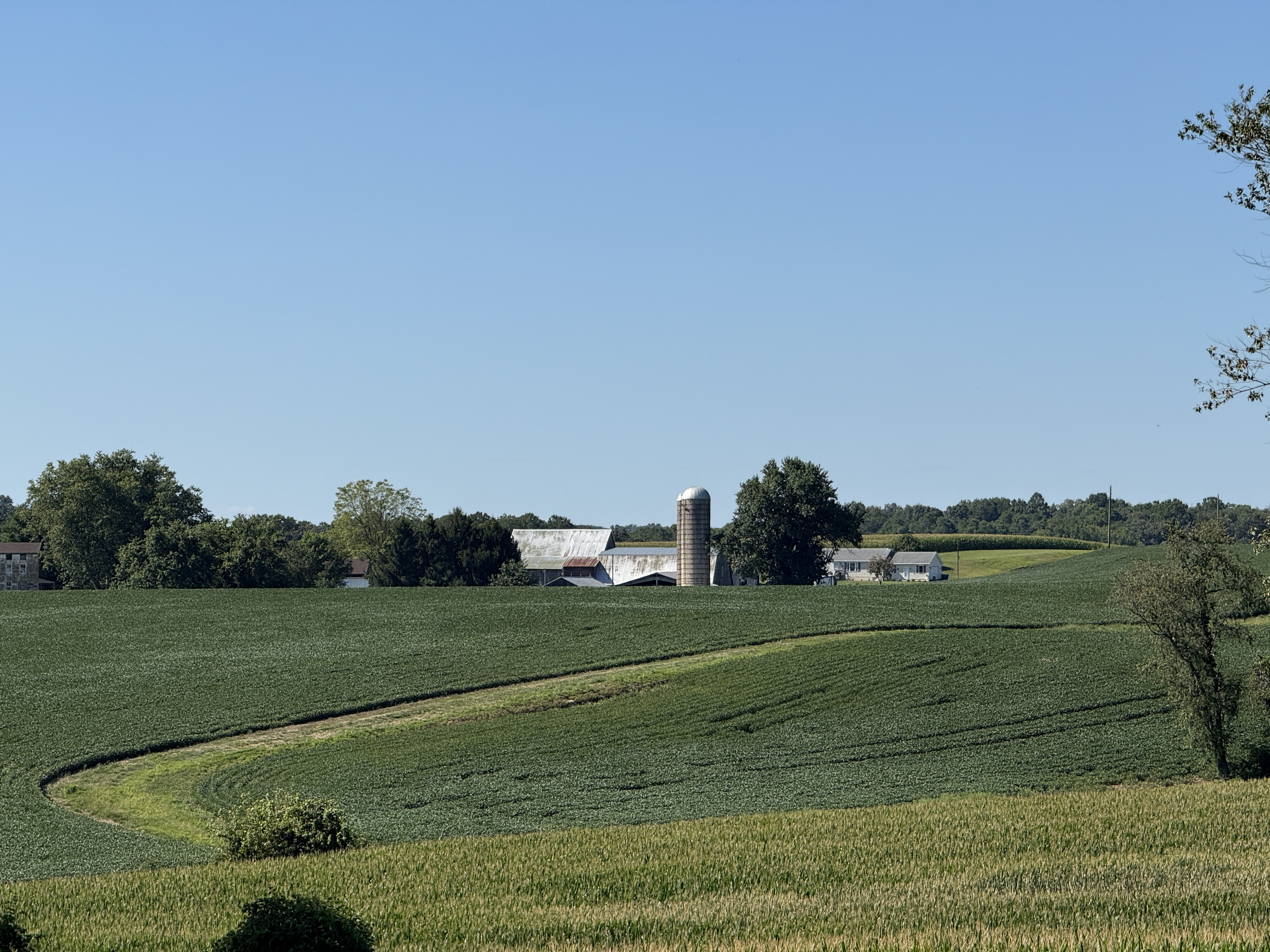
Farmland near Fair Hill in northeastern Cecil County

According to the U.S. Census Bureau, the county has a total area of 418 square miles (1,080 km^{2}), of which 346 square miles (900 km^{2}) is land and 72 square miles (190 km^{2}) (17%) is water.

Cecil County is in the northeast corner of Maryland, bounded on the north and east by the Mason–Dixon line with Pennsylvania and Delaware. The western border is defined by the lower reaches of the Susquehanna River and the northernmost coves, flats and tributaries of the Chesapeake Bay. On the south, the county is bounded by the Sassafras River and Kent County, Maryland. The county is part of the Delmarva Peninsula as well as Maryland's "Eastern Shore."

Topographically, Cecil County straddles the border between the rolling hills of the Piedmont Plateau north of U.S. Route 40 and the flatlands of the Atlantic Coastal Plain to the south. The highest and most rugged hills are found in the northwestern and north-central parts of the county, reaching 534 feet (163 m) just south of the Mason–Dixon line near Nottingham, Pennsylvania and just east of U.S. Route 1. The lowest elevation is sea level along the Chesapeake Bay.

Cecil County is primarily rural, with denser development around the county seat of Elkton and along U.S. Route 40. The county is bisected from east to west by the Chesapeake and Delaware Canal, which connects the Delaware River to the Chesapeake Bay by way of the Elk River. The canal passes through the town of Chesapeake City, where a high-level bridge facilitates the passage of large ships beneath Maryland Route 213.

Cecil County is also bisected east-to-west by Interstate 95, known as the John F. Kennedy Memorial Highway in Maryland. The highway provides a major artery for traffic between the Baltimore–Washington area to the southwest and the Philadelphia and New York and New Jersey regions to the northeast. Cecil County is designated as part of the Philadelphia metropolitan area.

=== Adjacent counties ===
- Chester County, Pennsylvania (north)
- Lancaster County, Pennsylvania (northwest)
- New Castle County, Delaware (east)
- Harford County (west)
- Kent County (south)

=== Climate ===
Cecil County has a humid subtropical climate (Cfa) except in higher northern areas where a hot-summer humid continental climate (Dfa) exists. There are four distinct seasons and seven months average above 50 °F (10 °C).) The hardiness zone is mostly 7a.

Climate data for Elkton, Maryland
Month	Jan	Feb	Mar	Apr	May	Jun	Jul	Aug	Sep	Oct	Nov	Dec	Year
Record high °F (°C)	75 (24)	79 (26)	89 (32)	94 (34)	97 (36)	100 (38)	105 (41)	103 (39)	100 (38)	90 (32)	85 (29)	75 (24)	105 (41)
Mean daily maximum °F (°C)	41 (5)	45 (7)	55 (13)	66 (19)	76 (24)	84 (29)	88 (31)	85 (29)	79 (26)	68 (20)	57 (14)	46 (8)	66 (19)
Mean daily minimum °F (°C)	23 (−5)	25 (−4)	32 (0)	41 (5)	51 (11)	60 (16)	65 (18)	64 (18)	57 (14)	44 (7)	34 (1)	28 (−2)	44 (7)
Record low °F (°C)	−10 (−23)	−8 (−22)	4 (−16)	14 (−10)	28 (−2)	38 (3)	41 (5)	42 (6)	33 (1)	23 (−5)	12 (−11)	−6 (−21)	−10 (−23)
Average precipitation inches (mm)	3.47 (88)	2.73 (69)	4.04 (103)	3.53 (90)	4.41 (112)	4.06 (103)	4.49 (114)	4.01 (102)	4.28 (109)	3.38 (86)	3.39 (86)	3.56 (90)	45.35 (1,152)
Average snowfall inches (cm)	5.7 (14)	4.4 (11)	1.2 (3.0)	0 (0)	0 (0)	0 (0)	0 (0)	0 (0)	0 (0)	0 (0)	0.4 (1.0)	2.3 (5.8)	14 (34.8)

== Transportation ==
=== Major roads and highways ===
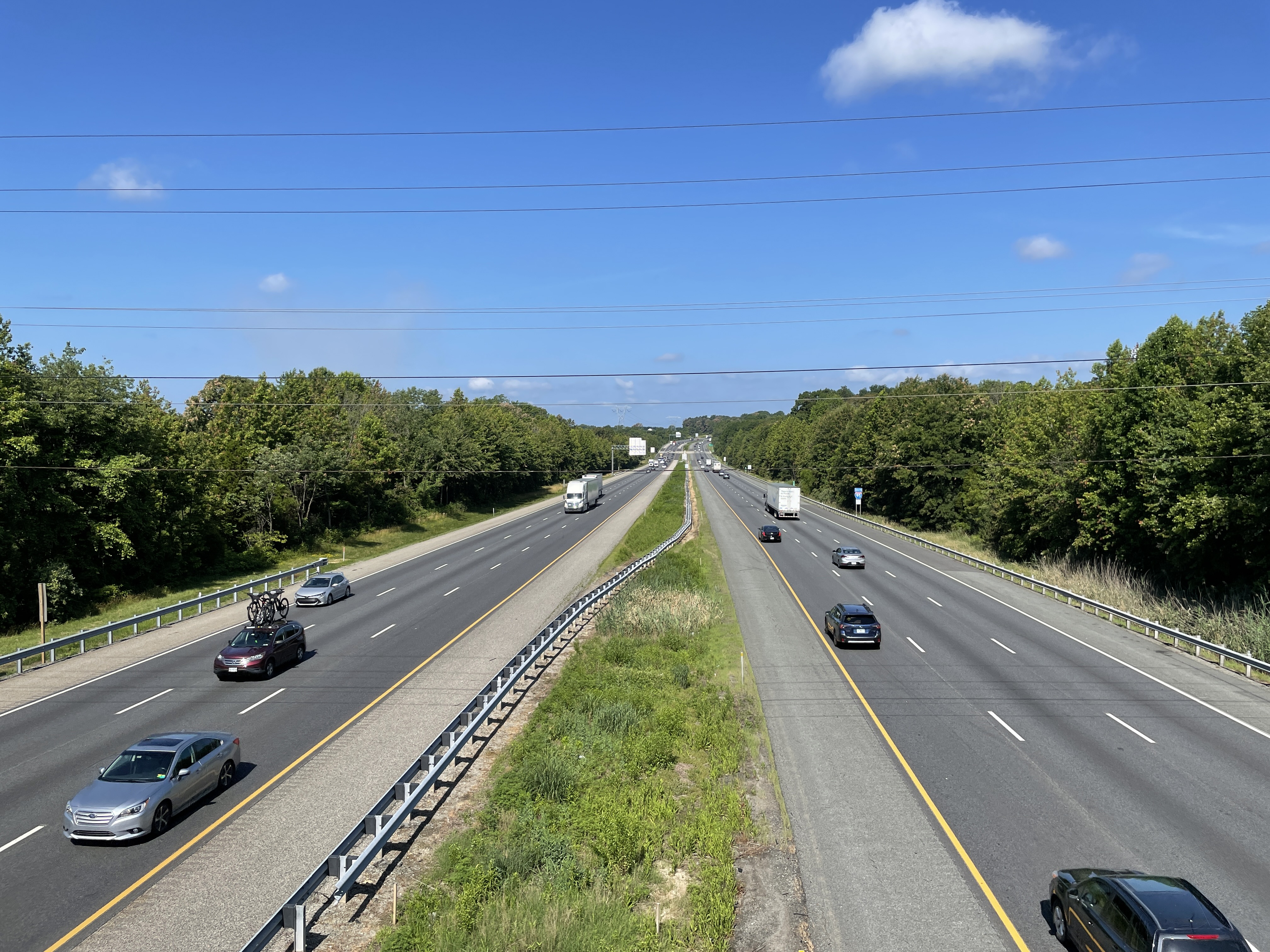
I-95 southbound past MD 279 in Cecil County

- I-95
- US 1
- US 40
- US 222
- US 301
- MD 7
- MD 213
- MD 222
- MD 267
- MD 272
- MD 273
- MD 274
- MD 275
- MD 276
- MD 277
- MD 279
- MD 281
- MD 282
- MD 284
- MD 285
- MD 286
- MD 310
- MD 316
- MD 342
- MD 537
- MD 545
- MD 781
- MD 824
- MD 896

=== Public transportation ===
The county operates Cecil Transit, which provides fixed-route bus and demand responsive transport service throughout Cecil County.

The northern terminus of MARC's Penn Line commuter rail service to Baltimore and Washington, D.C. is in Perryville, Maryland. Recently, the Wilmington Area Planning Council conducted a study on the travel patterns of residents in the county, and they suggested that the MARC line extends from Perryville up to Newark or even Wilmington, where it meets SEPTA and Amtrak lines.

The county is one of only two areas on Amtrak's Acela that does not have local services.

== Demographics ==
Historical population
Census	Pop.	Note	%±
1790	13,625		—
1800	9,018		−33.8%
1810	13,066		44.9%
1820	16,048		22.8%
1830	15,432		−3.8%
1840	17,232		11.7%
1850	18,939		9.9%
1860	23,862		26.0%
1870	25,874		8.4%
1880	27,108		4.8%
1890	25,851		−4.6%
1900	24,662		−4.6%
1910	23,759		−3.7%
1920	23,612		−0.6%
1930	25,827		9.4%
1940	26,407		2.2%
1950	33,356		26.3%
1960	48,408		45.1%
1970	53,291		10.1%
1980	60,430		13.4%
1990	71,347		18.1%
2000	85,951		20.5%
2010	101,108		17.6%
2020	103,725		2.6%
2025 (est.)	107,131	▲	3.3%
U.S. Decennial Census; 1790-1960 1900-1990; 1990-2000 2010 2020

=== Racial and ethnic composition ===
Cecil County, Maryland – Racial and ethnic composition Note: the US Census treats Hispanic/Latino as an ethnic category. This table excludes Latinos from the racial categories and assigns them to a separate category. Hispanics/Latinos may be of any race.
Race / Ethnicity (NH = Non-Hispanic)	Pop 1980	Pop 1990	Pop 2000	Pop 2010	Pop 2020	% 1980	% 1990	% 2000	% 2010	% 2020
White alone (NH)	56,526	67,053	79,546	88,348	83,485	93.54%	93.98%	92.55%	87.38%	80.49%
Black or African American alone (NH)	3,168	3,193	3,321	6,080	7,500	5.24%	4.48%	3.86%	6.01%	7.23%
Native American or Alaska Native alone (NH)	91	145	256	246	231	0.15%	0.20%	0.30%	0.24%	0.22%
Asian alone (NH)	206	307	590	1,078	1,232	0.34%	0.43%	0.69%	1.07%	1.19%
Native Hawaiian or Pacific Islander alone (NH)	x	x	23	43	23	x	x	0.03%	0.04%	0.02%
Other race alone (NH)	35	14	57	90	408	0.06%	0.02%	0.07%	0.09%	0.39%
Mixed race or Multiracial (NH)	x	x	852	1,816	5,396	x	x	0.99%	1.80%	5.20%
Hispanic or Latino (any race)	404	635	1,306	3,407	5,450	0.67%	0.89%	1.52%	3.37%	5.25%
Total	60,430	71,347	85,951	101,108	103,725	100.00%	100.00%	100.00%	100.00%	100.00%

=== 2020 census ===
As of the 2020 census, the county had a population of 103,725 and a median age of 40.7 years. 22.4% of residents were under the age of 18 and 16.6% were 65 years of age or older. For every 100 females there were 98.3 males overall and 96.1 males age 18 and over. 51.7% of residents lived in urban areas, while 48.3% lived in rural areas.

The racial makeup of the county was 81.8% White, 7.5% Black or African American, 0.3% American Indian and Alaska Native, 1.2% Asian, 0.0% Native Hawaiian and Pacific Islander, 2.0% from some other race, and 7.2% from two or more races. Hispanic or Latino residents of any race comprised 5.3% of the population.

There were 39,398 households in the county, of which 31.4% had children under the age of 18 living with them and 24.4% had a female householder with no spouse or partner present. About 24.4% of all households were made up of individuals and 10.2% had someone living alone who was 65 years of age or older.

There were 43,941 housing units, of which 10.3% were vacant. Among occupied housing units, 71.3% were owner-occupied and 28.7% were renter-occupied. The homeowner vacancy rate was 1.4% and the rental vacancy rate was 7.0%.

=== 2010 census ===
As of the 2010 United States census, there were 101,108 people, 36,867 households, and 26,681 families living in the county. The population density was 292.0 inhabitants per square mile (112.7/km^{2}). There were 41,103 housing units at an average density of 118.7 per square mile (45.8/km^{2}). The racial makeup of the county was 89.2% white, 6.2% black or African American, 1.1% Asian, 0.3% American Indian, 1.0% from other races, and 2.2% from two or more races. Those of Hispanic or Latino origin made up 3.4% of the population.

The 2010 census also reported that 87.4% of the population was Non-Hispanic white, 6.2% was black, 0.3% was Native American, 1.1% was Asian, 0.1% was Pacific Islander, 0.1% was Non-Hispanic from some other race, 1.8% was Non-Hispanic from two or more races, and 3.4% was Hispanic or Latino of any race.

Of the 36,867 households, 36.8% had children under the age of 18 living with them, 54.7% were married couples living together, 12.0% had a female householder with no husband present, 27.6% were non-families, and 21.8% of all households were made up of individuals. The average household size was 2.70 and the average family size was 3.13. The median age was 38.9 years.

The median income for a household in the county was $64,886 and the median income for a family was $75,742. Males had a median income of $54,379 versus $39,933 for females. The per capita income for the county was $28,640. About 6.3% of families and 9.0% of the population were below the poverty line, including 12.2% of those under age 18 and 7.8% of those age 65 or over.

=== 2000 census ===
As of the census of 2000, there were 85,951 people, 31,223 households, and 23,292 families living in the county. The population density was 247 inhabitants per square mile (95/km^{2}). There were 34,461 housing units at an average density of 99 per square mile (38/km^{2}). The racial makeup of the county was 93.4% White, 3.9% Black or African American, 0.3% Native American, 0.7% Asian, <0.1% Pacific Islander, 0.5% from other races, and 1.2% from two or more races. 1.5% of the population were Hispanic or Latino of any race. 17.9% were of German, 16.1% Irish, 13.8% English, 13.8% American and 6.5% Italian ancestry.

There were 31,223 households, out of which 37.0% had children under the age of 18 living with them, 58.6% were married couples living together, 11.1% had a female householder with no husband present, and 25.4% were non-families. 19.9% of all households were made up of individuals, and 7.1% had someone living alone who was 65 years of age or older. The average household size was 2.71 and the average family size was 3.12.

In the county, 27.7% of the population was under the age of 18, 7.5% from 18 to 24, 31.2% from 25 to 44, 23.2% from 45 to 64, and 10.5% was 65 years of age or older. The median age was 36 years. For every 100 females, there were 98.20 males. For every 100 females age 18 and over, there were 95.70 males.

The median income for a household in the county was $50,510, and the median income for a family was $56,469. Males had a median income of $40,350 versus $28,646 for females. The per capita income for the county was $21,384. About 5.4% of families and 7.2% of the population were below the poverty line, including 9.2% of those under age 18 and 7.7% of those age 65 or over.

Maryland state planning data suggest that the population of the county could double in the next thirty years, reaching 160,000 by 2030.^{[Tangel]}

Cecil County is home to a small Amish community in the Cecilton area that was founded in 1999. Amish families moved to the area from Lancaster County, Pennsylvania because of increasing costs and the declining amount of farmland there.

== Education ==
There are 17 elementary schools, six middle schools, five high schools, and the Cecil County School of Technology, which specializes in career and technology education, all operated by Cecil County Public Schools. Cecil County schools acts as the school district for the entire county.

Cecil College has four campuses in Cecil County.

=== Libraries ===
There are 7 branches of the Cecil County Public Library and the Library also does significant outreach throughout the county.

== Crime rate ==
The 2017 census accounted a population of 102,746 people. On a scale of one, being low crime, to 100, being high crime, these statistics compare Cecil County's crime rates to US crime averages. In regards to violent crime, which includes murder and nonnegligent manslaughter, forcible rape, robbery, and aggravated assault, the rate is 40.8 compared to the U.S. average of 31.1. In property crime, including offenses being burglary, larceny-theft, motor vehicle theft, and arson, the rate is 39.3 compared to the U.S. average of 38.1.

== Populated areas ==
Towns

- Cecilton
- Charlestown
- Chesapeake City
- Elkton (county seat)
- North East
- Perryville
- Port Deposit
- Rising Sun

Unincorporated communities

- Appleton
- Bay View
- Blue Ball Village
- Calvert
- Carpenter Point
- Cherry Hill
- Childs
- Colora
- Conowingo
- Crystal Beach
- Earleville
- Elk Mills
- Elk Neck
- Fair Hill
- Fredericktown
- Frenchtown
- Hack's Point
- Harrisville
- Hopewell Manor
- Liberty Grove
- Oakwood
- Perry Point
- Providence
- Red Point
- St. Augustine
- Warwick
- Westminister
- White Crystal Beach
- White Hall
- Zion

== Notable people ==
- John Smith, (1580–1631), the first man to explore what is now known as Cecil County
- William Paca, (1740–1799), a Statesman and Revolutionary War leader, served Continental Congress and was later the Governor of Maryland, signer of the Declaration of Independence
- George Read, (1733–1798), judge and Revolutionary War Statesman, served as a member of 2nd Continental Congress, later became a U.S. Senator and Delaware State Chief Justice
- Robert Alexander, born in Cecil County, delegate to the Continental Congress
- John Andrews, (1746–1813), professor and clergyman
- Robert Somers Brookings, founder of the Brookings Institution
- Emma Alice Browne (1835–1890), poet
- Annie McCarer Darlington (1836–1907), poet
- David Davis, Associate Supreme Court Justice
- Levi Davis, Illinois State Auditor and lawyer

== See also ==
- Cecil Whig – the local newspaper
- National Register of Historic Places listings in Cecil County, Maryland
- Cecil County Sheriff's Office
- Cecil County Circuit Courthouse
- Cecil County Central Landfill
- Long Creek (Back Creek tributary)
