= White Hall, Maryland =

White Hall, Maryland may refer to:

- White Hall, Baltimore County, Maryland, an unincorporated community in Baltimore County
- White Hall, Cecil County, Maryland, an unincorporated community in Cecil County
- White Hall, Prince George's County, Maryland, an unincorporated community in Prince George's County

== See also ==
- Whitehall, Maryland (disambiguation)
