= William Winder =

William Winder may refer to:

- William H. Winder (1775–1824), American general in the War of 1812 and lawyer
- William A. Winder (1823–1903), U.S. Army Commanding Officer of Fort Alcatraz
