= Cecil County Public Library =

Public library in Cecil country

- Location: Cecil County, Maryland
- Branches: 6 (Cecilton, Chesapeake City, Elkton, North East, Perryville, Rising Sun)

Collection
- Size: 329,170 (FY 2011)

Access and use
- Circulation: 1,070,494 (FY 2011)
- Population served: 101,108

Other information
- Website: www.cecilcountylibrary.org

The Cecil County Public Library (CCPL) is a public library system in Cecil County, Maryland, located in the northeastern tip of Maryland.

CCPL has circulated over a million items since FY2009, utilizing six branch libraries, a bookmobile, and an e-branch. The Cecil County Public Library has events, classes, reference services, and materials for adults, teenagers, and children available. In 2011, CCPL received a Best Library Blog Award from Salem Press, as well as a Best of Show Award from the American Library Association for their "My Library, My Lifeline" slogan.
