= Liberty Grove, Maryland =

Unincorporated community in Maryland, United States

- Unincorporated community
- Location within Maryland
- Coordinates: 39°39′21″N 76°07′12″W
- Country: United States
- State: Maryland
- County: Cecil
- Elevation: 171 ft (52 m)
- Time zone: UTC-5 (Eastern (EST))
  - Summer (DST): UTC-4 (EDT)
- Area codes: 410 & 443
- GNIS feature ID: 585411

Liberty Grove is an unincorporated community in Cecil County, Maryland, United States.
