= Emma Alice Browne =

American poet

- Born: 1835; 1 mile west of Colora, Maryland, U.S.
- Died: February 6, 1890 (aged 54–55); Danville, Illinois, U.S.
- Resting place: Greenville Union Cemetery, Greenville, Ohio, U.S.
- Occupation: poet
- Spouse(s): John Lewis Beaver (m. 1864; div. ?); Mr. Wait (m. ?)
- Children: 3
- Relatives: Felicia Hemans

Emma Alice Browne (1835 – February 6, 1890) was a 19th-century American poet. She contributed to various periodicals, including Louisville Journal, The Pantagraph, The Saturday Evening Post, Graham's Magazine, and The Methodist Protestant (Baltimore). Many of her early writings were contributed to the Cecil Whig, while the New York Ledger monopolized her writings for the last 32 years of her life. Browne was a friend of George D. Prentice and Sallie M. Bryan.

== Early life and education ==
Emma Alice Browne was born in an unpretentious cottage, near the northeast corner of the cross-roads, on the top of Mount Pleasant, or Vinegar Hill, as it was then called, about 1 mile (1.6 km) west of Colora, Cecil County, Maryland. The date of birth is ambiguous. (Note: Her headstone at Greenville Union Cemetery, Greenville, Darke County, Ohio, section 5, lot 28, space 6, indicates her year of birth was 1835. Her 1890 obituary in The Evening Journal indicates that Browne died on February 6, 1890, aged 54 years; Johnston (1890) records the same thing. However, Coggeshall (1861) records Browne's date of birth as December 25, 1840.) She was the oldest child of William A. and Mary Hester Ann (Touchstone) Browne (d. 1888).

William A. Browne was the youngest son of William Brown, who married Ann Spear, of Chester County, Pennsylvania and settled a few yards north of the State Line, in what is now Lewisville, Chester County, Pennsylvania, where his son William was born, early in the 19th century. He was a stonemason by trade, and though comparatively uneducated, was possessed of imagination, and so endowed with poetic ability that he frequently amused and delighted his fellow-workmen by singing songs which he extemporized while at his work. There is no doubt that Emma inherited much of her poetic talent from him, though she is also a lineal descendant of Felicia Hemans, the English poet. Emma's father was a member of the Maryland Conference of the Methodist Episcopal Church. He died when Emma was a child. The Brown family were of Scotch-Irish extraction, and trace their lineage away back through a long line of ancestors to the time when the name was spelled "Brawn", because of the great muscular development of the Scotch Highlander who founded it.

Hester's brother, James Touchstone, a member of the Union Party, served in the Maryland legislature during the civil war, representing Cecil County.

Her early home was on the Susquehanna River, at the head of tidewater. At the age of three, Emma's father became her first teacher. Before she was four years old, she could repeat Anacreon's "Ode to a Grasshopper", which her father had learned from an old volume of mythology, and taught his daughter to repeat, by reciting it aloud to her, as she sat upon his knee. Subsequently, and before she had learned to read, he taught her in the same manner Byron's "Apostrophe to the Ocean", Campbell's "Battle of Hohenlinden", and Byron's "The Destruction of Sennacherib", all of which seem to have made a deep impression upon her mind, particularly the latter, in speaking of which she characterized it as "a poem whose barbaric glitter and splendor captivated my imagination even at that early period, and fired my fancy with wild visions of Oriental magnificence and sublimity, so that I believe all my after life caught color and warmth and form from those early impressions of the gorgeous word-painting of the East".

She began to dictate poems before she learned to write, composing verses at four years of age, and publishing poems at age ten. Her first effusions appeared in a local paper at Reading, Pennsylvania. The editor of The Methodist Protestant, Rev. E. Yates Reece, was the first editor who encouraged Browne's talent for poetry.

Browne's subsequent education was limited to a few weeks' attendance at a young ladies' seminary at West Chester, Pennsylvania, in the autumn of 1854, and while there, continued to write poetry, some of which was published in the Chester County, Pennsylvania newspapers. In 1855, the family came to Port Deposit, Maryland, where they remained about two years. When she was about sixteen years old, she studied for a few weeks in Wilmington, Delaware. But her mind was so full of poetry that there was no room in it for school studies, and the duties of a student soon became so irksome that she left both the institutions in disgust.

== Career ==
For some time, she resided at Bloomington, Illinois, and then in St. Louis, Missouri, after having secured a good paying position on the Missouri Republican, for which she wrote her only continued story, "Not Wanted".

In 1864, Browne returned East and married Capt. John Lewis Beaver (1836-1896), of Carroll County, Maryland, whose acquaintance she made during the civil war while he was a wounded invalid in the United States Naval Academy Hospital at Annapolis, Maryland. After her marriage, she continued to write under her maiden name, and was always known in the literary world as Emma Alice Browne, though all the rest of the family spelled the name without the final vowel. Her marriage was not a fortunate one. After the marriage ended, she raised three sons. (Note: Johnston (1887), who was a cousin of Browne, stated: "Her marriage was not a fortunate one, and the writer in deference to the wishes of his relative, will only say she is now a widow, with three sons." However, Capt. Beaver outlived Browne by a few years, ergo, this marriage did not end through his death.) Within a year or two, Browne developed a talent for painting. She removed to Danville, Illinois, where she prepared for publication her volume of poems. From the 1860s till her death, she was a regular contributor to the New York Ledger.

"Emma Alice Browne has never been appreciated as her work deserves, but this is due to her continued obscurity than to any defect in her work. Had she been a New England woman, the world would have sung her praises long ago. But as Cecil county has never won very much reputation as a literary centre it is quite natural that a child of that soil should have been lost sight of by the wayside." -The News (Frederick, Maryland), April 20, 1887

Among her notable poetic works were: "Aurelia"; "Niagara" (1857); and "Alone". Still other include, "A Thunder Storm on the Susquehanna", "Evangeline", "Snow Bound", and "The Princess". One of her most popular poems was entitled, "Measuring the Baby".

By the early 1870s, her home was at Woodville, Virginia. After marrying Mr. Wait, (Note: There are two recorded spellings of her second husband's surname. Browne's headstone gives name as Emma A. Browne Wait. Her obituary in The Cecil Whig spells it the same way. Her obituary in The Midland Journal uses the spelling, Waitt.) she spent most of her married life in Illinois.

Browne enjoyed out-of-door exercise. She was an excellent shot, fond of rambles in the deep woods and near waters.

== Death ==
Her life, except about three years of her early girlhood and ten years of her married life, which were spent in her native State, was passed in Missouri and Illinois. She died in the faith of the Catholic Church.

Browne died of pneumonia, after an illness of twelve days, at her home in Danville, Illinois, February 6, 1890, age 54. She was twice married, and was survived by a husband, Mr. Waitt, and three sons from her first marriage. Interment was at Greenville, Ohio, the residence of her brother, William A. Browne, proprietor and editor of the Democratic Advocate of that place. The author, George Johnston (1829-1891) was her cousin.

== Literary style ==
Her warmth of expression and richness of imagery, combined with a curious quaintness, the outgrowth of the vein of mysticism that pervaded her nature, soon attracted the attention of the literati of the U.S., one of whom, George D. Prentice, pronounced her the most extraordinary woman of America:— "for if she can't find a word to suit her purpose, she makes one". While some of her earlier poems may have lacked the artistic finish and depth of meaning of those of mature years, they had a freshness peculiar to themselves, which captivated the readers and rarely failed to make an impression upon those who read them.

Her poetry was characterized by William Turner Coggeshall (1861) as "simple and unaffected", and by Wheeler & Cardwill (1890) as "sweetly rhythmical". Walter L. Fleming (1909) mentioned that her work showed "a wonderful reach of imagination and fervor of expression", while Johnston (1890) stated Browne had "few equals and no superiors as a writer of fugitive poems".

== Selected works ==
=== Poems ===
- "Aurelia"
- "Niagara" (1857)
- "Alone"
- "Measuring the Baby"
- "A Thunder Storm on the Susquehanna"
- "Evangeline"
- "Snow Bound"
- "The Princess"
- "At Christmas Dawn'

=== Continued story ===
- "Not Wanted"
