= Annie McCarer Darlington =

American poet

- Born: Anna McCarer Biles; July 20, 1836; Willow Grove, Cecil County, Maryland, U.S.
- Died: January 24, 1907 (aged 70)
- Resting place: West Chester, Pennsylvania
- Other name: "Annie"
- Occupation: poet
- Spouse: Francis James Darlington (m. 1860; died 1897)
- Writing career
- Pen name: "Gertrude St. Orme"
- Language: English

Annie McCarer Darlington (née, Biles; after marriage, Mrs. F. J. Darlington; pen name, Gertrude St. Orme; July 20, 1836 – January 24, 1907) was an American poet from Maryland. She began writing poetry in her youth and contributed frequently to local periodicals, including The Cecil Democrat and the Cecil Whig, under her pen name. After her marriage, she lived in both Pennsylvania and Florida, dividing her time seasonally between the two regions. Her poetry was well known in Cecil County, Maryland, where she spent her early life and maintained literary ties throughout her career. Darlington died in 1907 and was buried in West Chester, Pennsylvania.

== Biography ==
Anna (nickname, "Annie") McCarer Biles was born July 20, 1836, at Willow Grove, Cecil County, Maryland, about 4 miles (6.4 km) east of the village of Calvert formerly Brick Meeting House, and near the old Blue Ball Tavern. Her parents were Charles Biles and Catharine Ross Biles. Annie was a first cousin of Ida McCormick, their mothers being sisters.

Darlington began to write poetry when about eighteen years of age, and was a frequent contributor to The Cecil Democrat and the Cecil Whig, under the nom de plume of "Gertrude St. Orme".

On November 20, 1860, she married Francis James Darlington (1840–1897), of West Chester, Pennsylvania, and spent the next five years on a farm near Unionville, Chester County, Pennsylvania. The family then took up their residence near Westtown Friends' Boarding School, where they spent the summer season. During the winter, they resided in the town of Melrose, Florida on the banks of Lake Santa Fe.

Anna McCarer Darlington died January 24, 1907, and was buried in West Chester.
