= Cecil County Central Landfill =

Landfill in Cecil County, Maryland, U.S.

Coordinates: 39.594°N 75.915°W

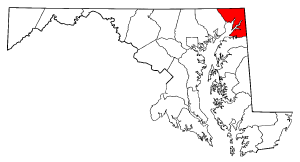
Map depicting where the central landfill is located.

Cecil County Central Landfill is located in Cecil County, Maryland, and has been used for industrial and municipal solid waste since 1978. Through numerous environmental engineering projects, the site has been focused on managing and storing waste from commercial and residential customers. The landfill has roughly 40-100 years of disposal life left and will continue to monitor and manage waste until at least 2065.

== Description ==
The Cecil County Landfill is located in the northeast section of Maryland on a peninsula known as the Elk Neck Peninsula. Within the Peninsula, the entry point is located on Route 7, roughly 1.5 miles southeast from the town of North East, and 2.5 miles southwest from the city of Elkton. The landfill is responsible for managing 400 acres of property within Elk Neck State Forest and receives residential, commercial, industrial, and institutional waste. Along with the central landfill, Cecil County also hosts two small transfer facilities known as Woodlawn Transfer Station and Stemmer's Run Transfer Station, which transport waste to the central landfill. The property currently contains five landfill cells and has roughly 40-100 more years of disposal life.

== History ==
The landfill began as an industrial waste management site purchased in 1969 by the Cecil County government, and would hold this title until 1978. In 1979, the Cecil County government reconditioned the waste site to serve as the county's primary disposal site for commercial, residential, and industrial waste within the county lines. Cecil County listed several manufacturing companies that use the landfill, including RMR Corporation, Central Chemical, General Cable, Airco, Air Reduction Products, Plasticoid, and Air Products.

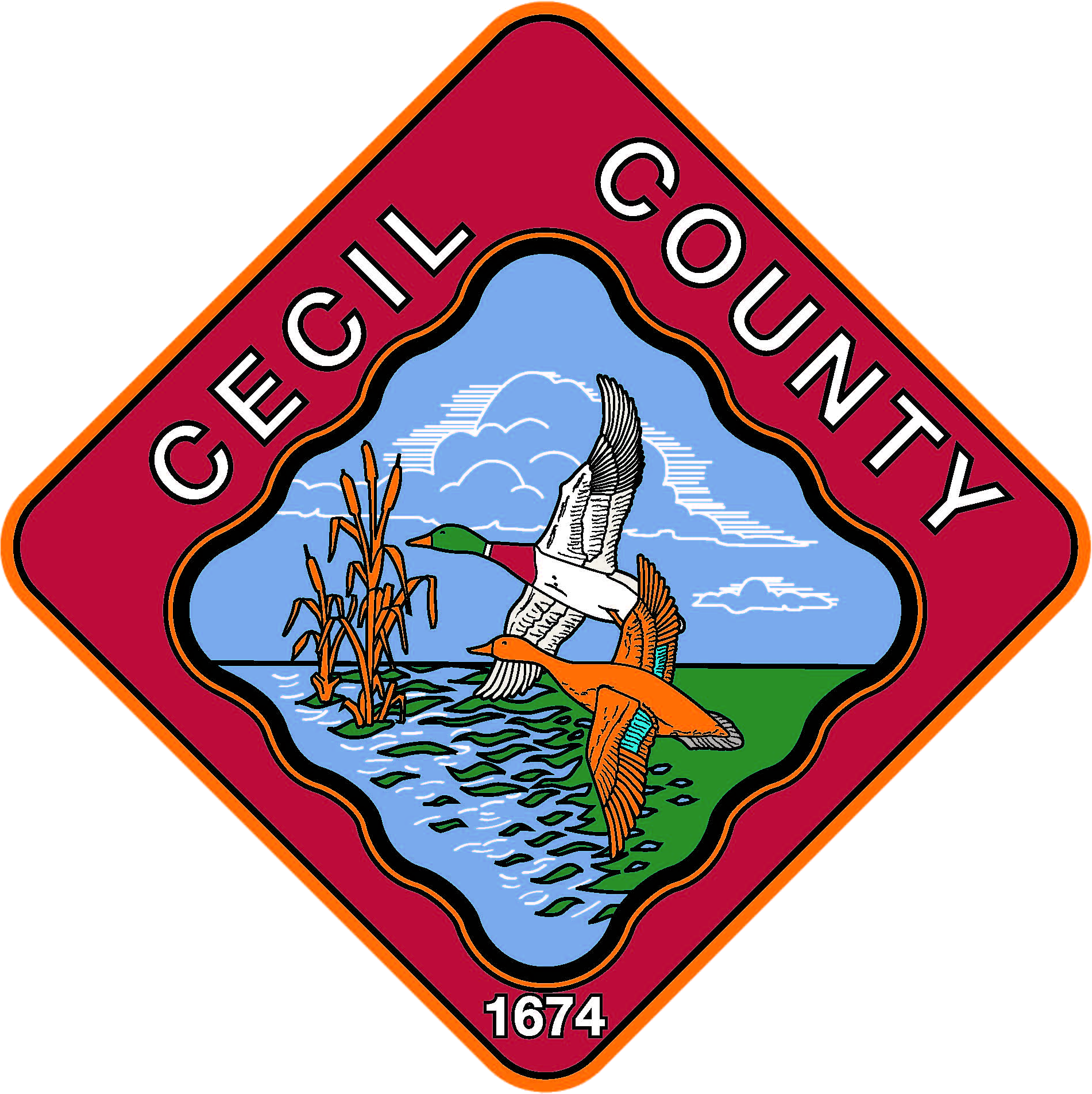
Seal of Cecil County

In June of 1985, the Maryland Department of Health, formally known as the Maryland Department of Health and Mental Hygiene, assessed and directed further analysis based on ample amounts of toxic waste sent to the landfill for disposal. When future investigations transpired under the NUS Corporation, they discovered priority organic and inorganic pollutants in samples of leachate, sediments, wells, and groundwater. In December of 1991, the site was reevaluated under the Maryland Department of the Environment (MDE), in which the site succeeded in examination and needed no further action under the EPA. In January of the year 2000, MDE stated to the Cecil County Environmental Health Department that the three residential wells found on the property be resampled from past examinations (June 1985). With numerous samples, no organic contamination was found in the three wells.

In the 1990s, the county discontinued operation on Cell 4 of the landfill due to potential compromise in the leachate collection system and the liner if more waste was added. In a two stage project, the removal and reinstallation of a new geosynthetic liner and collection system took place in 2012 under the BAI Group, which received accolades locally and within the region. Recently in 2025, the BAI Group alongside Barton and Loguidice completed a similar project on Cell 2, which cost 6.6 million dollars, and spanned over 12 acres on the site. Both of the BAI projects added 8-12 years of disposal life to the landfill.

== Future development ==
As of 2022, the Central Landfill of Cecil County was estimated to be 26% full. In 2024, the county announced it will be planning on expanding the Central Landfill from 68 acres to 112 acres of permitted disposal site. With further development, 8 new disposal cells would be constructed and provide over 16 million cubic yards of landfill capacity, ultimately expanding the landfill's life to at least 2065.
