= Whitehall, Maryland =

Whitehall, Maryland may refer to:

- Whitehall (Annapolis, Maryland), a plantation house in Annapolis listed on the National Register of Historic Places
- Whitehall, Dorchester County, Maryland, an unincorporated community in Dorchester County

== See also ==
- White Hall, Maryland (disambiguation)
