= List of Maryland locations by per capita income =

As of 2010 Maryland was the richest state in the United States of America, with a median household income of $69,272 according to the 2010 census. Per capita income had been $25,615 in 2000 and personal per capita income was $37,331 in 2003. By 2020 per capita income had risen to $43,352.

== Most recent per capita income and household income ==
Maryland economic demographics by county as of 31 December 2020
State	County	Per capita income	Median house– hold income	Total income	Population	Number of house– holds
United States		$35,384	$98,357	$120,344,871 million	340,110,988	122,354,219
Maryland		$43,352	$121,437	$2,677,950 million	6,177,224	2,205,204
	Allegany County	$24,776	$61,653	$16,873 million	68,106	27,369
	Anne Arundel County	$48,125	$132,834	$283,100 million	588,261	213,122
	Baltimore	$32,699	$78,977	$191,520 million	585,708	242,499
	Baltimore County	$41,089	$111,343	$351,119 million	854,535	315,347
	Calvert County	$47,066	$134,127	$43,669 million	92,783	32,558
	Caroline County	$29,814	$82,551	$9,925 million	33,293	12,024
	Carroll County	$43,183	$121,871	$74,659 million	172,891	61,261
	Cecil County	$35,887	$99,814	$37,223 million	103,725	37,293
	Charles County	$42,737	$124,080	$71,207 million	166,617	57,388
	Dorchester County	$29,860	$72,312	$9,713 million	32,531	13,433
	Frederick County	$44,273	$127,570	$120,297 million	271,717	94,299
	Garrett County	$34,006	$76,859	$9,795 million	28,806	12,745
	Harford County	$42,744	$117,283	$111,529 million	260,924	95,094
	Howard County	$55,873	$159,436	$185,675 million	332,317	116,457
	Kent County	$37,699	$87,472	$7,237 million	19,198	8,274
	Montgomery County	$55,643	$159,310	$590,962 million	1,062,061	370,950
	Prince George's County	$38,502	$117,982	$372,391 million	967,201	315,634
	Queen Anne's County	$45,228	$118,721	$22,557 million	49,874	19,000
	Somerset County	$19,507	$56,441	$4,802 million	24,620	8,509
	Talbot County	$49,193	$109,816	$18,460 million	37,526	16,810
	Washington County	$31,525	$86,523	$48,770 million	154,705	56,367
	Wicomico County	$29,049	$78,892	$30,091 million	103,588	38,142
	Worcester County	$41,055	$95,041	$21,537 million	52,460	22,661
	St. Mary's County	$41,430	$114,190	$47,137 million	113,777	41,280

Note: Data is automatically updated to be the latest on Wikidata. At the time of page automation this was the 2020 United States Census and the 2016–2020 American Community Survey.

Ranked Virginia's Per Capita Income Distribution by County latest official survey

Total Maryland per capita income (wikidata:Q1391) = 43,352 US$ (2020 survey methodology)

[Hide/show County Per Capita Income]
No.	Maryland	per capita income US$	year	Wikidata page
1	Howard County, Maryland	55,873	2020	Q398939
2	Montgomery County, Maryland	55,643	2020	Q488659
3	Talbot County, Maryland	49,193	2020	Q511084
4	Anne Arundel County, Maryland	48,125	2020	Q488701
5	Calvert County, Maryland	47,066	2020	Q501277
6	Queen Anne's County, Maryland	45,228	2020	Q511150
7	Frederick County, Maryland	44,273	2020	Q501345
8	Carroll County, Maryland	43,183	2020	Q501323
9	Harford County, Maryland	42,744	2020	Q501284
10	Charles County, Maryland	42,737	2020	Q501319
11	St. Mary's County, Maryland	41,430	2020	Q511120
12	Baltimore County, Maryland	41,089	2020	Q488668
13	Worcester County, Maryland	41,055	2020	Q494072
14	Prince George's County, Maryland	38,502	2020	Q26807
15	Kent County, Maryland	37,699	2020	Q494228
16	Cecil County, Maryland	35,887	2020	Q385365
17	Garrett County, Maryland	34,006	2020	Q501236
18	Baltimore	32,699	2020	Q5092
19	Washington County, Maryland	31,525	2020	Q511164
20	Dorchester County, Maryland	29,860	2020	Q501263
21	Caroline County, Maryland	29,814	2020	Q501242
22	Wicomico County, Maryland	29,049	2020	Q511106
23	Allegany County, Maryland	24,776	2020	Q156257
24	Somerset County, Maryland	19,507	2020	Q511135

== Historic per capita income and household income by location ==
Note: Data is from the 2010 United States Census Data and the 2010-2014 American Community Survey 5-Year Estimates.

Rank	County	Income Per Capita (2014 Dollars)	Number of Households	Median Household Income (2014 Dollars)	Number of Families	Median Family Income (2014 Dollars)
1	Montgomery	$48,916	362,608	$98,704	250,726	$117,373
2	Howard	$48,243	107,516	$110,133	79,606	$129,474
3	Anne Arundel	$41,315	201,429	$89,031	139,320	$102,793
4	Calvert	$38,633	31,041	$95,425	23,602	$107,308
5	Queen Anne's	$38,392	17,354	$86,406	13,278	$98,798
6	Talbot	$37,661	16,140	$58,495	10,934	$72,858
7	Frederick	$37,254	87,259	$84,480	63,252	$98,652
8	Charles	$37,223	52,269	$91,910	38,836	$102,668
9	Carroll	$36,936	59,907	$85,532	44,775	$101,408
10	St. Mary's	$36,602	37,947	$88,190	27,915	$99,428
11	Somerset	$35,392	31,395	$54,392	26,483	$87,485
12	Baltimore (county)	$34,701	313,408	$66,940	203,880	$81,945
13	Worcester	$33,376	20,492	$58,820	13,323	$70,298
14	Prince George's	$32,637	305,115	$73,856	202,436	$84,835
15	Cecil	$29,025	36,453	$65,124	26,271	$77,042
16	Kent	$28,411	7,448	$58,201	4,746	$71,779
17	Washington	$27,173	55,769	$56,477	37,611	$67,365
18	Dorchester	$26,755	13,419	$45,628	9,076	$56,925
19	Wicomico	$26,298	36,479	$52,301	24,368	$61,181
20	Caroline	$25,193	11,842	$55,605	8,512	$65,409
21	Baltimore (city)	$25,062	242,212	$41,819	125,948	$50,361
22	Garrett	$24,974	11,851	$46,096	8,219	$55,739
23	Allegany	$21,653	28,490	$39,794	17,457	$54,540
24	Harford	$19,823	27,498	$36,064	13,493	$47,298
