= Long Creek (Back Creek tributary) =

Long Creek Tributary to Back Creek
- Location within Maryland Location within the United States

Location
- Country: United States
- State: Maryland; Delaware
- County: Cecil (MD); New Castle (DE)

Physical characteristics
- Source: Belltown Run divide
  - location: Marabou Meadows, Delaware
  - coordinates: 39°31′56″N 075°49′28″W
  - elevation: 82 ft (25 m)
- Mouth: Back Creek
  - location: Dans, Maryland
  - coordinates: 39°35′03″N 075°45′15″W
  - elevation: 0 ft (0 m)
- Length: 6.28 mi (10.11 km)
- Basin size: 7.99 square miles (20.7 km^{2})
- Discharge
  - average: 10.17 cu ft/s (0.288 m^{3}/s) at mouth with Back Creek

Basin features
- Progression: southwest
- River system: Elk River
- Tributaries
  - left: unnamed tributaries
  - right: unnamed tributaries
- Bridges: Frazer Road, Woods Road, Augustine Hermann Highway, Boatyard Road

Long Creek is a 6.28 mi (10.11 km) long 2nd order tributary to Back Creek in Cecil County, Maryland.

== Variant names ==
According to the Geographic Names Information System, it has also been known historically as:

- Long Branch
- Margarets Creek

== Course ==
Long Creek rises on the Belltown Run divide at Marabou Meadows in New Castle County, Delaware. Long Creek then flows southwest into Maryland to meet Back Creek at Dans, Maryland.

== Watershed ==
Long Creek drains 7.99 square miles (20.7 km^{2}) of area, receives about 45.4 in/year of precipitation, has a topographic wetness index of 558.56 and is about 18.3% forested.

== See also ==
- List of rivers of Delaware
