= Cherry Hill, Cecil County, Maryland =

Unincorporated community in Maryland, United States

Cherry Hill, Maryland
- Unincorporated community
- Location within the State of Maryland Cherry Hill (the United States)
- Coordinates: 39°39′48″N 75°51′10″W
- Country: United States
- State: Maryland
- County: Cecil
- Elevation: 233 ft (71 m)
- Time zone: UTC-5 (Eastern (EST))
  - Summer (DST): UTC-4 (EDT)
- Area codes: 410, 443, and 667
- GNIS feature ID: 589949

Cherry Hill is an unincorporated community in Cecil County, Maryland, United States. Cherry Hill is located at the intersection of Cherry Hill Road and Leeds Road/Elk Mills Road north of Elkton. Cherry Hill is served by one elementary school and one middle school.
