= Elkton Armory =

- U.S. National Register of Historic Places
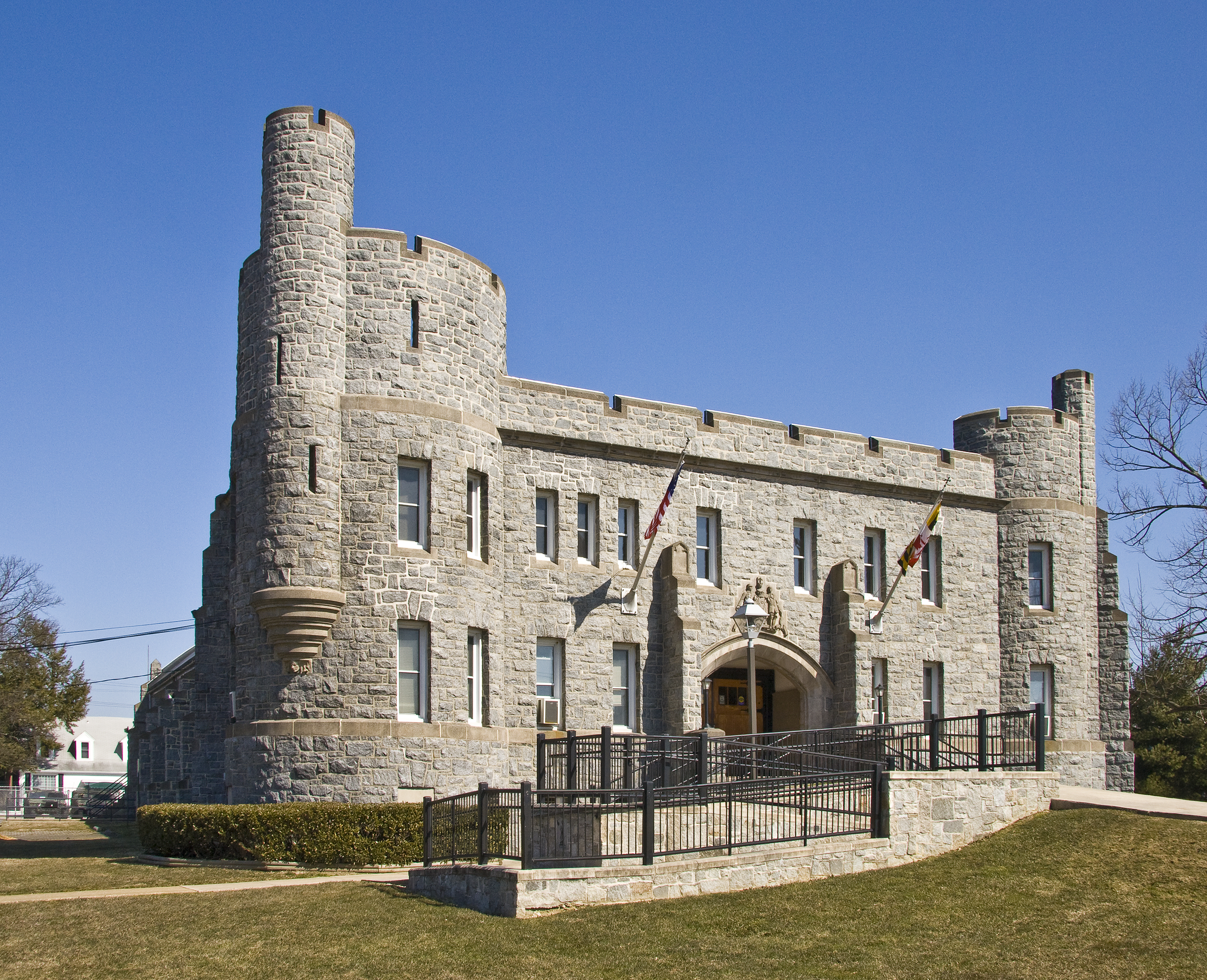
- Elkton Armory, March 2010

- Location within Maryland Location within the United States
- Location: Railroad Ave. & Bow St., Elkton, Maryland
- Coordinates: 39°36′41.07″N 75°49′52.41″W
- Area: 1.1 acres (0.45 ha)
- Built: 1915
- Architectural style: Medieval
- MPS: Maryland National Guard Armories TR
- NRHP reference No.: 85002670
- Added to NRHP: September 25, 1985

Elkton Armory is a historic National Guard armory located at Elkton, Cecil County, Maryland. It was constructed in 1915 and is a two-story brick structure with full basement faced with light gray granite, with a narrower one-story drill hall attached. Its design imitates a castle, with corner towers flanking two-story curtain walls with irregular window placement. The front facade features a projecting center gate, flanked by buttresses, with a carved relief of the State Seal of Maryland above the entry.

It was listed on the National Register of Historic Places in 1985.
