= Robert Alexander (Maryland politician) =

American politician

Robert Alexander (c. 1740 – 1805) was an American planter, lawyer, and politician. During the American Revolution, he was a delegate to the Continental Congress for Maryland in 1776.

== Background ==
Robert Alexander was born on his family's estate at Head of Elk in Cecil County, Maryland about 1740. He was educated to the law and admitted to the bar, and practiced in Baltimore. From 1774 to 1776, he attended the Annapolis Convention as a representative of Baltimore County. He also represented Baltimore in the state's Committee of Safety.

On December 9, 1775 the Convention named Alexander one of their delegates to the Continental Congress. He attended sessions starting in January 1776, and on January 16 the Congress added him to their Secret Committee. Then in April he was added to the Marine Committee. He was re-elected, 4 July 1776, but soon after the promulgation of the Declaration of Independence he sailed for England with other Baltimore loyalists.

In August 1777, after British forces had landed at Head of Elk, he was visited at his home, first by American General George Washington on August 27, and then by British General William Howe three days later. When British forces moved north towards Philadelphia he accompanied them, never to return. By the summer of 1778, when the British abandoned Philadelphia, Alexander fled to England onboard a Royal Navy ship, and made his way to London in 1782.

In 1780, the State of Maryland judged Alexander guilty of high treason, and seized most of his property. His estate became the town of Elkton, Maryland, although the wife he had abandoned was allowed to keep the main house that his father had built in 1735. The house still stands, and is located at 323 Hermitage Drive in Elkton.

Alexander died in exile in London in November 1805.
