= Belltown Run (Muddy Run tributary) =

Belltown Run Tributary to Muddy Run
- Location within Delaware Location within the United States

Location
- Country: United States
- State: Delaware
- County: New Castle

Physical characteristics
- Source: Long Creek divide
  - location: Porter Square, Delaware
  - coordinates: 39°25′11″N 075°44′17″W
  - elevation: 72 ft (22 m)
- Mouth: Muddy Run
  - location: Heather Woods, Delaware
  - coordinates: 39°37′49″N 075°41′51″W
  - elevation: 19 ft (5.8 m)
- Length: 4.49 mi (7.23 km)
- Basin size: 6.24 square miles (16.2 km^{2})
- Discharge
  - location: Muddy Run
  - average: 7.92 cu ft/s (0.224 m^{3}/s) at mouth with Muddy Run

Basin features
- Progression: northeast
- River system: Christina River
- Tributaries
  - left: unnamed tributaries
  - right: unnamed tributaries
- Waterbodies: Becks Pond
- Bridges: Porter Road, US 40, Salem Church Road

Belltown Run is a 4.49-mile-long (7.23 km) tributary to Muddy Run in northern New Castle County, Delaware in the United States.

== Course ==
Belltown Run rises on the Long Creek divide New Castle County, Delaware and flows northeast to meet Muddy Run at Heather Woods.

== Watershed ==
Belltown Run drains 6.24 square miles (16.2 km^{2}) of area, receives about 45.2 in/year of precipitation, has a topographic wetness index of 622.53 and is about 18.0% forested.

== See also ==
- List of Delaware rivers

== Maps ==
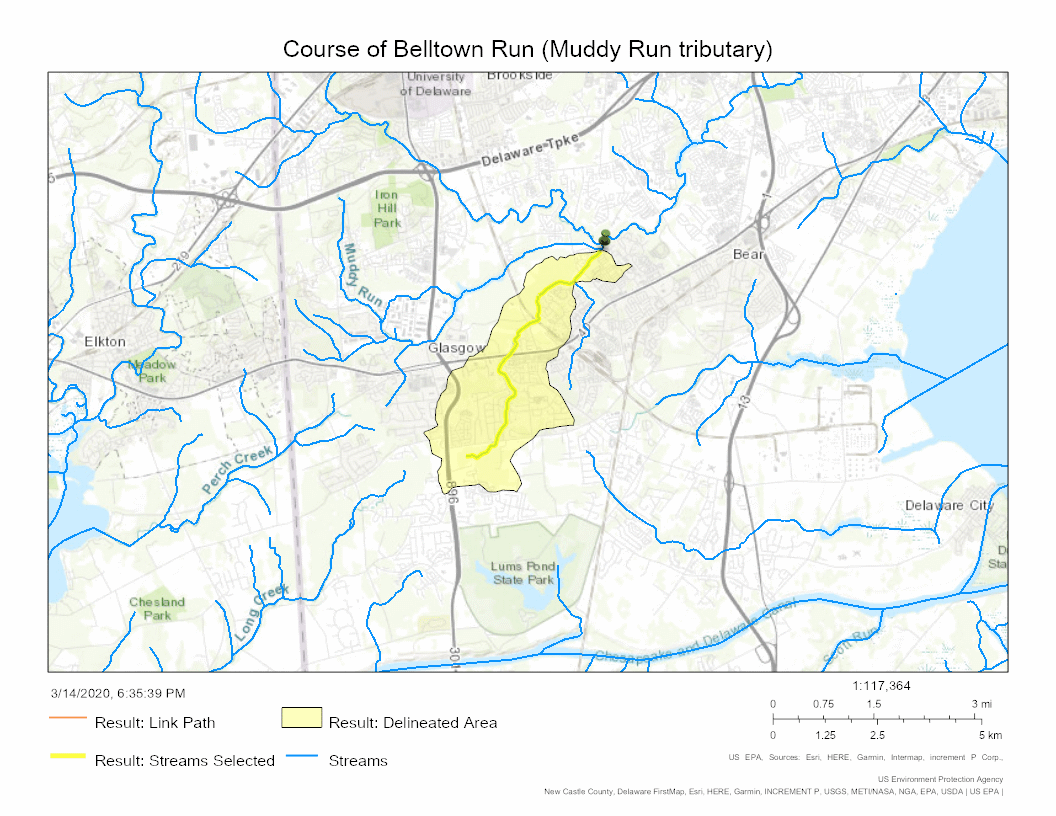
Course of Belltown Run (Muddy Run tributary)

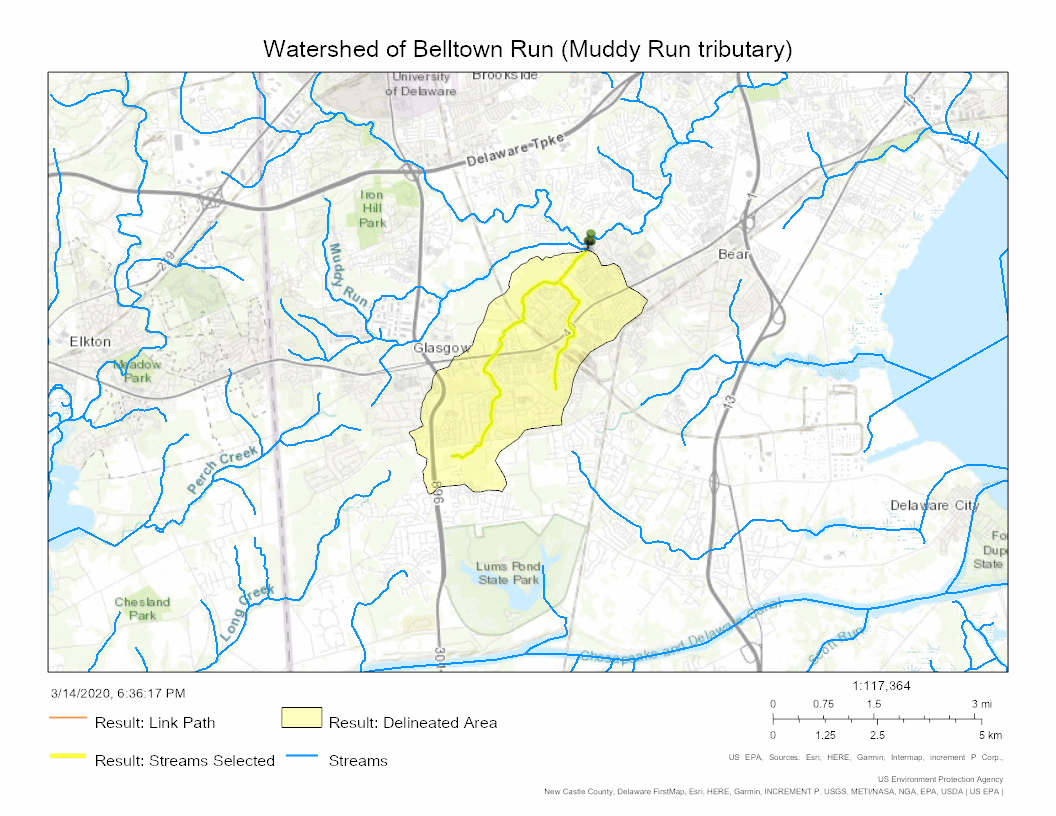
Watershed of Belltown Run (Muddy Run tributary)
