= Muddy Run (Christina River tributary) =

Muddy Run Tributary to Christina River
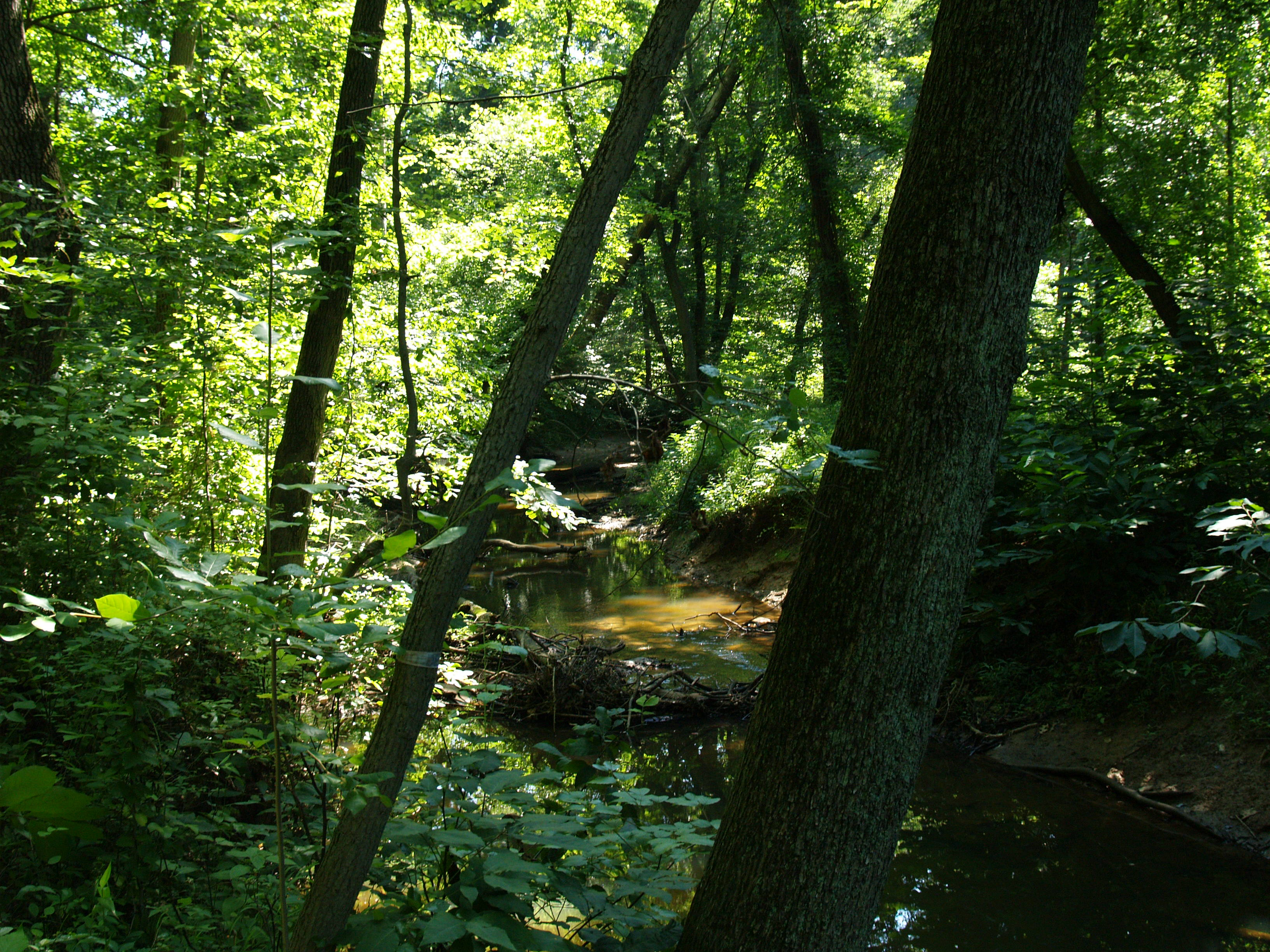
- Muddy Run south of Reybold Road

- Location within Delaware Location within the United States

Location
- Country: United States
- State: Delaware
- County: New Castle

Physical characteristics
- Source: Persimmon Run divide
  - location: Pond at Summit View, Delaware
  - coordinates: 39°38′30″N 075°46′16″W
  - elevation: 155 ft (47 m)
- Mouth: Christina River
  - location: Heather Woods, Delaware
  - coordinates: 39°37′54″N 075°41′51″W
  - elevation: 18 ft (5.5 m)
- Length: 6.61 mi (10.64 km)
- Basin size: 14.95 square miles (38.7 km^{2})
- Discharge
  - location: Christina River
  - average: 7.92 cu ft/s (0.224 m^{3}/s) at mouth with Christina River

Basin features
- Progression: south then northeast
- River system: Christina River
- Tributaries
  - left: unnamed tributaries
  - right: Belltown Run
- Waterbodies: Sunset Lake
- Bridges: I-95, Welsh Tract Road, Smith Way, Old Baltimore Pike, Bartley Drive, Pencader Drive, Glasgow Avenue, DE 896, GBC Drive, DE 72, Salem Church Road

Muddy Run is a 6.61-mile-long (10.64 km) stream in northern New Castle County, Delaware in the United States.

== Course ==
Muddy Run rises on the Persimmon Run divide in New Castle County, Delaware and flows south then northeast to meet the Christina River at Heather Woods.

== Watershed ==
Muddy Run drains 14.95 square miles (38.7 km^{2}) of area, receives about 45.6 in/year of precipitation, has a topographic wetness index of 581.51 and is about 23.1% forested.

== See also ==
- List of Delaware rivers

== Maps ==
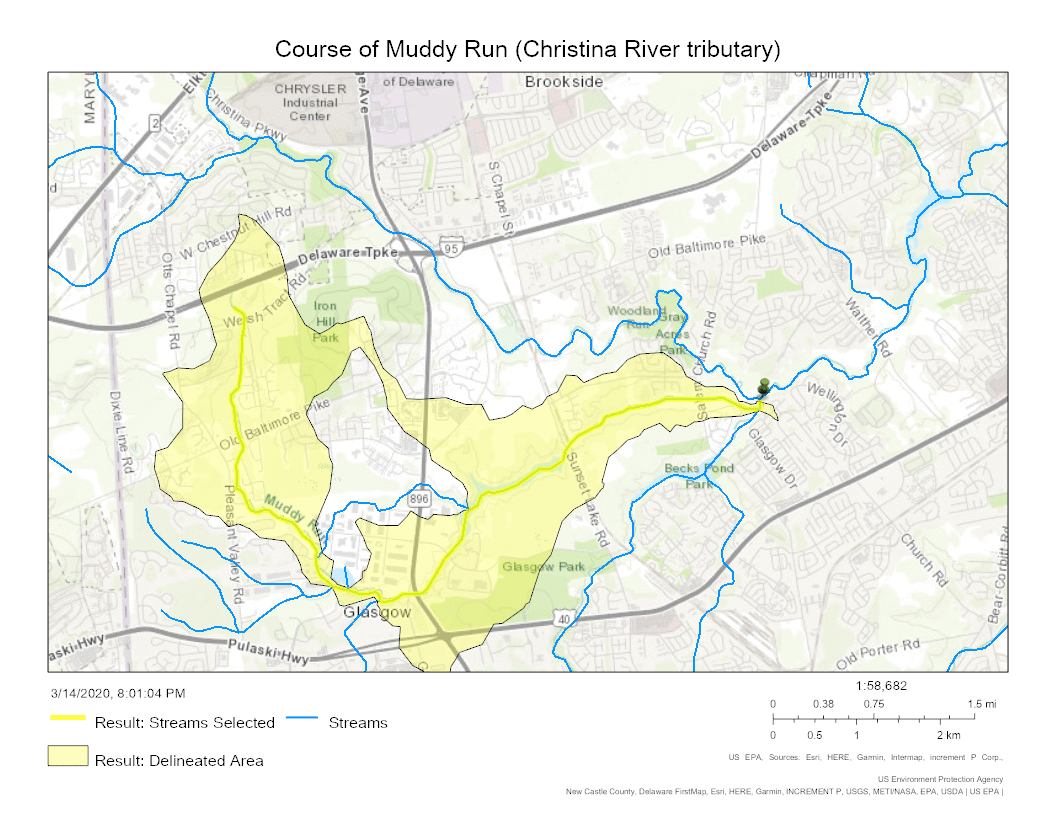
Course of Muddy Run (Christina River tributary)

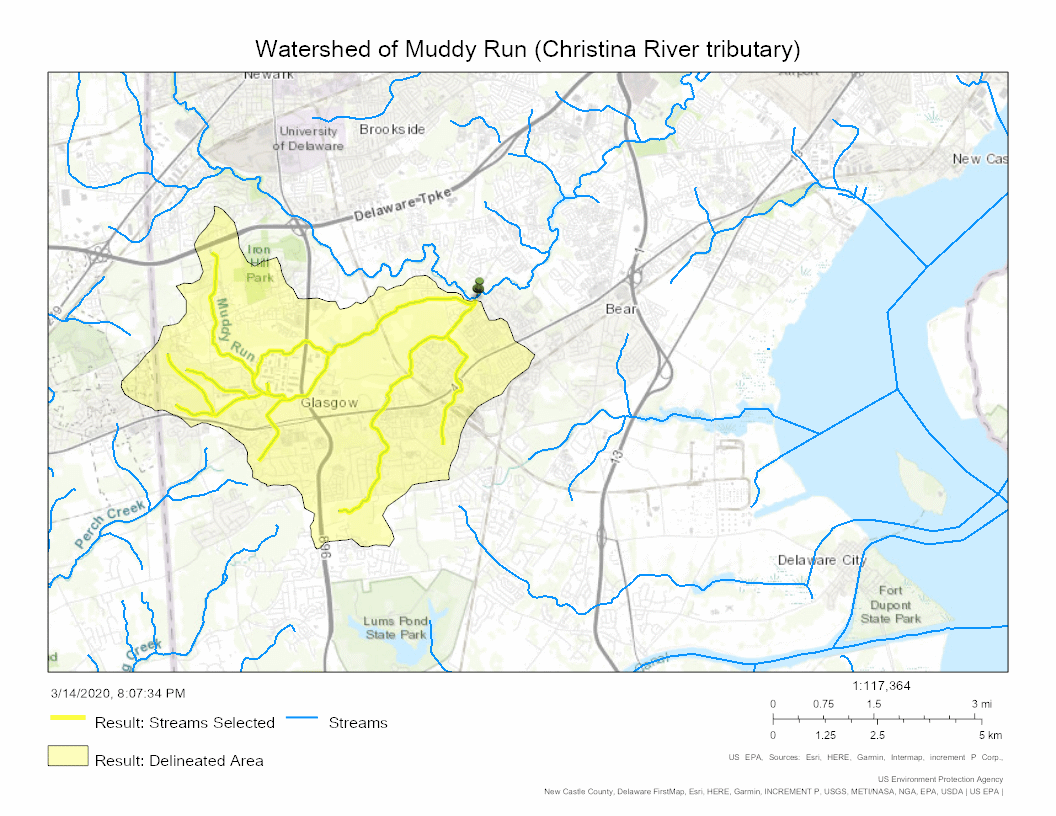
Watershed of Muddy Run (Christina River tributary)
