= Seal of Cecil County, Maryland =

Seal of Cecil County
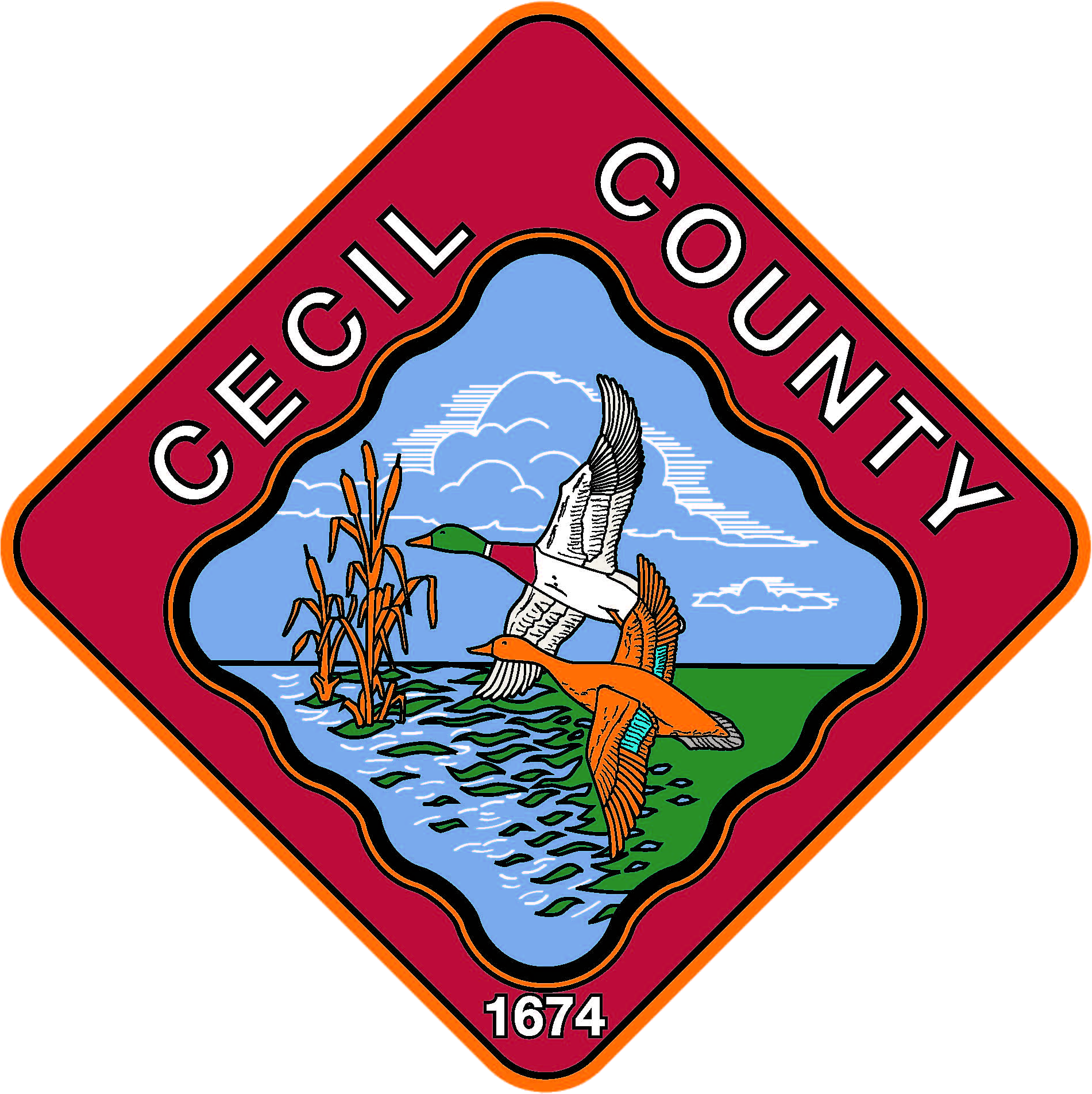
- Armiger: Cecil County
- Adopted: May 20, 2008
- Torse: CECIL COUNTY
- Motto: 1674

The seal of Cecil County was adopted in June 1968 and updated in May 2008. Elements of the seal are featured on the design of the Cecil County flag, which was adopted in 1974.

== History ==
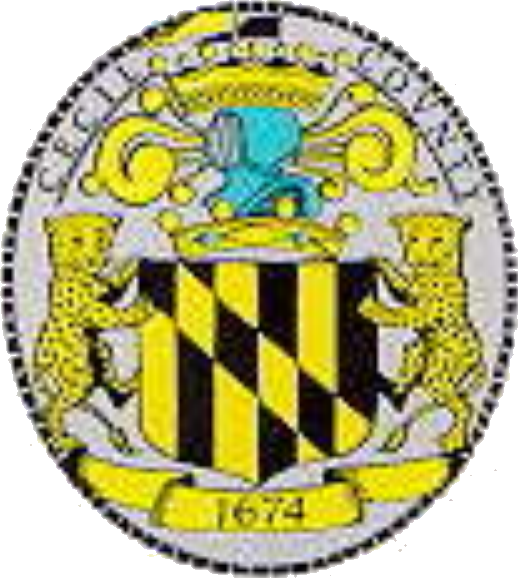
The original seal of Cecil County, from the late 17th century.

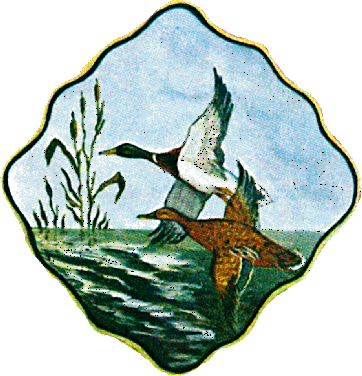
Former seal of Cecil County, used from 1968 to 2008. It is still used on the county flag.

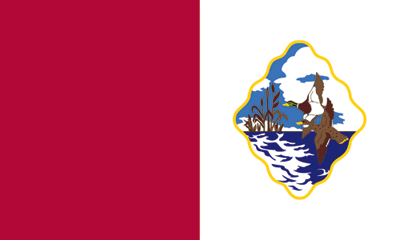
The flag of Cecil County features the 1968 to 2008 seal on it.

=== 1674–1968: Original seal ===
The first seal of Cecil County was adopted in the late 17th century, during English colonial rule. Its design follows traditional English-style heraldic convention, with supporters in the form of leopards. Over time, it fell into obscurity and by the mid-20th century had become virtually forgotten and unknown to the point that even the county government did not know of its appearance or existence.

The original seal is now used by the Cecil County Historical Society.

=== 1968–2008: Former seal ===
On June 11, 1968, the county's Board of County Commissioners, now known as the County Council, adopted a new seal. The county's sheriff during the 1980s reportedly stated that it was designed by a high school sophomore in 1961. The seal is lozenge-shaped and features in the center, two mallard ducks in flight over a shoreline.

Some of the county's residents, particularly those involved in hunting, opposed the inclusion of mallard ducks, preferring canvasback ducks instead as they felt the latter was more geographically accurate. Other residents opposed the adoption of the seal, feeling there was no pressing need to do so.

In 1974, to mark the 300th anniversary of the county's founding, Cecil County held a contest for a flag to be designed for the county as it lacked one at the time. The winning designer was awarded $100 (equivalent to $653 today) and the county adopted her design as its official county flag. The flag is bisected vertically into two sections of equal width. The sinister is white and the dexter is crimson, the latter of which is also the official color of the county. The flag's design incorporates elements of the post-1968 seal on the sinister field.

=== 2008–present: Current seal ===
On May 20, 2008, the 1968 seal was updated by Ord. No. 2008-01 to add more design elements. Namely, a thin black and orange border line was added around the existing seal, surrounded by a crimson red border with "Cecil County" in white letters symmetrically located around the top of the border was added, along with "1674" in white Arabic numerals located horizontally across the bottom of the border, and a thin black and orange border line around the entirety of the seal. The Cecil County flag, which features the seal as it was originally adopted in 1968, was not updated to reflect this change and remained as adopted in 1974. Similarly, nearby Prince George's County's flag also features an outdated depiction of its county seal, the flag having been adopted in 1967 and not having been updated when the seal was modified in 1971. Copyright was registered on November 15, 2010 for the seal with the U.S. Copyright Office.

==== Subsequent efforts to replace ====
In the 1980s, the existence of the old 17th century seal was rediscovered. As a result, this led to confusion as to whether or not the county had two official simultaneous seals as the former was never formally repealed as its existence was not known of. Thus, in 1986, there was a brief push to replace the current seal with the 17th century seal after its existence and likeness were known again, but it ultimately did not succeed and the current seal was retained.

In mid-2013, there was again a renewed push to replace the seal by a county councilman with a new design more resembling the 17th century one. The move was opposed by those who said the effort and cost of changing the seal, numbered in the thousands of dollars, would not be worth such a move. Ultimately, the effort did not succeed and the current seal was retained.
