= John H. Winder =

Confederate Army general (1800–1865)

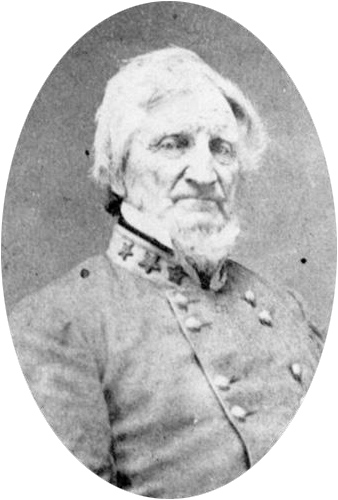
- John Henry Winder, Confederate Army brigadier general
- Born: February 21, 1800; Somerset County, Maryland, US
- Died: February 7, 1865 (aged 64); Florence, South Carolina, US
- Burial place: Green Mount Cemetery
- Spouse: Elizabeth Shepherd (m. 1823; died 1826)
- Children: William A. Winder
- Relatives: William H. Winder (father)
- Military career
- Allegiance: United States of America; Confederate States of America
- Branch: United States Army; Confederate States Army
- Service years: 1820–1823, 1827–1861 (USA); 1861–1865 (CSA)
- Rank: Major (USA); Bvt. Lt. Colonel (USA); Brigadier General (CSA)
- Units: 4th U.S. Artillery; U.S. Rifle Regiment; 3rd U.S. Artillery; 1st U.S. Artillery
- Commands: Confederate Bureau of Prison Camps
- Conflicts: Mexican–American War; Battle of Contreras; Battle of Churubusco; Battle for Mexico City; American Civil War

John Henry Winder (February 21, 1800 – February 7, 1865) was a career United States Army officer who served with distinction during the Mexican–American War. He later served as a Confederate general officer during the American Civil War.

Winder commanded prisoner-of-war camps throughout the South during the war, and was charged with improperly supplying the prisoners in his charge.

== Early life and career ==
Winder was born on February 21, 1800, at "Rewston" in Somerset County, Maryland, a son of U.S. Army Brig. Gen. William H. Winder and his wife Gertrude Polk. Winder's father fought in the War of 1812, most notably as the American commander in the disastrous and rallying defeat at the Battle of Bladensburg and was a second cousin to future Confederate general Charles Sidney Winder.

Winder as a U.S. Army captain

In 1814, Winder entered the United States Military Academy at West Point, and graduated 11th of 30 cadets in 1820. He was commissioned a second lieutenant in the artillery, and served first at Fort McHenry in Baltimore, Maryland, and then in Florida.

During the early 1820s, Winder went through numerous transfers, going from the U.S. Rifle Regiment in 1820, to the 4th U.S. Artillery. Winder resigned his commission on August 31, 1823, and would not return to the Army for almost four years.

On February 12, 1823, he married Elizabeth Shepherd, inheriting slaves through the marriage. The next year his father died, placing him in deep economic strain, and his mother was forced to turn her home into a boardinghouse. Winder failed to manage his father-in-law's plantation successfully, and he was unable to help his mother. In 1826, Elizabeth died, leaving him to raise their young son William A. Winder, which forced him back into the U.S. Army.

On April 2, 1827, Winder was reinstated as a second lieutenant, and he served in the 1st U.S. Artillery. He was promoted to first lieutenant on November 30, 1833. He taught tactics at West Point in 1827 where he met Jefferson Davis and Robert E. Lee, but lost his position after one year having lost his temper with a cadet. Winder served as the 1st Artillery's regimental adjutant from May 23, 1838, until January 20, 1840. He was promoted to captain on October 7, 1842.

== Mexican-American War ==
Winder fought with distinction in Mexico, winning brevet promotions to major on August 20, 1847 (for his conduct at the Battle of Contreras and for the Battle of Churubusco), and to lieutenant colonel on September 14 (for the Battle for Mexico City.) He was wounded in an encounter near the Belén Gate when a piece of bone from the skull of one of his men scratched him in the face.

At the battle of Chapultepec, Winder was responsible for attacking the Military Academy that was defended by Felipe Xicoténcatl and a few hundred cadets. While Winder's forces succeeded in either killing and capturing many of the cadets, that battle became a key part of Mexico's patriotic lore known as the Niños Héroes. In 1947, President Harry S. Truman on a visit to Mexico City made an unscheduled stop at the stone monument to the child heroes. In front of Mexican cadets standing at attention, Truman placed a floral wreath helping to heal the century old wound.

== American Civil War ==
In January 1861, Florida became the third state to secede from the Union. At this time, the pro-secession Winder was in command of the defenses in Pensacola, which included Fort Pickens. However, he was away on leave and so Lt. Adam J. Slemmer took command and prevented the fort from falling into rebel hands. The Union would retain control of the fort for the rest of the war.

Winder resigned his U.S. Army commission on April 20, 1861, and offered his services to the state of North Carolina. He was appointed a colonel in the Confederate Army infantry on May 21. He was then promoted to brigadier general on June 21 and the next day was made Assistant Inspector General of the Camps of Instruction that were in the Confederacy's capital of Richmond, Virginia, a post he would hold until October 21.

On March 1, 1862, Jefferson Davis declared martial law in Richmond and appointed Winder provost marshal general. Winder designated Samuel B. Maccubbin chief of detectives and gave him a force of Plug Uglies imported from Baltimore to police the population of Richmond. Winder's first order was established prohibition of alcohol and required all citizens to surrender their firearms. Even though there were daily accusations or entrapment and corruption against his "plug-ugly" police force, Winder refused to order an investigation. By October 1864 newspapers reported the crime rate in Richmond exceeded the worst days of Baltimore or New York and much of the blame went to the corrupt police force. This earned him the moniker "The Dictator of Richmond".

In addition to his duties involving prisons, he was responsible for dealing with deserters, local law enforcement, and for a short time setting the commodity prices for the residents of a city dealing with a doubled population. During this time, he commanded Libby Prison in Richmond as well.

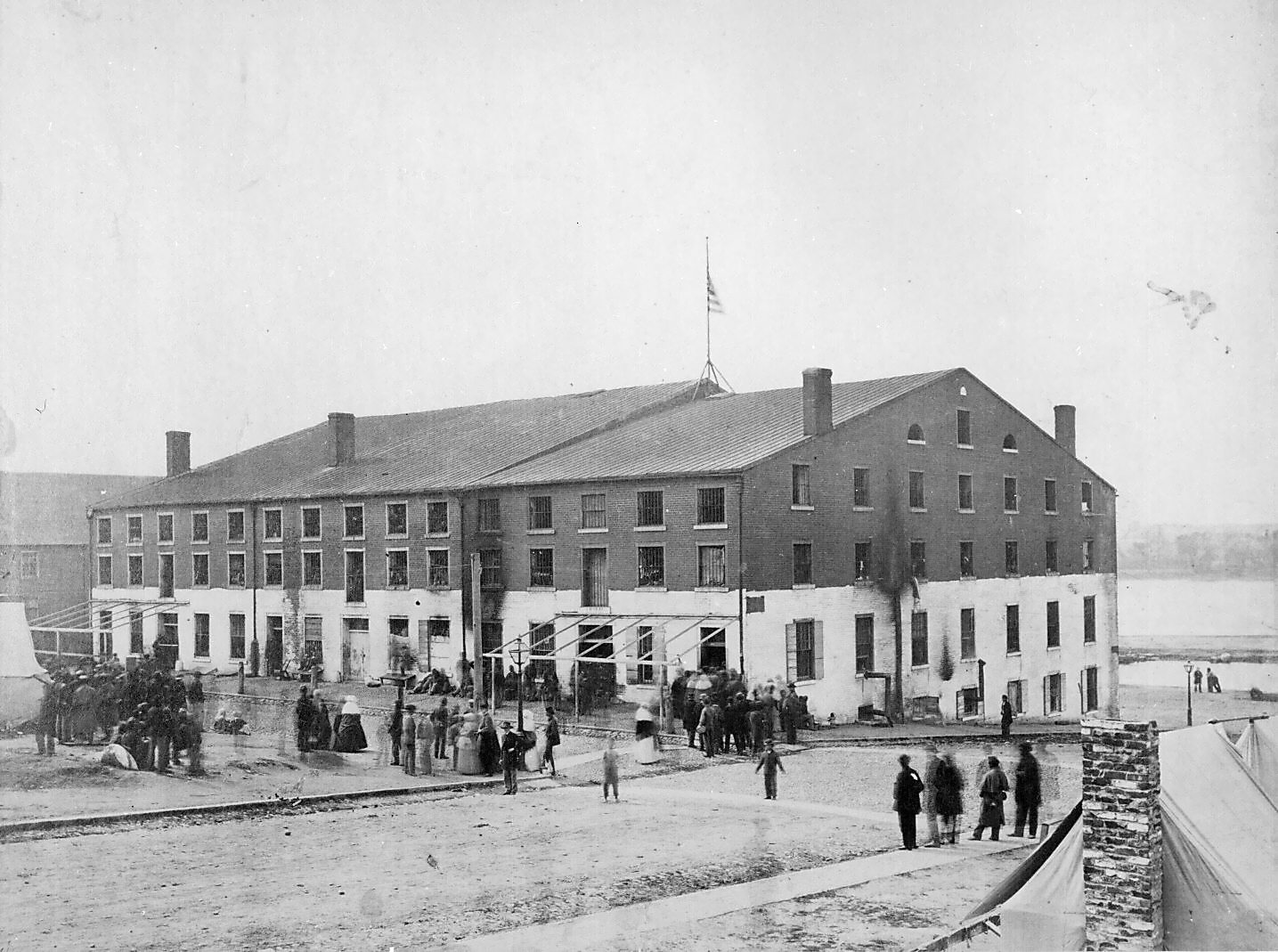
Libby Prison, Richmond, Virginia

In April 1864, Winder appointed Captain Henry Wirz commandant of a new prison camp in Georgia called Camp Sumter, better known as the infamous Andersonville Prison. Winder commanded the Department of Henrico for much of the war, until May 5, 1864. He then commanded the 2nd District of the Department of North Carolina & Southern Virginia from May 25 until June 7. Ten days later, he briefly commanded Camp Sumter himself, until July 26. Winder then was given command of all military prisons in Georgia as well as those in Alabama until November 21, when he was put in charge of the Confederate Bureau of Prison Camps, a post which he held until his death on February 7, 1865.

The assignment to run prisons in the South during the Civil War was a difficult job at best, hampered by the Confederacy's poor supply system combined with diminishing resources. In their post-war writings, some of the high level leaders of the Confederate government voiced the difficulties of Winder's assignment, saying:

...President Davis, Secretary Seddon, and Adjutant Cooper declared that he was a much-maligned man. He was set to perform a task made impossible by the inadequacy of supplies of men, food, clothing, and medicines.

During the war, Winder was frequently derided in Northern newspapers, which accused him of intentionally starving Union prisoners. Military historian Ezra J. Warner believes these charges were without merit, saying, "Winder adopted every means at his command to assure that the prisoners received the same ration as did Confederate soldiers in the field, scanty as that allotment was." However, John McElroy's eyewitness account in his 1879 memoir Andersonville appears to contradict this. McElroy depicts Winder as boasting that he was "killing off more Yankees than twenty regiments in Lee's Army." McElroy claims that on July 27, 1864, Winder issued an order that if Union troops (under General Stoneman) were to come within seven miles of Andersonville, the guards were to "open upon the Stockade [i.e. upon the prisoners] with grapeshot, without reference to the situation beyond these lines of defense".

It was suggested that Winder's controversial tenure as Richmond's provost marshal in 1862–1864 and commissary general of Confederate prisons in 1864–1865 exemplified the inefficient administrative system run by the Confederate Government.

== Death and legacy ==
Winder died on duty in Florence, South Carolina, of a heart attack on February 7, 1865, aged 64. His body was brought back to Maryland and interred at Green Mount Cemetery in Baltimore.

During the Civil War, Camp Winder and the Winder Hospital in Richmond were named after him.

After the Civil War, Winder's son, Capt. William Sidney Winder unsuccessfully tried to clear his father's name.

In 1965, a sign recognizing Winder was erected in Salisbury, Maryland, near the intersection of U.S. Business 13 and U.S. 50 where a historically Black neighborhood was razed in 1950s to make room for the highways. In 1983, due to damage from traffic accidents, the sign was moved to the Wicomico County Courthouse in Salisbury. On June 12, 2020, the sign recognizing Winder was removed. The Winder sign had been the focus of protests for years and was the subject of the 2018 documentary titled The Sign.

== See also ==
- List of American Civil War generals (Confederate)
