= White Hall, Cecil County, Maryland =

Unincorporated community in Maryland, United States

White Hall, Maryland
- Unincorporated community
- Location within Maryland
- Coordinates: 39°35′15″N 75°50′18″W
- Country: United States
- State: Maryland
- County: Cecil
- Elevation: 36 ft (11 m)
- Time zone: UTC-5 (Eastern (EST))
  - Summer (DST): UTC-4 (EDT)
- Area codes: 410 & 443
- GNIS feature ID: 589600

White Hall is an unincorporated community in Cecil County, Maryland, United States. White Hall is located 1.5 miles (2.4 km) south of Elkton.
