= Cecil County Circuit Courthouse =

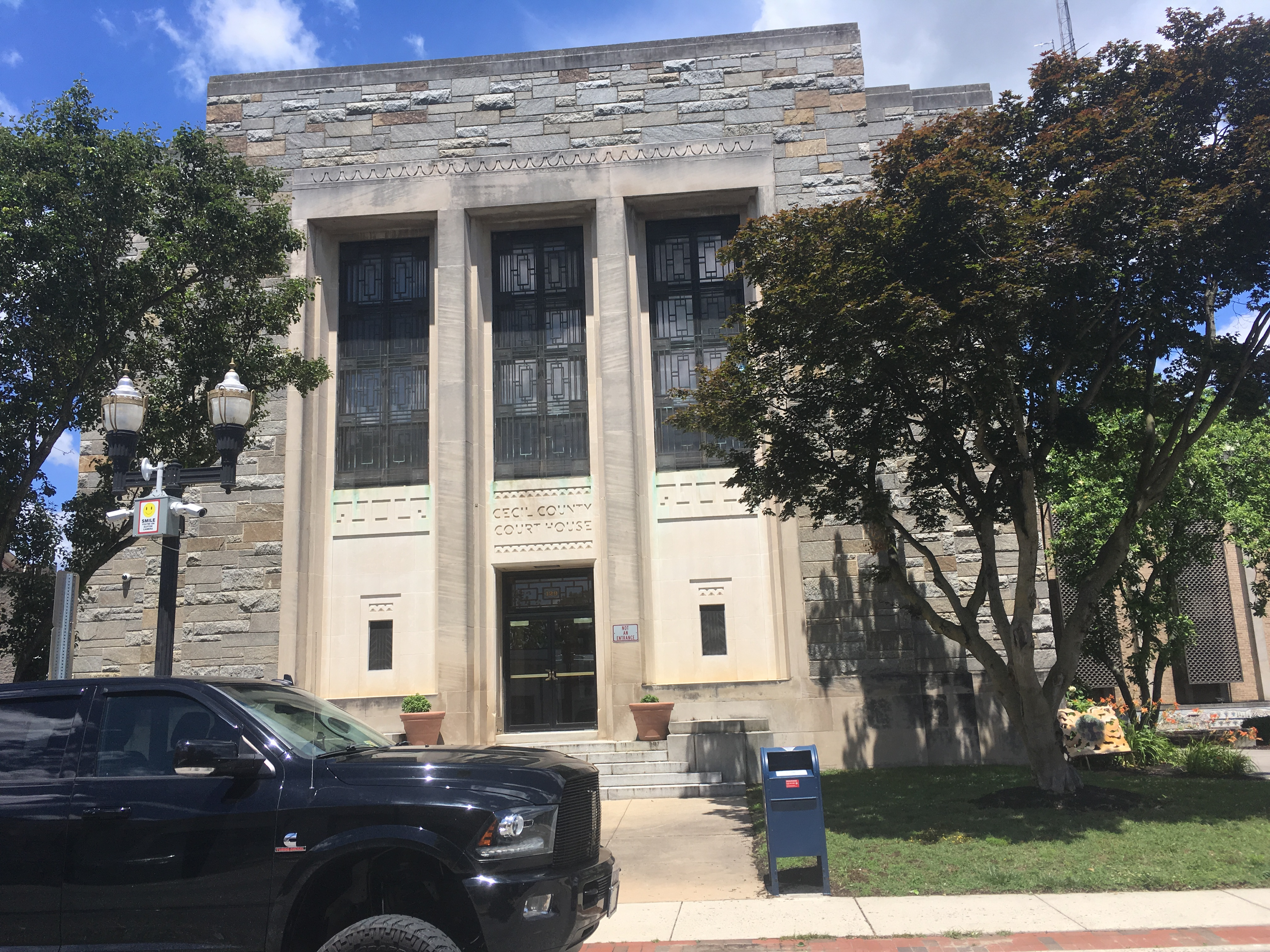
- Interactive map of the Cecil County Circuit Courthouse area

General information
- Location: 129 E. Main Street, Elkton, Maryland, United States of America
- Coordinates: 39.610°N 75.824°W
- Construction started: 1939
- Completed: 1940
- Client: Cecil County, Maryland

Technical details
- Size: 3 floors

The Cecil County Circuit Courthouse is located in Elkton, Maryland. The courthouse houses the chambers and courtrooms for the 4 judges of the Circuit Court for Cecil County, as well as the clerk's offices, jurors' assembly room, the law library and masters' offices. On Friday, January 3, 2014 Judge Brenda Sexton was sworn in as Cecil County's 4th Circuit Court Judge. She is filling a seat newly created by the Maryland legislature.

== History ==
The first courthouse in Elkton was completed in 1792. It was renovated in 1884 but by the early 1900s, county officials realized more room was needed and decided to build a new courthouse. This "new" courthouse was built in 1940 and is still in use today.
