= William A. Winder =

United States Army officer (1823–1903)

- Born: September 1823; Maryland, USA
- Died: 6 March 1903 (aged 79); Omaha, Nebraska, USA
- Spouse: Abby Rice Goodwin (m. 1851)
- Relatives: John H. Winder (father); William H. Winder (grandfather); Ichabod Goodwin (father-in-law)
- Military career
- Branch: US Army
- Service years: c. 1848 – 1866
- Rank: Captain
- Commands: Third Artillery
- Wars: Mexican-American War; American Civil War
- Other work: Physician, civil servant

Captain William Andrew Winder (born September 1823 – March 6, 1903) was a U.S. Army Commanding Officer of Fort Alcatraz (1861–64).

A native of Maryland, he served in the Army for eighteen years, having been promoted to lieutenant in the Mexican–American War, serving continuously until 1866. He was appointed second lieutenant, Third Artillery, March 24, 1848; first lieutenant, Third Artillery, August 22, 1853; and captain, Third Artillery, May 14, 1861 in command of Company G.

== Military career ==
Winder's career in the Army began in the Mexican–American War, where he served with distinction at the Battle of Buena Vista in February 1847. He was appointed second lieutenant shortly after and was on duty at Newport Barracks, Kentucky, from April 30 to September 28, 1848. He rejoined his regiment October 14, 1848; served at Fort Constitution, New Hampshire, to September 24, 1849; and in Florida to August 24, 1850. He was on sick leave to January 28, 1851; and again with company at Fort Constitution to September 21, 1852; at Jefferson Barracks Military Post, Missouri, to May 24, 1853; at Fort Preble, Maine; to October, 1853; en route to California, until wrecked on steamer at San Francisco, in January, 1854; at Fort Wood, New York, to April 15, 1854; en route to California to May 29, 1854; at San Diego, California, to November 4, 1857, at Fort Yuma, California to June 28, 1858. He was on recruiting service to June, 1860; awaiting orders to February 21, 1861.

At the outset of the American Civil War (1861-1865), he served from March 22, 1861 to May 30, 1861 with his company at Presidio, California, and at Alcatraz Island, California. At the beginning of the war, Albert Sidney Johnston was in command of the Department of the Pacific and Winder was in charge of Alcatraz. Later in Winder's life, he wrote in support of Johnston's character, stating that while Johnston did follow his state (Texas) into the Confederacy, Johnston was loyal until he submitted his resignation, and was not involved in agitation for an independent California. October 21, 1861, his company moved to Washington, D.C. where they stayed until January, 1862, serving with the Artillery Reserve of the Army of the Potomac. He then returned to command Alcatraz Island, until August 2, 1864. His organization of the defenses at that point were said to be the "most effective that could then be devised."

He then moved to Point San Jose', California, to August, 1865; at San Diego, California, to October 6, 1865; en route to the East to November 21, 1865; on recruiting service in New York to January 18, 1866, and on leave until he resigned, October 18, 1866. In October 1866, he tendered his resignation, believing that Edwin Stanton, the "Secretary of War was unfriendly to him." In January 1867, he applied to the President for reinstatement, stating, "My resignation was tendered while under the impression that the honorable Secretary of War was unfriendly toward me." The vacancy made by his resignation had been filled and it was beyond the legal power of the President to reappoint him in his former grade.

== Later career ==
After resigning, he lived in California where he worked as a physician. In 1894 while living in San Diego, Winder took a position as an agent of Indian affairs in the United States Department of the Interior, first to be a special agent to allot lands at the Round Valley Reservation in California. In 1894, he became allotting agent for the Rosebud Indian Reservation, a position he held until his death in 1903.

== Family ==
Winder was the son of John H. Winder, who was a career officer in the US Army until the American Civil War (1861–1865), when he joined the Confederates and became a general. Winder had a half-brother, named William S. Winder, who was an attorney. Winder's grandfather was William H. Winder, a general in the U.S. Army in the war of 1812. In 1851, Winder married Abby Rice Goodwin (February 1829 - May 9, 1906) of Portsmouth, New Hampshire, the daughter of New Hampshire governor, Ichabod Goodwin. Another of Goodwin's daughters married Admiral George Dewey. Their son, William Winder, was an officer in the US Navy and served on the USS Raleigh in the Battle of Manila Bay during the Spanish–American War.

Winder died of cancer at Millard Hospital in Omaha, Nebraska on Friday, March 6, 1903. His body was returned to Portsmouth, New Hampshire for burial.
