= Fort Defiance (Maryland) =

Coordinates: 39°35′31.39″N 75°51′23.77″W

Fort Defiance was an earthworks fortification on the western bank of the Elk River in northern Maryland. The fort was in use from 1813 to 1815 during the War of 1812 and repelled British forces on April 29, 1813. Today, there is a historical marker located approximately 660 feet (200 m) northwest of the original site of the fort.

== See also ==
- List of forts in Maryland
