= Red Point, Maryland =

Coordinates: 39.5284490°N 75.9807794°W

Red Point is an unincorporated community located just off Maryland Route 272 south of North East, Maryland, United States. It is near Elk Neck State Park, where the North East River enters the Chesapeake Bay.

The neighborhood is a mix of seasonal and full-time residents. In the past several years the residents have worked to improve the area, paving and patching streets, renovating existing homes, and even tearing down some older cottages and replacing them with newly constructed homes. Several members of the community have been investing time, effort and money into trying to decrease the erosion of the banks into the Chesapeake Bay. Situated on the bay with its private beach, boat ramp and pier provides frequent sightings of Bald Eagles, Osprey and herons feeding on the fish.

The community association sponsors an annual Fourth of July picnic complete with a pig roast and pot luck lunch. Several residents work together over the winter to construct a quilt that is raffled off at the picnic to raise money for community projects. Many neighborhood vehicles display the oval "RP" (Red Point) stickers as a symbol of pride in the community. The preferred method of transportation during warm weather months is golf carts, especially for carrying people and gear to the beach.

- U.S. Geological Survey Geographic Names Information System: Red Point, Maryland
