= Wicomico County Courthouses =

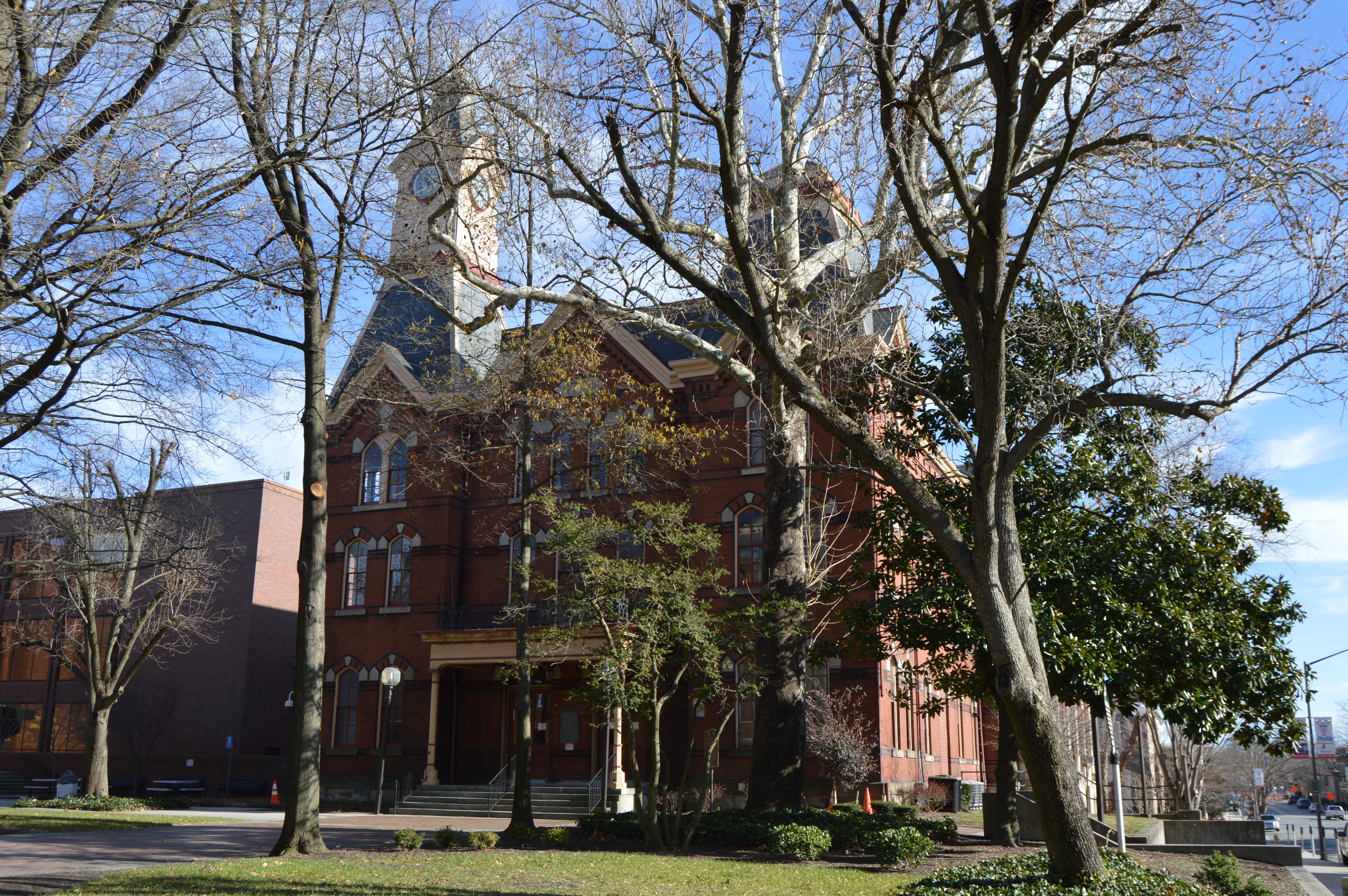
Circuit Court

Wicomico County, Maryland, is served by two courthouses, both located in the county seat of Salisbury.

The Wicomico County Circuit Court, where serious criminal cases and major civil cases are tried, is located at 101 North Division Street (38.3658°N 75.6000°W). The Circuit Court hears all family law matters which include divorce, custody, child support, and visitation. The court also hears matters such as guardianship, name changes, juvenile matters, and all jury trials. Civil matters over $5,000 can be filed in the Circuit Court. Civil matters over $30,000 must be filed in the Circuit Court. Civil cases can elect to have a jury trial if the claim is for $15,000 or more.

The Wicomico County Circuit Court has four judges and one magistrate. Judge S. James Sarbanes is the Administrative Judge. Judges Kathleen Leonard Beckstead, Matthew A. Maciarello, and Karen M. Dean are Associate Judges. Connie G. Marvel is the Magistrate. A magistrate can hear cases and make recommendations but does not have the same powers and authority of a judge.

The county's District Court building, known as the W. Paul Martin District Court and Multi-Service Center, is located at 201 Baptist Street (38.3666°N 75.5975°W). This is where such matters as traffic violations, misdemeanor criminal cases, and civil cases are heard. Civil cases include small claims (under $5,000), large claims ($5,001-$30,0000), landlord-tenant issues, replevin (return of property), peace and protective orders

The Wicomico County District Court has two full-time judges, David B Martz and Abigail H Marsh. Judges from surrounding counties frequently visit allowing three courtrooms to operate.
