= Maryland Route 342 =

State highway in Maryland, United States

Maryland Route 342
- St. Augustine Road
- Maryland Route 342 highlighted in red

Route information
- Maintained by MDSHA
- Length: 2.82 mi (4.54 km)
- Existed: 1941–present

Major junctions
- South end: MD 310 at St. Augustine
- North end: MD 537 in Chesapeake City

Location
- Country: United States
- State: Maryland
- Counties: Cecil

Highway system
- Maryland highway system; Interstate; US; State; Scenic Byways
← MD 341	→ MD 343

Maryland Route 342 (MD 342) is a state highway in the U.S. state of Maryland. Known as St. Augustine Road, the highway runs 2.82 miles (4.54 km) from MD 310 at St. Augustine north to unsigned MD 537 in Chesapeake City in southern Cecil County. MD 342 was constructed in its entirety by 1915.

== Route description ==
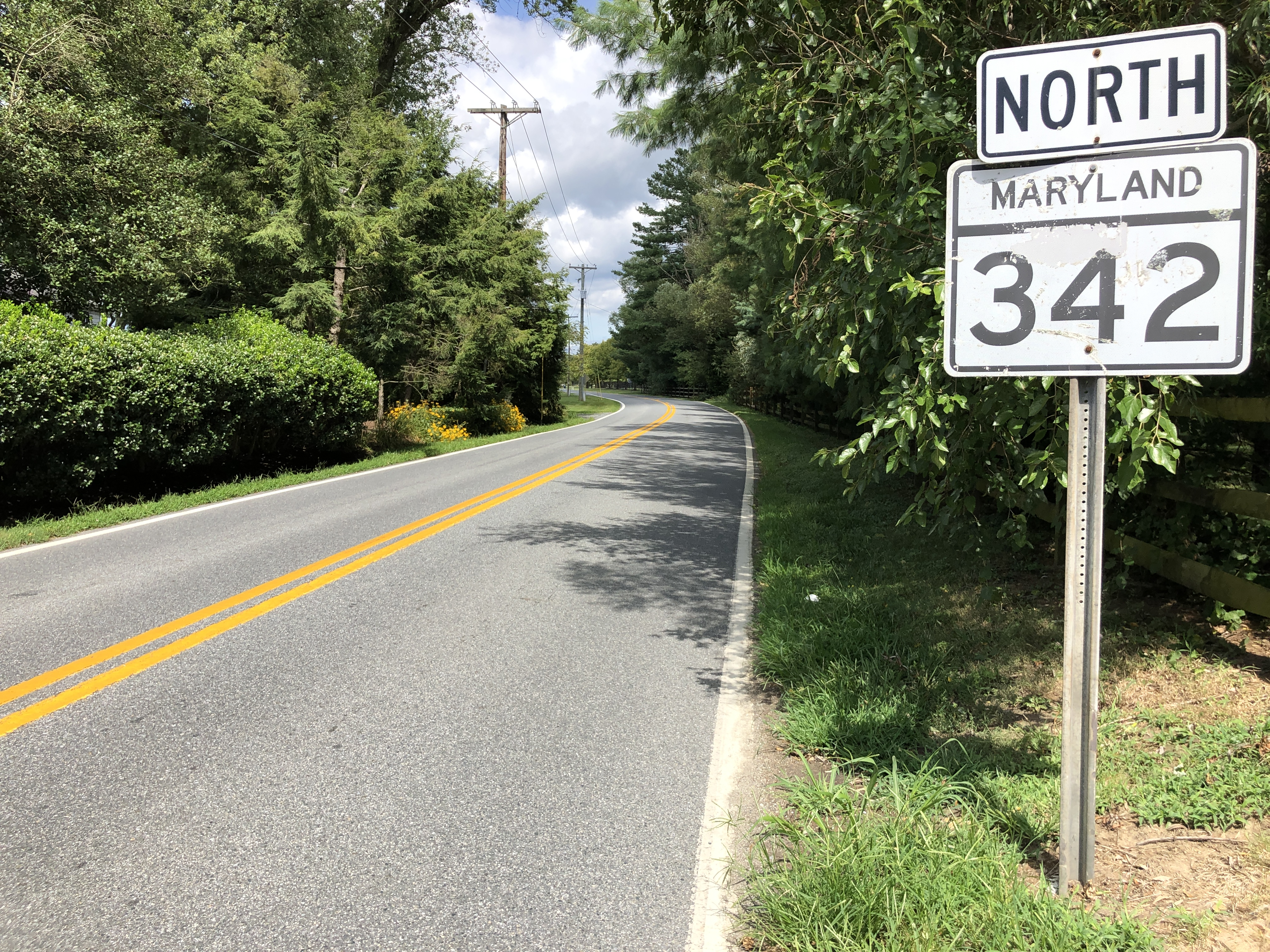
View north along MD 342 at MD 310 in St. Augustine

MD 342 begins at an intersection with MD 310 (Cayots Corner Road) at the hamlet of St. Augustine. The two-lane undivided highway runs through rural areas and heads northeast, makes a right-angle turn to the northwest, curves to the west, then takes a sharp turn to the north. The state highway enters the town of Chesapeake City and intersects an unnamed road (unsigned MD 537D) that leads west to an interchange with MD 213 at the southern end of the Chesapeake City Bridge over the Chesapeake & Delaware Canal. MD 342 continues to its northern terminus at an oblique junction with George Street, which is unsigned MD 537C and leads north to the western terminus of MD 286 in the South Chesapeake City Historic District.

== History ==
St. Augustine Road was paved as a macadam road from George Street to the right-angle turn by 1910. The remainder of the road to St. Augustine and MD 310 east of St. Augustine were constructed as a 12-foot-wide (3.7 m) macadam road by Cecil County with state aid by 1915. MD 342 was resurfaced with bituminous concrete in 1988.

== Junction list ==
The entire route is in Cecil County.

Location	mi	km	Destinations	Notes
St. Augustine	0.00	0.00	MD 310 (Cayots Corner Road)	Southern terminus
Chesapeake City	2.74	4.41	MD 537 to MD 213 – Elkton, Cecilton	Officially unsigned MD 537D
Chesapeake City	2.82	4.54	MD 537 (George Street) to MD 286	Northern terminus; officially unsigned MD 537C
1.000 mi = 1.609 km; 1.000 km = 0.621 mi
