= Maryland Route 537 =

Highway in Maryland

Maryland Route 537

Route information
- Maintained by MDSHA
- Existed: 1949–present

Location
- Country: United States
- State: Maryland
- Counties: Cecil

Highway system
- Maryland highway system; Interstate; US; State; Scenic Byways
← MD 535	→ MD 542

Maryland Route 537 (MD 537) is a collection of unsigned state highways in the U.S. state of Maryland. These two existing highways and two former sections of state highway are segments of the old alignment of U.S. Route 213 (US 213), which is now MD 213, in Chesapeake City in southern Cecil County. Some of the roads that became segments of MD 537 were constructed in the mid-1910s as part of the original state road between Elkton and Cecilton. Other portions of MD 537 were part of the approach roads to a bridge across the Chesapeake & Delaware Canal that was built in the mid-1920s and destroyed in 1942. After the modern Chesapeake City Bridge and its approach roads were completed in 1949, US 213 was moved to the new bridge and approach roads and MD 537 was assigned to the bypassed sections of US 213. Much of MD 537 outside of Chesapeake City was transferred to county maintenance in the late 1950s. In 2015, the remaining section of MD 537 north of the canal was turned over to municipal maintenance.

== Route description ==
There are two existing sections of MD 537 and two former sections of the highway. MD 537A and MD 537B were north of the Chesapeake & Delaware Canal, and MD 537C and MD 537D are south of the canal. This description runs north to south starting from the north end of the Chesapeake City area:

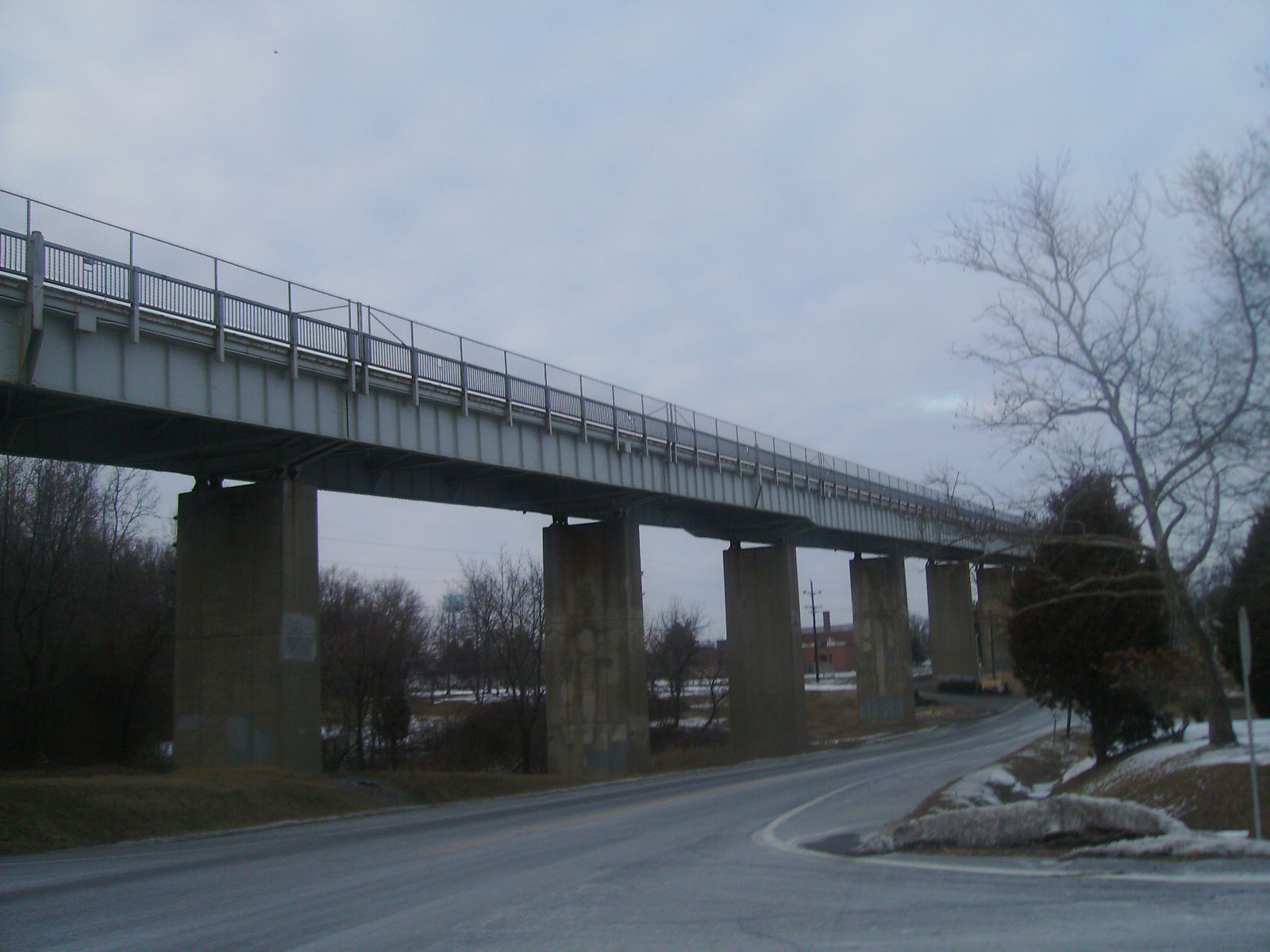
MD 537C and MD 213 in Chesapeake City

- MD 537A ran 1.61 miles (2.59 km) between a pair of intersections with US 213 (Augustine Herman Highway), between which was a third intersection with the highway, north of Chesapeake City. The highway split from the U.S. Highway on a tangent along Knights Corner Road. MD 537A turned west onto Elk Forest Road, crossed to the west side of US 213, and turned south onto Spears Hill Road. The highway followed that road to its southern terminus at US 213 north of Long Creek.
- MD 537B began at MD 285, which heads east along Biddle Street toward Delaware and north along Lock Street toward Elkton. The highway headed south along Lock Street for 0.06 miles (0.097 km) to Canal Road along the Chesapeake & Delaware Canal. The 0.01 miles (0.016 km) of MD 537B closest to the canal was maintained by the U.S. Army Corps of Engineers instead of the Maryland State Highway Administration beginning in 2014 after the discovery that the latter had quitclaimed the segment to the former in 1965. MD 537B originally followed Lock Street a further 0.57 miles (0.92 km) out of the town limits to MD 213 at the north end of the Chesapeake City Bridge along what is now MD 285.

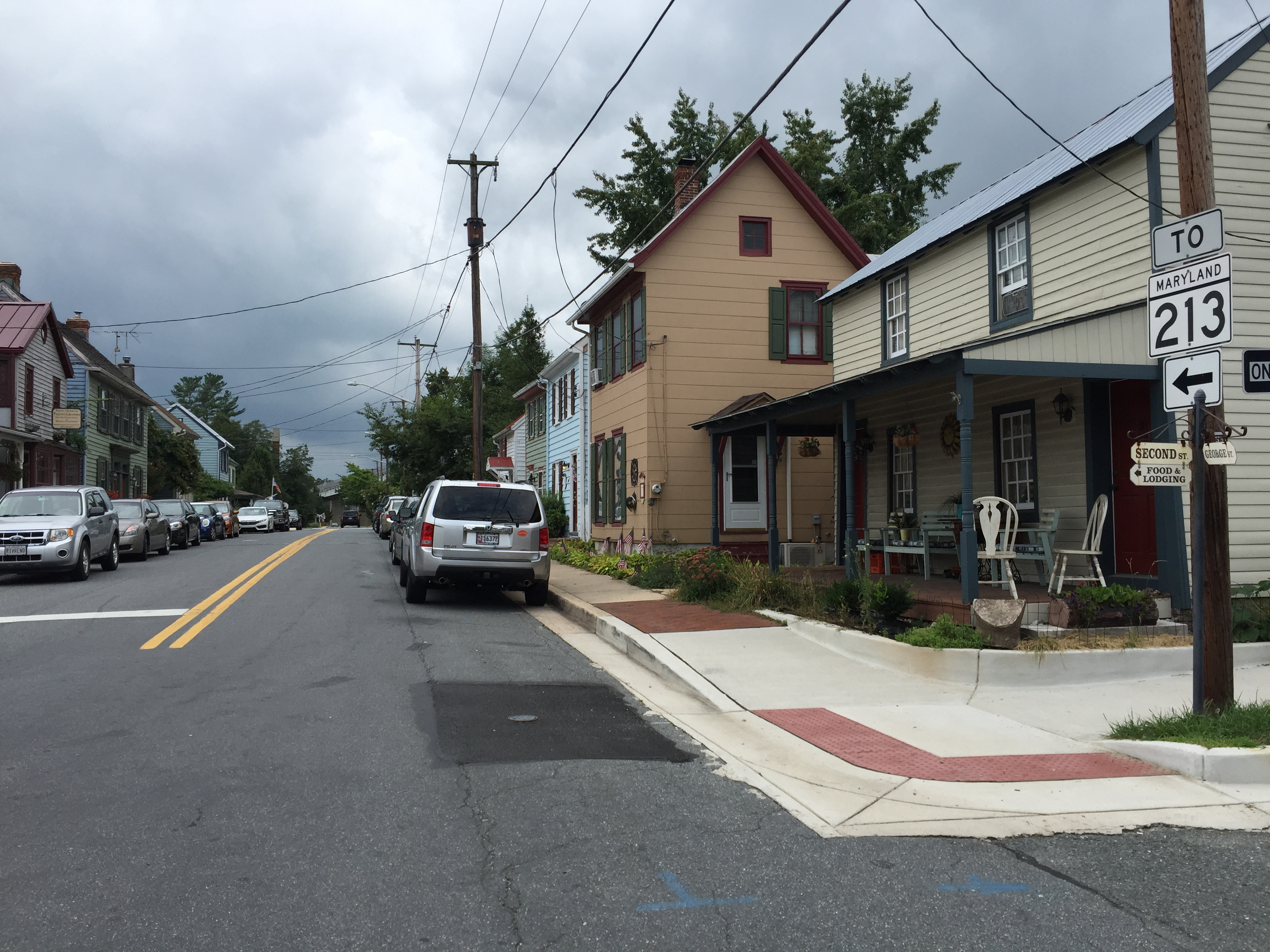
View south at the north end of MD 537C at MD 286 in Chesapeake City

- MD 537C runs 0.49 miles (0.79 km) from the Chesapeake & Delaware Canal south to MD 213. The highway begins at a dead-end at the canal just north of 1st Street in the South Chesapeake City Historic District. MD 537C follows George Street through an intersection with the western end of MD 286 (2nd Street). The highway has an acute junction with the northern end of MD 342 (St. Augustine Road) and an orthogonal intersection with MD 537D. South of MD 537D, MD 537C reaches its southern terminus at right-in/right-out interchange ramps with northbound MD 213 at the south end of the Chesapeake City Bridge at the Chesapeake City town limit.
- MD 537D, which has a length of 0.25 miles (0.40 km), begins at MD 342 and heads west as an unnamed road through an intersection with MD 537C. The highway passes under the Chesapeake City Bridge and curves south to an intersection with the right-in/right-out interchange ramps with southbound MD 213. MD 537D reaches its southern terminus 0.02 miles (0.032 km) south of the town limit of Chesapeake City. The roadway continues as county-maintained Basil Avenue. MD 537D formerly continued south 0.86 miles (1.38 km) along Basil Avenue to US 213 at Bohemia Manor High School.

== History ==
The Cecilton–Elkton highway was one of the original state roads the Maryland State Roads Commission designated for improvement in 1909. The portion of the highway from Elkton to the north town limit of Chesapeake City was constructed as a 14-foot-wide (4.3 m) macadam road between 1911 and 1914. The highway through Chesapeake City and south toward Cecilton was completed as a 14-foot-wide (4.3 m) concrete road in 1915. At that time, the main highway from the north used Knights Corner Road, Elk Forest Road, and Spears Hill Road, entered Chesapeake City along Hemphill Street, crossed the Chesapeake & Delaware Canal on a one-lane bridge, turned west and crossed Back Creek on a wooden bridge, turned south onto Bohemia Street in South Chesapeake City, turned west onto Third Street, and turned south onto George Street to the south end of town, from which the highway followed Basil Avenue toward Cecilton.

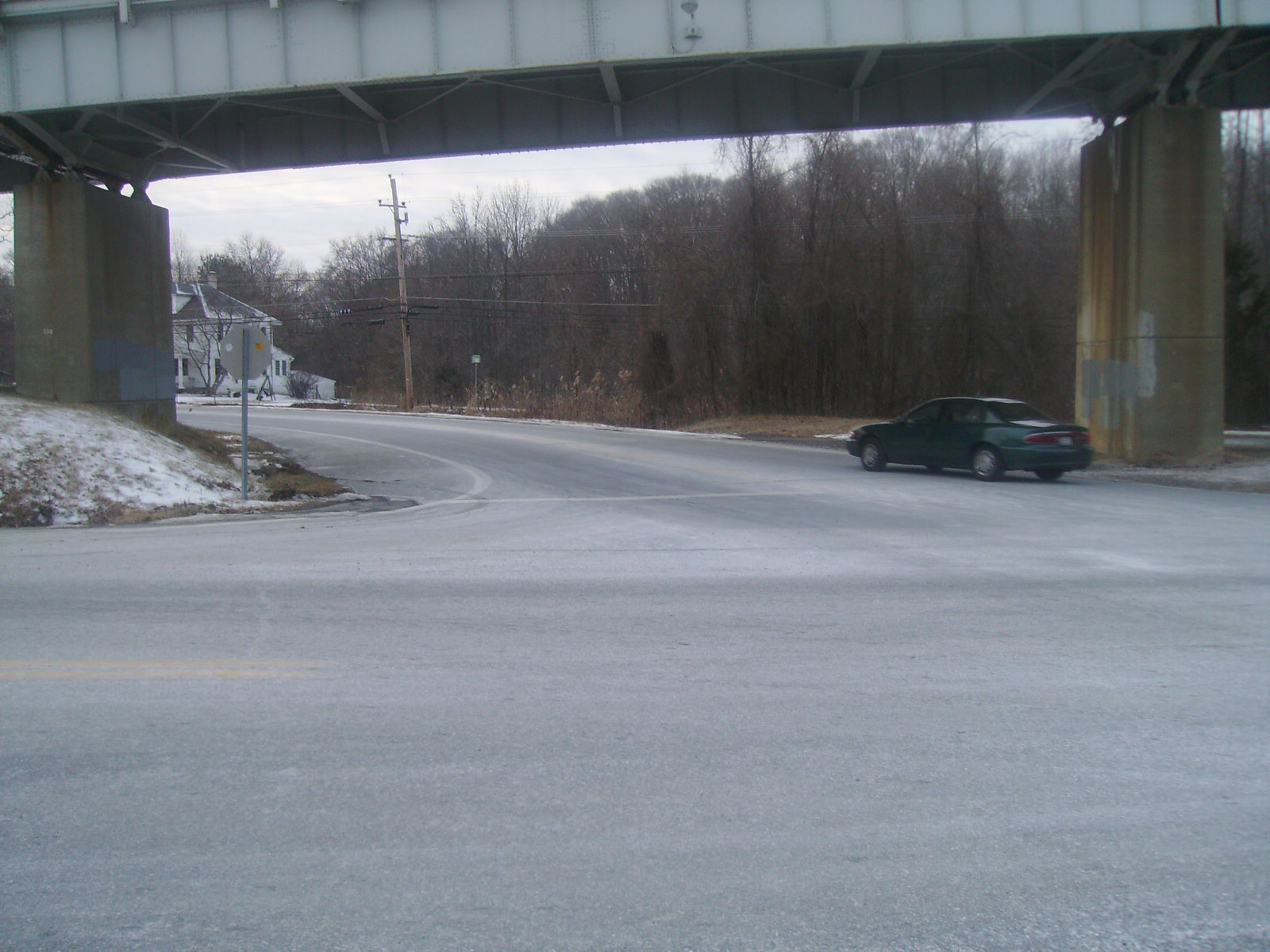
MD 537D from MD 537C in Chesapeake City

In the 1920s, the U.S. Army Corps of Engineers widened, straightened, and deepened the canal. As part of their work, the agency constructed a vertical lift bridge across the canal. Between 1924 and 1926, the Maryland State Roads Commission constructed approaches to the new bridge on both sides of the expanded canal, eliminating two narrow and dangerous bridges and four right-angle turns in Chesapeake City. The new route along George Street and Lock Street, which became part of US 213 in 1927 and is now MD 285 and MD 537, entirely bypassed what is now MD 284. After the tanker Franz Klasen' destroyed the vertical lift bridge on July 28, 1942, the Maryland State Roads Commission established a ferry service across the canal. Between 1946 and 1949, the U.S. Army Corps of Engineers constructed the present tied arch Chesapeake City Bridge and new approach roads to the bridge.

US 213 was moved to the new Chesapeake City Bridge, and MD 537 was assigned to the bypassed portions of highway approaching and within Chesapeake City. On May 8, 1958, the Maryland State Roads Commission and Cecil County signed a road transfer agreement to turn maintenance of the approach roads outside the town of Chesapeake City to county maintenance. These roads included all of MD 537A, most of MD 537D, and much of MD 537B. The portion of MD 537B from US 213 to the north town limit was returned to state maintenance through an August 22, 1961, road transfer agreement. All three segments of MD 537 were resurfaced with bituminous concrete in 1976. The intersection of MD 537B and MD 284 was transformed from a tangent intersection to the present orthogonal intersection in 1982. The following year, the portion of MD 537B between MD 213 and MD 285's then western terminus at the intersection of Biddle and Lock streets was renumbered as an extension of MD 285. The remainder of MD 537B not maintained by the U.S. Army Corps of Engineers was transferred to Chesapeake City in 2015.

== Junction lists ==
The route progression in these tables is south to north.

=== MD 537C ===
The entire route is in Chesapeake City, Cecil County.

mi	km	Destinations	Notes
0.00	0.00	MD 213 north (Augustine Herman Highway) – Elkton	Southern terminus of MD 537C; Right-in/right-out interchange with northbound MD 213
0.15	0.24	MD 537 to MD 213 south / MD 342 – Cecilton	Unsigned MD 537D
0.22	0.35	MD 342 south (St. Augustine Road) – St. Augustine	
0.45	0.72	MD 286 east (2nd Street)	
0.49	0.79	End of highway at Chesapeake & Delaware Canal	Northern terminus of MD 537C
1.000 mi = 1.609 km; 1.000 km = 0.621 mi

=== MD 537D ===
The entire route is in Chesapeake City, Cecil County.

mi	km	Destinations	Notes
0.00	0.00	Basil Avenue south	Southern terminus of MD 537D
0.07	0.11	MD 213 south (Augustine Herman Highway) – Cecilton	Right-in/right-out interchange with southbound MD 213
0.21	0.34	MD 537 (George Street) to MD 213 north / MD 286 – Elkton	Unsigned MD 537C
0.25	0.40	MD 342 (St. Augustine Road) – St. Augustine	Northern terminus of MD 537D
1.000 mi = 1.609 km; 1.000 km = 0.621 mi
