= List of highways numbered 285 =

The following highways are numbered 285:

== Brazil ==
- BR-285

== Canada ==
- Manitoba Provincial Road 285
- Quebec Route 285

== Ireland ==
- R285 regional road

== Japan ==
- Japan National Route 285

== United States ==
- Interstate 285 (multiple highways)
- U.S. Route 285
- Alabama State Route 285
- California State Route 285 (former)
- Florida State Road 285
- Georgia State Route 285
- Iowa Highway 285 (former)
- K-285 (Kansas highway)
- Kentucky Route 285
- Maryland Route 285
- Montana Secondary Highway 285
- New York State Route 285 (former)
- Ohio State Route 285
- Pennsylvania Route 285
- Tennessee State Route 285
- Texas State Highway 285
  - Texas State Highway Loop 285
  - Farm to Market Road 285 (Texas)
- Utah State Route 285
- Virginia State Route 285
- Washington State Route 285

Preceded by 284	Lists of highways 285	Succeeded by 286
