= List of highways numbered 286 =

The following highways are numbered 286:

== Japan ==
- Japan National Route 286

== United States ==
- Arizona State Route 286
- Connecticut Route 286
- Delaware Route 286
- Georgia State Route 286
- Iowa Highway 286 (former)
- Kentucky Route 286
- Maryland Route 286
- Massachusetts Route 286
- Minnesota State Highway 286
- Montana Secondary Highway 286
- New Hampshire Route 286
- New Mexico State Road 286
- New York State Route 286
- Ohio State Route 286
- Pennsylvania Route 286
- Tennessee State Route 286
- Texas State Highway 286
  - Texas State Highway Loop 286
  - Farm to Market Road 286 (former)
- Utah State Route 286
- Virginia State Route 286

Preceded by 285	Lists of highways 286	Succeeded by 287
