= Maryland Route 285 =

Highway in Maryland

Maryland Route 285
- Maryland Route 285 highlighted in red

Route information
- Maintained by MDSHA
- Length: 2.43 mi (3.91 km)
- Existed: 1930–present

Major junctions
- West end: MD 213 near Chesapeake City
- MD 284 in Chesapeake City
- East end: Chesapeake City Road at the Delaware state line near Chesapeake City

Location
- Country: United States
- State: Maryland
- Counties: Cecil

Highway system
- Maryland highway system; Interstate; US; State; Scenic Byways
← MD 284	→ MD 286

Maryland Route 285 (MD 285) is a state highway in the U.S. state of Maryland. The highway runs 2.43 miles (3.91 km) from MD 213 east through Chesapeake City to the Delaware state line in southern Cecil County. MD 285 consists of two sections. The first section parallels the north side of the Chesapeake & Delaware Canal; this portion was constructed around 1930. The other segment included sections of the main north–south highway through Chesapeake City, U.S. Route 213 (US 213). Sections of the main highway were constructed in the mid-1910s and then in the mid-1920s concurrent with the second bridge across the canal. After US 213 was moved to MD 213's present course using the Chesapeake City Bridge in 1949, the old highway became part of MD 537. That portion of MD 537 was replaced by an extension of MD 285 to MD 213 in 1983.

== Route description ==
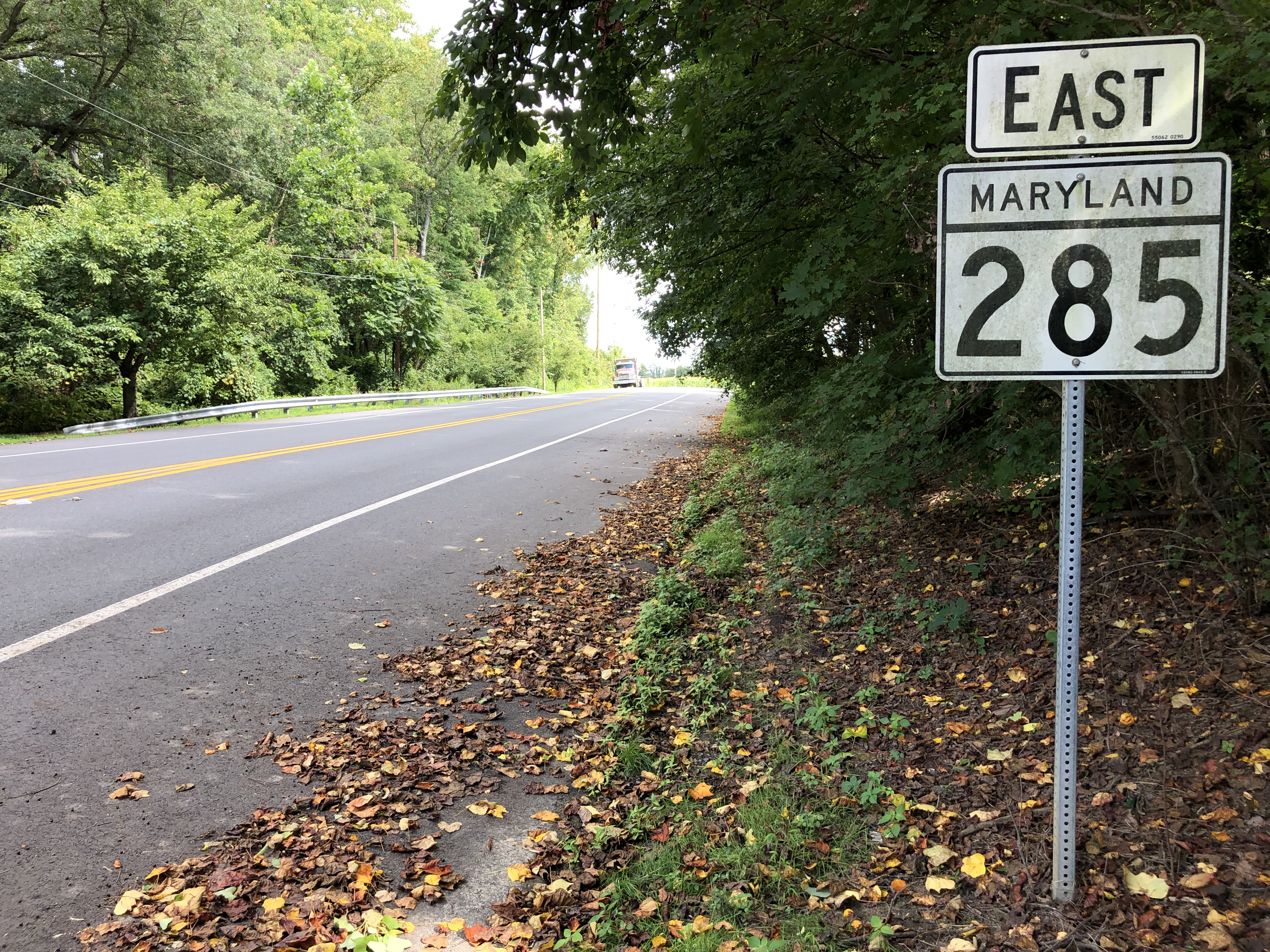
MD 285 eastbound past MD 213 just before entering Chesapeake City

MD 285 begins at an intersection with MD 213 (Augustine Herman Highway) at the north end of the Chesapeake City Bridge. The highway heads east as two-lane undivided Lock Street, which curves south at county-maintained Hemphill Street. MD 285 curves to the southwest at its junction with the north end of MD 284 (Hemphill Street) and enters the town of Chesapeake City. The highway continues to Biddle Street, onto which the route turns east; Lock Street continues south to the Chesapeake & Delaware Canal. MD 285 meets the southern end of MD 284 (Hemphill Street) and passes through an S-curve before leaving the town. The route parallels the canal to the north and intersects Knights Corner Road before reaching its eastern terminus at the Delaware state line, from which the road continues as Chesapeake City Road.

== History ==
MD 285 originally only included Biddle Street. The highway was paved as a 18-foot-wide (5.5 m) concrete road from Lock Street to the Delaware state line between 1928 and 1930. The Lock Street portion of MD 285 was constructed over multiple steps and assigned multiple designations as part of the Cecilton–Elkton highway, which was one of the original state roads the Maryland State Roads Commission designated for improvement in 1909. The portion of the highway from Elkton to the north town limit of Chesapeake City, including both segments of Hemphill Street and the stretch of MD 285 between them, was constructed as a 14-foot-wide (4.3 m) macadam road between 1911 and 1914. At that time, the main highway from the north followed Hemphill Street through the northern half of Chesapeake City and crossed the Chesapeake & Delaware Canal on a one-lane bridge.

In the 1920s, the U.S. Army Corps of Engineers widened, straightened, and deepened the canal. As part of their work, the agency constructed a vertical lift bridge across the canal. Between 1924 and 1926, the Maryland State Roads Commission constructed approaches to the new bridge on both sides of the expanded canal, eliminating two narrow and dangerous bridges and four right-angle turns in Chesapeake City. The new route along the part of Lock Street south of Hemphill Street became part of US 213 in 1927. After the tanker Franz Klasen destroyed the vertical lift bridge on July 28, 1942, the U.S. Army Corps of Engineers constructed the present tied arch Chesapeake City Bridge and new approach roads to the bridge between 1946 and 1949. US 213 was moved to the new Chesapeake City Bridge, and MD 537B was assigned to the bypassed portion of highway between the canal and county-maintained Hemphill Street, as well as the piece of Lock Street that connected with US 213.

On May 8, 1958, the Maryland State Roads Commission and Cecil County signed a road transfer agreement to turn maintenance of MD 537B outside the town of Chesapeake City to county maintenance. However, the portion of MD 537B from US 213 to the north town limit was returned to state maintenance through an August 22, 1961, road transfer agreement. MD 285 and MD 537B were resurfaced with bituminous concrete in 1971 and 1976, respectively. The intersection of MD 537B and MD 284 was transformed from a tangent intersection to the present orthogonal intersection in 1982. The following year, the portion of MD 537B between MD 213 and the intersection of Biddle and Lock streets was renumbered as an extension of MD 285.

== Junction list ==
The entire route is in Cecil County.

Location	mi	km	Destinations	Notes
	0.00	0.00	MD 213 (Augustine Herman Highway) – Elkton, Cecilton	Western terminus
Chesapeake City	0.29	0.47	MD 284 south (Hemphill Street)	Northern terminus of MD 284
Chesapeake City	0.57	0.92	Biddle Street west / Lock Street south	MD 285 turns east onto Biddle Street; Lock Street is former unsigned MD 537B
Chesapeake City	0.76	1.22	MD 284 north (Hemphill Street)	Southern terminus of MD 284
	2.43	3.91	Chesapeake City Road east	Delaware state line; eastern terminus
1.000 mi = 1.609 km; 1.000 km = 0.621 mi
