= Maryland Route 310 =

State highway in Maryland, United States

Maryland Route 310
- Cayots Corner Road
- Maryland Route 310 highlighted in red

Route information
- Maintained by MDSHA
- Length: 3.96 mi (6.37 km)
- Existed: 1927–present

Major junctions
- West end: MD 213 at Cayots
- MD 342 at St. Augustine
- East end: Churchtown Road at the Delaware state line near St. Augustine

Location
- Country: United States
- State: Maryland
- Counties: Cecil

Highway system
- Maryland highway system; Interstate; US; State; Scenic Byways
| ← MD 309 | → MD 311 |

Maryland Route 310 (MD 310) is a state highway in the U.S. state of Maryland. Known as Cayots Corner Road, the highway runs 3.96 miles (6.37 km) from MD 213 at Cayots east to the Delaware state line east of St. Augustine in southern Cecil County. MD 310 was built east of St. Augustine by 1921 and west to what was then U.S. Route 213 (US 213) in the early 1940s. MD 310 was extended west when US 213 was relocated at Cayots in the early 1950s.

== Route description ==
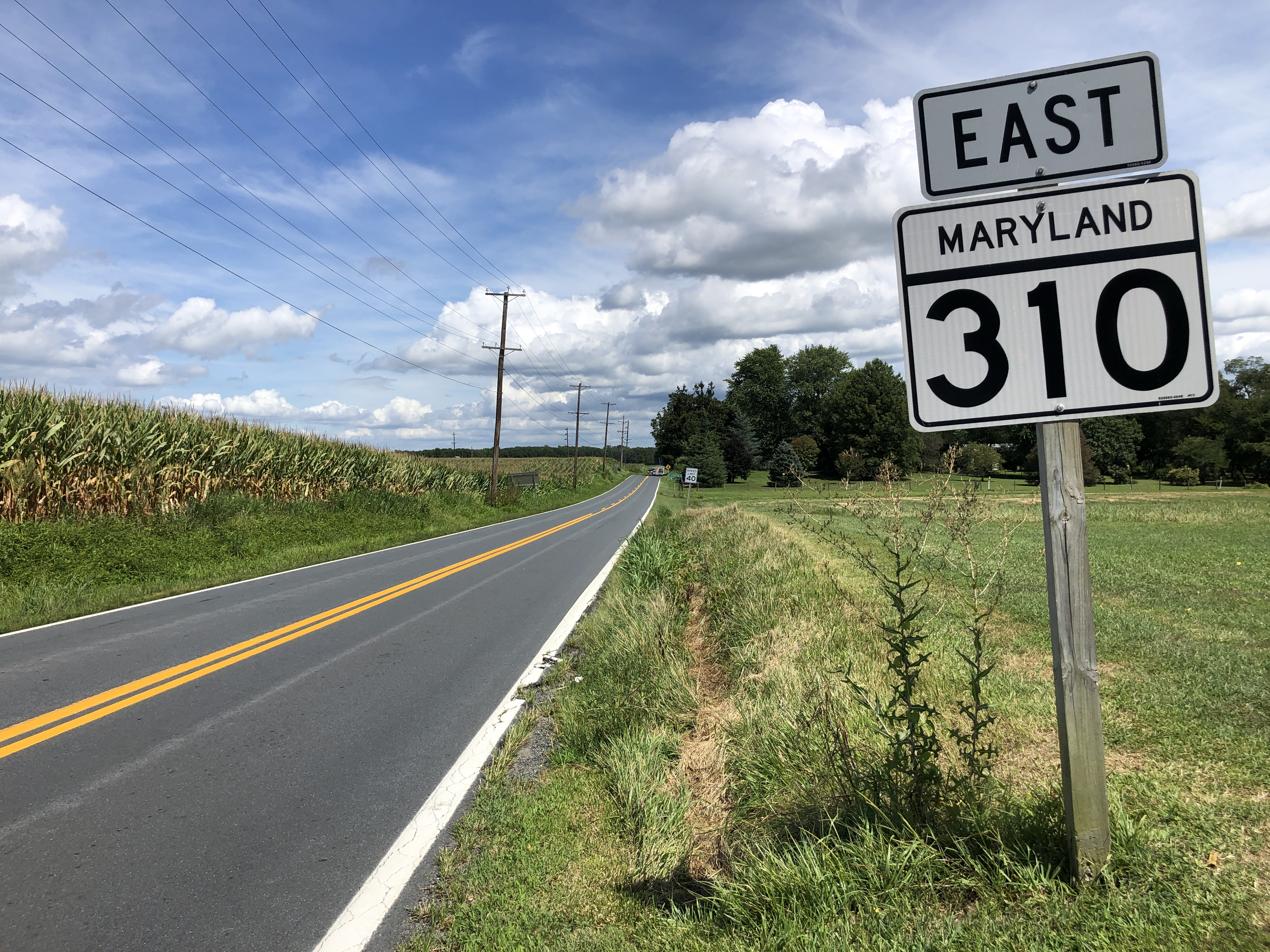
View east along MD 310 at MD 213 in Cayots

MD 310 begins at an intersection with MD 213 (Augustine Herman Highway) opposite Town Point Road in the hamlet of Cayots. The state highway heads east as a two-lane undivided road past Cayots Corner Road Spur, which heads north to another intersection with MD 213. MD 310 runs through farmland with some woods and homes as it follows the height of land between creeks that flow north into the Elk River and Back Creek and south into the Bohemia River. The highway intersects the southern terminus of MD 342 (St. Augustine Road) in the hamlet of St. Augustine. MD 310 reaches its eastern terminus just east of Old Telegraph Road at the Delaware state line. The highway continues east as Churchtown Road, which leads toward the village of Mount Pleasant.

== History ==
Cecil County paved what is now MD 310—which has also been known as St. Augustine Road and Mount Pleasant Road—east of St. Augustine as a macadam road with state aid by 1915. The Maryland State Roads Commission removed an objectionable curve just east of Cayots in 1924. The remainder of the Cayots–St. Augustine section of MD 310 was improved between 1940 and 1942. MD 310's western terminus was originally at the intersection of MD 310 and what is now Cayots Corner Road Spur, where US 213 had a right-angle turn. After US 213 was relocated at Cayots to eliminate the turn in 1951, MD 310 was extended west to its present terminus. The highway was surfaced with bituminous concrete from Cayots to St. Augustine in 1979.

== Junction list ==
The entire route is in Cecil County.

| Location | mi | km | Destinations | Notes |
|---|---|---|---|---|
| Cayots | 0.00 | 0.00 | MD 213 (Augustine Herman Highway) – Cecilton, Chesapeake City | Western terminus |
| St. Augustine | 2.16 | 3.48 | MD 342 north (St. Augustine Road) – Chesapeake City | Southern terminus of MD 342 |
| | 3.96 | 6.37 | Churchtown Road east – Mount Pleasant | Delaware state line; eastern terminus |
1.000 mi = 1.609 km; 1.000 km = 0.621 mi

== Auxiliary route ==
MD 310A was the designation for Cayots Corner Road Spur, which ran 0.16 miles (0.26 km) from MD 310 north to MD 213 at Cayots. The highway was originally part of US 213; MD 310A was assigned to the spur after the U.S. Highway was relocated at Cayots in 1951. MD 310A was transferred from state to county maintenance through a December 27, 1979, road transfer agreement.
