= List of highways numbered 287 =

Route 287 or Highway 287 may refer to:

== Brazil ==
- BR-287

== Canada ==
- Manitoba Provincial Road 287
- Quebec Route 287

== Japan ==
- Japan National Route 287

== United States ==
- Interstate 287
- U.S. Route 287
- Alabama State Route 287
  - County Route 287 (DeKalb County, Alabama)
  - County Route 287 (Jackson County, Alabama)
  - County Route 287 (Lauderdale County, Alabama)
  - County Route 287 (Winston County, Alabama)
- County Route 287 (Calhoun County, Arkansas)
- Arizona State Route 287
- Connecticut Route 287
- Georgia State Route 287 (former)
  - County Route 287 (Bryan County, Georgia)
  - County Route 287 (Dooly County, Georgia)
  - County Route 287 (Laurens County, Georgia)
  - County Route 287 (Tattnall County, Georgia)
- Iowa Highway 287 (former)
- Kentucky Route 287
- Maryland Route 287
- Minnesota State Highway 287
- County Route 287 (Alcorn County, Mississippi)
  - County Route 287 (Clarke County, Mississippi)
  - County Route 287 (Pontotoc County, Mississippi)
  - County Route 287 (Tishomingo County, Mississippi)
  - County Route 287 (Union County, Mississippi)
- County Route 287 (New Madrid County, Missouri)
  - County Route 287 (Pemiscot County, Missouri)
  - County Route 287 (Stoddard County, Missouri)
- Montana Highway 287
- New York State Route 287 (former)
- Ohio State Route 287
- Pennsylvania Route 287
- Tennessee State Route 287
- Texas State Highway 287 (former proposed)
  - Texas State Highway Loop 287
  - Farm to Market Road 287 (Texas)
  - County Route 287 (Angelina County, Texas)
  - County Route 287 (Leon County, Texas)
  - County Route 287 (San Augustine County, Texas)
  - County Route 287 (Smith County, Texas)
- Utah State Route 287
- Virginia State Route 287

Preceded by 286	Lists of highways 287	Succeeded by 288
