= Greenfields (Cecilton, Maryland) =

Historic house in Maryland, United States

- U.S. National Register of Historic Places
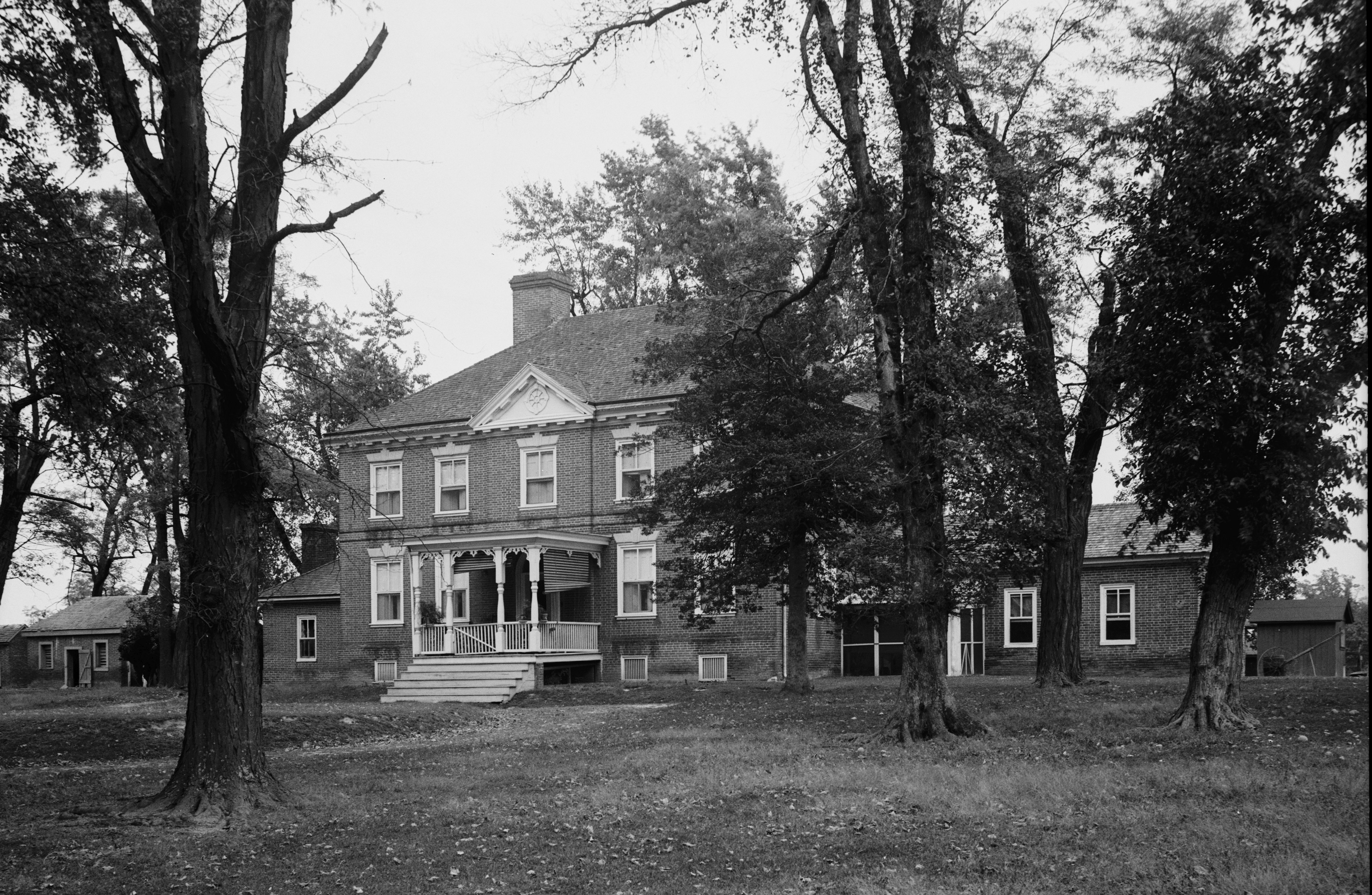
- Greenfields, HABS Photo, October 1936

- Location within Maryland Location within the United States
- Location: South of Cecilton at 6840 Augustine Herman Highway (Maryland Route 213), Cecilton, Maryland
- Coordinates: 39°23′21″N 75°51′54″W
- Area: 16 acres (6.5 ha)
- Built: 1770
- Built by: Ward II, Peregrine
- Architectural style: Georgian
- NRHP reference No.: 72000574
- Added to NRHP: February 11, 1972

Greenfields is a historic home located at Cecilton, Cecil County, Maryland, United States. It is a 2 1/2-story, Georgian-style brick dwelling with a hip roof, built about 1770. The home features a central door with engaged Doric columns and a fanlight in a one-bay pedimented pavilion. It was home to Governor Thomas Ward Veazey (Governor from 1836 to 1839) and John Ward, Colonel of the Provincial Militia of Cecil County (1756).

This fine Georgian manor house was built earlier than 1770, around 1740 to 1760. It was built on land patented to John Ward in 1674. The Ward family occupied it for at least 100 years. It was one of the fox hunting centers of Cecil County Maryland, that sport being one of the early settlers' favorites. The mansion is noted for its architectural purity and for its paneling and fine woodwork. Especially noteworthy are the Wall of Troy and the Rose of Sharon molding. The original brick dependencies were still standing in 1967. Other noteworthy features are the large reception hall with its graceful, easy-tread stairway; the big fireplaces in both wings, as well as smaller ones in each of the rooms; the fanlights over the double door entrances to each of the wings; the family graveyard; the old boxwood and the large maple tree, one of the largest in the state of Maryland. Greenfields is privately owned.

It was listed on the National Register of Historic Places in 1972.
