= Great House (St. Augustine, Maryland) =

Historic house in Maryland, United States

- U.S. National Register of Historic Places
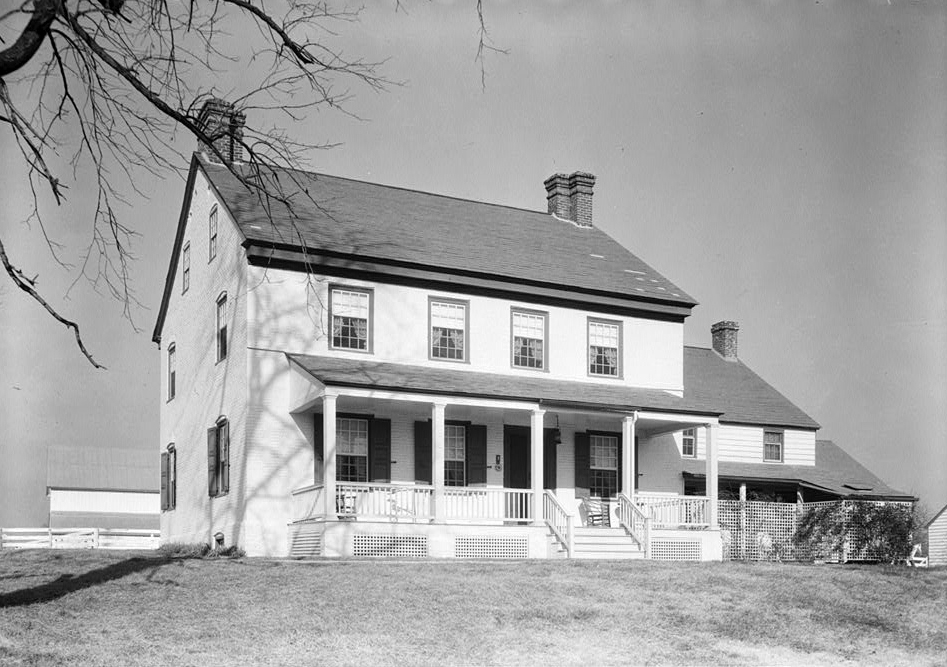
- Great House, HABS Photo, December 1936

- Location within Maryland Location within the United States
- Nearest city: St. Augustine, Maryland
- Coordinates: 39°27′56″N 75°49′37″W
- Area: 1.9 acres (0.77 ha)
- NRHP reference No.: 84001598
- Added to NRHP: June 7, 1984

Great House is a historic home located at St. Augustine, Cecil County, Maryland, United States. It is a large two-story brick dwelling constructed in the second quarter of the 18th century. The house retains virtually all its original interior detailing and hardware.

Great House was listed on the National Register of Historic Places in 1984.
