= List of highways numbered 283 =

The following highways are numbered 283:

== Canada ==
- Manitoba Provincial Road 283
- Quebec Route 283

== Japan ==
- Japan National Route 283

== United States ==
- Interstate 283
- U.S. Route 283
- Alabama State Route 283
- Arkansas Highway 283
- California State Route 283
- Georgia State Route 283
- Iowa Highway 283
- Kentucky Route 283
- Maryland Route 283 (former)
- Missouri Route 283
- Montana Secondary Highway 283
- New Mexico State Road 283
- New York State Route 283
- Ohio State Route 283
- Pennsylvania Route 283
- South Carolina Highway 283
- Tennessee State Route 283
- Texas State Highway 283
  - Farm to Market Road 283 (Texas)
- Utah State Route 283 (former)
- Virginia State Route 283
- Washington State Route 283

Preceded by 282	Lists of highways 283	Succeeded by 284
