= List of highways numbered 284 =

The following highways are numbered 284:

== Japan ==
- Japan National Route 284

== United States ==
- Interstate 284 (former)
- Arkansas Highway 284
- California State Route 284
- Florida State Road 284 (former)
- Georgia State Route 284
- K-284 (Kansas highway)
- Kentucky Route 284
- Maryland Route 284
- Minnesota State Highway 284
- Montana Secondary Highway 284
- New Jersey Route 284
- New York State Route 284
- Ohio State Route 284
- Pennsylvania Route 284
- South Carolina Route 284
- Tennessee State Route 284
- Texas State Highway 284 (former)
  - Texas State Highway Loop 284
  - Farm to Market Road 284 (Texas)
- Utah State Route 284

Preceded by 283	Lists of highways 284	Succeeded by 285
