= List of highways numbered 282 =

The following highways are numbered 282:

== Brazil ==
- BR-282

== Canada ==
- Manitoba Provincial Road 282

== Cuba ==
- Road to Paso Real (1–282)

== Japan ==
- Japan National Route 282

== United States ==
- Arkansas Highway 282
- California State Route 282
- Georgia State Route 282
- Iowa Highway 282 (former)
- Kentucky Route 282
- Maryland Route 282
- Minnesota State Highway 282
- Montana Secondary Highway 282
- New Mexico State Road 282
- New York State Route 282
- Ohio State Route 282
- Oregon Route 282
- Pennsylvania Route 282
- Tennessee State Route 282
- Texas State Highway 282 (former)
  - Texas State Highway Loop 282
  - Farm to Market Road 282 (Texas)
- Utah State Route 282
- Washington State Route 282

Preceded by 281	Lists of highways 282	Succeeded by 283
