= Maryland Route 286 =

State highway in Maryland, United States

Maryland Route 286
- Maryland Route 286 highlighted in red

Route information
- Maintained by MDSHA
- Length: 2.09 mi (3.36 km)
- Existed: 1930–present

Major junctions
- West end: MD 537 in Chesapeake City
- East end: DE 286 near Chesapeake City

Location
- Country: United States
- State: Maryland
- Counties: Cecil

Highway system
- Maryland highway system; Interstate; US; State; Scenic Byways
← MD 285	→ MD 287

Maryland Route 286 (MD 286) is a state highway in the U.S. state of Maryland. Known for most of its length as Bethel Road, the highway runs 2.09 miles (3.36 km) from George Street, which is one of the segments of unsigned MD 537, east through Chesapeake City to the Delaware state line, where the highway continues east as Delaware Route 286 (DE 286). MD 286 roughly parallels the south side of the Chesapeake & Delaware Canal in southern Cecil County. The highway was constructed around 1930 and originally served the former community of Bethel instead of crossing the state line. A connection to Delaware was added in the late 1940s, and the segment to Bethel was removed in the late 1950s. MD 286's course within Chesapeake City was changed to its present routing in the mid-1960s.

== Route description ==
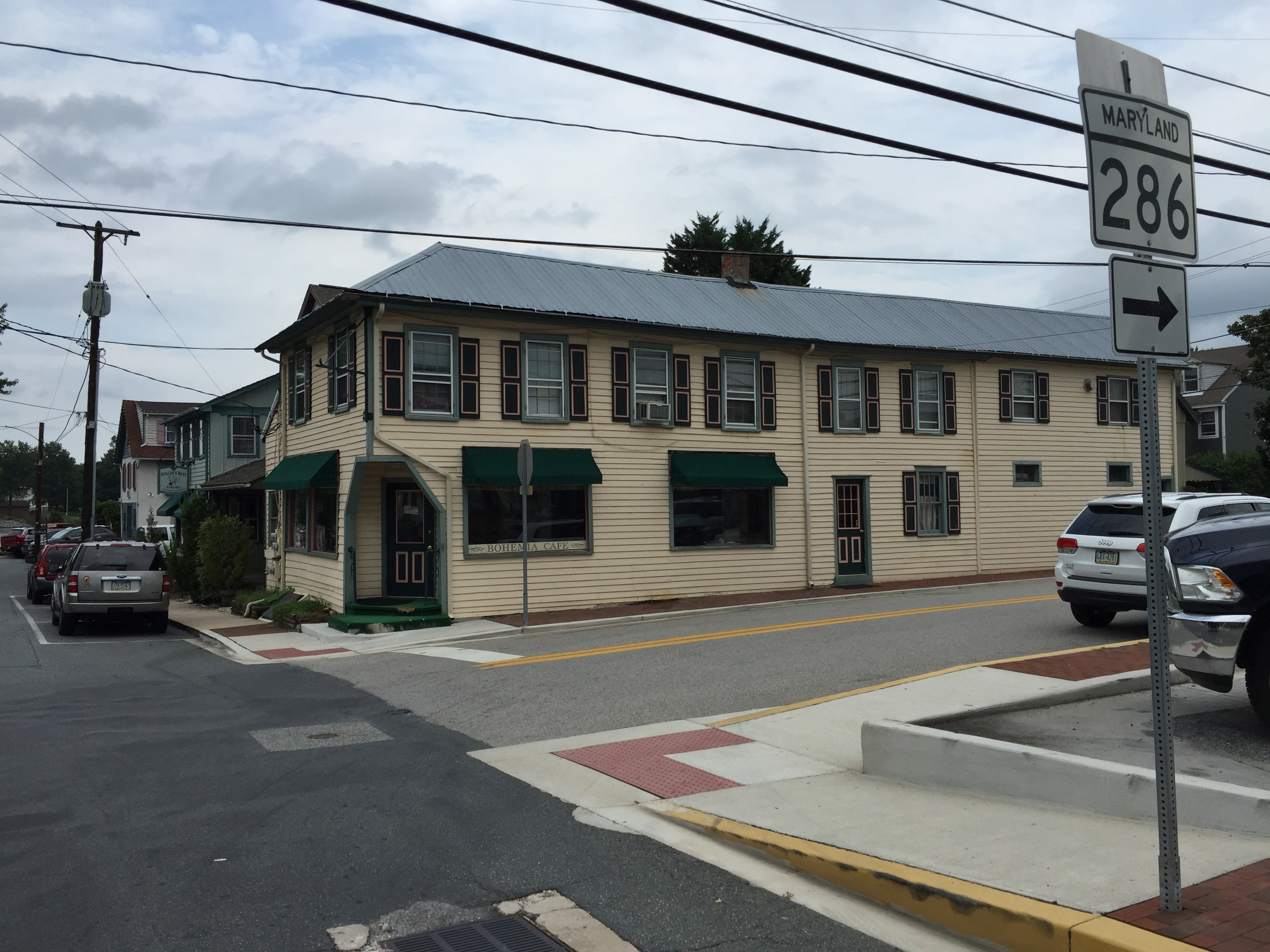
View east at the west end of MD 286 at MD 537 in Chesapeake City

MD 286 begins at an intersection with George Street (unsigned MD 537C) on the south side of the town of Chesapeake City. The highway heads east as two-lane undivided 2nd Street through the South Chesapeake City Historic District. At Bohemia Avenue, MD 286 becomes Bethel Road and curves around the Back Creek Mooring Basin. After crossing Back Creek, the highway makes a right-angle turn at the entrance to the Chesapeake & Delaware Canal Museum, which includes the Old Lock Pump House. MD 286 leaves the town limits of Chesapeake City and passes along the southern boundary of the Bethel Managed Hunting Area. Shortly after the intersection with Bethel Cemetery Road, which leads to the eponymous burial ground, the highway reaches its eastern terminus at the Delaware state line. The road continues east as DE 286 (Bethel Church Road), which terminates at DE 15.

== History ==
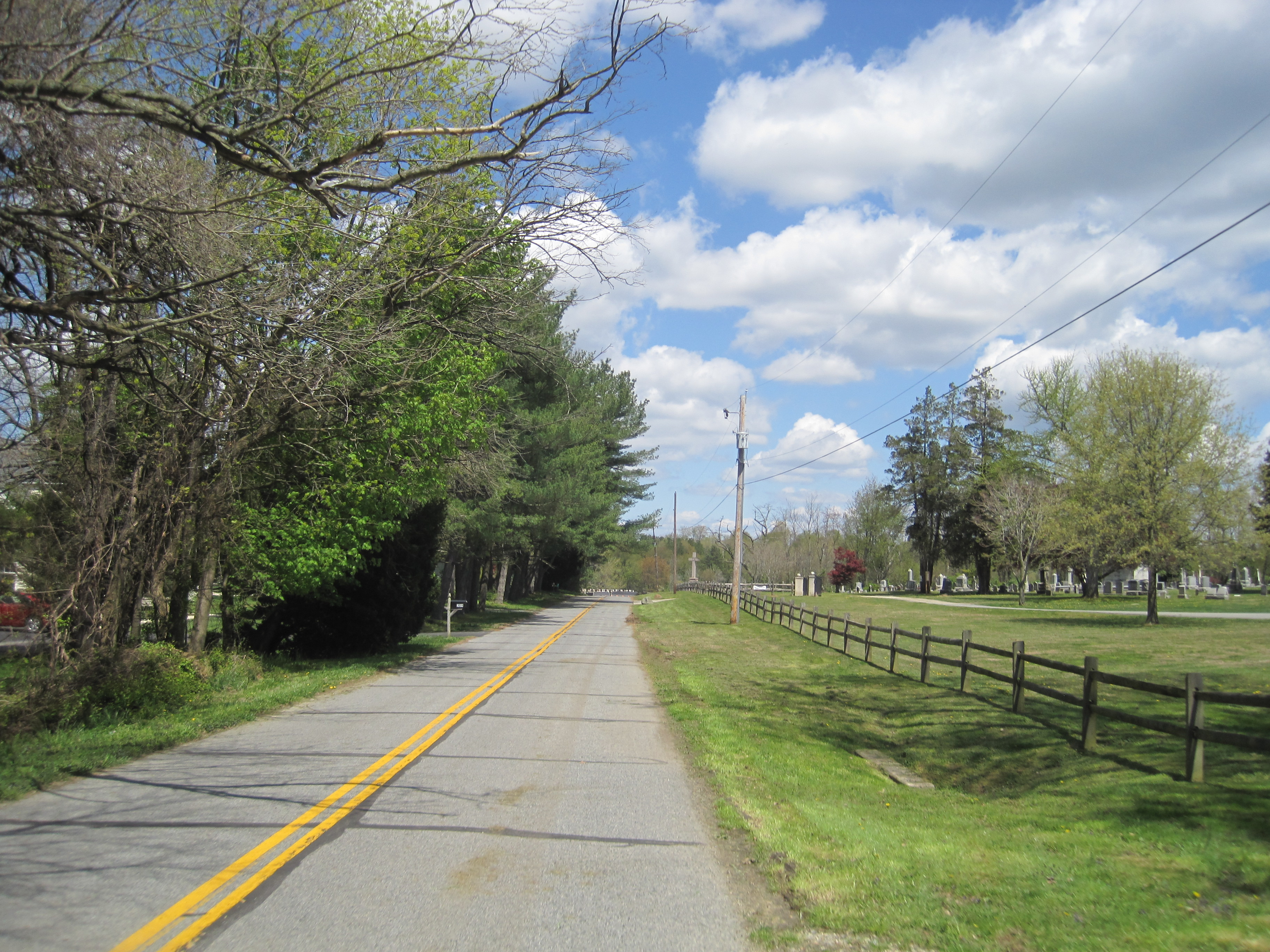
Site of Bethel and the original ending of MD 286

All of MD 286 except for the eastern and western ends was constructed as a 18-foot-wide (5.5 m) concrete road between 1928 and 1930. The original route was L-shaped; instead of the highway continuing into Delaware, the highway turned north onto Bethel Cemetery Road to the old village of Bethel, which was alternately known as Pivot Bridge. The western end of MD 286 included two blocks of the original state road between Cecilton and Elkton, which was paved as a 14-foot-wide (4.3 m) concrete road within Chesapeake City in 1915. The state road entered Chesapeake City from the north along Hemphill Street, crossed the Chesapeake & Delaware Canal on a one-lane bridge, turned west and crossed Back Creek on a wooden bridge, turned south onto Bohemia Street in South Chesapeake City, turned west onto Third Street, and turned south onto George Street to the south end of town.

In the 1920s, the U.S. Army Corps of Engineers widened, straightened, and deepened the canal. As part of their work, the agency constructed a vertical lift bridge across the canal. Between 1924 and 1926, the Maryland State Roads Commission constructed approaches to the new bridge on both sides of the expanded canal, eliminating two narrow and dangerous bridges and four right-angle turns in Chesapeake City. The new route along George Street became part of U.S. Route 213 (US 213) in 1927. The two blocks along 3rd Street and Bohemia Street became the western end of MD 286. After the tanker Franz Klasen destroyed the vertical lift bridge on July 28, 1942, the U.S. Army Corps of Engineers constructed the present tied arch Chesapeake City Bridge and new approach roads to the bridge between 1946 and 1949. US 213 was moved to the new Chesapeake City Bridge, leaving behind MD 537C on George Street.

In their post–World War II planning request, Cecil County's top priority was rectifying the lack of connection of MD 286 to Delaware. Their wish was fulfilled when the state received the 0.25-mile-long (0.40 km) link of Bethel Road between Bethel Cemetery Road and the state line in a July 1, 1947, road transfer agreement and promptly paved it. The 0.93-mile-long (1.50 km) Bethel Cemetery Road portion of MD 286 was transferred to county control in a May 8, 1958, road transfer agreement. The western end of MD 286 achieved its present form through a December 22, 1965, road transfer agreement between the state and the town of Chesapeake City. The state transferred the 0.11 miles (0.18 km) of highway on 3rd Street and Bohemia Street to the town, and the state took control of 0.05 miles (0.080 km) on the block of 2nd Street between George Street and Bohemia Street. MD 286 was resurfaced with bituminous concrete along its entire length in 1976, and the highway's bridge across Back Creek was replaced in 2002 and 2003.

== Junction list ==
The entire route is in Cecil County.

Location	mi	km	Destinations	Notes
Chesapeake City	0.00	0.00	MD 537 (George Street) to MD 213 / 2nd Street west – Elkton, Cecilton	Western terminus; officially unsigned MD 537C
	2.09	3.36	DE 286 east (Bethel Church Road) – Summit Bridge	Delaware state line; eastern terminus
1.000 mi = 1.609 km; 1.000 km = 0.621 mi

== Auxiliary route ==
MD 286A was the designation for the 0.07-mile-long (0.11 km) block of Bohemia Street between 2nd Street and 1st Street. This block of Bohemia Street was part of the original route of the Cecilton–Elkton state road through Chesapeake City, with its northern end curving east and feeding into the bridge across Back Creek. This piece of state highway was bypassed with the construction of the new route along George Street. MD 286A was transferred from state to town maintenance in a November 30, 1994, road transfer agreement.
