= List of highways numbered 281 =

The following highways are numbered 281:

== Canada ==
- Quebec Route 281

== Japan ==
- Japan National Route 281

== United States ==
- U.S. Route 281
- Alabama State Route 281
- Arkansas Highway 281
- California State Route 281
- Florida State Road 281
- Georgia State Route 281
- Iowa Highway 281
- Kentucky Route 281
- Maryland Route 281
- Minnesota State Highway 281 (former)
- Montana Secondary Highway 281 (former)
- New Mexico State Route 281
- New York State Route 281
- North Carolina Highway 281
- North Dakota Highway 281
- Ohio State Route 281
- Oklahoma State Highway 281A
- Oregon Route 281
- Pennsylvania Route 281
- South Carolina Highway 281
- Tennessee State Route 281
- Texas State Highway 281 (former proposed)
  - Texas State Highway Loop 281
  - Farm to Market Road 281 (Texas)
- Utah State Route 281 (former)
- Washington State Route 281

Preceded by 280	Lists of highways 281	Succeeded by 282
