= St. Augustine, Maryland =

Unincorporated community in Maryland, United States

- Unincorporated community
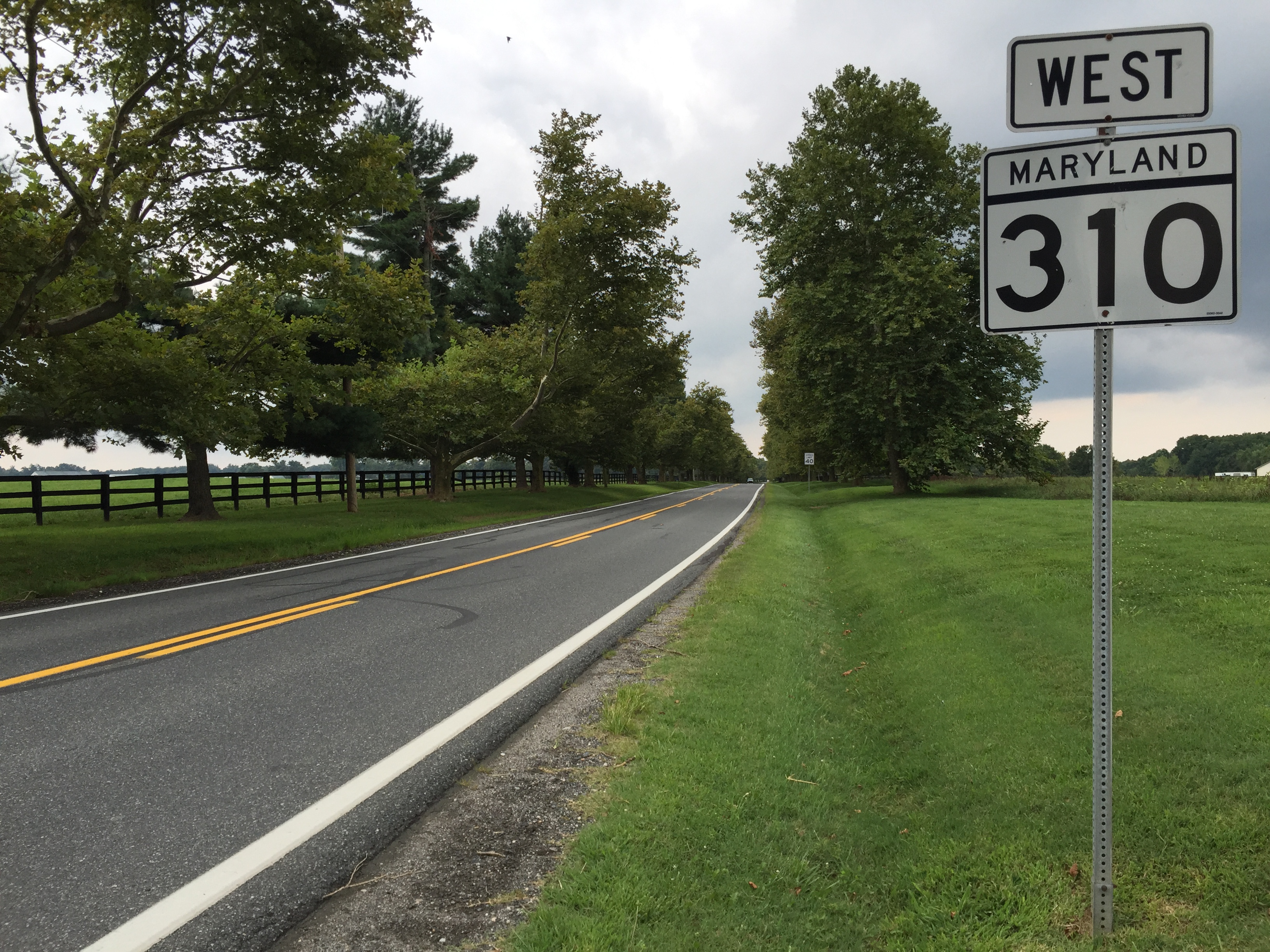
- Looking west along Maryland Route 310 at Maryland Route 342 in St. Augustine

- Location within the State of Maryland St. Augustine (the United States)
- Coordinates: 39°29′39″N 75°48′32″W
- Country: United States
- State: Maryland
- County: Cecil
- Time zone: UTC-5 (Eastern (EST))
  - Summer (DST): UTC-4 (EDT)

St. Augustine is an unincorporated community in Cecil County, Maryland, United States.

Land rights to the area were granted to merchant Augustine Herman by Lord Baltimore prior to 1686 but the Herman family was never able to lay proper claim to the title.

Great House was listed on the National Register of Historic Places in 1984.
