= Maryland Route 213 =

State highway in Maryland, US

Maryland Route 213
- MD 213 highlighted in red

Route information
- Maintained by MDSHA and USACE
- Length: 68.25 mi (109.84 km)
- Existed: 1971–present
- Tourist routes: Chesapeake Country Scenic Byway

Major junctions
- South end: MD 662 in Wye Mills
- US 50 near Wye Mills; US 301 near Centreville; MD 18 in Centreville; MD 300 in Church Hill; MD 291 in Chestertown; MD 290 / MD 313 in Galena; MD 282 in Cecilton; US 40 in Elkton; MD 279 in Elkton; MD 273 in Fair Hill
- North end: PA 841 at Pennsylvania border near Fair Hill

Location
- Country: United States
- State: Maryland
- Counties: Queen Anne's, Kent, Cecil

Highway system
- Maryland highway system; Interstate; US; State; Scenic Byways
← MD 212	→ MD 214

Maryland Route 213 (MD 213) is a 68.25-mile (109.84 km) state highway located on the Eastern Shore of Maryland in the United States. The route runs from MD 662 in Wye Mills, Queen Anne's County, north to the Pennsylvania border near Fair Hill in Cecil County, where the road continues into that state as Pennsylvania Route 841 (PA 841). The route, which is a two-lane undivided highway most of its length, passes through mainly rural areas as well as the towns of Centreville, Chestertown, Galena, Cecilton, Chesapeake City, and Elkton. MD 213 intersects many routes including U.S. Route 50 (US 50) near Wye Mills, US 301 near Centreville, and US 40 in Elkton. It crosses over the Chesapeake & Delaware Canal in Chesapeake City on the Chesapeake City Bridge. MD 213 is designated by the state as the Chesapeake Country Scenic Byway between the southern terminus and Chesapeake City with the portion north of MD 18 in Centreville a National Scenic Byway. In addition, the route is also considered part of the Atlantic to Appalachians Scenic Byway between Chesapeake City and MD 273 in Fair Hill.

The route was initially designated as U.S. Route 213 (US 213) in 1926 when the U.S. Highway System was established, running from Ocean City west and north to US 40 in Elkton. The highway was rerouted to cross the Nanticoke River in Vienna by 1933, with the former route between Mardela Springs and Eldorado becoming a part of MD 313 and the alignment between Eldorado and Rhodesdale becoming part of MD 14. US 213 was rerouted to use the Emerson C. Harrington Bridge over the Choptank River in Cambridge in 1939; the former alignment between Vienna and Easton became MD 331. Meanwhile, the road between Elkton and the Pennsylvania border became Maryland Route 280 (MD 280). US 213 was moved to a bypass of Easton and straight alignment between Easton and Wye Mills in 1948. A year later, the southern terminus was cut back to US 50 in Wye Mills, with an extended US 50 replacing US 213 between Wye Mills and Ocean City. In 1971, US 213 and MD 280 were decommissioned and replaced with MD 213.

== Route description ==
MD 213 is a part of the National Highway System as a principal arterial between US 40 and MD 279 within the town of Elkton.

=== Queen Anne's County ===
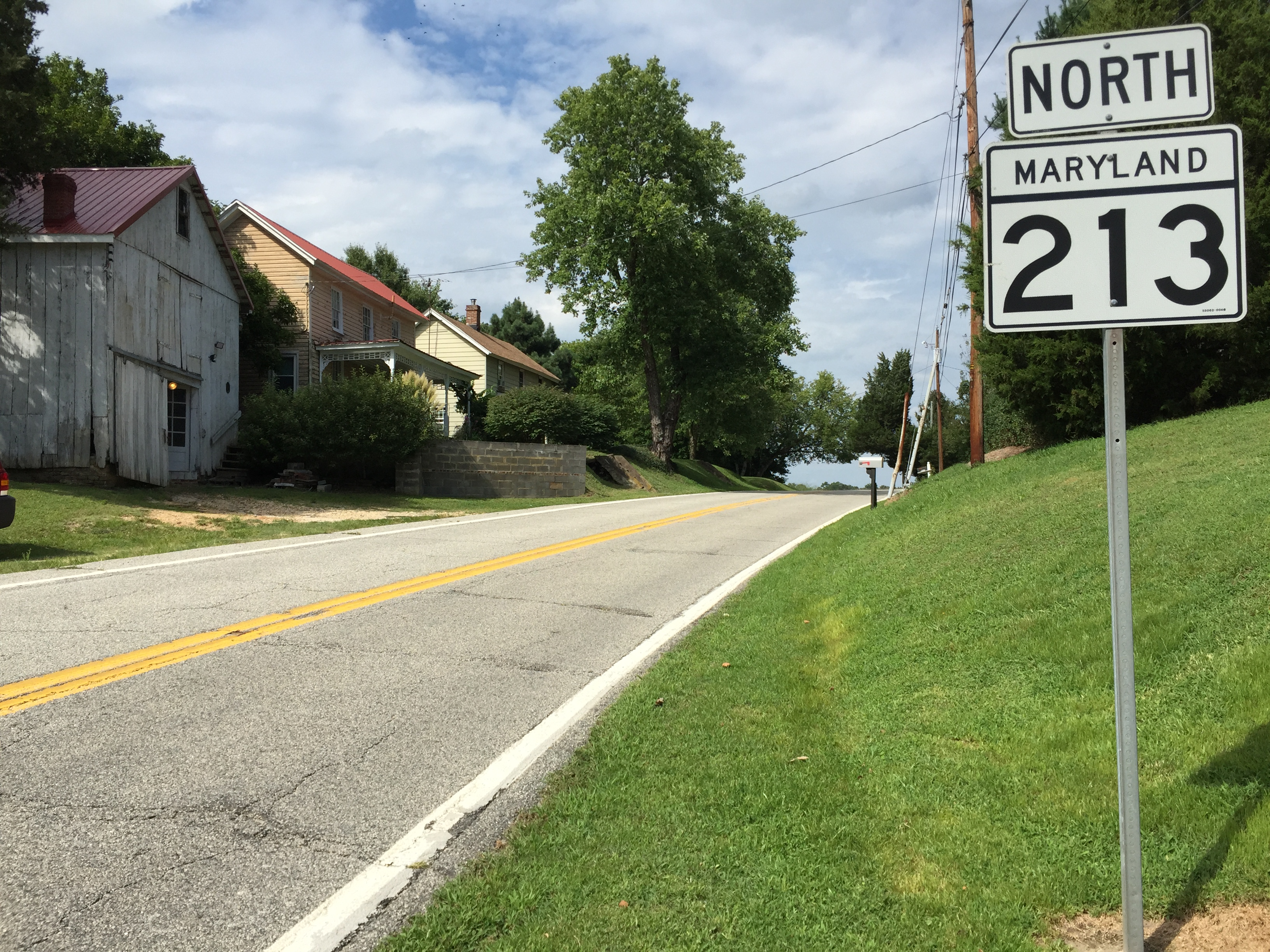
View north at the south end of MD 213 at MD 662 in Wye Mills

MD 213 begins at an intersection with MD 662 (Wye Mills Road) in Wye Mills, Queen Anne's County, heading to the north on College Drive, a two-lane undivided road. From the southern terminus, MD 213 is designated by the state as the Chesapeake Country Scenic Byway. The road heads into farmland, passing Chesapeake College on the west side of the road before intersecting US 50 (Ocean Gateway). Past this intersection, MD 213 continues north on Centreville Road, passing more farms as well as some residences. The route continues into a mix of woods and farmland before intersecting the northern terminus of MD 309 (Starr Road). A short distance later, the route reaches a partial cloverleaf interchange with US 301 (Blue Star Memorial Highway).

Past the US 301 interchange, MD 213 continues through more rural areas before entering the town of Centreville, where it passes some residential and commercial areas. It intersects the eastern terminus of MD 18 (4H Park Road). At this intersection, MD 213 becomes a part of the National Scenic Byway portion of the Chesapeake Country Scenic Byway. Past MD 18, the route continues into residential areas, eventually splitting into a one-way pair carrying one lane in each direction with northbound MD 213 following Commerce Street and southbound MD 213 following Liberty Street. This pairing continues past residences before heading into the downtown area, where the road intersects MD 304 (Water Street). Westbound MD 304 joins northbound MD 213 for a concurrency that lasts until the Broadway intersection north of the Queen Anne's County Courthouse, where MD 304 continues to the west; MD 304 is unsigned along the concurrency with MD 213.

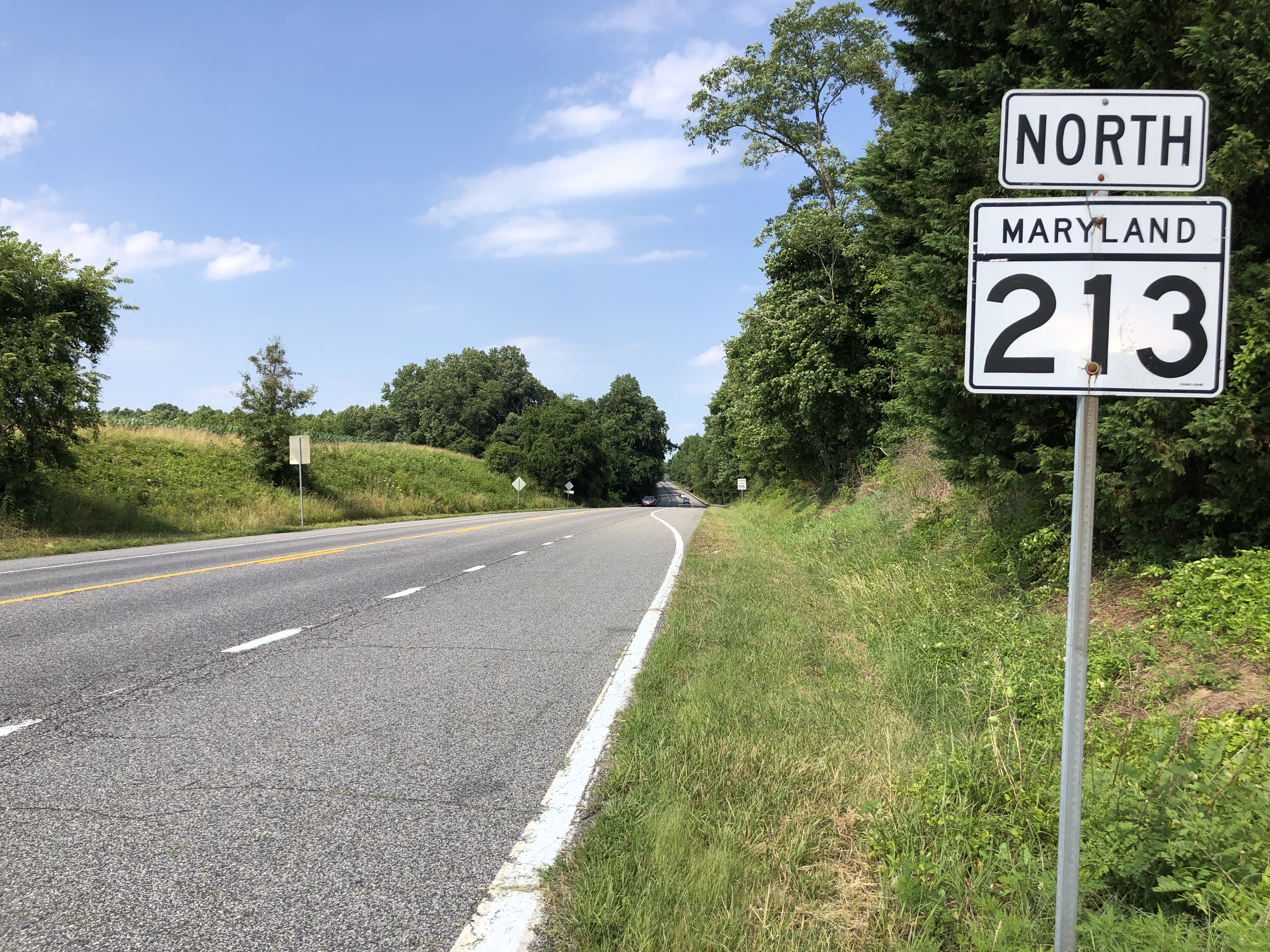
MD 213 northbound past MD 19A in Church Hill

MD 213 leaves downtown Centreville past MD 304. The one-way pair ends and the route continues north on two-lane undivided Liberty Street, passing by residences and some businesses. At the end of the one-way pair, the route sees an average of 12,912 vehicles daily. It intersects the western terminus of MD 305 (Hope Road), and passes by more residences before becoming Church Hill Road, which heads north into a mix of woods and farms with some housing developments. It angles to the northeast and then north through more rural areas, consisting mostly of farm fields with some wooded areas and occasional residences. MD 213 continues in a northeast direction before reaching the town of Church Hill.

Upon reaching Church Hill, the route intersects unsigned MD 19A (South Main Street), which loops to the east of MD 213 to head into the town. Meanwhile, MD 213 bypasses Church Hill to the west, running through woodland, and intersects the western terminus of MD 300 (Sudlersville Road). The route heads back into farmland and has a junction with the western terminus of MD 19 (North Main Street), leaving the Church Hill area. MD 213 continues north through a mix of woods and farms. From here, the route turns northwest through more farmland before it passes some residences and businesses near the intersection with the western terminus of MD 544 (McGinnes Road). Past the MD 544 intersection, the road continues through rural areas, but residences and businesses start to increase. MD 213 passes through Kingstown before crossing the Chester River on a drawbridge.

=== Kent County ===
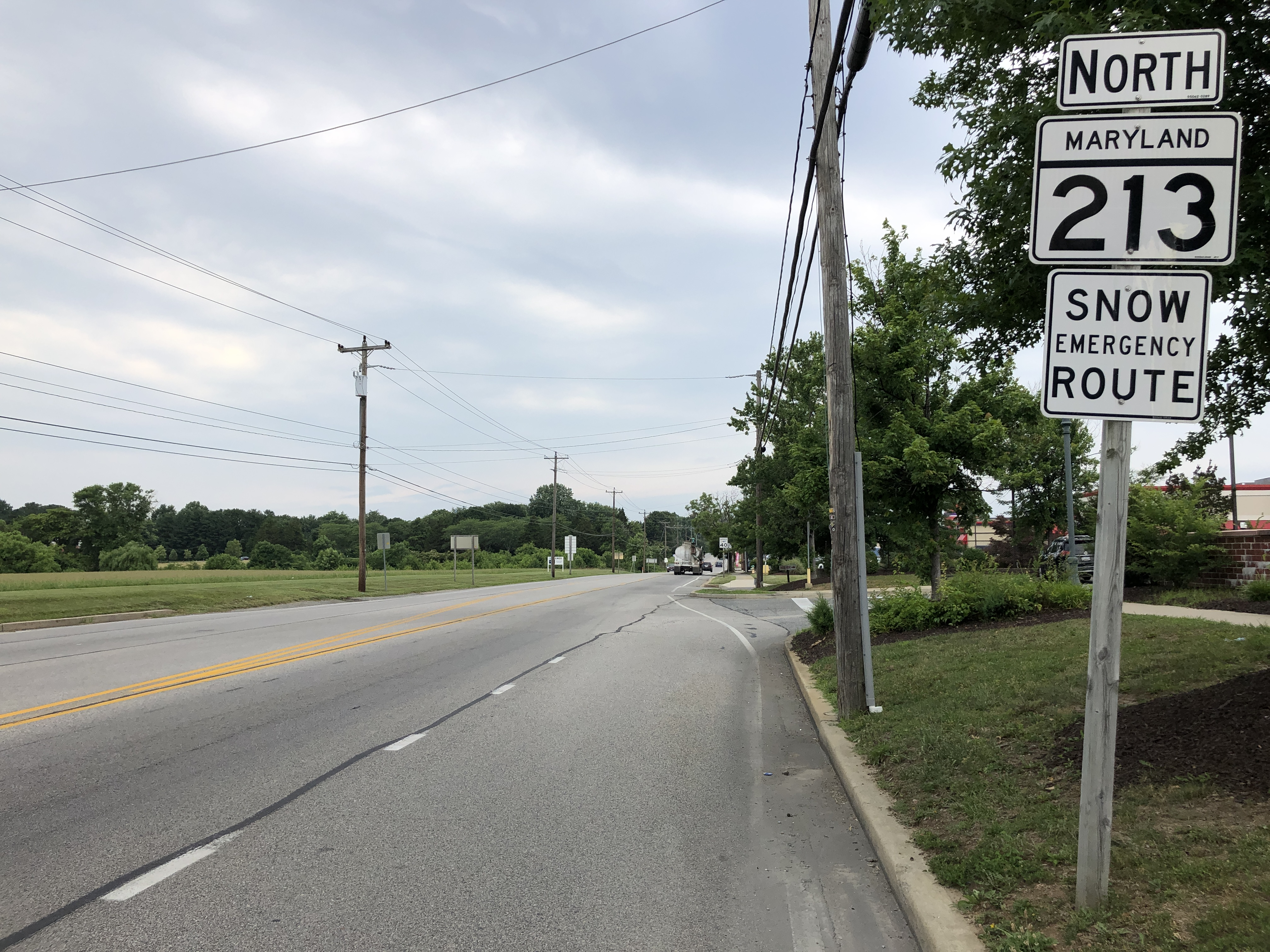
MD 213 northbound past MD 291 in Chestertown

Upon crossing the Chester River, MD 213 enters the town of Chestertown in Kent County, where the route heads northwest on Maple Avenue through residential areas. It intersects the northern terminus of MD 289 (Cross Street) in the downtown area and turns north onto Washington Avenue at the junction with Spring Avenue. Washington Avenue carries MD 213 north through residential neighborhoods and passes to the west of the University of Maryland Shore Medical Center at Chestertown and by Washington College. Past the college, the route gains a center left-turn lane and continues past business, intersecting MD 291 (Morgnec Road). Past this intersection, MD 213 continues through residential and commercial areas before it narrows back to a two-lane road.

The road leaves Chestertown and becomes Augustine Herman Highway, which is named for Bohemian surveyor Augustine Herman. The road heads into farmland with residences along the west side of the road. MD 213 intersects the southern terminus of MD 297 (Worton Road) and heads past more farm fields. The road turns northeast and has a junction with the southern terminus of MD 561 (Hassengers Corner Road). It continues through more rural areas, consisting mostly of farms with some wooded areas before reaching Kennedyville, where MD 213 passes residences. In Kennedyville, the road crosses the Chestertown Branch of the Northern Line of the Maryland and Delaware Railroad at-grade.

Upon leaving Kennedyville, MD 213 continues back into agricultural areas. The route makes a turn to the east, with an old bypassed segment remaining as unsigned MD 855. MD 213 intersects MD 298 (Browntown Road) and resumes northeast and east again. It intersects unsigned MD 449 (Shallcross Wharf Road), a road that connects to MD 444 (Kentmore Park Road), which MD 213 intersects a short distance later. From here, the route continues east and northeast through more farmland before heading into a mix of farms and woods. The route enters the town of Galena, where it becomes Cross Street. In the center of town, MD 213 meets MD 290 and MD 313 at the intersection with Main Street. Here, MD 290 and MD 313 continue south on Main Street, MD 290 continues east on Cross Street, and MD 213 makes a left turn to head north on Main Street. Main Street passes residences before leaving Galena, where the road becomes Augustine Herman Highway again. The road continues through a mix of farms and woods before reaching the community of Georgetown, where the route passes some homes before crossing the Sassafras River on a drawbridge near a marina.

=== Cecil County ===
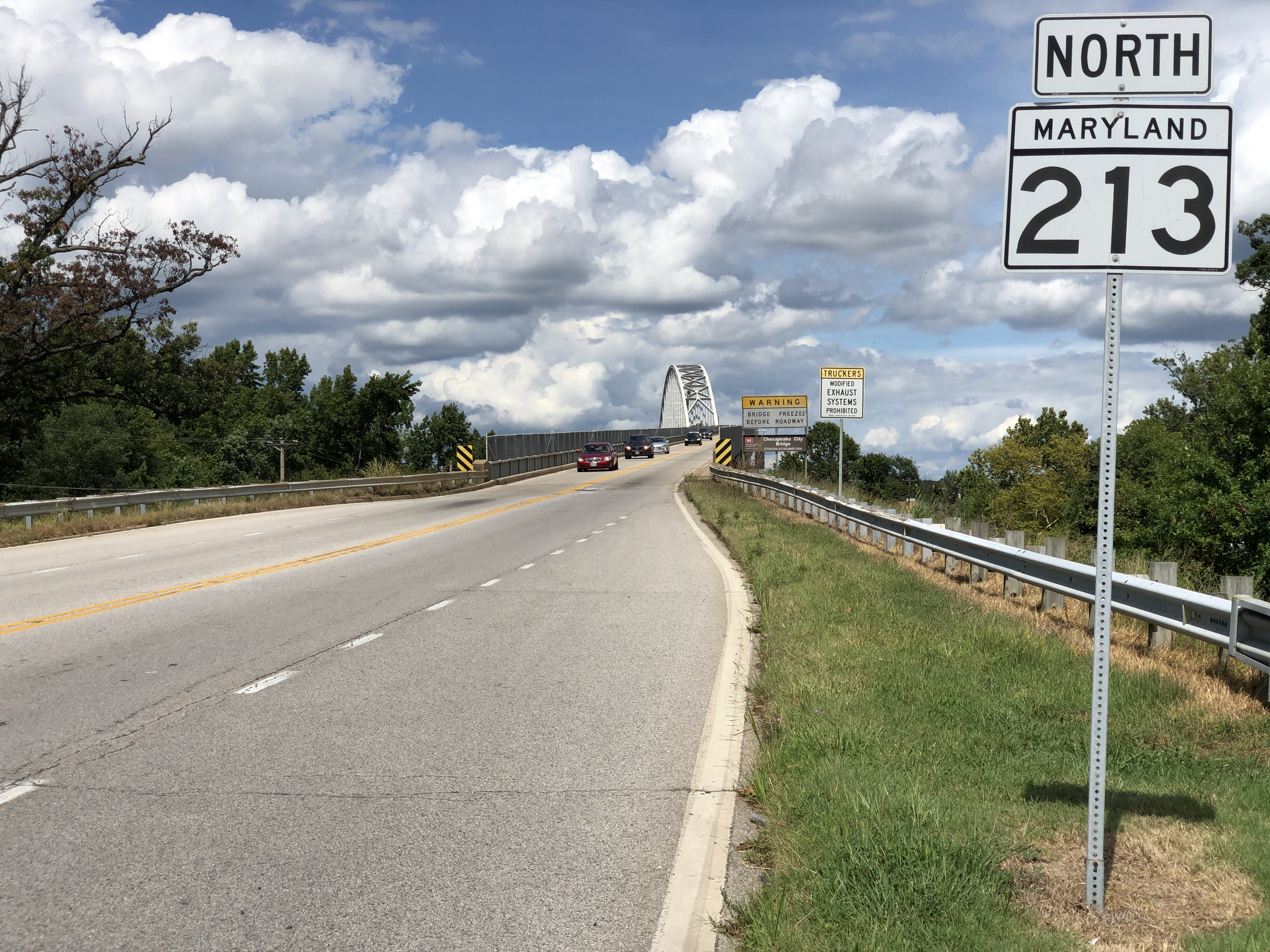
MD 213 northbound approaching the Chesapeake City Bridge over the Chesapeake & Delaware Canal

MD 213 enters Cecil County upon crossing the Sassafras River, where it continues north through wooded and agricultural areas with some residences. The route enters the town of Cecilton, where it becomes Bohemia Avenue. In Cecilton, MD 213 passes residences along with a few businesses and intersects MD 282 (Main Street) in the center of town. Upon leaving Cecilton, the name of the road becomes Augustine Herman Highway again. The Cecilton area is home to a small Amish settlement. MD 213 passes through farmland, with intermittent woods and rural residences, before crossing over the Bohemia River. Past the Bohemia River, the road turns northeast through more rural areas before intersecting the western terminus of MD 310 (Cayots Corner Road) in Cayots. Past MD 310, the route continues through farms and woods with some residences and businesses before heading into the Chesapeake City area, where residences increase along the road and it passes to the east of Bohemia Manor High School. Upon reaching the town of Chesapeake City, MD 213 features an interchange with MD 537, which provides access to the southern portion of Chesapeake City as well as to MD 286 and MD 342.

In Chesapeake City, the Chesapeake Country Scenic Byway ends and MD 213 continues north as a part of the Atlantic to Appalachians Scenic Byway which crosses the state of Maryland. Past this interchange, MD 213 passes over the Chesapeake & Delaware Canal on the Chesapeake City Bridge, a tied-arch bridge. After crossing the canal, the road intersects the western terminus of MD 285 (Lock Street), which provides access to the northern portion of Chesapeake City. Past MD 285, the route resumes through a mix of woodland and farmland, crossing Long Creek and Perch Creek, with residential areas increasing along the road. It approaches the Elkton area and heads through residential areas.

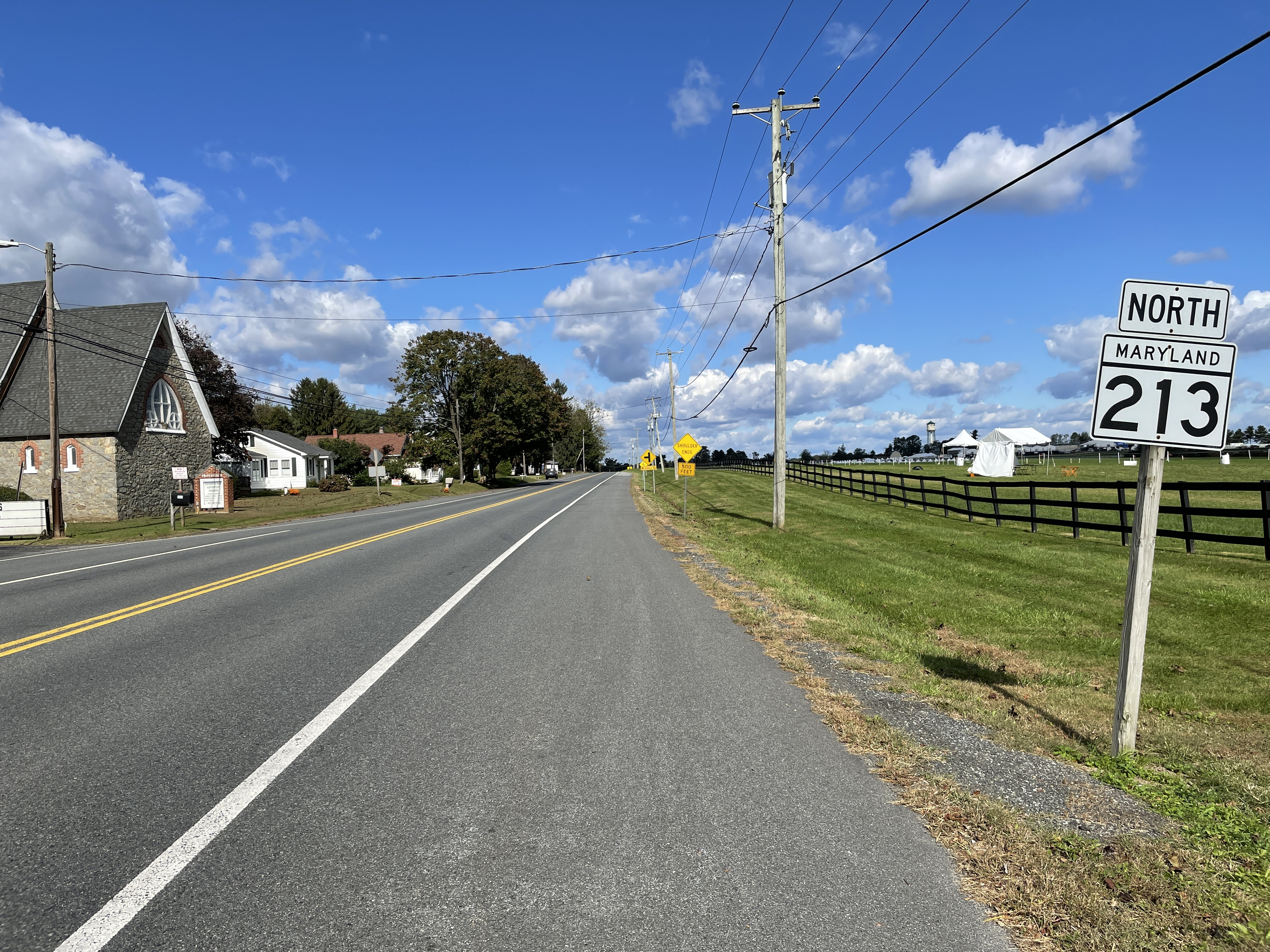
MD 213 northbound south of Fair Hill

MD 213 enters the town of Elkton at the intersection with US 40 (Pulaski Highway). Past this intersection, the route heads northwest on Bridge Street, passing through commercial areas as a three-lane road with a center left-turn lane. The route narrows to two lanes before it crosses Big Elk Creek and intersects Main Street, which continues east of MD 213 as a one-way street eastbound. Past Main Street, the road heads north and passes over Amtrak's Northeast Corridor railroad line before intersecting the southern terminus of MD 545 (Elkton Boulevard). MD 213 continues past commercial areas to the west and residential areas to the east as a three-lane road with a center left-turn lane before its junction with MD 279 (Newark Avenue). Past the MD 279 junction, the route narrows back to two lanes before it leaves Elkton and becomes Singerly Road, which continues past residences. MD 213 enters a mix of woods and farms and passes over Interstate 95 (John F. Kennedy Memorial Highway) without an interchange and CSX's Philadelphia Subdivision railroad line within a short distance of each other. It continues through a mix of farms and residences before the road reaches the Leeds roundabout with Leeds Road/Elk Mills Road west of the community of Cherry Hill. Past the roundabout, the route resumes north, intersecting MD 273 (Telegraph Road) in the community of Fair Hill west of the Fair Hill Training Center and the Fair Hill Natural Resources Management Area, where the Atlantic to Appalachians Scenic Byway leaves MD 213 and heads west along MD 273. From here, the name of MD 213 changes to Lewisville Road and it curves northwest and north through a mix of rural areas and residences before ending at the Pennsylvania border. Here, the road continues north into that state as PA 841 (Chesterville Road) and reaches the community of Lewisville, intersecting the southern terminus of PA 472 (Lewisville Road) just north of the state line.

== History ==
U.S. Route 213
- Location: Wye Mills–Elkton
- Length: 58.27 mi (93.78 km)
- Existed: 1926–1971

In 1911, what would become US 213 was completed as a state highway between Hebron and Riverton via Mardela Springs, Easton and Longwoods, Centerville and Church Hill, and in the Chestertown area, while the present road between Elkton and Singerly was also built as a state highway. The portion of roads between Riverton and Sharptown, Brookview and Hurlock, Church Hill and southeast of Chestertown, northeast of Chestertown and northeast of Kennedyville, and Chesapeake City and Elkton were under contract to be built as state roads. At this time, a state highway was proposed along the segments between Ocean City and Berlin, Salisbury and Hebron, Sharptown and Brookview, Hurlock and Easton, Longwoods and Centreville, northeast of Kennedyville and Chesapeake City, and Elkton and Fair Hill. By 1915, the entire length of road between Ocean City and Elkton was completed as a state highway. The state highway between Singerly and south of Fair Hill was finished by 1923. The state highway was finished to Fair Hill by 1927.

With the creation of the U.S. Highway System on November 11, 1926, US 213 was designated to run from the Atlantic Ocean in Ocean City west and north to US 40 in Elkton. The route headed west from Ocean City through Berlin and Salisbury (where it intersected its parent route US 13), before it ran northwest to Mardela Springs. Here, US 213 turned to the north and ran to Eldorado, where it continued northwest through Hurlock and Preston to Easton. From Easton, the route continued north to Wye Mills and followed the present alignment of MD 213 to Elkton. A new Dover Bridge over the Choptank River east of Easton, replacing a bridge built in the 19th century, was completed in 1932. By 1933, US 213 was rerouted to cross the Nanticoke River at Vienna instead of at Sharptown. The route headed west from Mardela Springs to Vienna, where it turned north to Rhodesdale. The former alignment of US 213 became a southern extension of MD 313 between Mardela Springs and Eldorado and an eastern extension of MD 14 between Rhodesdale and Eldorado.

Maryland Route 280
- Location: Elkton–Fair Hill
- Length: 9.40 mi (15.13 km)
- Existed: 1939–1971

In 1939, US 213 was realigned to cross the Choptank River at Cambridge on the Emerson C. Harrington Bridge that opened in 1935. The route replaced MD 344 between Vienna and Mount Holly, ran concurrent with MD 16 between Mount Holly and Cambridge, and turned north across the river to continue to Easton. The former routing of US 213 between Vienna and Easton became MD 331. In 1939, the road between US 40 and the northern terminus of US 213 in Elkton and the Pennsylvania border north of Fair Hill was designated MD 280. The portion of MD 280 between Fair Hill and the Pennsylvania border was built as a state highway by 1933. On July 28, 1942, the vertical lift bridge carrying US 213 over the Chesapeake & Delaware Canal, built in 1927, was destroyed when the tanker Franz Klasen struck it. The destroyed bridge was replaced by the current Chesapeake City Bridge, which opened in 1949. The approaches to the original bridge are now designated as MD 537 and a western extension of MD 285.

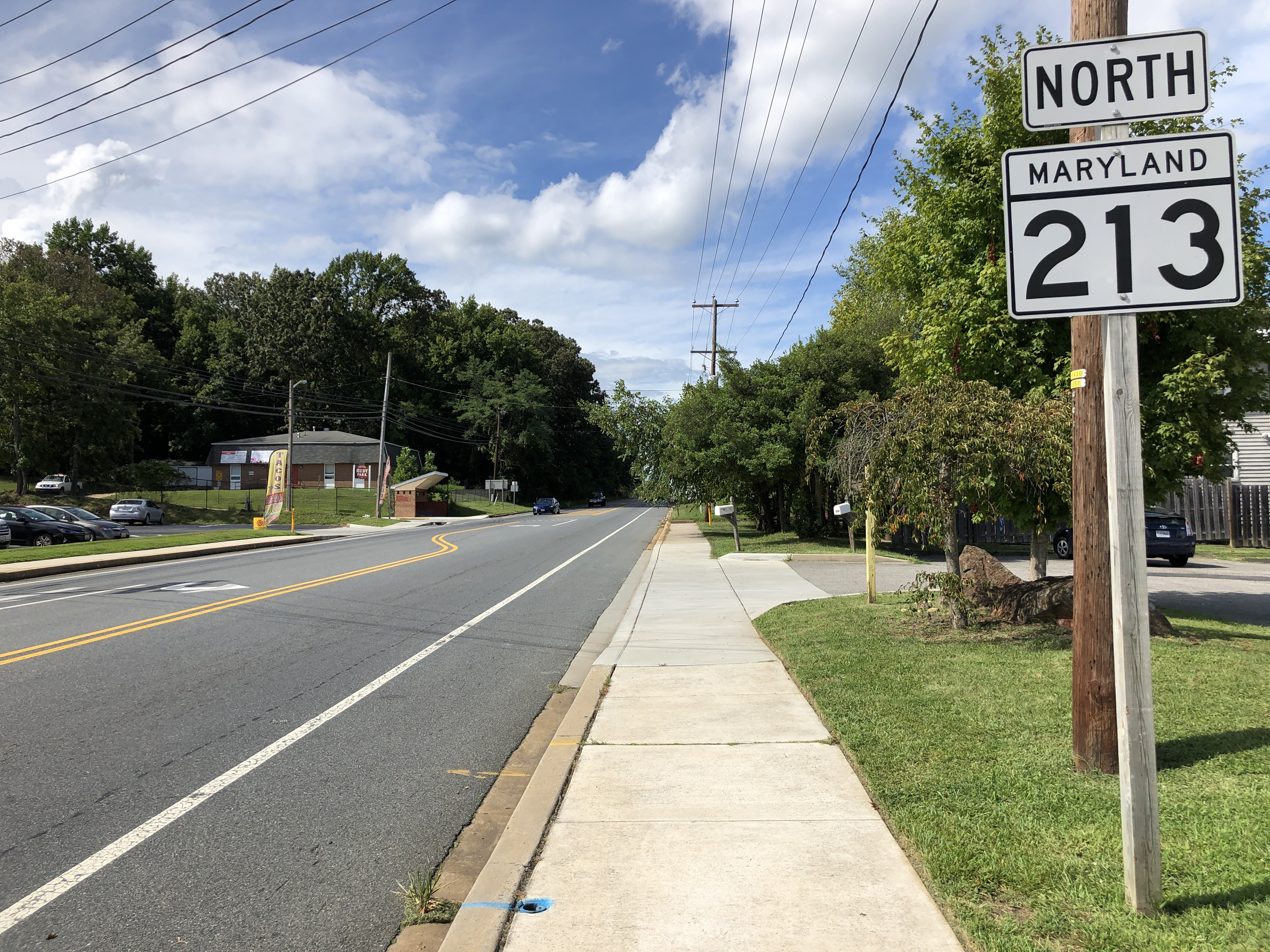
MD 213 northbound past MD 279 in Elkton

US 213 was relocated to a new divided highway alignment to the north between Herring Creek in West Ocean City and Ocean City in 1942, including a new bridge across Sinepuxent Bay into Ocean City (the current Harry W. Kelley Memorial Bridge). The bypassed portion of US 213 remained a state highway and was designated MD 707 by 1948. A portion of US 213 south of Easton was moved to a straight alignment by 1946; the former routing became MD 565. By 1946, work was underway for a bypass to the east of Easton along with a straight alignment between Easton and Wye Mills. US 213 was moved to this new alignment in 1948, with the former alignment on Washington Street in Easton becoming an extended MD 333 in the southern part of the city and an extended MD 33 in the northern part the city, while MD 662 was designated on the original alignment between Easton and Wye Mills.

In 1949, US 50 was extended from Annapolis across the Chesapeake Bay, first via a ferry run by the Maryland State Roads Commission, then over the original span of the Chesapeake Bay Bridge when it was completed in the middle of 1952, all the way to Ocean City. The southern terminus of US 213 was cut back to US 50 in Wye Mills, with the former route of US 213 between Wye Mills and Ocean City becoming part of the newly extended US 50. The former routing of US 213 between Wye Mills and Ocean City is now US 50 between Wye Mills and Vienna, Old Route 50 through Vienna, US 50 between Vienna and Salisbury, US 50 Bus. through Salisbury, MD 346 between Salisbury and east of Berlin, and US 50 between east of Berlin and Ocean City. In 1951, US 213 was realigned at Cayots to eliminate a sharp turn at the MD 310 intersection. The bypassed alignment became a western extension of MD 310 and MD 310A (now a county road named Cayots Corner Road Spur). On December 3, 1971, the American Association of State Highway Officials approved the elimination of the US 213 designation. US 213 along with MD 280 were replaced by MD 213, which ran from MD 662 in Wye Mills north to PA 841 at the Pennsylvania border north of Fair Hill. In 1994, the at-grade intersection with US 301 was replaced with an interchange.

== Junction list ==
County	Location	mi	km	Destinations	Notes
Queen Anne's	Wye Mills	0.00	0.00	MD 662 (Wye Mills Road)	Southern terminus of MD 213
Queen Anne's	Wye Mills	0.82	1.32	US 50 (Ocean Gateway) – Bay Bridge, Easton	
Queen Anne's		4.19	6.74	MD 309 south (Starr Road) – Starr, Queen Anne	Northern terminus of MD 309
Queen Anne's		5.21	8.38	US 301 (Blue Star Memorial Highway) – Bay Bridge, Wilmington	Interchange
Queen Anne's	Centreville	6.74	10.85	MD 18 west (4H Park Road) – Queenstown	Eastern terminus of MD 18; officially MD 18C
Queen Anne's	Centreville	7.55	12.15	MD 304 east (Water Street) – Bridgetown	South end of unsigned MD 304 west overlap with MD 213
Queen Anne's	Centreville	7.61	12.25	To MD 304 west (Broadway)	North end of unsigned MD 304 west overlap with MD 213
Queen Anne's	Centreville	8.10	13.04	MD 305 east (Hope Road) to US 301 – Carville	Western terminus of MD 305
Queen Anne's	Church Hill	15.76	25.36	Main Street (MD 19A north) – Church Hill	Southern terminus of MD 19A
Queen Anne's	Church Hill	16.67	26.83	MD 300 east (Sudlersville Road) – Church Hill, Sudlersville	Western terminus of MD 300; officially MD 300A
Queen Anne's	Church Hill	17.09	27.50	MD 19 east (Main Street) – Church Hill	Western terminus of MD 19
Queen Anne's	Kingstown	21.30	34.28	MD 544 east (McGinnes Road) – Crumpton, Millington	Western terminus of MD 544
Kent	Chestertown	23.27	37.45	MD 289 south (Cross Street) – Pomona	Northern terminus of MD 289
Kent	Chestertown	24.22	38.98	MD 291 (Morgnec Road) to MD 20 – Fairlee, Rock Hall, Millington	
Kent		25.45	40.96	MD 297 north (Worton Road) – Worton	Southern terminus of MD 297
Kent		27.66	44.51	MD 561 north (Hassengers Corner Road)	Southern terminus of MD 561
Kent	Kennedyville	32.98– 33.03	53.08– 53.16	MD 855	Sharply curved loop along MD 213
Kent		33.21	53.45	MD 298 (Lambs Meadow Road/Browntown Road) – Still Pond, Coleman, Betterton	
Kent	Locust Grove	34.80	56.01	MD 449 east (Shallcross Wharf Road)	Western terminus of MD 449; corner of MD 213/MD 444 intersection
Kent	Locust Grove	34.89	56.15	MD 444 (Kentmore Park Road/Locust Grove Road) – Kentmore Park	
Kent	Galena	39.02	62.80	MD 290 / MD 313 south (Main Street/Cross Street) to US 301 – Chesterville, Sassafras	Northern terminus of MD 313; officially MD 313A
Cecil	Cecilton	43.81	70.51	MD 282 (Main Street) – Earleville, Warwick	
Cecil	Cayots	50.26	80.89	MD 310 east (Cayots Corner Road)	Western terminus of MD 310
Cecil	Chesapeake City	53.24	85.68	MD 537 north (George Street) to MD 286 / MD 342 – South Chesapeake City	Interchange; southern terminus of MD 537; officially MD 537C
Cecil	Chesapeake & Delaware Canal	53.77	86.53	Chesapeake City Bridge	
Cecil		54.35	87.47	MD 285 east (Biddle Street) – North Chesapeake City	Western terminus of MD 285
Cecil	Elkton	59.09	95.10	US 40 (Pulaski Highway) – Baltimore, Philadelphia	Northern terminus of former US 213
Cecil	Elkton	60.09	96.71	MD 545 north (Elkton Boulevard)	Southern terminus of MD 545
Cecil	Elkton	60.53	97.41	MD 279 (Newark Avenue) to I-95 / US 40	
Cecil	Fair Hill	66.71	107.36	MD 273 (Telegraph Road) – Rising Sun, Newark	
Cecil		68.25	109.84	PA 841 north (Chesterville Road) – Lewisville	Pennsylvania state line; northern terminus of MD 213
1.000 mi = 1.609 km; 1.000 km = 0.621 mi: Concurrency terminus

== Auxiliary route ==
- MD 213A runs along the ramp from MD 537D to southbound MD 213 in Chesapeake City, Cecil County. The route is 0.05 mi (80 m) long.
