= Interstate 285 =

Interstate 285 is the designation for two Interstate Highways in the United States

- Interstate 285 (Georgia), a beltway around Atlanta, colloquially known as the Perimeter (opened 1969)
- Interstate 285 (North Carolina), a connector from Lexington to Winston-Salem (signed 2018)
