= Delaware Route 286 =

State highway in New Castle County, Delaware, United States

Delaware Route 286
- Bethel Church Road
- DE 286 in red

Route information
- Maintained by DelDOT
- Length: 1.73 mi (2.78 km)
- Existed: 1994–present

Major junctions
- West end: MD 286 near Chesapeake City, MD
- East end: DE 15 near Summit Bridge

Location
- Country: United States
- State: Delaware
- Counties: New Castle

Highway system
- Delaware State Route System; List; Byways
← DE 279	→ I-295

Delaware Route 286 (DE 286), also known as Bethel Church Road, is a 1.73-mile (2.78 km) two-lane undivided state highway in New Castle County, Delaware. The route runs from the Maryland border, where the road becomes Maryland Route 286 (MD 286), east to DE 15. The route passes through rural areas with some homes. DE 286, along with MD 286 and DE 15, forms a link between Chesapeake City, Maryland, and Summit Bridge, Delaware. The road was paved in the 1930s and became DE 286 in the 1990s.

== Route description ==
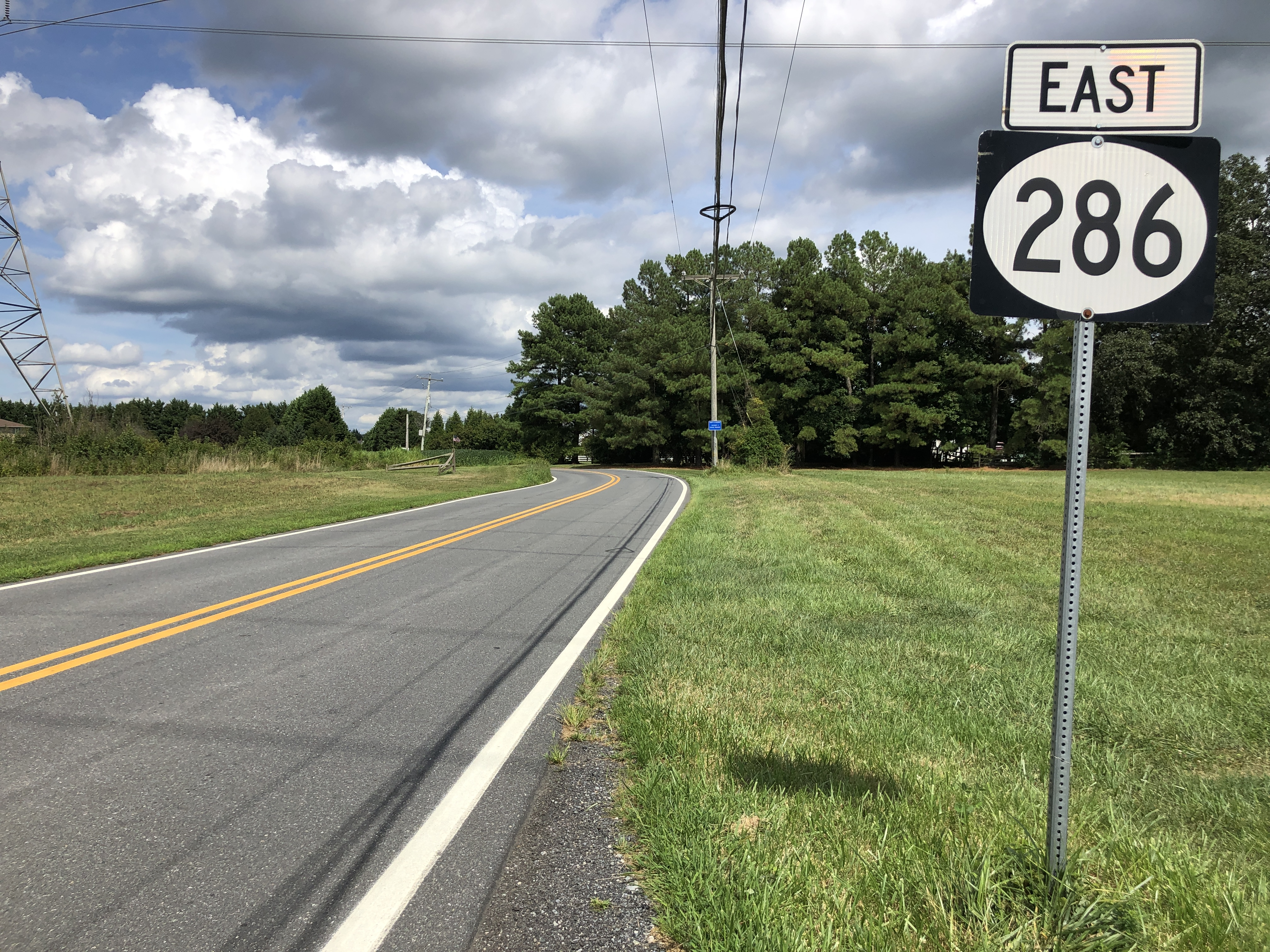
DE 286 eastbound past its western terminus at MD 286 the Maryland state line

DE 286 begins at the Maryland border, where the road continues west into that state as MD 286 toward the town of Chesapeake City, and continues east on two-lane undivided Bethel Church Road through farmland. A short distance later, the road runs between residential developments. The road then passes between homes to the north and rural areas to the south before becoming lined with farms on both sides. DE 286 reaches its eastern terminus at DE 15, which heads south on Choptank Road and northeast on Bethel Church Road, at a roundabout. DE 286 has an annual average daily traffic count of 4,597 vehicles.

== History ==
By 1920, what is now DE 286 existed as an unimproved county road. The road in Delaware was paved by 1936 and served as part of the route between Summit Bridge and Chesapeake City. Bethel Church Road from the state line east to DE 15 was designated DE 286 around 1994, extending the number from MD 286. On November 20, 2009, a roundabout opened at the eastern terminus at DE 15.

== Major intersections ==
The entire route is in New Castle County.

Location	mi	km	Destinations	Notes
	0.00	0.00	MD 286 west (Bethel Road) – Chesapeake City	Maryland state line; western terminus
Summit Bridge	1.73	2.78	DE 15 (Choptank Road/Bethel Church Road)	Roundabout; eastern terminus
1.000 mi = 1.609 km; 1.000 km = 0.621 mi
