= New York State Route 287 =

New York State Route 287 may refer to:

- New York State Route 287 (1930–1970) in Oneida and Herkimer Counties
- New York State Route 287 (1970s) in Jefferson County
