= Chesapeake City Bridge =

Bridge in Maryland, United States

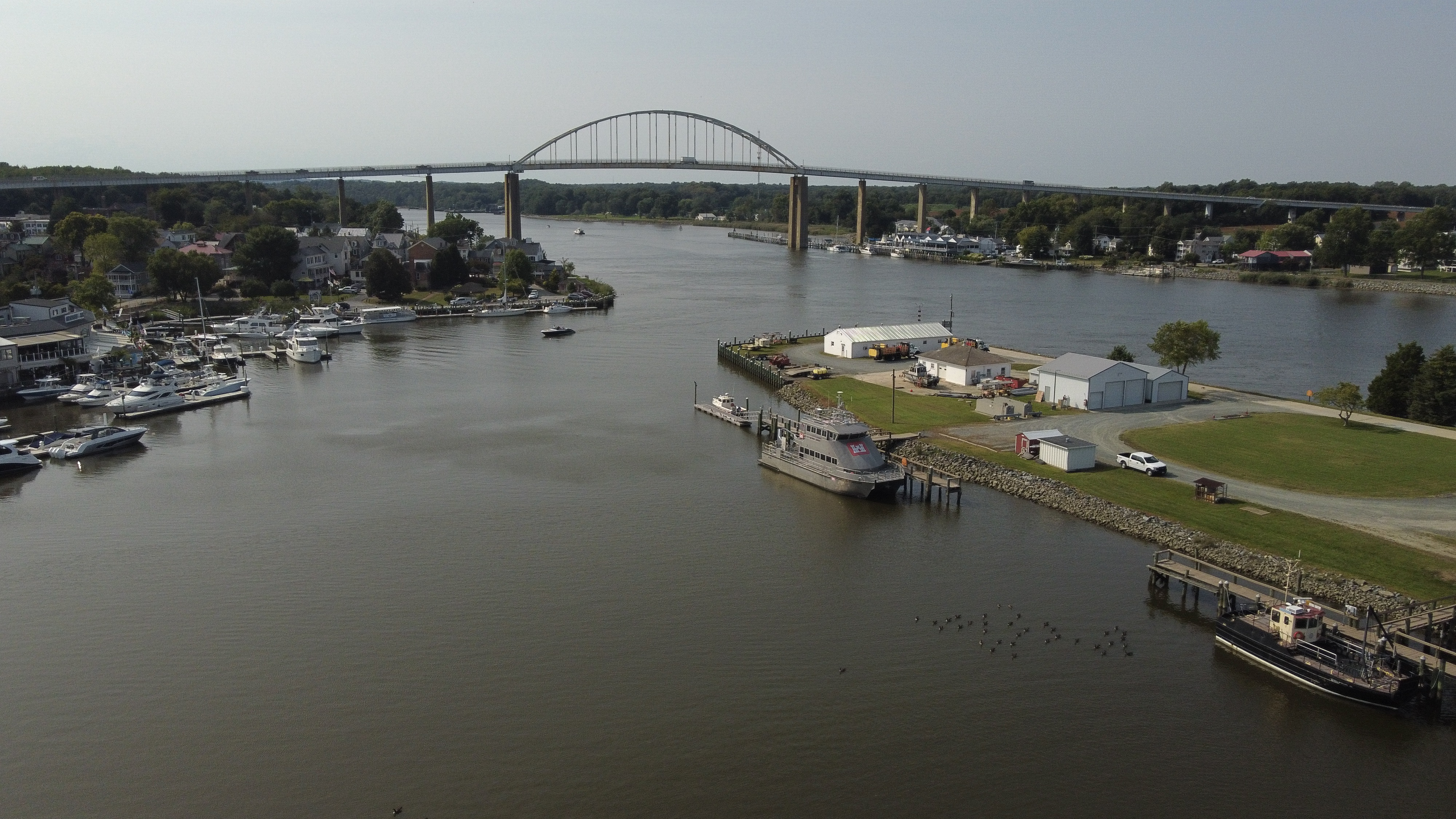
- Coordinates: 39.529053°N 75.813920°W
- Carries: 2 lanes of MD 213, pedestrians
- Crosses: Chesapeake & Delaware Canal
- Locale: Chesapeake City, Maryland
- Maintained by: U.S. Army Corps of Engineers

Characteristics
- Design: tied arch bridge
- Total length: 3,955 ft (1,205 m)
- Width: 29 ft (8.8 m)
- Longest span: 540 ft (160 m)
- Clearance above: 18.5 ft (5.6 m)
- Clearance below: 140 ft (43 m)

History
- Opened: 1949

Statistics
- Daily traffic: 14,350

Location
- Interactive map of Chesapeake City Bridge

The Chesapeake City Bridge carries Maryland Route 213 across the Chesapeake & Delaware Canal in Chesapeake City, Maryland. There are two undivided traffic lanes and one sidewalk on the east side of the bridge. The U.S. Army Corps of Engineers began construction on the bridge in 1948 and it was opened to traffic in 1949. An older vertical lift drawbridge was destroyed on July 28, 1942, after being struck by the tanker Franz Klasen. The bridge is identical in appearance to the old St. Georges Bridge in Delaware (they were constructed roughly at the same time) except for the number of lanes.

== Vertical lift span ==
The Chesapeake City vertical lift span was constructed between 1924 and 1928. The bridge carried U.S. Route 213, connecting George Street on the south side of the canal with Lock Street on the north. Following the destruction of the bridge, the new high-level bridge was constructed approximately 500 feet (150 m) to the west. U.S. Route 213 was diverted to the new bridge, while the surface streets leading to the former bridge site were resigned as Maryland Route 537. This lift bridge itself was a replacement of an earlier wooden swing bridge. The replacement was necessitated by the expansion of the canal in the 1920s.

== See also ==
- List of crossings of the Chesapeake & Delaware Canal
