= South Chesapeake City Historic District =

Historic district in Maryland, United States

- U.S. National Register of Historic Places
- U.S. Historic district
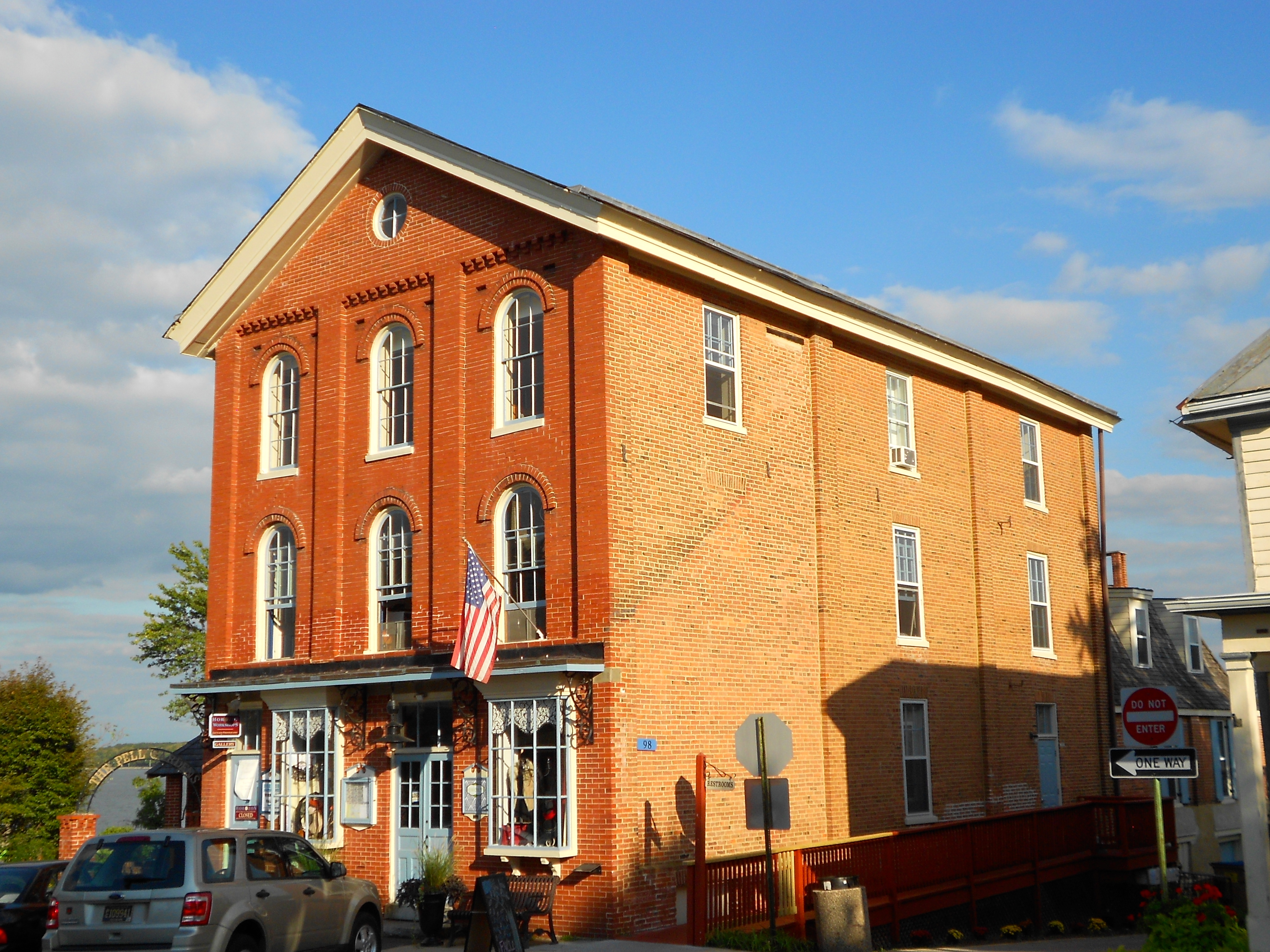
- Building at the corner of 2nd and Bohemian Streets

- Location within Maryland Location within the United States
- Location: E of U.S. 213, S of Chesapeake and Delaware Canal, Chesapeake City, Maryland
- Coordinates: 39°31′37″N 75°48′51″W
- Area: 15 acres (6.1 ha)
- Architectural style: Greek Revival, Italianate, Federal
- NRHP reference No.: 74000944
- Added to NRHP: July 15, 1974

South Chesapeake City Historic District is a national historic district at Chesapeake City, Cecil County, Maryland, United States. It reflects the town's period of greatest prosperity in the mid 19th century when the adjacent Chesapeake and Delaware Canal was an active commercial artery between major east coast waterways. Buildings from the 19th century dominate those few of the early 20th century and those of recent vintage.

It was added to the National Register of Historic Places in 1974.
