= Cecilton, Maryland =

- Town
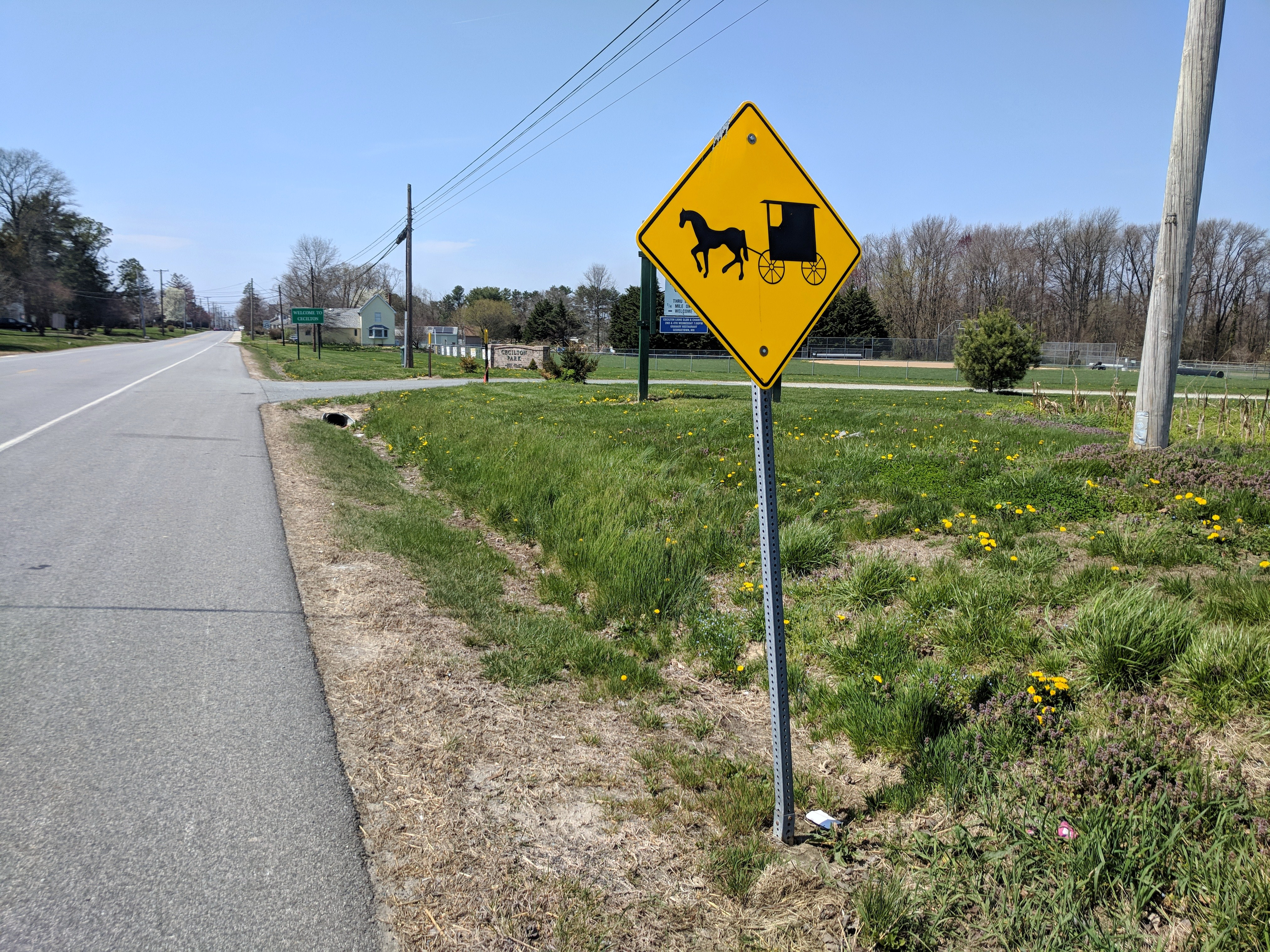
- Amish horse and buggy warning sign, April 2018

- Flag Seal

- Location of Cecilton, Maryland
- Coordinates: 39°24′11″N 75°52′10″W
- Country: United States
- State: Maryland
- County: Cecil
- Incorporated: 1864

Area
  - Total: 0.48 sq mi (1.25 km^{2})
  - Land: 0.48 sq mi (1.25 km^{2})
  - Water: 0 sq mi (0.00 km^{2})
- Elevation: 69 ft (21 m)

Population (2020)
  - Total: 676
  - Density: 1,398.7/sq mi (540.03/km^{2})
- Time zone: UTC-5 (Eastern (EST))
  - Summer (DST): UTC-4 (EDT)
- ZIP code: 21913
- Area code: 410
- FIPS code: 24-14325
- GNIS feature ID: 0583638
- Website: www.ceciltonmd.gov

Cecilton is a town in Cecil County, Maryland, United States. As of the 2020 census, Cecilton had a population of 676.

== Geography ==
Cecilton is located at 39°24′11″N 75°52′10″W (39.402919, -75.869430).

According to the United States Census Bureau, the town has a total area of 0.46 square miles (1.19 km^{2}), all land.

== History ==
The Maryland Legislature incorporated the town in 1864. That May the first officials, Dr. Samuel V. Mace, Wm. T. Weldon, John Morris, Wm. H. Pearce and Edward Seamans, were elected for a one-year term.

It is the location of Greenfields, listed on the National Register of Historic Places in 1972.

== Transportation ==
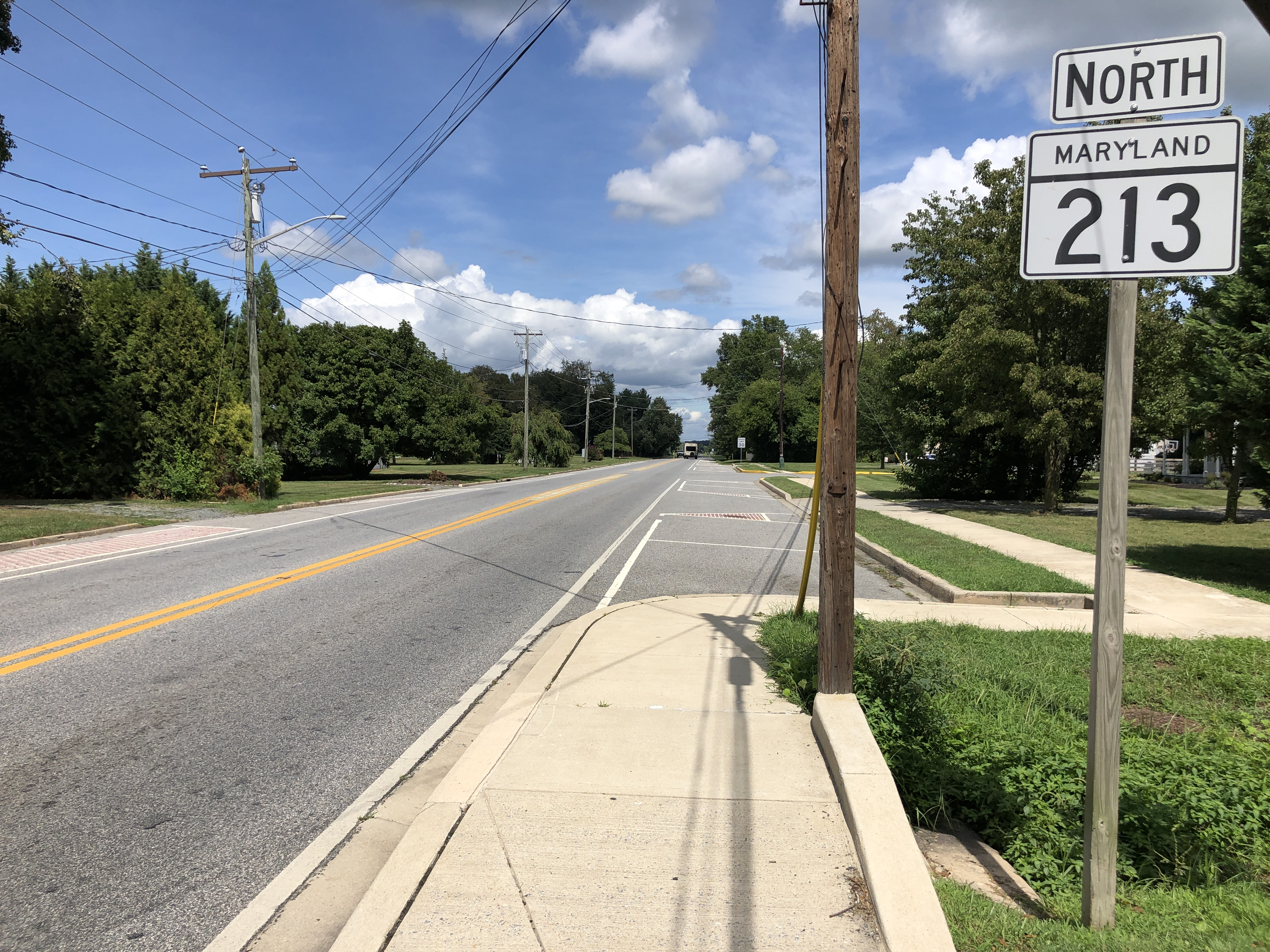
MD 213 in Cecilton

The primary method of transportation to and from Cecilton is by road. Maryland Route 213 is the main north–south highway serving the town, following Bohemia Avenue through the center of the community. To the north, MD 213 connects Cecilton to Chesapeake City and Elkton, while heading south, it passes through Galena and Chestertown, among other communities. The other state highway serving Cecilton is Maryland Route 282, which follows Main Street on an east–west path through town. MD 282 heads west to Crystal Beach, while to the east, it passes through Warwick before crossing into Delaware and becoming Delaware Route 299.

Cecil Transit operates a Demand Response route twice a month between Cecilton and Middletown, Delaware, providing residents of southern Cecil County access to shopping and healthcare in Middletown.

== Demographics ==
Historical population
Census	Pop.	Note	%±
1870	462		—
1880	473		2.4%
1890	485		2.5%
1900	447		−7.8%
1910	518		15.9%
1920	439		−15.3%
1930	458		4.3%
1940	498		8.7%
1950	510		2.4%
1960	596		16.9%
1970	581		−2.5%
1980	508		−12.6%
1990	489		−3.7%
2000	474		−3.1%
2010	663		39.9%
2020	676		2.0%
U.S. Decennial Census

=== 2010 census ===
At the 2010 census, there were 663 people, 237 households and 173 families living in the town. The population density was 1,441.3 per square mile (556.5/km^{2}). There were 264 housing units at an average density of 573.9 per square mile (221.6/km^{2}). The racial make-up of the town was 80.5% White, 11.8% African American, 0.5% Asian, 0.3% Pacific Islander, 4.8% from other races and 2.1% from two or more races. Hispanic or Latino of any race were 7.1% of the population.

There were 237 households, of which 43.9% had children under the age of 18 living with them, 44.7% were married couples living together, 19.4% had a female householder with no husband present, 8.9% had a male householder with no wife present and 27.0% were non-families. 22.4% of all households were made up of individuals and 13.9% had someone living alone who was 65 years of age or older. The average household size was 2.80 and the average family size was 3.19.

The median age was 35.4 years. 27.1% of residents were under the age of 18, 9.8% were between the ages of 18 and 24, 28.2% were from 25 to 44, 22.2% were from 45 to 64 and 12.8% were 65 years of age or older. The sex make-up of the town was 48.1% male and 51.9% female.

=== 2000 census ===
At the 2000 census there were 474 people, 198 households and 129 families living in the town. The population density was 1,054.6 per square mile (407.2/km^{2}). There were 212 housing units at an average density of 471.7 per square mile (182.1/km^{2}). The racial make-up of the town was 74.47% White, 23.21% African American, 1.05% from other races and 1.27% from two or more races. Hispanic or Latino of any race were 4.43% of the population.

There were 198 households, of which 31.3% had children under the age of 18 living with them, 39.4% were married couples living together, 19.2% had a female householder with no husband present and 34.8% were non-families. 30.3% of all households were made up of individuals and 18.7% had someone living alone who was 65 years of age or older. The average household size was 2.39 and the average family size was 2.95.

26.6% of the population were under the age of 18, 6.8% from 18 to 24, 27.8% from 25 to 44, 21.7% from 45 to 64 and 17.1% were 65 years of age or older. The median age was 37 years. For every 100 females, there were 88.8 males. For every 100 females age 18 and over, there were 82.2 males.

The median household income was $38,971 and the median family income was $41,563. Males had a median income of $36,071 and females $23,068 . The per capita income was $21,719. About 8.4% of families and 14.1% of the population were below the poverty line, including 19.8% of those under age 18 and 9.4% of those age 65 or over.

The Cecilton area has a small Amish community that was founded in 1999. Amish families moved to the area from Lancaster County, Pennsylvania, because of increasing costs and the declining amount of farmland there.

== Notable person ==
David Davis, a close adviser to President Abraham Lincoln, was born a few miles outside Cecilton, on March 9, 1815. He was appointed to the Supreme Court in 1862 and served until 1877, when he resigned to become the U.S. senator from Illinois.
