= Cecil County Public Schools =

School district in Maryland, USA

Address
- 201 Booth Street Elkton, Maryland, 21921; United States

District information
- Type: Public
- Grades: PreK–12
- Superintendent: Dr. Jeffrey Lawson

Other information
- Website: www.ccps.org

Cecil County Public Schools is a public school system serving the residents of Cecil County, Maryland. Demographics, assessments, and statistics are available on the Maryland Report Card website.

It is the school district for the entire county.

In 2023, it was concluded that Cecil County Public Schools was 17th in local funding compared to other counties in the state. The budget Cecil County Public Schools increased by over 50 million dollars between FY 20 and FY 24.

== High schools ==
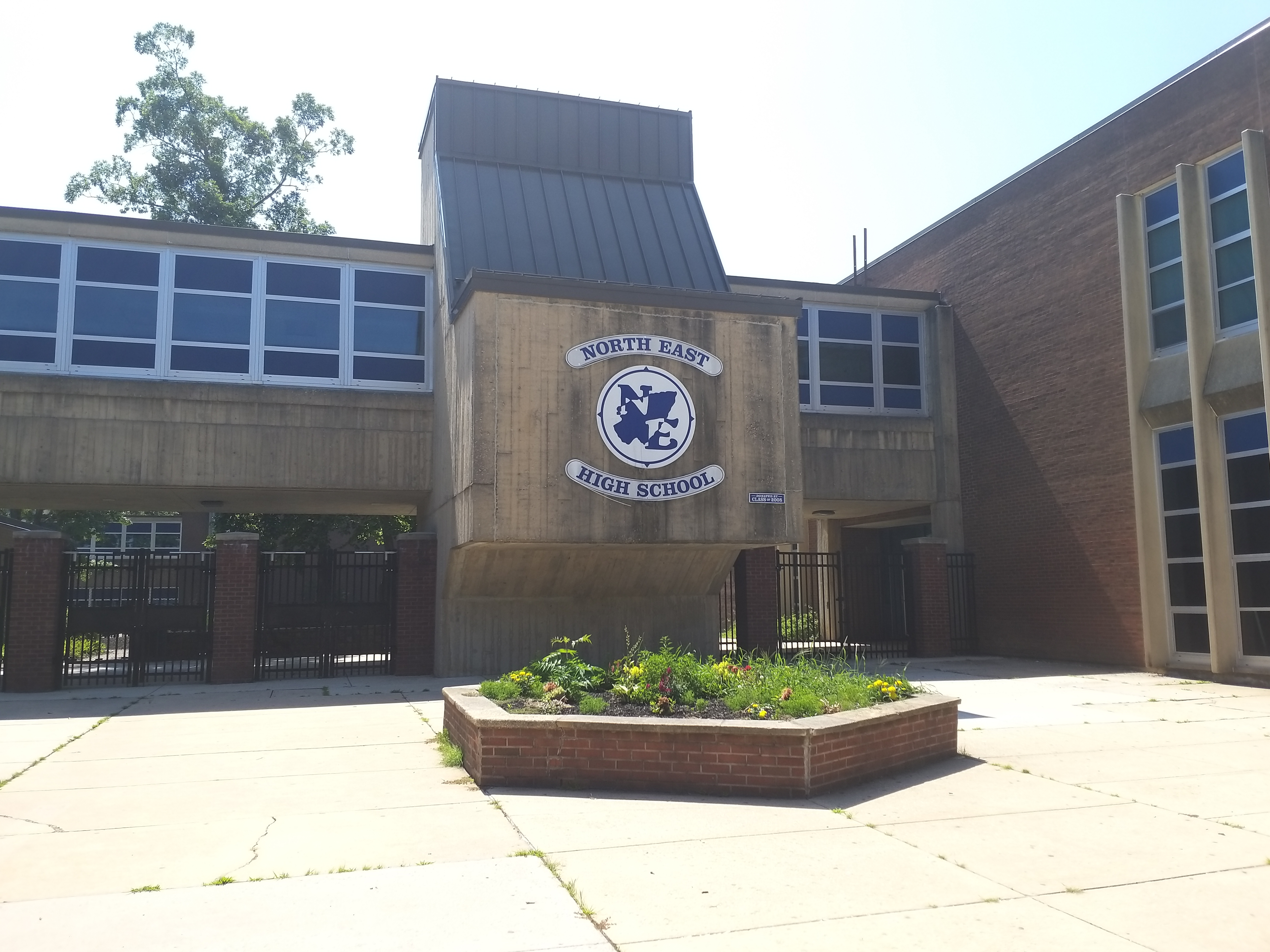
North East High School

- Bohemia Manor High School, Chesapeake City, MD
- Elkton High School, Elkton, MD
- North East High School, North East, MD
- Perryville High School, Perryville, MD
- Rising Sun High School, North East, MD
- Cecil County School of Technology, Elkton, MD
  - Cecil County School of Technology offers vocational studies, trainings, and certifications to high school students. Students attend one of the above Cecil County high schools while taking supplemental courses at the School of Technology.

== Middle schools ==
- Bohemia Manor, Chesapeake City, MD
- Cherry Hill, Elkton, MD
- Elkton, Elkton, MD
- North East, North East, MD
- Perryville, Perryville, MD
- Rising Sun, Rising Sun, MD

== Elementary schools ==
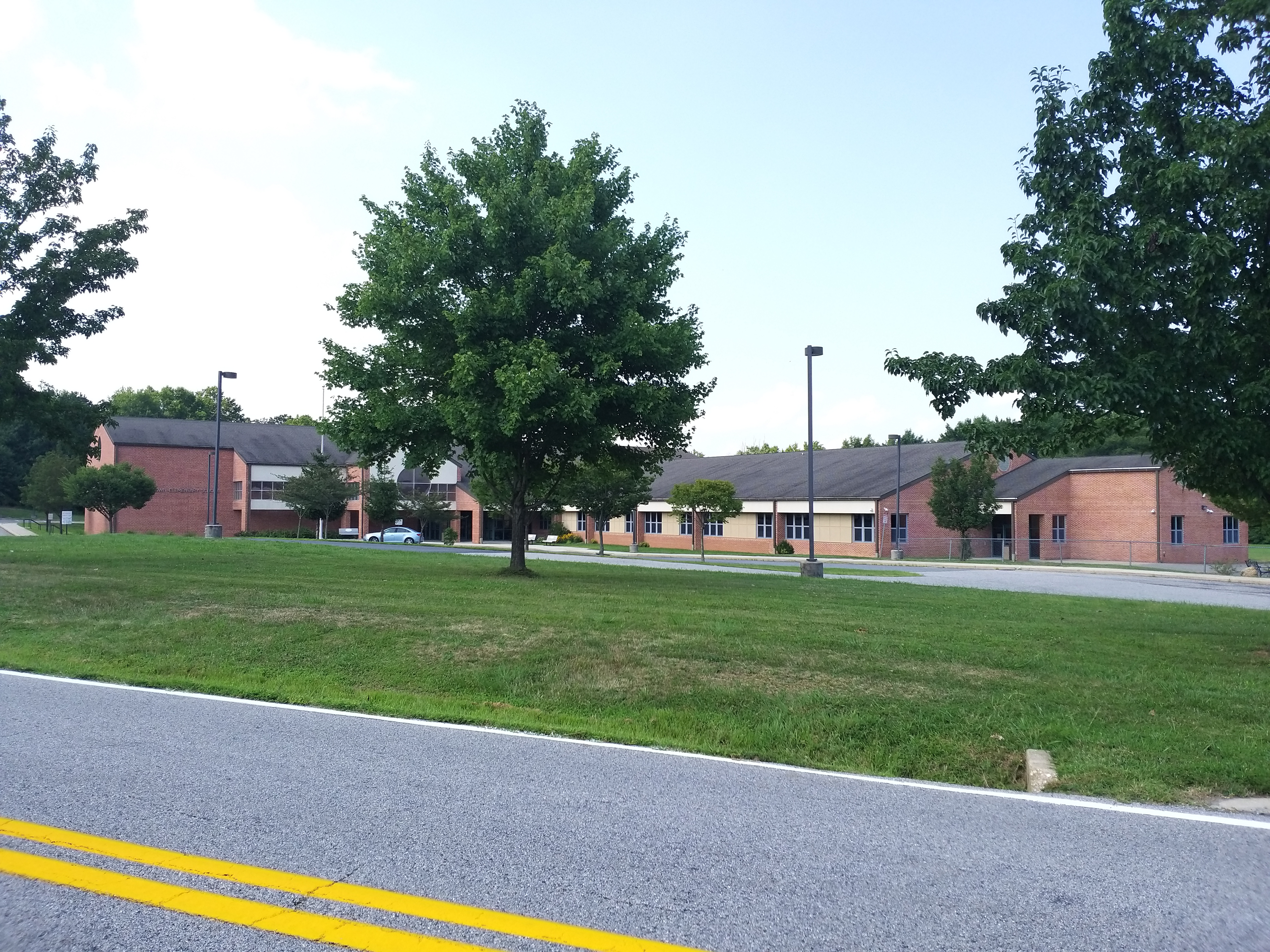
Charlestown Elementary School

- Bainbridge, Port Deposit
- Bay View, North East
- Calvert, Rising Sun
- Cecil Manor, Elkton
- Cecilton, Cecilton
- Charlestown, Charlestown
- Chesapeake City, Chesapeake City
  - The previous facility, about 42,000 square feet (3,900 m^{2}) in size, is in the southern part of Chesapeake City, along the Chesapeake & Delaware Canal. In 2019 a groundbreaking for the new school facility, along Augustine Herman Highway at the midpoint between the Bohemia Manor secondary schools and the Cheseapeake City fire department facility, was imminent. The facility, with about 62,000 square feet (5,800 m^{2}) in area, is designed to look like the area bridge. The building's model is Gilpin Manor Elementary School.
- Conowingo, Conowingo
- Elk Neck, Elkton
- Gilpin Manor, Elkton
- Holly Hall, Elkton
- Kenmore, Elkton
- Leeds, Elkton
- North East, North East
- Perryville, Perryville
- Rising Sun, Rising Sun
- Thomson Estates, Elkton

== Other ==
- Cecil Alternative Program at Providence, Elkton, MD

== News ==
Cecil County School of Technology

In the fall of 2015, the new Cecil County School of Technology opened in Elkton, MD.

In 2018, the New Gilpin Manor Elementary School opened next to the original building which was over 60 years old. The original building has since been razed.

In 2021, the New Chesapeake City Elementary School opened as part of the same campus where Bohemia Manor Middle School and High School exist. The original building was located closer to downtown Chesapeake City.

In 2021, Cecil County Public Schools announced they would construct a new shared campus for North East Middle School and High School which will be located near the current high school.

== Funding Controversies ==
On October 27, 2023, Cecil County Public Schools alerted affected fine arts teachers their programs may be cut the following school year because the county executive was developing a budget that would slash CCPS funding, in turn cutting funding for the Fine Arts to the minimum required by Maryland law. This caused outrage amongst students, parents, and the greater community, including actions taken across social media and planning mass public uproar at upcoming Board of Education meetings and town hall events.

After the 2024 Cecil County Elections, resulting in the incumbent County Executive Danielle Hornberger losing her reelection bid, Cecil County Public Schools was able to avoid making any major budget cut as a Cecil County budget was passed sufficiently funding Cecil County Public Schools.
