= Göring telegram =

1945 message sent by Hermann Göring to Adolf Hitler

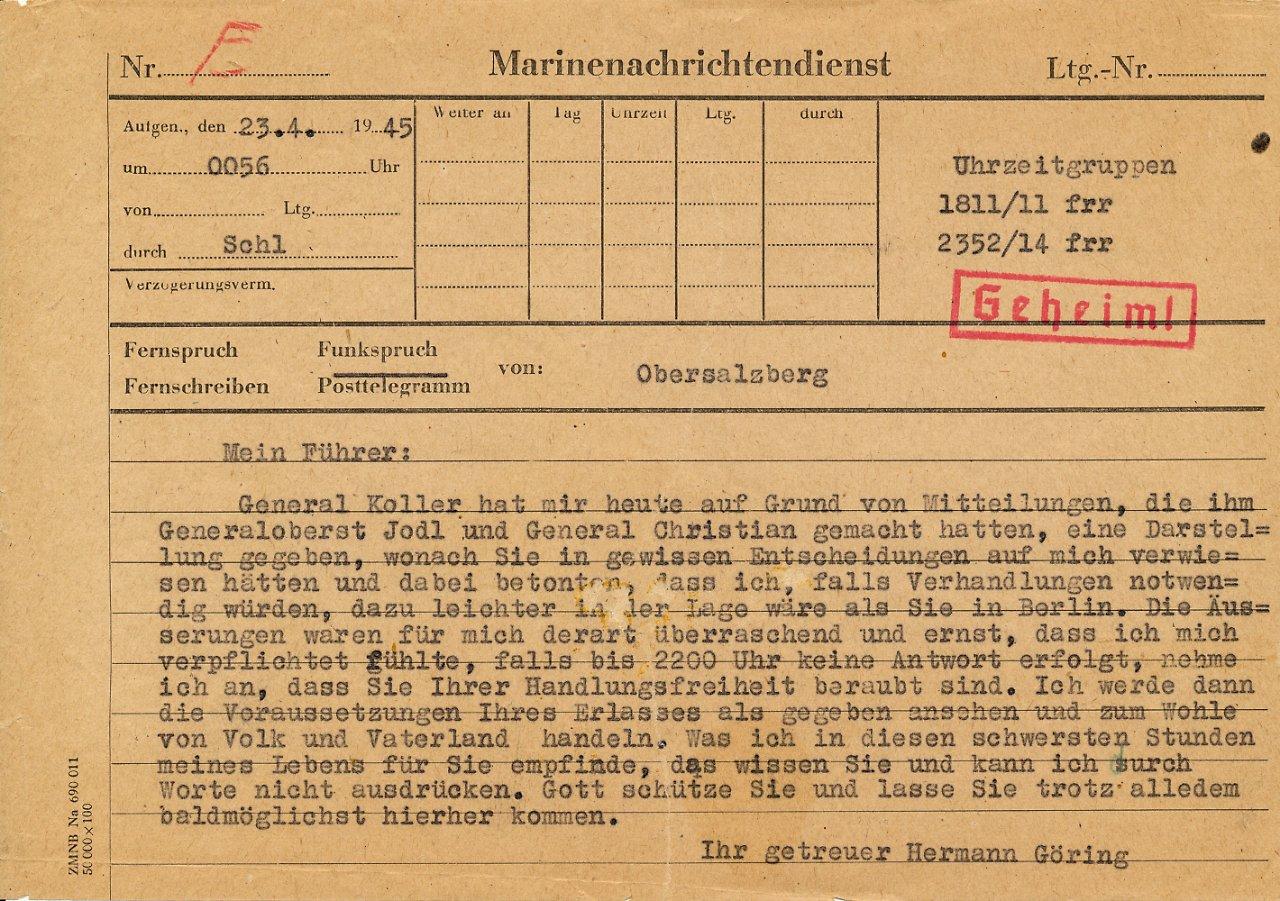
- Copy printed at the Führerbunker
- Created: 23 April 1945
- Location: Obersalzberg; Führerbunker; The Citadel, The Military College of South Carolina
- Author: Hermann Göring
- Media type: Telegram
- Purpose: To inform Hitler that Göring was prepared to take command of the Greater German Reich should Hitler relinquish it

Full text
- de:Göring an Hitler über dessen Nachfolge-Erlass at Wikisource

The message known as the Göring telegram was sent by Hermann Göring, head of the Luftwaffe and Adolf Hitler's designated successor as leader of Nazi Germany, to Hitler that asked for permission to assume leadership of the crumbling regime on 23 April 1945. The telegram caused an infuriated Hitler to immediately strip Göring of power and to appoint new successors, Joseph Goebbels and Karl Dönitz, as chancellor and head of state, respectively.

== Göring as Hitler's political heir ==
Hermann Göring had been the second most-powerful man in the Nazi Party for some time before Hitler came to power in 1933, having joined the party in 1922 and been wounded during the Beer Hall Putsch in 1923. During the early years of Hitler's regime, Göring continued to pile on titles at will, including President of the Reichstag, Minister-President and acting Reichsstatthalter ('governor') of Prussia, and Reich Minister of Aviation and commander-in-chief of the Luftwaffe.

On 1 September 1939, on the outbreak of the Second World War with Germany's invasion of Poland, Hitler made a speech stating that Göring would succeed him "if anything should befall me". That status was underscored in a 1940 decree, naming Göring as Reichsmarschall des Grossdeutschen Reiches (Reich Marshal of the Greater German Reich), a specially created rank that was second only to Hitler's position of Supreme Commander. On 29 June 1941, one week into Operation Barbarossa, Hitler issued a secret decree that formally stated that if he ever lost his freedom of action, by way of incapacity, disappearance or abduction, Göring was to act as his deputy, with full power to act on Hitler's behalf.

== Göring's "duty" ==
On 21 April 1945, the Soviet Red Army had advanced into Berlin. Hitler, Martin Bormann and Joseph Goebbels remained in the Führerbunker, the Nazi leadership's underground complex near the Reich Chancellery, to lead the defense of the capital against the Soviets. Göring left Berlin and moved to the south, reaching his estate at Obersalzberg on 22 April. The same day, upon learning that an order to counterattack the Soviet forces had not been obeyed, Hitler went into a lengthy diatribe against his generals and publicly admitted, for the first time, that the war was lost. Hitler announced that he intended to remain in Berlin to the end and then to commit suicide. He also stated that Göring was in a better position to negotiate a peace settlement.

When the Luftwaffe's chief of staff, Karl Koller, heard about Hitler's statement from Alfred Jodl, operations chief of the Oberkommando der Wehrmacht (OKW), he immediately flew to the Obersalzberg to notify Göring of the news. If Göring was to lead peace negotiations, Koller felt that there was no time to waste. Additionally, he wanted to prevent the Allies from intercepting a radio message.

Although Göring had for some time been looking forward to the day he would succeed Hitler, he was taken by surprise at this development. Göring feared being branded a traitor if he tried to take power, but he also feared being accused of dereliction of duty if he did nothing. He reviewed his copy of the 1941 decree, which not only designated him as Hitler's successor but also vested him with complete authority to act on Hitler's behalf if Hitler ever lost his freedom of action. After conferring with Koller and Hans Lammers, the state secretary of the Reich Chancellery, Göring concluded that by remaining in Berlin to face certain death, Hitler had incapacitated himself from governing. All agreed that under the terms of the decree, if Hitler had indeed lost his freedom of action, it would be incumbent upon Göring to take power in Hitler's stead.

On 23 April, Göring sent a carefully worded telegram, asking Hitler to confirm that he was indeed to become the leader of Germany in accordance with the 1941 decree. He added that if Hitler did not reply by 22:00 that night, he would assume Hitler had lost his freedom of action and so would assume leadership of the Reich as Hitler's deputy.

== Hitler's reaction ==
Upon the telegram's arrival by radiogram from the Obersalzberg at 00:56 on 23 April 1945, Bormann, who controlled access to Hitler, seized upon it as evidence of Göring's intent to launch a coup d'état, claiming that the telegram was not a request for permission to assume power in accordance with the decree but a demand to resign or be overthrown. Hitler, according to Albert Speer, originally did not show much reaction to the telegram, responding with a bleakness that had come over him in recent days during the Battle of Berlin. However the words of both Goebbels and Bormann stirred up a more fiery response not seen in him in weeks, even months.

According to Speer, the telegram initiated a crisis in the form of Hitler's psychological breakdown, which precipitated the political disintegration of military command and control as the Reich collapsed. A number of telegrams from Göring to various officers that referred to his invocation of Hitler's secret testament sent Hitler into a rage. Speer noted one in particular in which Göring directed Ribbentrop to report to him if neither he nor Hitler sent further communication before midnight.

On 25 April, Hitler issued a telegram to Göring telling him that he had committed "high treason" and gave him the option of resigning all of his offices "for reasons of health", in exchange for his life. Göring subsequently resigned. However, Bormann soon ordered the SS in Obersalzberg to arrest Göring. On 28 April, Hitler discovered that Reichsführer-SS Heinrich Himmler was also trying to discuss surrender terms with the Allies. He ordered Himmler's arrest and had Hermann Fegelein, Himmler's representative in the Führerbunker, who had previously been caught attempting to desert, shot.

Hitler's last will and testament was written on 29 April and was prompted by Hitler receiving Göring's telegram, news of Himmler's attempted negotiations of surrender with the Allies, and reports that Red Army troops were within a block or two of the Reich Chancellery. In the document, Hitler dismissed Göring from all of his offices, cancelled his succession rights and expelled him from the Nazi Party. It was dictated by Hitler to his secretary, Traudl Junge, on the day that he and Eva Braun married. Hitler and Braun committed suicide the next day.

The new political succession divided power between Goebbels and Grand Admiral Karl Dönitz, commander-in-chief of the Kriegsmarine and chief of the Naval High Command, who would become President (Reichspräsident) of Germany; Goebbels, the appointed Reichskanzler, committed suicide with his family on May 1.

== Postwar discovery ==
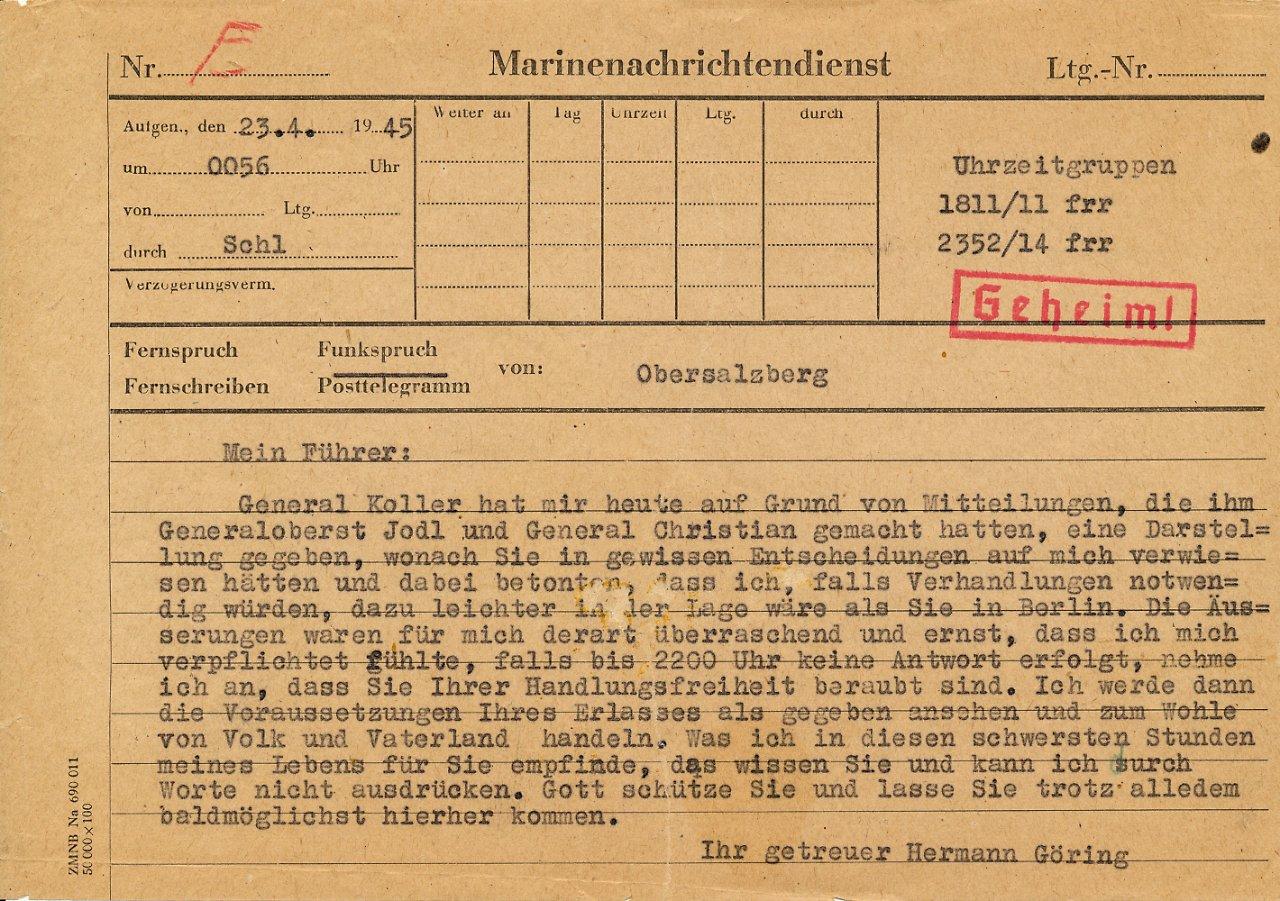
The copy found by Captain Bradin

Upon its reception in the Führerbunker, the Göring telegram was typed onto a Marinenachrichtendienst ('Naval Intelligence') form with a carbon copy and classified "Geheim!" (Secret!). After the Soviet capture of Berlin, U.S. officials entered the Führerbunker and took away papers and documents, which were analysed by historians.

In July 1945, Captain Benjamin M. Bradin entered the Führerbunker and discovered an original carbon copy of the telegram, marked with an 'F' in a group of Hitler's papers; the copy was given in later years to Robert W. Rieke, a professor of history at the Citadel.

== Trevor-Roper's translation ==
British historian Hugh Trevor-Roper published an early English translation of the Göring telegram in his book The Last Days of Hitler:

My Führer:

General Koller today gave me a briefing on the basis of communications given him by Colonel General Jodl and General Christian, according to which you had referred certain decisions to me and emphasized that I, in case negotiations would become necessary, would be in an easier position than you in Berlin. These views were so surprising and serious to me that I felt obligated to assume, in case by 2200 o'clock no answer is forthcoming, that you have lost your freedom of action. I shall then view the conditions of your decree as fulfilled and take action for the wellbeing of Nation and Fatherland. You know what I feel for you in these most difficult hours of my life and I cannot express this in words. God protect you and allow you despite everything to come here as soon as possible.

Your faithful Hermann Göring.

== 2015 purchase ==
On 7 July 2015, at the Alexander Historical Auction in Stamford, Connecticut, United States, an unnamed buyer purchased the telegram for $54,675.

== Sources ==
- Beevor, Antony (2002). Berlin – The Downfall 1945. New York: Viking-Penguin Books. ISBN 978-0-670-03041-5.
- Evans, Richard J. (2008). The Third Reich at War. New York: Penguin. ISBN 978-0-14-311671-4.
- Joachimsthaler, Anton (1996). The Last Days of Hitler. Translated by Bögler, Helmut. London: Arms and Armour. ISBN 1-85409-380-0.
- Kershaw, Ian (2008). Hitler: A Biography. New York City: W. W. Norton & Company. ISBN 978-0-393-06757-6. LCCN 2008037294. OCLC 1285564274. OL 22551194M. Wikidata Q138306767.
- Shirer, William Lawrence (1960), The Rise and Fall of the Third Reich: A History of Nazi Germany, New York City: Simon & Schuster, ASIN B0766DKDLR, LCCN 60006729, OCLC 1286630, OL 5794925M, Wikidata Q138029595
