= Guthrie Branch (C and D Canal tributary) =

Guthrie Branch Tributary to C and D Canal
- Location within Delaware Location within the United States

Location
- Country: United States
- State: Delaware
- County: New Castle

Physical characteristics
- Source: Long Creek divide
  - location: about 0.2 miles east of Pencader Farms, Delaware
  - coordinates: 39°33′26″N 075°44′47″W
  - elevation: 70 ft (21 m)
- Mouth: C and D Canal
  - location: about 1.5 miles east of Chesapeake City, Maryland
  - coordinates: 39°32′25″N 075°45′38″W
  - elevation: 0 ft (0 m)
- Length: 2.11 mi (3.40 km)
- Basin size: 2.21 square miles (5.7 km^{2})
- Discharge
  - average: 2.75 cu ft/s (0.078 m^{3}/s) at mouth with C and D Canal

Basin features
- Progression: generally south
- River system: C and D Canal
- Tributaries
  - left: unnamed tributaries
  - right: unnamed tributaries
- Bridges: Frazer Road, Chesapeake City Road

Guthrie Branch is a 2.11 mi (3.40 km) long 1st order tributary to C and D Canal in New Castle County, Delaware.

== Variant names ==
According to the Geographic Names Information System, it has also been known historically as:

- Guthrie Run

== Course ==
Guthrie Branch rises on the Long Creek divide about 0.2 miles east of Pencader Farms in New Castle County, Delaware. Guthrie Branch then flows south to meet the C and D Canal about 1.5 miles east of Chesapeake City, Maryland.

== Watershed ==
Guthrie Branch drains 2.21 square miles (5.7 km^{2}) of area, receives about 44.9 in/year of precipitation, has a topographic wetness index of 652.80 and is about 26.2% forested.

== See also ==
- List of rivers of Delaware
