= Bohemia Manor High School =

Location
- 2655 Augustine Herman Highway; Chesapeake City, Maryland; United States; 39°30′38″N 75°49′51″W

Information
- Type: Public Secondary
- Motto: Home of the Bo Manor Eagles
- Established: 1958
- School district: Cecil County Public Schools
- Principal: Anthony Evans
- Grades: 9–12
- Enrollment: 650 (2016-17)
- Campus: Rural
- Colors: Red and black
- Mascot: Eagles
- Website: www.ccps.org/bmhs

Bohemia Manor High School is a public school operated by Cecil County Public Schools located approximately 1 mile (1.6 km) south of the small town of Chesapeake City in Cecil County, Maryland, United States. This is a small school of 685 students which shares its campus with Bohemia Manor Middle School. This school serves the Maryland communities of Chesapeake City, Cecilton, Earleville and parts of Elkton south of U.S. Route 40. The school is also known by the nickname Bo Manor.

== Origin of the school ==
The opening of Bohemia Manor High School replaced Chesapeake City High School and Cecilton High School. In 1949, the board of education considered consolidating Chesapeake City High School and Cecilton High School to form one high school to serve southern Cecil County. However it was not until 1956 that construction began. Construction was completed and the school opened in 1958. The final Chesapeake City and Cecilton High School graduation ceremonies took place during June 1958 and the first Bohemia Manor High School graduation ceremony occurred during June 1959. This brand new school would house grades 7th through 12th. The first Principal was Samuel Dixon. In 1996, grades 6th through 8th were made to form Bohemia Manor Middle School. Grades 9th through 12th would remain in Bohemia Manor High School.

The former Chesapeake City High School and Cecilton High School became elementary schools in September 1958 after the final high school graduation ceremonies in June.

=== Origin of the school's name ===
In the 17th century, a surveyor named Augustine Herman made one of the first maps of Cecil County, where the school resides. In the 18th century, a plantation called Bohemia Manor was located only a few miles from the school grounds.

== Principals ==
- Samuel Dixon, 1958–1960
- James Prigel, 1960–1962
- Ralph Wachter, 1962–1968
- Kenneth Dollenger, 1968–1970
- Paul Simmers, 1970–1973
- Terrill Stammler, 1973–1983
- Robert Poole, 1983–1988
- Delbert Jackson, 1988–1997
- Gary Richardson, 1997–1998
- Randy Sheaffer, 1998–2007
- Charles (Chip) Helm, 2007–2011
- John Roush Jr., 2011–2013
- Niklas (Skippy G) Haraldson, 2013–2019
- Justin Zimmerman, 2019-2025
- Anthony Evans, 2025-

== Extra-curricular ==
=== Athletics ===
Fall: Volleyball, Football, Boys' Soccer, Girls' Soccer, Field Hockey, Cross Country, Golf, Cheerleading.

Winter: Boys' Basketball, Girls' Basketball, Wrestling, Indoor Track.

Spring: Tennis, Track, Baseball, Softball, Lacrosse.

==== Championships ====
- In 2016 the boys' cross country team won their fourth IA state title.
- In 2011 the girls' cross country team won their fourth straight IA state title and the boys won their third.
- In 2010 the girls' cross country team won their third straight IA State Championship.
- In 2009 the girls' Field Hockey Team lost the Maryland State IA Championship game to Pokomoke High School.
- In 2009 the boys' and girls' cross country teams repeated as Maryland State IA Champions.
- In 2009 the baseball team won the IA state Championship.
- In 2008 the boys' and girls' cross country teams won the Maryland State IA Championship.
- In 2007 the Bo Manor boys' soccer team lost the IA State Championship game.
- In 2006 the Bo Manor Baseball Team lost the Maryland State Championship game to Snow Hill High School.
- In 2004, 2005, 2006, the girls' field hockey team were Susquehanna Division champions with a record of (18–0) over the last three years.
- In 2002 the Bo Manor football team won the state championship
- In 2001 the Bo Manor boys' soccer team won the County Championship
- In 2001 the Bo Manor boys' soccer team won the County Championship and also Regional Championships

=== Clubs and activities ===
National Honors Society, Tri-M Music Honors Society, Drama Club, Student Council, Interact Club, All-Girls Chorus, Concert Band, Concert Choir, Spanish Club, French Club, Diversity Club, Boosters Club, Future Business Leaders of America (FBLA), Fellowship of Christian Athletes (FCA), Prom Committee, Spirit of Bohemia Marching Band.

== Notable alumni ==
- John Mabry (Class of 1988) – Professional Baseball Player for the Chicago Cubs and the St.Louis Cardinals.
