= Old Lock Pump House, Chesapeake & Delaware Canal =

- U.S. National Register of Historic Places
- U.S. National Historic Landmark
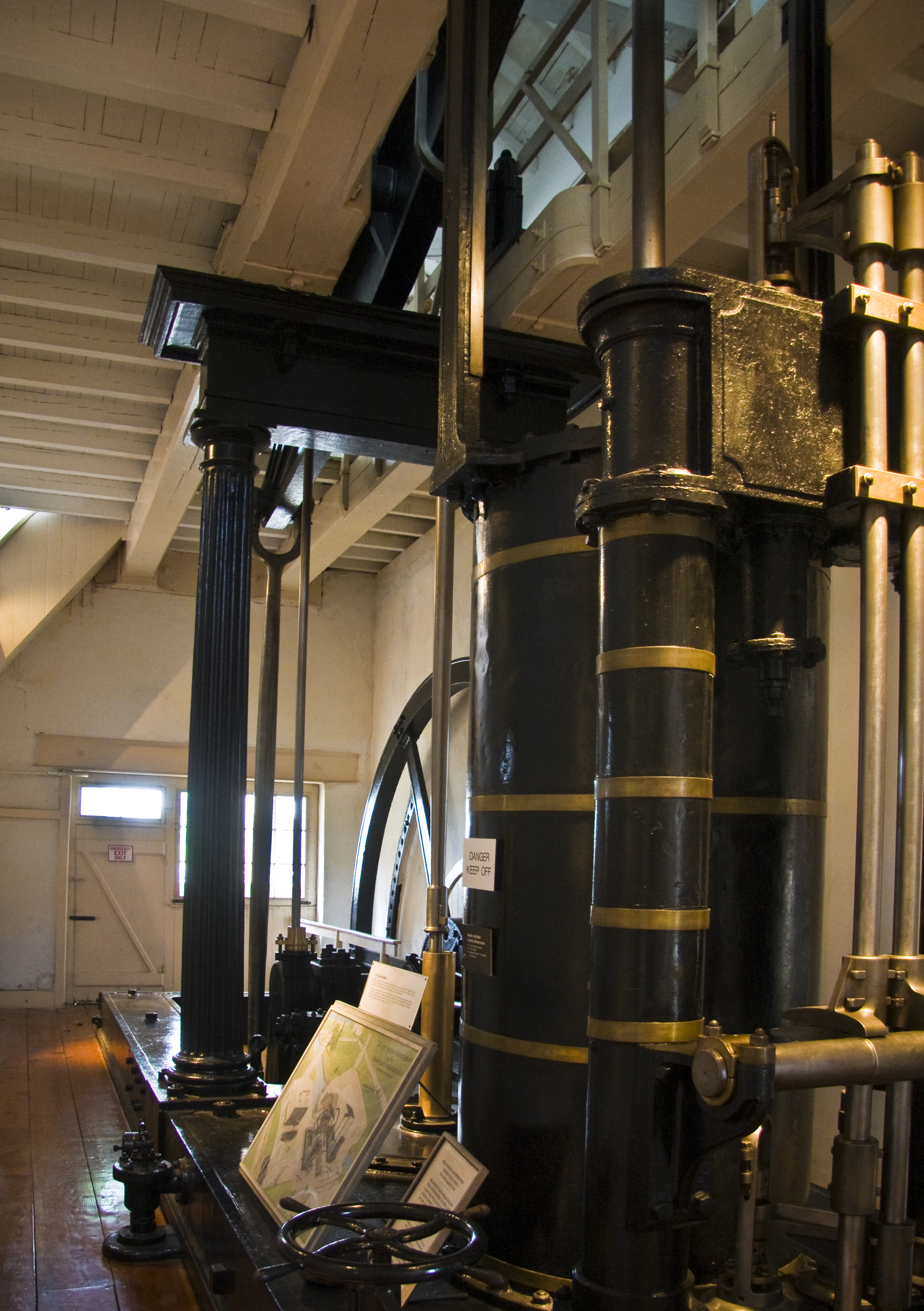

- Location within Maryland Location within the United States
- Location: Chesapeake City, Maryland
- Coordinates: 39°31′32″N 75°48′39″W
- Built: 1829
- NRHP reference No.: 66000390

Significant dates
- Added to NRHP: October 15, 1966
- Designated NHL: January 12, 1965

The Old Lock Pump House on the Chesapeake & Delaware Canal was one of the first National Historic Landmarks to recognize an engineering achievement rather than an important building or a place associated with an historic event. The pump house, whose first element was built in 1837, preserves a feature of the old canal, which relied on locks and pumps to move vessels over the low divide of the Delmarva Peninsula between Chesapeake Bay and Delaware Bay. Because there are no large rivers on the peninsula, water had to be pumped uphill to fill the upper canal and locks. When the canal was cut deeper in the twentieth century, such measures were no longer required, and the pump house is one of the last relics of the old canal.

== Description ==
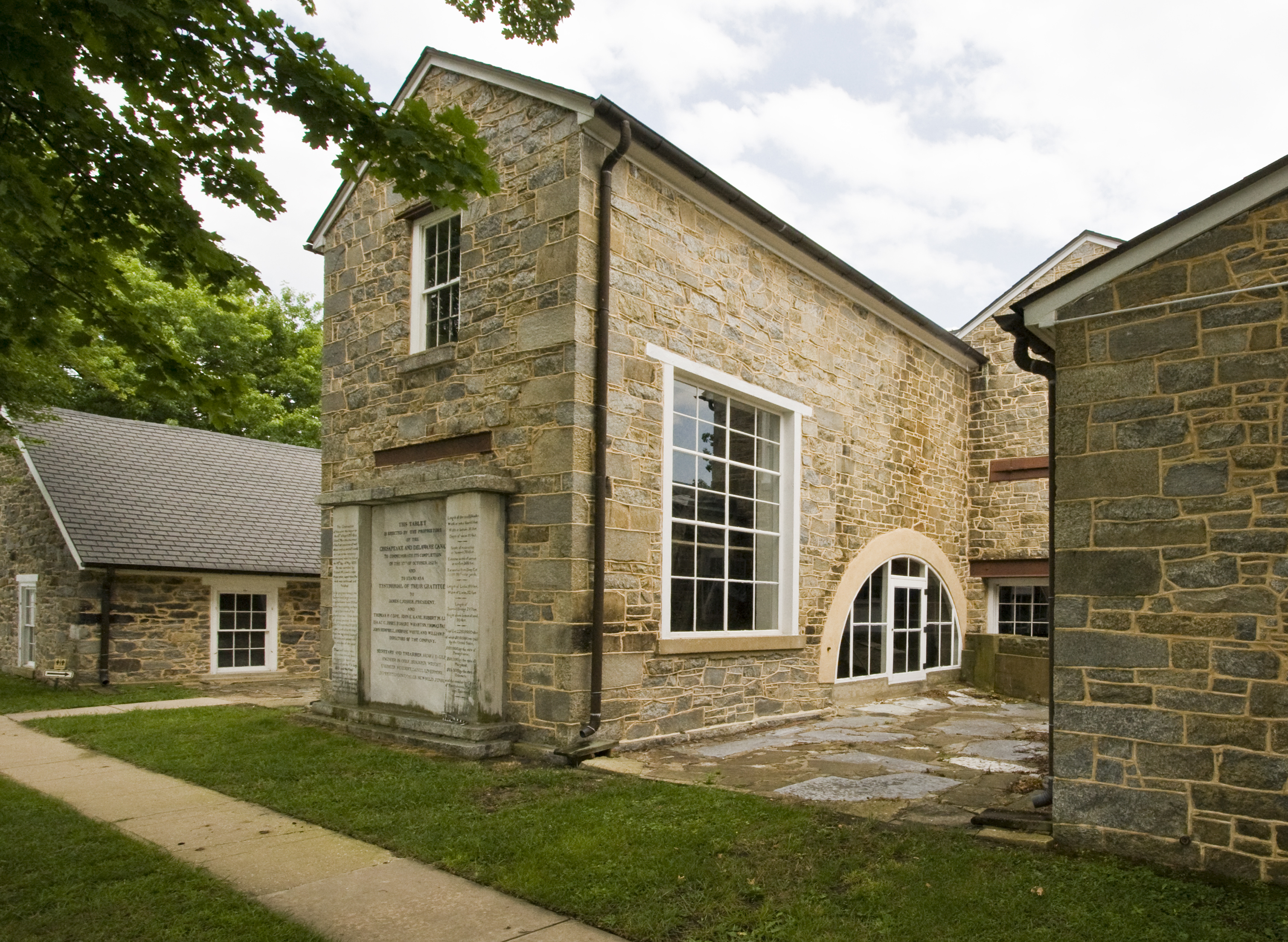
Exterior of pumphouse

The landmark district is part of a row of buildings at the Back Creek Mooring Basin on the south side of the basin in Chesapeake City, Maryland. The buildings were built between 1837 and 1854 of fieldstone, brick and clapboard.

The oldest and easternmost building is the Old Steam House (1837), which housed the original boiler and steam engine. The one-story fieldstone building has an asphalt shingle roof and is used for storage. The next oldest building, the westernmost, was built circa 1851 as the boiler house for the rest of the complex. Immediately to the east is the West Engine Building, also from 1851. The engine house contains one of the two Merrick single-cylinder steam engines. The interior of the structure is supported by cast iron columns. From the outside this appears to be a two-story structure, but is a single space inside. The East Engine Building, opposite the Wheel House, is similar in nature, but was built in 1853 or 1854. In the center, the Wheel House (1851) contains a 39 feet (12 m) lift wheel, 10 feet (3.0 m) wide, made of cypress, white oak and iron. The wheel could move 20,000 US gallons (76,000 L) per minute at 1.5 rpm.

The building is now operated as the C&D Canal Museum, also known as the Chesapeake & Delaware Lock Canal Museum, by the U.S. Army Corps of Engineers.

== Gallery ==
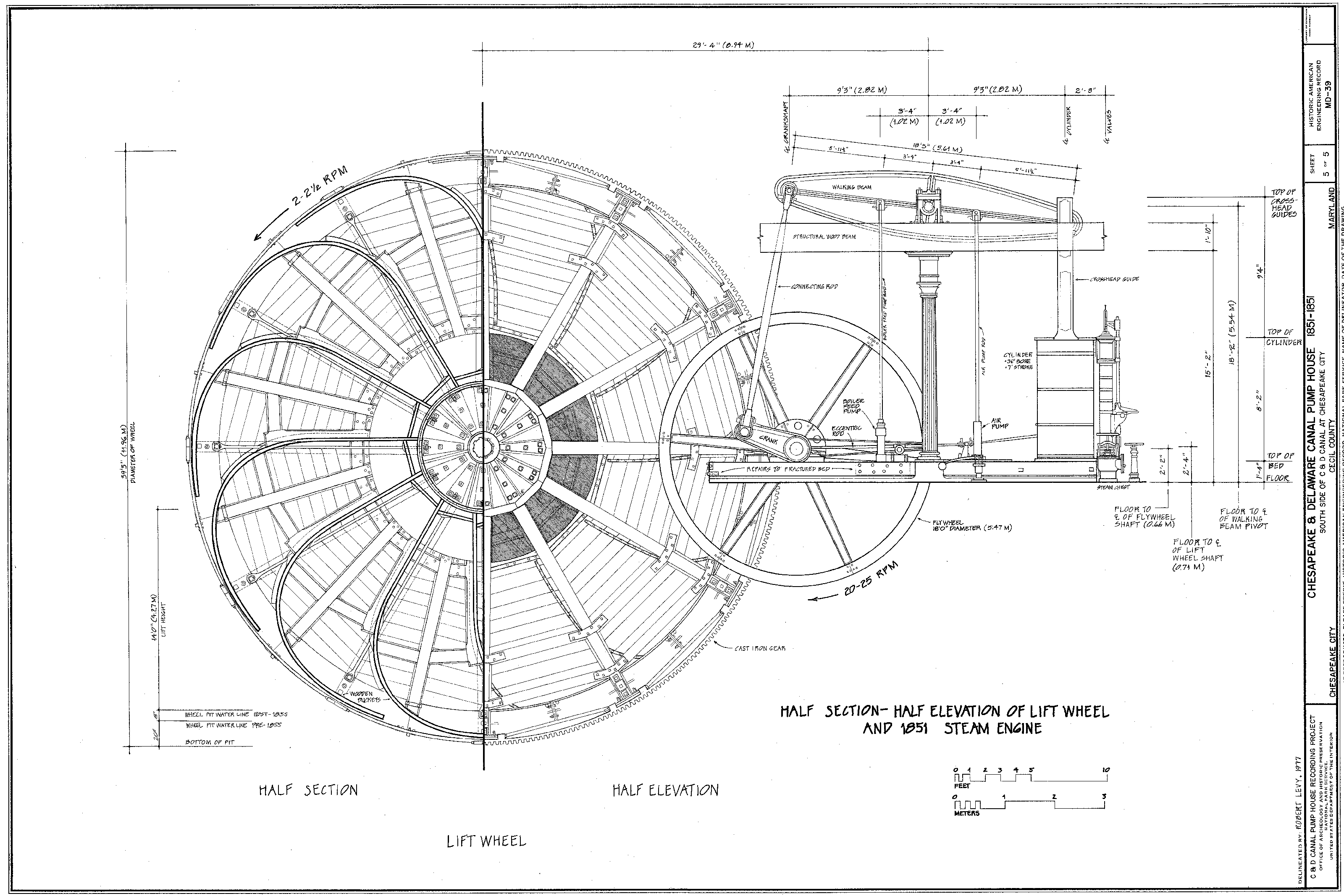
HAER drawing of lift wheel and engine

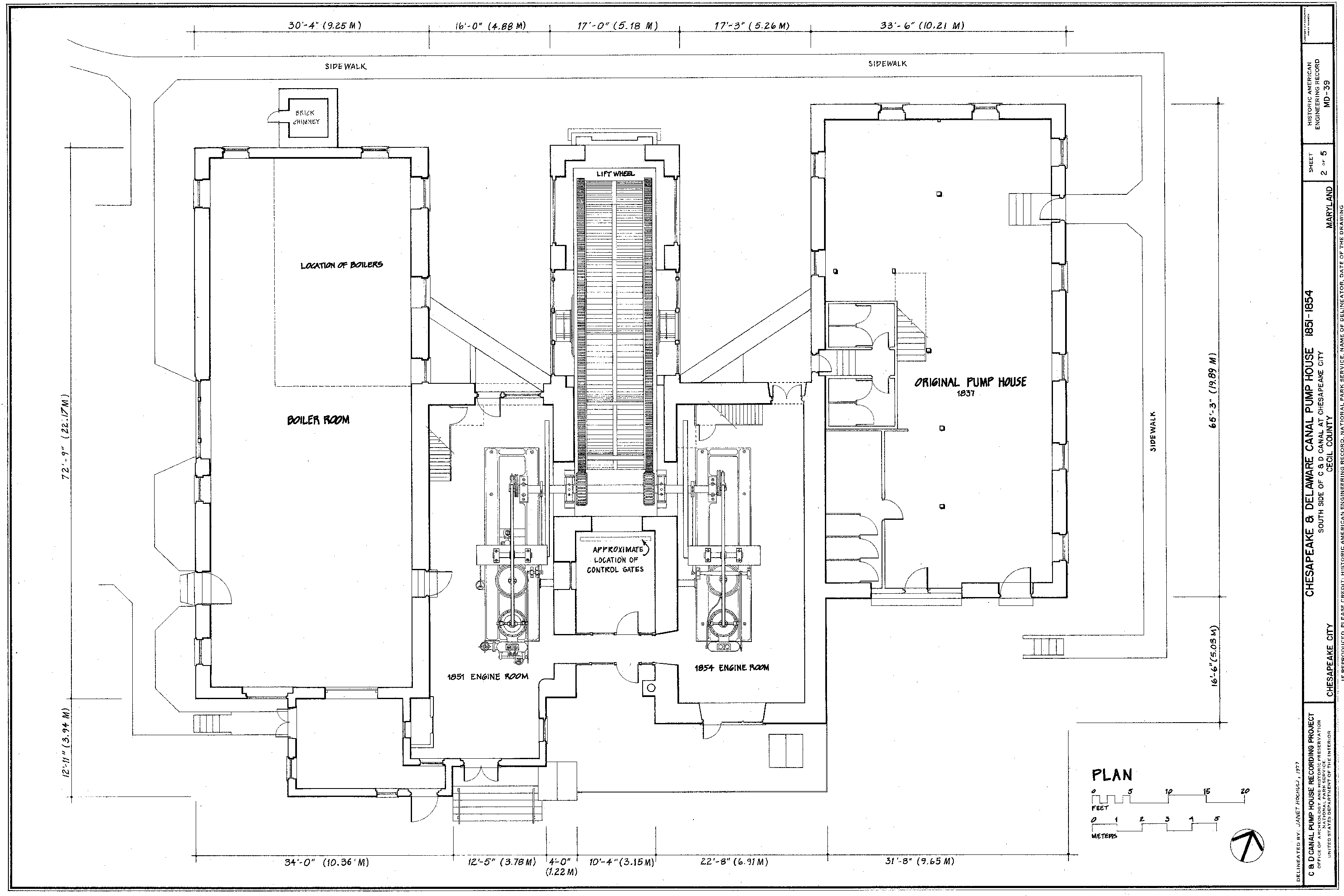
HAER plan drawing
