= North East High School (Maryland) =

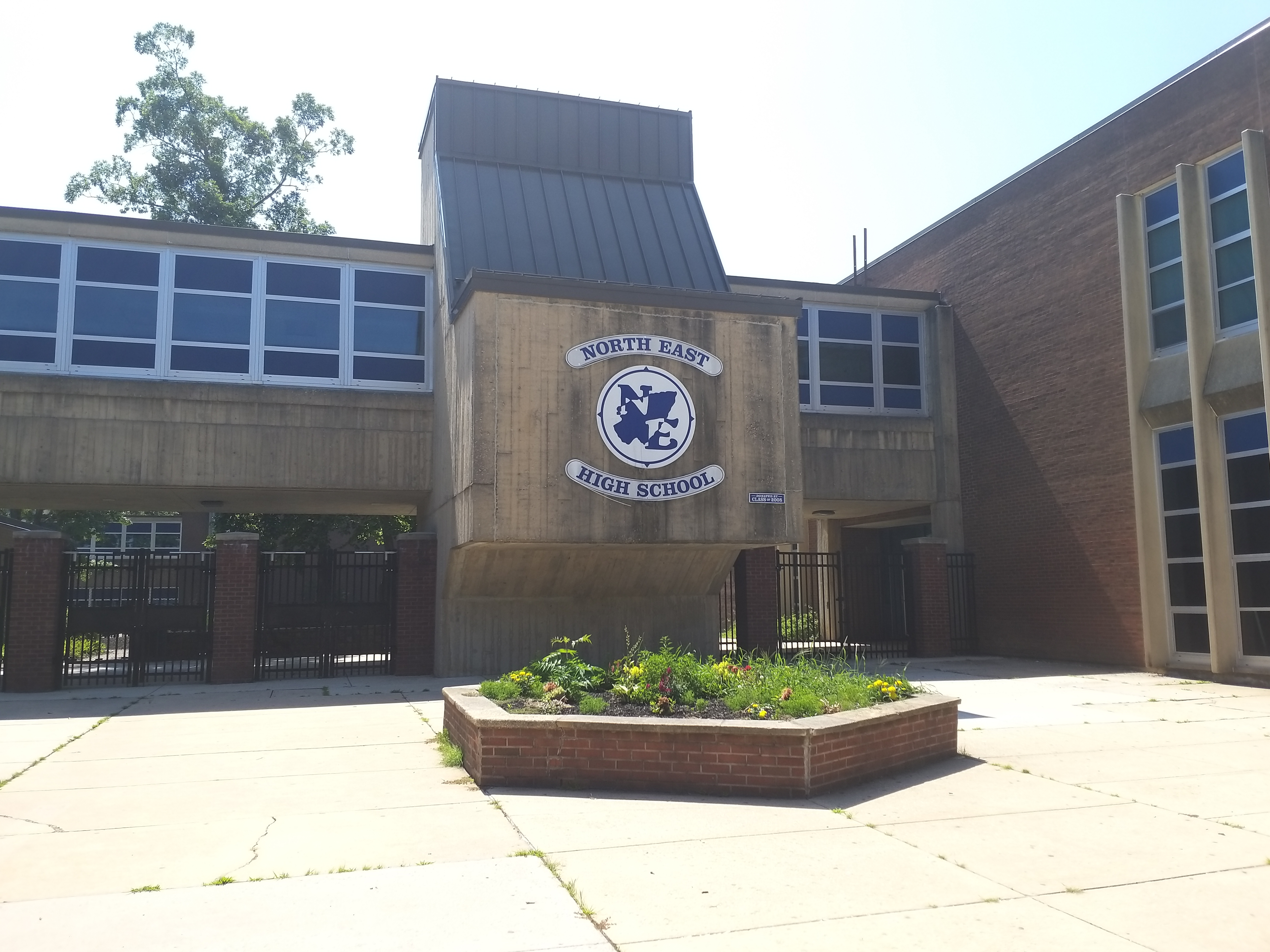

Location
- 300 Irishtown Road; North East, Maryland 21901; United States
- Coordinates: 39.5852°N 75.9333°W

Information
- Type: Public high school
- Established: 1898; 127 years ago
- School district: Cecil County Public Schools
- NCES School ID: 240024000575
- Teaching staff: 72.67 FTE (2022-23)
- Grades: 9–12
- Gender: Co-educational
- Enrollment: 1,069 (2022-23)
- Student to teacher ratio: 14.71 (2022-23)
- Campus type: Rural
- Color(s): Blue and white
- Mascot: Indian
- Website: www.ccps.org/nehs

North East High School (NEHS) is a public high school in North East, Maryland on 300 Irishtown Road. It is part of the Cecil County Public Schools system.

== History ==
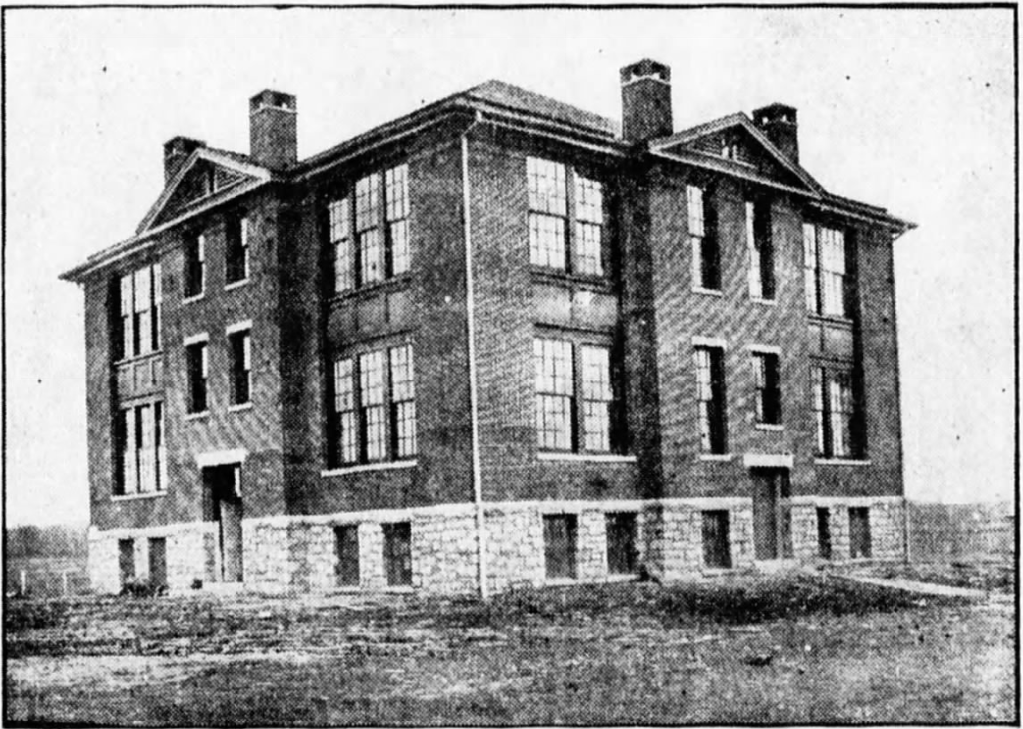
North East High School in 1906

North East High School was first begun in 1898 as a section of the town's existing schoolhouse. The first graduation ceremony was held in 1901. In 1906, the school moved into a newly constructed two-story building. The high school occupied the second floor, while lower grades were taught in the first floor.

In 2021, the Cecil County government announced plans to combine North East High School and North East Middle School into a middle/high school complex. The existing North East High School building will be demolished, and a new athletic complex will be built in its place. The project will cost an estimated $178 million.
