= Chesapeake & Delaware Canal Lift Bridge =

Bridge in Delaware, United States

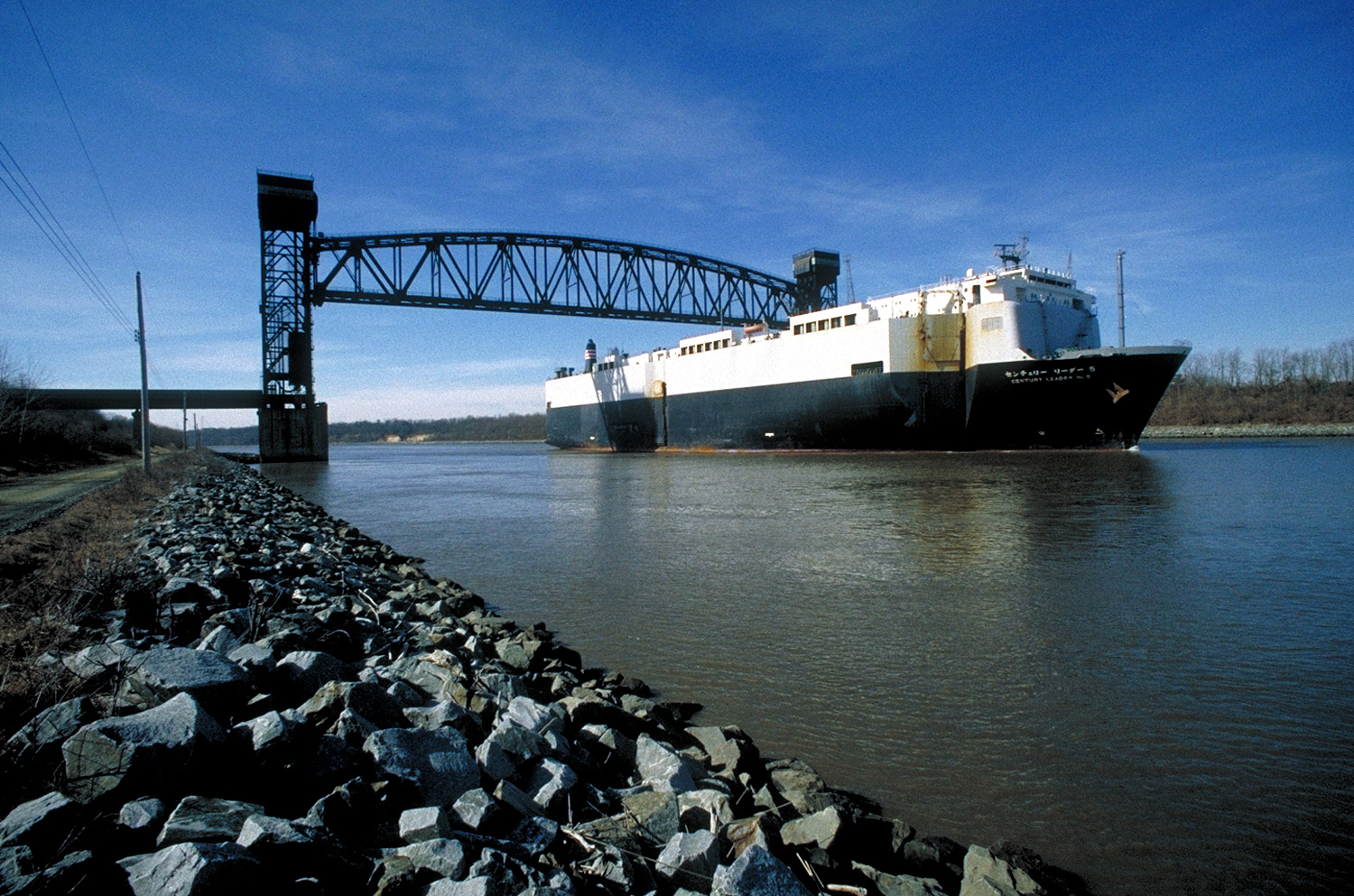
- The Chesapeake & Delaware Canal Lift Bridge
- Coordinates: 39°32′36″N 75°42′10″W
- Carries: 1 Delmarva Central Railroad rail line
- Crosses: Chesapeake & Delaware Canal
- Maintained by: Delmarva Central Railroad

Characteristics
- Design: Vertical-lift bridge

History
- Opened: 1966

Location
- Interactive map of Chesapeake & Delaware Canal Lift Bridge

The Chesapeake & Delaware Canal Lift Bridge is a railroad bridge with vertical-lift span in the U.S. state of Delaware. It carries a Delmarva Central Railroad rail line across the Chesapeake & Delaware Canal.

This bridge was built by the U.S. Army Corps of Engineers as part of a canal expansion project and opened in 1966. The Canal Lift Bridge, the only drawbridge on the C & D Canal (other lift bridges, carrying vehicular traffic, had since been replaced with high-level crossings) was owned and operated by the Pennsylvania Railroad, Penn Central, and Conrail before Norfolk Southern acquired ownership of it in 1998 and the Delmarva Central Railroad took over in 2016. The bridge is used primarily by Delmarva Central Railroad on its Delmarva Subdivision, which has a junction with Norfolk Southern north of the bridge in Porter. Norfolk Southern trains use the bridge via trackage rights to interchange with the Delmarva Central Railroad in Clayton. It has also been used by Amtrak for special events held throughout the year including NASCAR races at Dover International Speedway and the Delaware State Fair, with the trains departing from 30th Street Station in Philadelphia and using Amtrak's Northeast Corridor to the Bell Junction near Edgemoor, then departing a short distance later on the Shellpot Branch and later the Delmarva Branch.

The bridge carries a single track across the canal and is kept open to allow the free flow of shipping traffic underneath. If a freight train plans on crossing the canal in either direction, the engineer must contact the bridge operator at least 30 minutes before crossing, as to allow the bridge to be lowered. Most canal crossings occur at night when most of the shipping traffic (along with Amtrak and SEPTA train traffic farther north) is at a minimum. The northern approach to the Canal Lift Bridge bisects an abandoned section of the C & D Canal, which was bypassed in the 1960s with the current sea-level channel.

On March 18, 2020, it was announced that the Chesapeake & Delaware Canal Lift Bridge would be refurbished as part of an $18.8 million federal grant to the Delmarva Central Railroad.

== See also ==
- List of crossings of the Chesapeake & Delaware Canal
