= Rising Sun High School (Maryland) =

Public school in North East, Maryland, US

Location
- 100 Tiger Drive; North East, Maryland 21901; USA
- Coordinates: 39°41′28″N 75°58′17″W

Information
- Type: Public school
- Motto: "Engage, Inspire, Empower"
- Established: 1931
- Grades: 9–12
- Gender: Coed
- Enrollment: 1,172 (2016-17)
- Colors: Orange and Black
- Mascot: Tiger
- Team name: Rising Sun Tigers
- Accreditation: Maryland State Department of Education
- Affiliation: CCPS
- Website: Rising Sun High School website

Rising Sun High School is a public high school located in North East, Maryland. It is a member of Cecil County Public Schools.
