= Perryville High School (Maryland) =

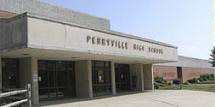
- The front entrance of the building.

Location
- 1696 Perryville Road; Perryville, Maryland 21903; United States
- Coordinates: 39.58223°N 76.06319°W

Information
- Type: Public Secondary
- Motto: The Panther Way
- Established: 1928
- School district: Cecil County Public Schools
- Principal: Kimberly Williams
- Grades: 9–12
- Enrollment: 802 (2016-17)
- Campus: Rural
- Colors: Blue and Gold
- Mascot: Panther
- Newspaper: "Panther Patrol"
- Yearbook: The Pack
- Website: https://www.ccps.org/pvhs

Perryville High School is a public secondary school in Perryville, Maryland, United States. The school is operated by Cecil County Public Schools. Enrollment for 2015 is reported as 810 students.

== Sports ==
- Boys: Baseball, Basketball, Cross Country, Football, Golf, Lacrosse, Soccer, Tennis, Track and Field, Wrestling, Swim
- Girls: Cheerleading, Dance, Basketball, Cross Country, Field Hockey, Golf, Lacrosse, Soccer, Softball, Tennis, Track and Field, Volleyball, Swim

In 2016, the Perryville Panthers completed an undefeated season in softball to win the state championship. June 7 was made the Perryville High School softball team day in honor of this accomplishment.

Perryville High School's marching band has 10 straight Maryland state 1A Championship titles and many other awards.
