= John Mabry =

American baseball player & coach (born 1970)

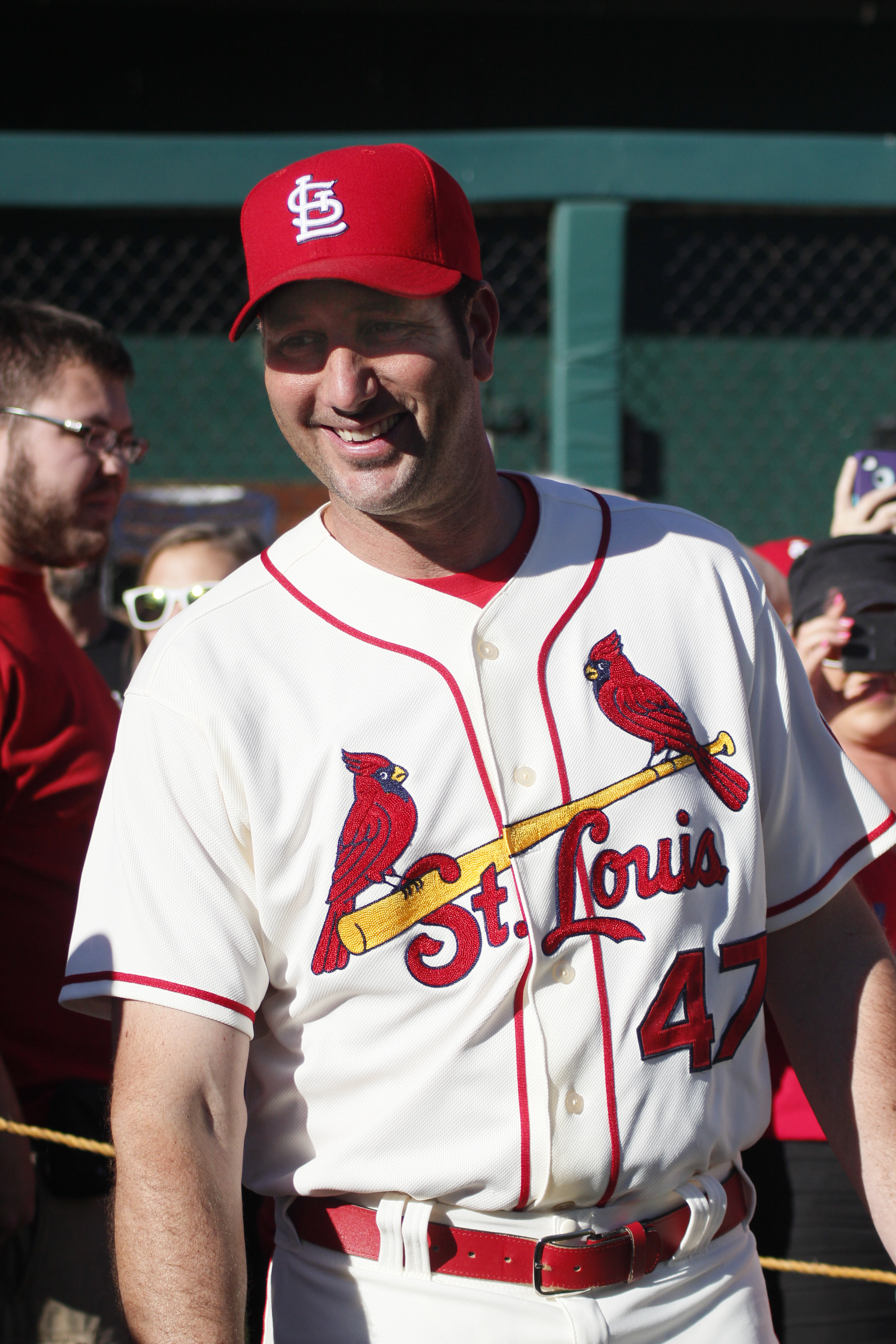
- Mabry with the St. Louis Cardinals in 2013

Los Angeles Angels – No. 87
- Outfielder / First baseman / Hitting coach
- Born: October 17, 1970 (age 56); Wilmington, Delaware, U.S.
- Batted: Left Threw: Right

MLB debut
- April 23, 1994, for the St. Louis Cardinals

Last MLB appearance
- May 17, 2007, for the Colorado Rockies

MLB statistics
- Batting average: .263
- Home runs: 96
- Runs batted in: 446
- Stats at Baseball Reference

Teams
- As player: St. Louis Cardinals (1994–1998); Seattle Mariners (1999–2000); San Diego Padres (2000); St. Louis Cardinals (2001); Florida Marlins (2001); Philadelphia Phillies (2002); Oakland Athletics (2002); Seattle Mariners (2003); St. Louis Cardinals (2004–2005); Chicago Cubs (2006); Colorado Rockies (2007); As coach: St. Louis Cardinals (2012–2018); Kansas City Royals (2020–2022); Miami Marlins (2023–2024); Baltimore Orioles (2025); Los Angeles Angels (2026–present)

John Steven Mabry (/ˈmeɪbriː/ MAY-bree; born October 17, 1970) is an American former professional baseball outfielder and broadcaster, who currently serves as an assistant hitting coach for the Los Angeles Angels of Major League Baseball (MLB).

Mabry had 898 career hits in 3,409 at-bats (for a batting average of .263), with 96 home runs and 446 RBI. He is 6 ft 4 in (1.93 m) tall, weighs 210 lb (95 kilograms), bats left-handed and throws right-handed. Mabry attended West Chester University and was inducted into their Athletics Hall of Fame.

== Early life ==
Mabry, a graduate of Bohemia Manor High School, in Chesapeake City, Maryland, played three years at West Chester University.

== Playing career ==
Mabry played for eight teams in his 14-year MLB career, including three stints with the Cardinals (1994–1998, 2001, 2004–2005).

Mabry was selected by the St Louis Cardinals in 6th round of the 1991 MLB draft. He made his MLB debut on April 23, 1994, against the Houston Astros, where had a his first career hit, a double. Mabry appeared in six games in 1994, hitting .304 in those games. In 1995, Mabry hit his first career home run against the Montreal Expos on July 3. He finished 4th in Rookie of the Year voting. In 1996, Mabry's only season with over 400 at-bats, he led the Cardinals with 161 hits and was fourth in the National League for first basemen in fielding percentage at .994 and was errorless in 14 games in the outfield. He hit for a natural cycle in a May 18, 1996, loss to the Colorado Rockies. On June 3, 1997, Mabry had six RBI in a 15–4 win over Colorado. Then, on June 14, Mabry homered in both games of a doubleheader against the Cleveland Indians.

Mabry was one of the few major leaguers who preferred not to wear batting gloves. He was also somewhat versatile on defense, playing more than 100 games at left and right field as well as first and third base. He also made two career appearances pitching with dubious results. In one inning of work, he gave up seven earned runs for a career ERA of 63.

== Post-playing career ==
In April 2011, Fox Sports Midwest hired Mabry to serve as baseball analyst during St. Louis Cardinals live pre-game and post-game shows, a role he shared with former Cardinals Mike Matheny and Cal Eldred.

On December 2, 2011, the Cardinals named Mabry the assistant hitting coach to Mark McGwire in 2012, soon after announcing former teammate Matheny would be the new manager. On November 5, 2012, the Cardinals promoted Mabry to hitting coach after McGwire left for the Los Angeles Dodgers. Former major league catcher Bengie Molina succeeded Mabry as the assistant hitting coach. Mabry was released from his position as hitting coach with the St. Louis Cardinals when Matheny was fired on July 14, 2018, days before the All-Star break of the 2018 season.

On December 5, 2019, Mabry was added to the Kansas City Royals' staff as a major league coach.

On December 13, 2022, Mabry was added to the Miami Marlins staff as a major league assistant hitting coach. On October 2, 2024, he was fired alongside the entirety of the Marlins coaching staff.

On May 30, 2025, the Baltimore Orioles added Mabry to their coaching staff as a senior advisor.

On November 21, 2025, the Los Angeles Angels hired Mabry to serve as an assistant hitting coach.

== Personal life ==
After his 2007 retirement as a player, Mabry continued to make his home in the St. Louis area along with his wife Ann and their four children. Long an avid outdoorsman, Mabry became a spokesman for Gander Mountain, making a series of videos on different aspects of hunting and fishing.

== See also ==
- List of St. Louis Cardinals coaches
- List of Major League Baseball players to hit for the cycle

Sporting positions
Preceded by Brant Brown	Miami Marlins hitting coach 2023–2024	Succeeded by Pedro Guerrero
Preceded by Mike Aldrete	St. Louis Cardinals assistant hitting coach 2012	Succeeded by Bengie Molina
Achievements
Preceded by Tony Fernández	Hitting for the cycle May 18, 1996	Succeeded by John Valentin
