= Alexander Autographs =

Auctioneer in Chesapeake City, Maryland

- Type: Private
- Industry: Auction
- Founded: 1993
- Founder: Bill Panagopulos
- Headquarters: Chesapeake City, Maryland, United States
- Key people: Bill Panagopulos (President)
- Products: Historic autographs, militaria, manuscripts, memorabilia, collectibles

Alexander Autographs is an auctioneer of historic militaria, autographs, manuscripts, relics, and other collectibles. Based in Chesapeake City, Maryland, the auction house first opened to bidders in 1993 and has since garnered controversy for the sale of items like Nazi memorabilia.

== Overview ==
Alexander's typically holds three to four auctions per year, and concentrates on the following categories: Militaria of all types, Colonial and Revolutionary War; the American Civil War; Americana; Presidents and Vice Presidents; Supreme Court, Cabinet Members & Politicians; Royalty and Heads of State; Military Leaders; Scientists and Inventors; Aviators, Explorers, Astronauts; Business Leaders; Authors and Writers; Artists, Illustrators and Animation Art; Composers and Musicians; Entertainers; Rock and Roll; Notables and the Notorious; and Sports.

== Notable and controversial sales ==
=== October 2005 ===
Alexander Autographs auctioned off a gold Rolex wristwatch inscribed with a message from Marilyn Monroe to President John F. Kennedy. The message reads: JACK, With love as always, from MARILYN May 29, 1962, only ten days after her famous "Happy Birthday" performance at Madison Square Garden. Included in the watch case is a poem from Monroe to Kennedy ending with a passionate plea: "Let me love or let me die!" The watch and accompanying items sold for $120,000 to an anonymous East Coast collector.

=== February 2006 ===
Alexander Autographs was forced to withdraw a letter it was auctioning, purporting to be from Ronald Reagan and written during the President's later years while he suffered with Alzheimer's. The letter's content—hand-written annotations and references to the disease, was reported upon by CBS News, U.S. News & World Report, and other media. Bill Panagopulos, company president, withdrew the item when it was discovered to have been forged and advised the press that he had been "duped" by a forger.

=== August 2008 ===
Alexander Autographs found itself embroiled in a row with eBay, the online auction house, when eBay refused to run Alexander's Nazi and other German World War II items on its website. Alexander's complied, but issued a statement on its own website adding that, "Though these items are indeed controversial, we maintain that they are of vital historic importance and cannot and must not be ignored."

=== November 2008 ===
Alexander Autographs received news coverage when the company announced plans to auction two particular items in the November 6–7 auction: the flight suit of Paul Tibbets and secret audio tapes from Jack Ruby's legal defense team. Tibbets, a colonel during World War II, flew the Hiroshima bombing mission—the auction house offered the very suit he wore on that mission and the Distinguished Service Cross Tibbets earned for his actions. Additionally, Alexander's uncovered taped conversations between Ruby's defense team, including attorney Melvin Belli, that called into question Ruby's contention that Oswald's murder was an unintentional act.

=== February 2010 ===
Alexander Autographs sold a 180-page volume of notorious German Nazi doctor Josef Mengele's diary at auction for an undisclosed sum to the grandson of a Holocaust survivor. The unidentified previous owner, who acquired the journals in Brazil, was reported to be close to the Mengele family. A Holocaust survivors' organization described the sale as "a cynical act of exploitation aimed at profiting from the writings of one of the most heinous Nazi criminals."

=== July 2011 ===
A further 31 volumes of Josef Mengele's diaries were sold—again amidst protests—by Alexander Autographs to an undisclosed collector of World War II memorabilia, described as an ultra-orthodox Jew, for $245,000. The journals cover a period from 1960 to 1975 when Mengele was living in South America.

=== July 2022 ===
In 2022, Alexander Historical Auctions, a company headed by the same president as Alexander Autographs, auctioned off Nazi memorabilia including a gold watch presented to Hitler valued at $2 million. A number of prominent Jewish leaders across Europe signed a letter urging the company to cancel the auction.
