= Chesapeake & Delaware Canal =

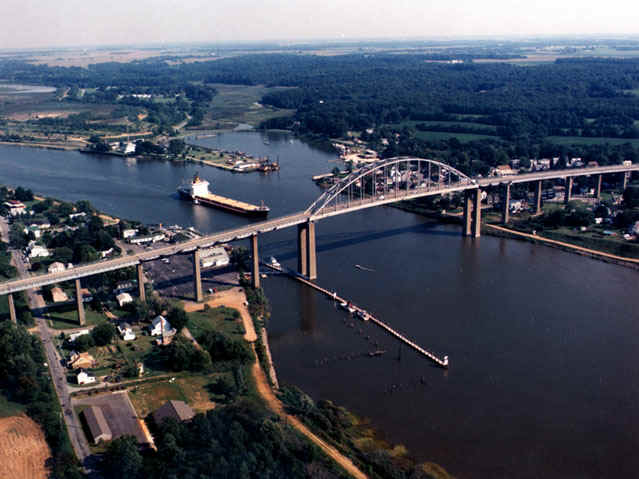
- C&D Canal at Chesapeake City, Maryland

- Path of the C&D Canal
- Interactive map of Chesapeake & Delaware Canal
- Location: Maryland and Delaware, U.S.
- Country: United States

Specifications
- Length: 14 miles (23 km)
- Locks: None
- Status: Open
- Navigation authority: U.S. Army Corps of Engineers

History
- Date completed: 1829

Geography
- Start point: Chesapeake Bay
- End point: Delaware River
- Beginning coordinates: 39.5238°N 75.8734°W
- Ending coordinates: 39.5612°N 75.5582°W

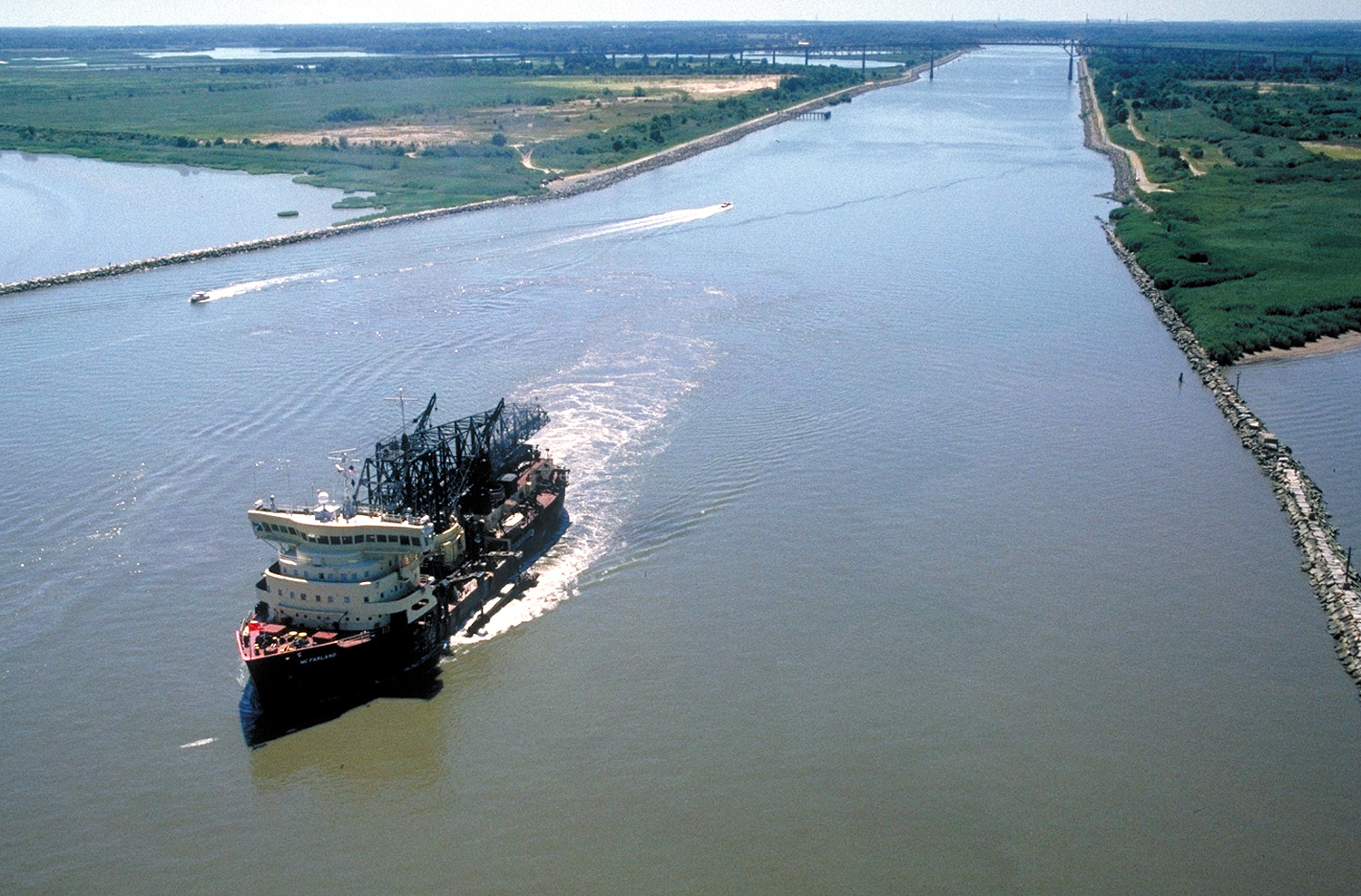
A U.S. Army Corps of Engineers dredge leaves the eastern entrance to the canal on the Delaware River at Reedy Point, Delaware.

The Chesapeake & Delaware Canal (C&D Canal) is a 14-mile (22.5 km)-long, 450-foot (137.2 m)-wide and 35-foot (10.7 m)-deep ship canal that connects the Delaware River with the Chesapeake Bay in the states of Delaware and Maryland in the United States.

In the mid-17th century, mapmaker Augustine Herman observed that these great bodies of water were separated only by a narrow strip of land. In 1764, a survey of possible water routes across the Delmarva Peninsula was made, but little action followed. The idea was raised again in 1788 by regional business leaders, including famed Philadelphians Benjamin Franklin and Benjamin Rush.

Despite the beginnings of a commercial venture in 1802 coincident with Canal Mania in England and Wales, it was not until 1829 until the C&D Canal Company could, at last, announce the waterway "open for business". Its construction cost of $3.5 million (equivalent to $89.1 million in 2025) made it one of the most expensive canal projects of its time.

In the present era, the C&D Canal is owned and operated by the U.S. Army Corps of Engineers, Philadelphia District. The project office in Chesapeake City, Maryland, is also the site of the C&D Canal Museum and Bethel Bridge Lighthouse. The canal saves approximately 300 miles on the route between Wilmington or Philadelphia on the Delaware River and Baltimore on Chesapeake Bay, avoiding a course around the Delmarva Peninsula.

The canal is a landmark and cultural boundary for the state of Delaware, considered a divide between the urbanized northern portion of the state and the rural southern portion, known locally as "Lower Delaware", and demarcates an unofficial northern limit to the Delmarva Peninsula.

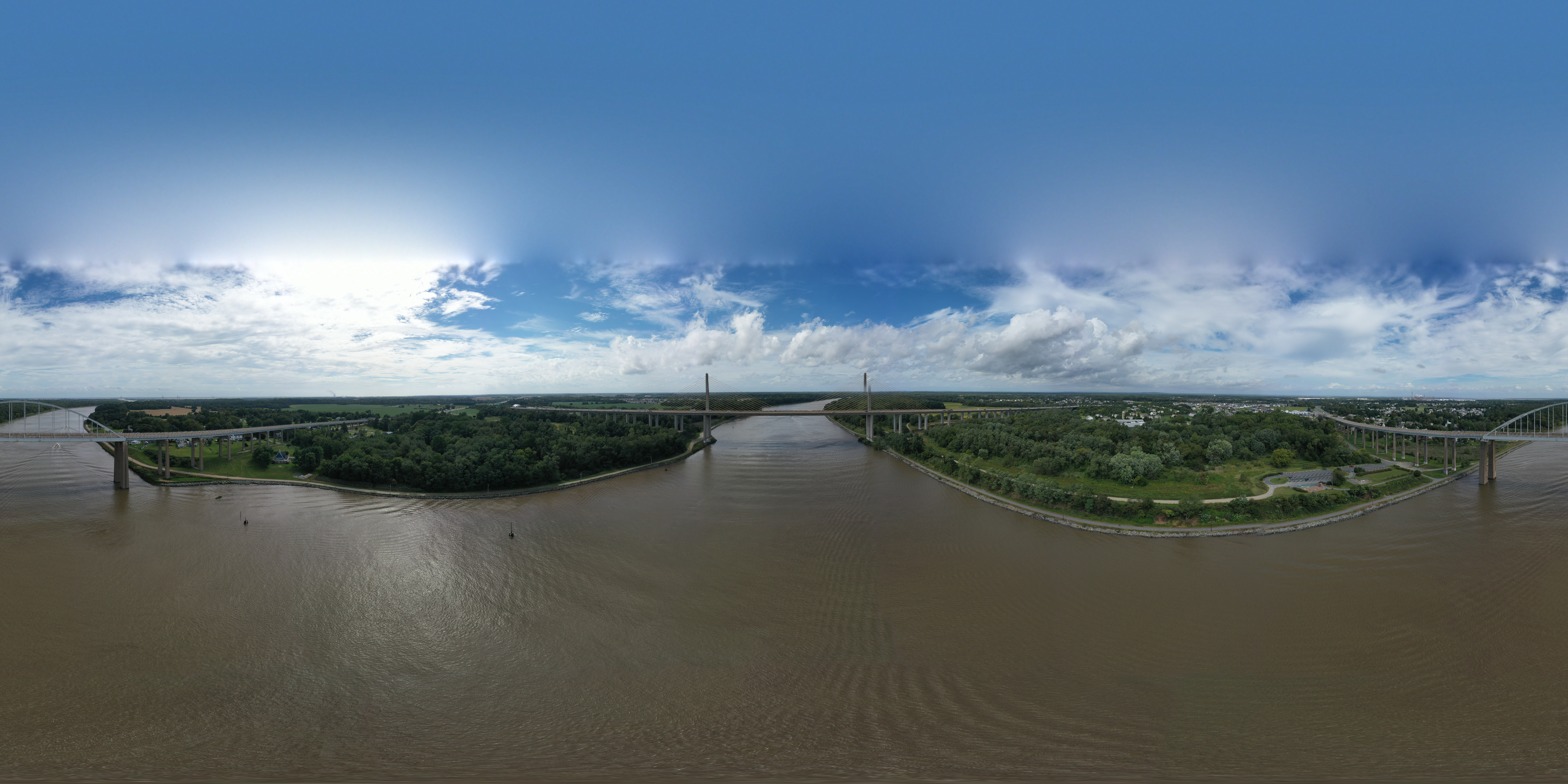
A 360 photosphere shot from above and between the St. Georges and the William V. Roth Jr. Bridges. (view as a 360° interactive panorama)

== Early years ==
In the mid‑17th century, Augustine Herman, a mapmaker and Prague native who had served as an envoy for the Dutch, observed that two great bodies of water, the Delaware River and Chesapeake Bay, were separated only by a narrow strip of land. Herman proposed that a waterway be built to connect the two.

More than a century passed before any action was taken. In 1764, a survey of possible water routes across the Delmarva Peninsula was made. One was proposed by Thomas Gilpin, Sr., a Quaker from Philadelphia, Pennsylvania, who, along with other members of the American Philosophical Society, sought a waterway to shorten the shipping distance from the Chesapeake Bay to Philadelphia. He proposed a canal across the Delmarva Peninsula to connect the Chester River at present-day Millington, Maryland, to the Delaware River. He even bought 39 acres (16 ha) of land, largely in and around Millington, but the canal would not become a reality for decades.

The idea was raised again in 1788 by regional business leaders, including noted Philadelphians Benjamin Franklin and Benjamin Rush. The canal would reduce, by nearly 300 miles (500 km), the water routes between Philadelphia and Baltimore.

In 1802, following actions by the legislatures of Maryland, Delaware, and Pennsylvania, the Chesapeake & Delaware Canal Company was incorporated, with merchant and banker Joseph Tatnall as president. More surveys followed, and in 1804, construction of the canal began under Benjamin Latrobe. The work included 14 locks to connect the Christina River in Delaware with the Elk River at Welch Point, Maryland, but the project was halted two years later for lack of funds.

== Construction ==
The canal company was reorganized in 1822, and new surveys determined that more than $2 million in capital was needed to resume construction. Eventually, the Commonwealth of Pennsylvania purchased $100,000 in stock, the State of Maryland, $50,000; and Delaware, $25,000. The federal government invested $450,000, with the remainder subscribed by the public.

The U.S. Army Corps of Engineers played a vital yet unofficial role for the canal company in 1823 and 1824, providing two senior officers to help determine a canal route. The engineer officers and two civilian engineers recommended a new route with four locks, extending from Newbold's Landing Harbor (now Delaware City), westward to the Back Creek branch of the Elk River in Maryland.

Canal construction resumed in April 1824, and within several years some 2,600 men were digging and hauling dirt from the ditch. Laborers toiled with pick and shovel at the immense construction task, working for an average daily wage of 75 cents. The swampy marshlands along the canal's planned route proved a great impediment to progress; workers continuously battled slides along the "ditch's" soft slopes. It was 1829 before the C&D Canal Company could, at last, announce the waterway "open for business". Its construction cost of $3.5 million made it one of the most expensive canal projects of its time.

In 1825, due to the efforts of Benjamin Wright, the company fired the canal's chief engineer, John Randel Jr., who had surveyed its route and built the difficult eastern section. Randel sued the company for breach of contract, and in 1834 a jury returned an award to Randel of $226,885.84 (equivalent to $7,317,068 in 2025), a tremendous amount for the time. The canal company's appeals went as high as the United States Supreme Court, which affirmed the award. The company attempted to avoid paying the judgment, but the state legislatures of both Maryland and Delaware passed bills requiring the canal company to pay off its debts within five years. The huge award almost bankrupted the company.

== 1829 to 1919 ==
- Eastern Lock of the Chesapeake & Delaware Canal
- U.S. National Register of Historic Places
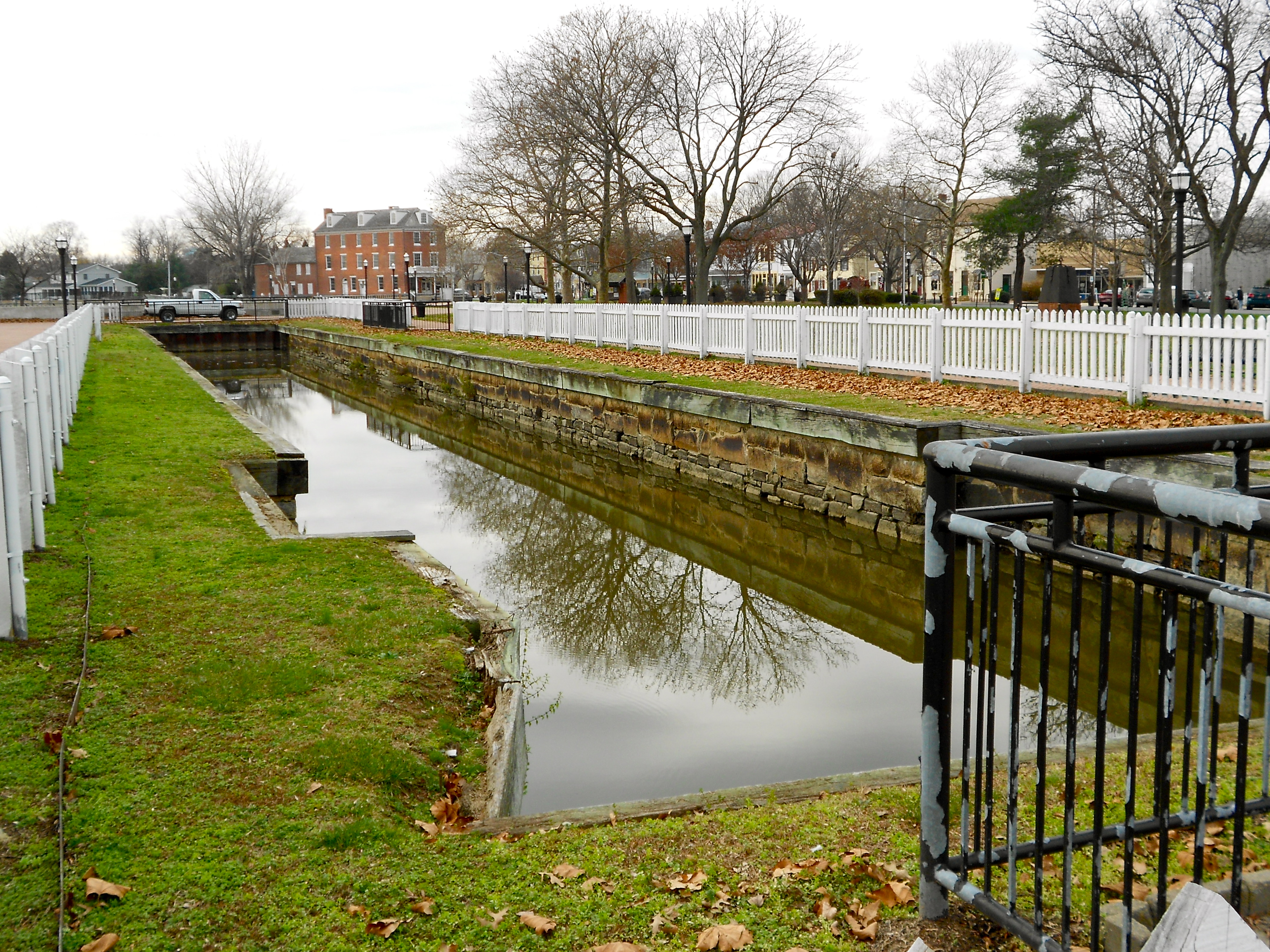
- Eastern Lock of the Chesapeake & Delaware Canal, Battery Park, December 2011
- Location: Battery Park, Delaware City, Delaware
- Coordinates: 39°34′44″N 75°35′14″W
- Built: 1829
- NRHP reference No.: 75000543
- Added to NRHP: April 21, 1975

The Chesapeake Bay and Delaware River were now connected by a navigation channel measuring nearly 14 miles (23 km) long, 10 feet (3 m) deep, 66 feet (20 m) wide at the waterline and 36 feet (11 m) wide along the channel bottom. A covered wooden bridge at Summit, Delaware, spanned the canal across the "Deep Cut", measuring 250 feet (76 m) between abutments. The bridge floor was 90 feet (27 m) above the channel bottom. Three wooden swing bridges also crossed the canal. Locks to pass vessels through the waterway's various levels were constructed at Delaware City, Delaware and St. Georges, Delaware, and two at Chesapeake City. Each measured 100 feet (30 m) long and 22 feet (6.7 m) wide and was eventually enlarged to 220 feet (67 m) in length and 24 feet (7.3 m) in width.

Teams of mules and horses towed freight and passenger barges, schooners and sloops through the canal. Cargoes included practically every useful item of daily life: lumber, grain, farm products, fish, cotton, coal, iron, and whiskey. Packet ships were eventually established to move freight through the waterway. The Ericsson Line operated between Baltimore and Philadelphia, and continued to carry passengers and freight through the canal into the 1940s. The cargo tonnage peaked in 1872 with more than 1.3 million tons transiting the canal.

Along the route across the top of the Delmarva Peninsula, at least six lighthouses warned barges and other vessels passing through the canal when they were approaching bridges and locks. These small wooden lighthouses had had red lanterns mounted atop them.

The Ericsson Line of steamboats originated as steamers built for freight only; however, the line converted to passenger boats during 1876 at the time of the Centennial Exposition in Philadelphia as the demand for travel increased. The Baltimore and Philadelphia Steamship Companies, which operated the Ericsson line, built and furnished ships with seventy to eighty staterooms in addition to the freight facilities. In turn, these ships grew from less than one hundred to more than six hundred tons and greatly increased travel from Baltimore to Philadelphia. The Ericsson Line was named after its first ship, Ericsson, which was named after John Ericsson who developed the screw propeller that was installed on the vessel specifically designed for the Chesapeake & Delaware Canal. Ericsson was built at Reanie & Neafie's shipyard in Philadelphia by Anthony Groves, Jr. The ship, finished in 1843, was 78 feet (24 m) in length and weighed eighty tons. It began operations in 1844 under the direction of Captain Noah F. Ireland. The Ericsson Line operated out of Baltimore's No. 1 Light Street Pier for 75 years, serving passenger and freight demands throughout the waterway with thirty registered steamers. The Ericsson Line's success brought utility and prosperity to the canal and promoted an expansion of trade by means of its growth and connection to the Atlantic Deeper Waterways Association of the Chesapeake & Delaware Canal.

Loss of water in the locks was a problem from early on. As boats passed through at Chesapeake City, the equivalent of a full lock of water was lost to the lower-lying portion of the canal. This loss, compounded by leakage through the canal banks and normal evaporation, made it necessary to devise a means of lifting water into the project's upper part.

A steam operated pump was purchased in 1837 to raise water from Back Creek, and in 1852 a steam engine and large waterwheel were installed at the pumphouse in Chesapeake City. Measuring 39 feet (12 m) in diameter and 10 feet (3 m) wide, the iron and wood waterwheel had 12 troughs which filled with water as it turned; the water then spilled over the hub into the raceway and into the uppermost canal level. By 1854 a second steam engine was in use. The two 150 horsepower (110 kW) engines consumed eight tons of coal daily while lifting 170 tons of water per minute into the canal. The waterwheel and steam engines remained in continuous use through the mid‑1920s.

Throughout the 19th century, the canal's use continued to change with the New Castle and Frenchtown Turnpike and Rail Road being its only major competitor. Steam power brought larger and deeper-draft vessels that could not pass through the restricting locks. By the turn of the 20th century the decline in canal traffic and cost of operation and repairs reduced canal profits. Clearly a larger, wider, and deeper waterway was needed.

At the time, however, little thought was given to improving the existing canal. New companies were formed instead, considering at least six new canal routes, but committees and commissions appointed to study the issue failed to agree on a plan. In 1906 President Theodore Roosevelt appointed a new commission to report on the feasibility of converting the canal to a "free and open waterway."

== 1920s to 1970s ==
In 1919 the federal government bought the canal for $2.5 million and designated it the "Intra-coastal Waterway Delaware River to Chesapeake Bay, Delaware and Maryland." The purchase included six bridges and a railroad span owned by the Pennsylvania Railroad. These were replaced during the 1920s by four vertical lift spans and a new railroad bridge.

Responsibility for operating, maintaining, and improving the waterway was assigned to the U.S. Army Corps of Engineers, Wilmington District. In the mid-1920s, work began to move the eastern entrance at Delaware City several miles south to Reedy Point, Delaware. All locks (except the one at Delaware City) were removed, and the waterway was converted to a sea-level operation at 12 feet (3.7 m) deep and 90 feet (27.4 m) wide. These improvements cost $10 million. Two stone jetties at the new eastern entrance were completed in 1926. The sole remaining lock at Delaware City — a stone structure, resting on wooden underpinnings, with a wooden floor — would eventually be preserved and, in 1975, listed on the National Register of Historic Places.

The "new" canal opened in May 1927 with great celebration, even as plans were underway for further expansion to accommodate ever larger ships. The Philadelphia District assumed operation of the canal in 1933. Between 1935 and 1938, the channel was again improved, deepened to 27 feet (8.2 m) and widened to 250 feet (76.2 m) at a cost of nearly $13 million. The project was also expanded to include a federal navigation channel 27 feet (8.2 m) deep and 400 feet (121.9 m) wide for some 26 miles (41.8 km) in the Upper Chesapeake Bay, from the Elk River to Pooles Island.

Through the years, as the sizes and tonnages of ships using the canal continued to grow, accidents and one‑way traffic restrictions strained the canal's capacity. Between 1938 and 1950 alone, eight ships collided with bridges. In 1954, the United States Congress authorized further expansion of the channel to 450 feet (137.2 m) wide and 35 feet (10.7 m) deep. These improvements, begun in the 1960s, were completed in the mid‑1970s.

New bridges to accommodate highway traffic crossing the canal also became necessary as deepening and widening progressed. Two mechanical lift bridges at St. Georges and Chesapeake City were toppled by ship collisions and replaced in the 1940s with high-level highway spans (the former, the St. Georges Bridge, has largely been bypassed by the new Senator William V. Roth Jr. Bridge, opened in 1995). Two other high-level vehicular traffic bridges, Summit Bridge in 1960 and Reedy Point Bridge in 1968, were constructed as part of the 1954 improvement authorization.

In 1966, a new railroad lift bridge (the Chesapeake & Delaware Canal Lift Bridge) was also completed by the Corps and turned over to the Pennsylvania Railroad to carry freight across the canal. The railroad and Summit spans were recognized by the American Institute of Steel Construction as the most beautiful bridges of their types in the years they were completed.

After the modern sea-level canal opened in 1927, pilot boats operated by the Army Corps of Engineers worked at each end of the waterway, one assigned to Reedy Point on the Delaware River and the other stationed at Town Point on the Elk River in Maryland. These patrol boats met incoming ships, checked traffic, did patrols, and sometimes made rescues. But modernization had arrived on Canal as closed circuit televisions, radar, and advanced in radio communications made the work of meeting incoming boats and other tasks obsolete. On Nov. 19, 1968, the work of the patrol boats was retired, and modern, centralized technology took over the tasks.

== Post-1970s ==
Today's canal is a modern sea-level, electronically controlled commercial waterway, serving as the northern maritime gateway to the Port of Baltimore.

Since 1933 the Corps' Philadelphia District has managed canal and highway bridge operations from a two-story white frame building on the canal's southern bank at Chesapeake City, Maryland. Cargo ships, tankers, container-carrying vessels (all up to Seawaymax-classification), barges accompanied by tugboats, and countless recreational boats create a steady flow of traffic. Through state-of-the-art fiber optic and microwave links, dispatchers use closed-circuit television and radio systems to monitor and safely move commercial traffic through the waterway.

Navigating oceangoing vessels requires extensive maritime skills, with strong currents or bad weather conditions adding to the risks. A United States Coast Guard certified pilot is required for vessels engaged in foreign trade transiting the canal, the Delaware River and Bay, and Chesapeake Bay. Many shipping firms use pilots from the Delaware River and Bay or Maryland pilots' associations.

Typically a Delaware River and Bay pilot boards a ship as it passes Lewes, Delaware, entering the Delaware Bay, and guides the vessel up the bay and into the canal to Chesapeake City. A Maryland pilot then takes over and continues the ship's transit into the Chesapeake Bay to Baltimore or Annapolis, Maryland. The procedure is reversed for eastbound ships. At Chesapeake City a "changing of the pilots" takes place, while the pilot launch maneuvers alongside a vessel as it continues its journey without stopping. The pilots use the ship's gangway, pilot ladder, or port entrance to climb aboard or leave the vessel.

== C&D Canal Museum ==
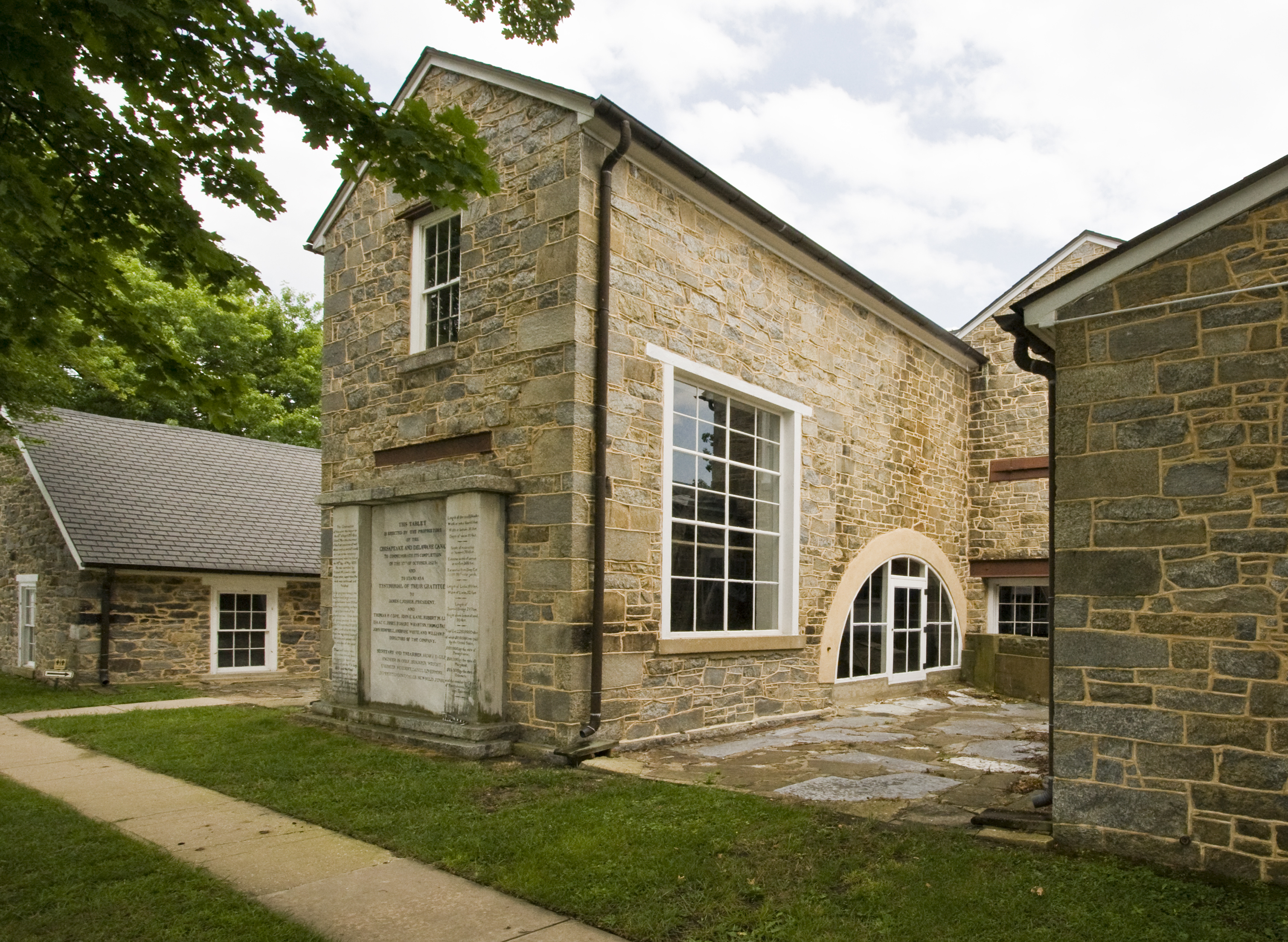
C&D Canal Museum

The U.S. Army Corps of Engineers operates the C&D Canal Museum at Chesapeake City, Maryland, housed in the original canal pumphouse with a waterwheel and pumping engines. The museum illustrates the canal's history and operations. Current operations can be viewed through a television monitor affording visitors up-to-the minute locations on ships traveling through the canal. Admission is free, and the museum is open Monday-Friday year round except for government holidays.

A full-sized replica of the 30-foot (9.1 m) Bethel Bridge Lighthouse is located on Corps property, a short walk from the museum. The original lighthouse was used to warn vessels of locks and bridges in the days before the 1927 canal changes made it sea level.

== Crossings ==
The following are crossings of the Chesapeake & Delaware Canal north to south and vice versa:

Crossing	Carries	Location	Coordinates
Chesapeake City Bridge	MD 213	Chesapeake City, Maryland	39°31′45″N 75°48′50″W
Summit Bridge	DE 71 / DE 896	Summit, Delaware	39°32′29″N 75°44′17″W
Chesapeake & Delaware Canal Lift Bridge	Delmarva Central Railroad	Kirkwood, Delaware	39°32′36″N 75°42′11″W
Senator William V. Roth Jr. Bridge (Chesapeake & Delaware Canal Bridge)	DE 1	St. Georges, Delaware	39°33′00″N 75°39′23″W
St. Georges Bridge	US 13	St. Georges, Delaware	39°33′10″N 75°39′05″W
Reedy Point Bridge	DE 9	Delaware City, Delaware	39°33′30″N 75°34′57″W

== See also ==
- John Randel Jr.
- Benjamin Wright
- List of canals in the United States
- Delaware Canal – A sister canal from the mouth of the Lehigh River and canal terminus, feeding urban Philadelphia connecting with the Morris and Lehigh canals at their respective Easton terminals.
- Delaware and Raritan Canal – A New Jersey canal connection to the New York & New Jersey markets shipping primarily coal across the Delaware River. The D&R also shipped Iron Ore from New Jersey up the Lehigh.
- Delaware and Schuylkill navigation company- 1791 private stock company that failed and was a predecessor to the 1815 Schuylkill Navigation company.
- Delaware and Hudson Canal – Another early built coal canal as the American canal age began; contemporary with the Lehigh and the Schuylkill navigations.
- Lehigh Canal – the coal canal in the Lehigh Valley that fed the United States' early Industrial revolution energy needs directly and via the Delaware Canal businesses all along the forty miles to Philadelphia from Easton, Pennsylvania. (Note: If the Lehigh Canal hadn't been built, the Delaware Canal would have had nothing worth the expense to ship, so the investment would never have happened. The principal customer of the Delaware was the coal barges coming down the Lehigh shipped by Lehigh Coal & Navigation Company, which also came to manage the Delaware Canal into the 1960s.)
- Morris Canal – Another important American Industrial Revolution canal feeding steel mills ores from Central New Jersey and coal to New York and New Jersey Markets.
- Pennsylvania Canal System – an ambitious collection of far-flung canals, and eventually railroads authorized early in 1826.
- Schuylkill Canal – Navigation joining Reading, PA and Philadelphia. (Note: The Schuylkill Canal was long delayed by investors quarreling over the best way to proceed. Disgusted, White and Erskine Hazard explored tapping Anthracite supplies via the Lehigh, and ended up incorporating the Lehigh Coal & Navigation Company which spearheaded many technological initiatives.)
- Schuylkill and Susquehanna Navigation Company - 1791 predecessor private stock company that failed.
- Union canal - 1811 private stock company that completed the "golden link between the Schuylkill and Susquehanna rivers in 1828, thereby connecting the Schuylkill Navigation company with the Pennsylvania canal in Middleton.
- Guthrie Branch (C and D Canal tributary)
