= Chesapeake City, Maryland =

- Town
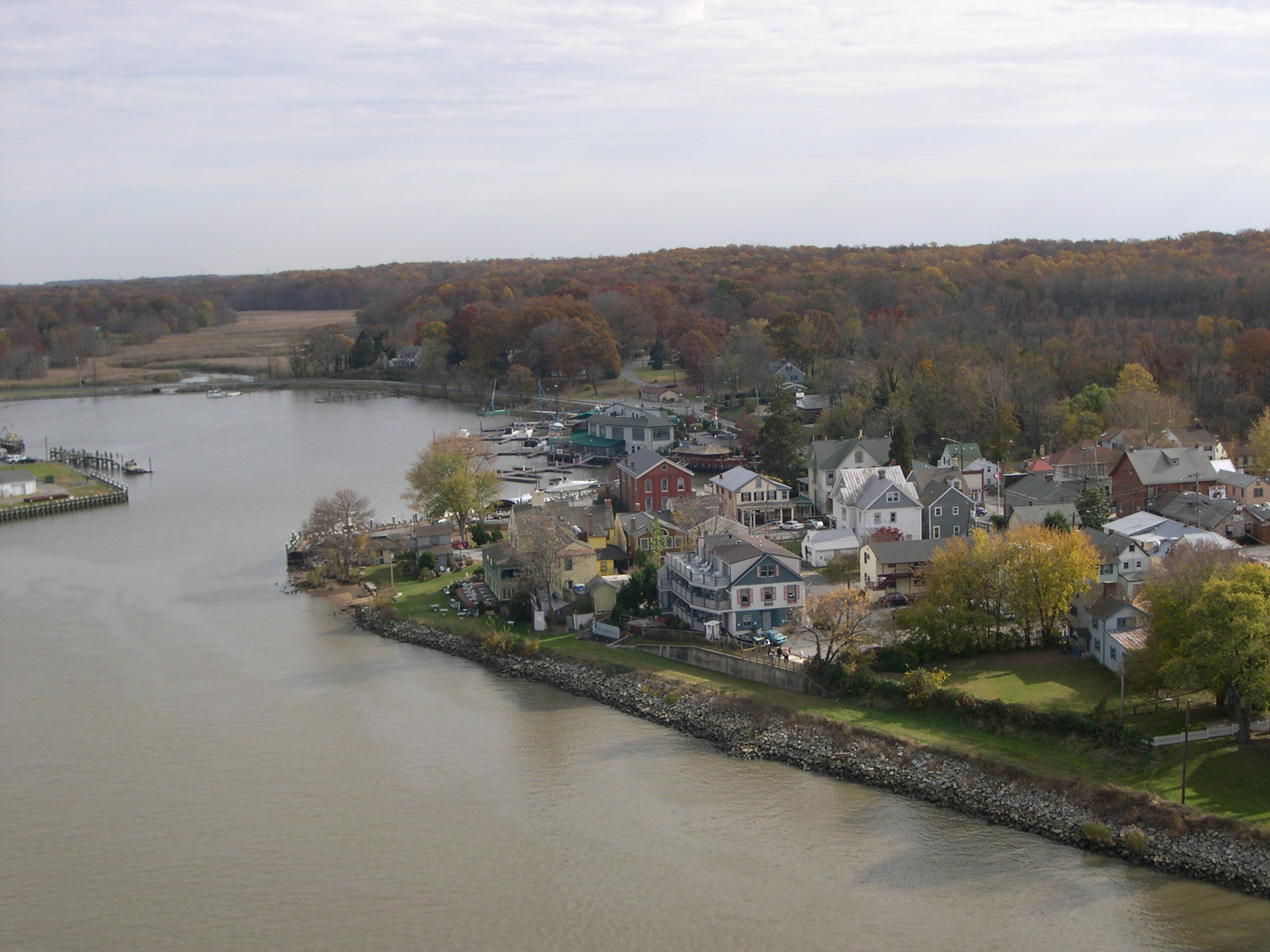
- Chesapeake City along the Chesapeake and Delaware Canal

- Flag Seal

- Location of Chesapeake City, Maryland
- Coordinates: 39°31′40″N 75°48′44″W
- Country: United States
- State: Maryland
- County: Cecil
- Incorporated: 1850

Government
  - Mayor: Rich Taylor

Area
  - Total: 0.73 sq mi (1.88 km^{2})
  - Land: 0.53 sq mi (1.37 km^{2})
  - Water: 0.19 sq mi (0.50 km^{2})
- Elevation: 26 ft (8 m)

Population (2020)
  - Total: 736
  - Density: 1,387.8/sq mi (535.84/km^{2})
- Time zone: UTC-5 (Eastern (EST))
  - Summer (DST): UTC-4 (EDT)
- ZIP code: 21915
- Area code: 410
- FIPS code: 24-15950
- GNIS feature ID: 0589952
- Website: www.chesapeakecity-md.gov

Chesapeake City is a town in Cecil County, Maryland, United States. The population was 736 at the 2020 census.

The town was originally named by Bohemian colonist Augustine Herman the Village of Bohemia — or Bohemia Manor — but the name was changed in 1839 after the Chesapeake and Delaware Canal (C&D Canal) was built in 1829. Today, the town contains numerous old homes from that era that have been converted into bed and breakfasts, restaurants and the local historical museum.

== History ==
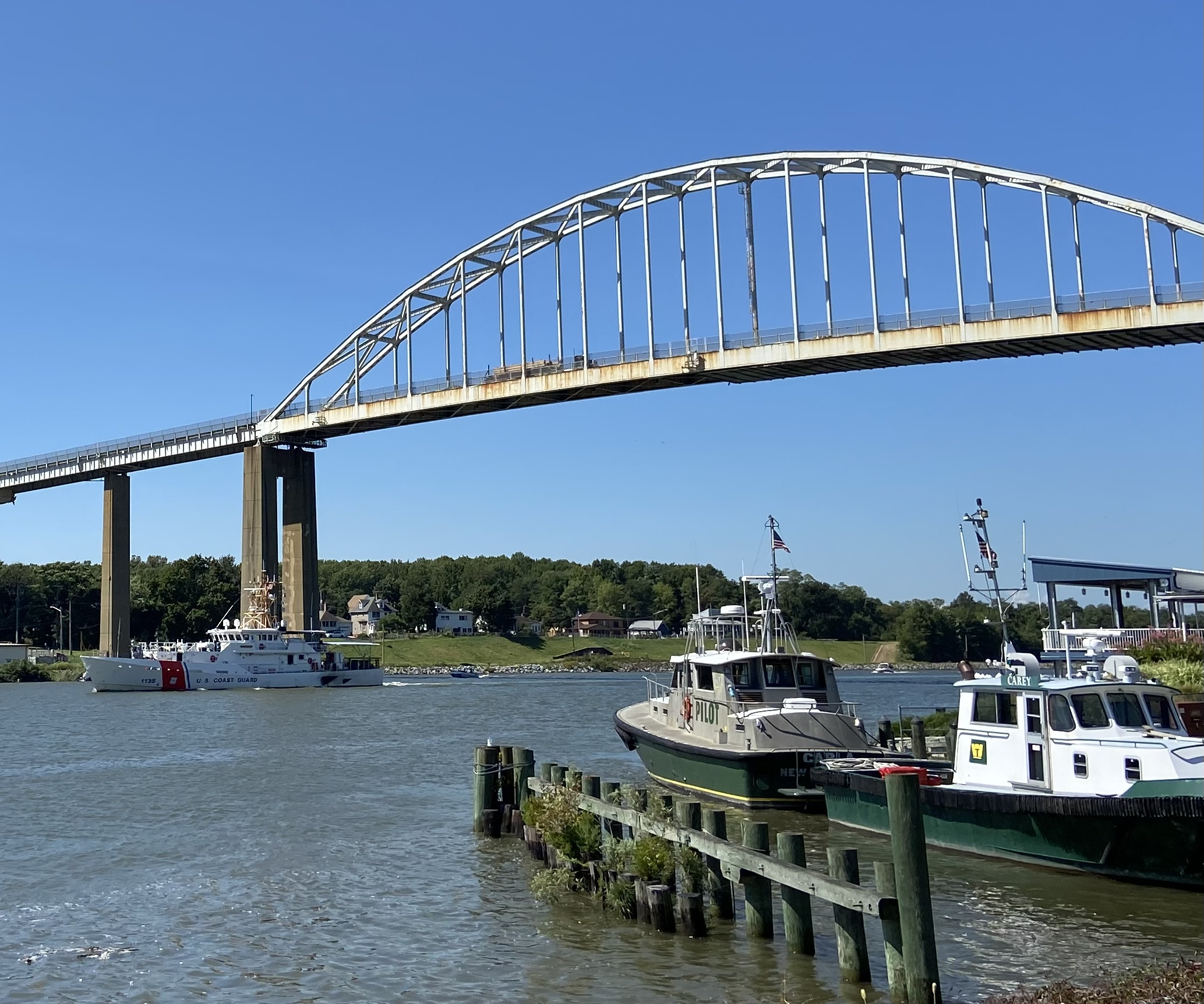
The Chesapeake City Bridge

The town was separated into north and south sections when the C&D Canal was built through the middle of the town. The two were connected by a drawbridge until 1942 when that was destroyed by a freighter that struck it. The current bridge opened in 1949.

The new bridge had to be tall enough to allow supertankers to pass beneath it, resulting in a structure so high and long that cars no longer went into the city to cross the canal. Business declined for decades thereafter.

Around 1911, members of the Ukrainian community bought farmland at the edge of Chesapeake City and established homes here. They worked on the canal when it expanded in the 1920s and farmed as they brought their traditions and culture to the top of the Eastern Shore of Maryland. In 1911, the Ukrainian Catholic Church announced plans for a church and an orphanage. St. Basil's Ukrainian Church opened a few years later and prior to World War I the St. Basil Orphanage on a hilltop alongside the C & D Canal was caring for children. The orphanage maintained by the Sisters of the Order of St. Basil the Great (O.S.B.M) operated until the 1970s. The church continues to serve the spiritual needs of the community with regular services.^{,}

Chesapeake City is the location of the Old Lock Pump House of the C&D Canal, listed on the National Register of Historic Places in 1966. The South Chesapeake City Historic District was listed in 1974.

In the late 20th century, Chesapeake City was the home of one of the world's most important thoroughbred stud farms, Windfields Farm.

== Geography ==
Chesapeake City is located at 39°31′40″N 75°48′44″W (39.527826, -75.812270).

According to the United States Census Bureau, the town has a total area of 0.69 square miles (1.79 km^{2}), of which 0.50 square miles (1.29 km^{2}) is land and 0.19 square miles (0.49 km^{2}) is water.

== Demographics ==
Historical population
Census	Pop.	Note	%±
1850	423		—
1870	1,008		—
1880	1,402		39.1%
1890	1,155		−17.6%
1900	1,172		1.5%
1910	1,016		−13.3%
1920	958		−5.7%
1930	1,016		6.1%
1940	1,094		7.7%
1950	1,154		5.5%
1960	1,104		−4.3%
1970	1,031		−6.6%
1980	899		−12.8%
1990	735		−18.2%
2000	787		7.1%
2010	673		−14.5%
2020	736		9.4%
U.S. Decennial Census

=== 2010 census ===
As of the census of 2010, there were 673 people, 335 households, and 177 families living in the town. The population density was 1,346.0 inhabitants per square mile (519.7/km^{2}). There were 390 housing units at an average density of 780.0 per square mile (301.2/km^{2}). The racial makeup of the town was 96.6% White, 2.4% African American, 0.1% Native American, 0.4% Asian, 0.1% from other races, and 0.3% from two or more races. Hispanic or Latino of any race were 2.8% of the population.

There were 335 households, of which 20.6% had children under the age of 18 living with them, 40.0% were married couples living together, 9.6% had a female householder with no husband present, 3.3% had a male householder with no wife present, and 47.2% were non-families. 39.7% of all households were made up of individuals, and 15.5% had someone living alone who was 65 years of age or older. The average household size was 2.01 and the average family size was 2.67.

The median age in the town was 47.9 years. 15% of residents were under the age of 18; 7.5% were between the ages of 18 and 24; 22% were from 25 to 44; 35.5% were from 45 to 64, and 20.1% were 65 years of age or older. The gender makeup of the town was 44.9% male and 55.1% female.

=== 2000 census ===
As of the census of 2000, there were 787 people, 330 households, and 228 families living in the town. The population density was 1,393.1 inhabitants per square mile (537.9/km^{2}). There were 371 housing units at an average density of 656.7 per square mile (253.6/km^{2}). The racial makeup of the town was 94.92% White, 3.56% African American, 0.25% Native American, 0.38% Asian, 0.51% from other races, and 0.38% from two or more races. Hispanic or Latino of any race were 0.76% of the population.

There were 330 households, out of which 27.9% had children under the age of 18 living with them, 51.8% were married couples living together, 12.4% had a female householder with no husband present, and 30.9% were non-families. 24.2% of all households were made up of individuals, and 11.8% had someone living alone who was 65 years of age or older. The average household size was 2.38 and the average family size was 2.79.

In the town, the population was spread out, with 21.7% under the age of 18, 6.1% from 18 to 24, 27.8% from 25 to 44, 27.7% from 45 to 64, and 16.6% who were 65 years of age or older. The median age was 40 years. For every 100 females, there were 84.3 males. For every 100 females age 18 and over, there were 88.4 males.

The median income for a household in the town was $46,917, and the median income for a family was $52,813. Males had a median income of $35,250 versus $26,471 for females. The per capita income for the town was $21,621. About 5.2% of families and 6.2% of the population were below the poverty line, including 12.7% of those under age 18 and 2.3% of those age 65 or over.

== Education ==
Chesapeake City is a part of the Cecil County Public Schools System. There are three schools in the town:

- Chesapeake City Elementary School
  - The previous facility, about 42,000 square feet (3,900 m^{2}) in size, is in the southern part of Chesapeake City, along the Chesapeake & Delaware Canal. In 2019 a groundbreaking for the new school facility, along Augustine Herman Highway at the midpoint between the Bohemia Manor secondary schools and the Cheseapeake City fire department facility, was imminent. The facility, with about 62,000 square feet (5,800 m^{2}) in area, is designed to look like the area bridge. The building's model is Gilpin Manor Elementary School.
- Bohemia Manor Middle School
- Bohemia Manor High School

Chesapeake City is served by the Chesapeake City Branch of the Cecil County Public Library located on Maryland Route 213. The library offers books, music, movies, computers with Internet access, free wifi, and programs for adults, teens, and children.

== Transportation ==
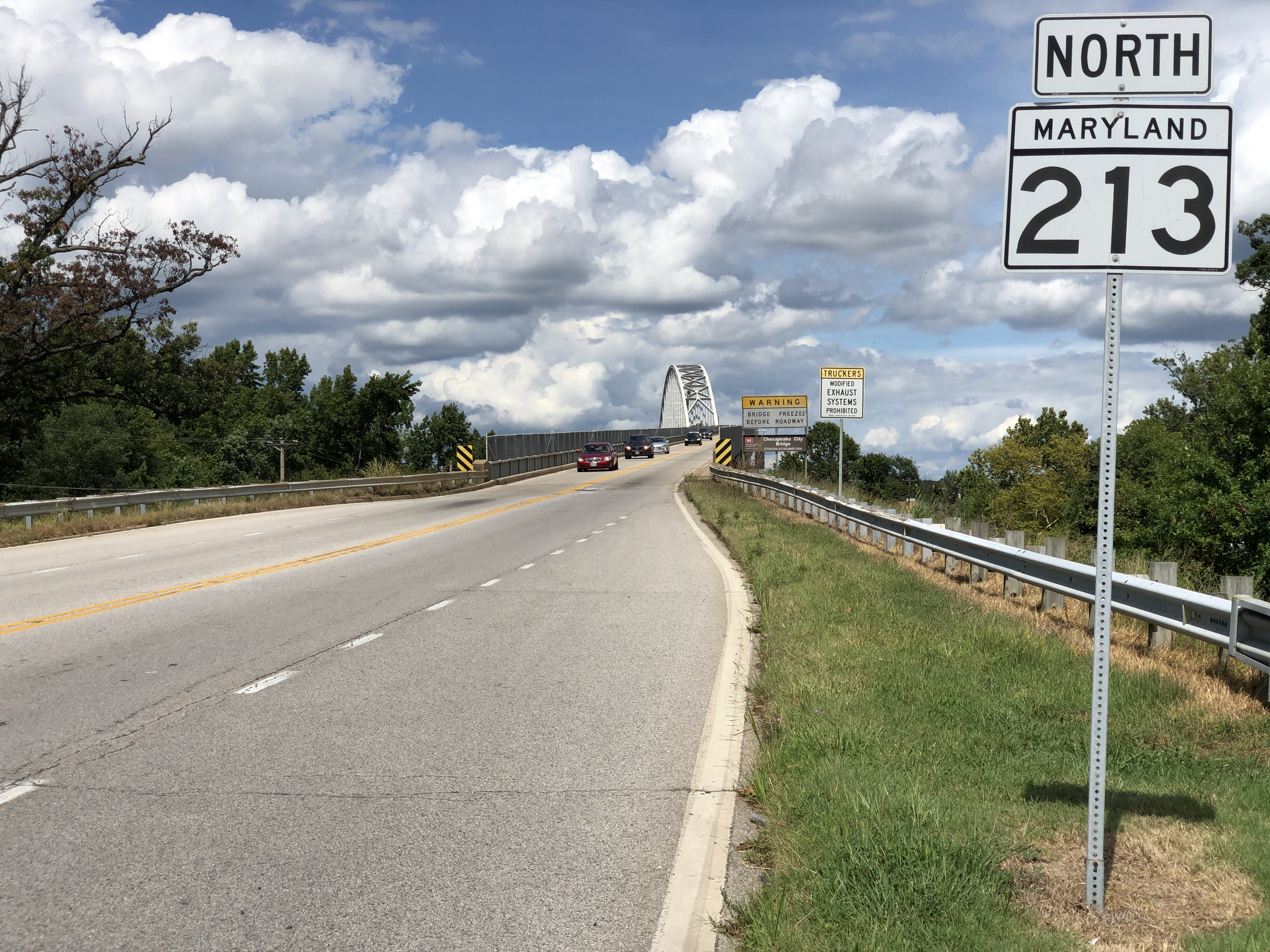
MD 213 northbound just before the Chesapeake City Bridge

The main method of transportation to and from the town is by road. Maryland Route 213 is the main highway serving Chesapeake City, connecting the two halves of the town via the Chesapeake City Bridge. MD 213 extends northward towards Elkton and southwards to Cecilton. Other state highways serving the town include Maryland Route 284, Maryland Route 285, Maryland Route 286, Maryland Route 342 and Maryland Route 537.

== Notable people ==
- John Mabry, former major league baseball player and current hitting coach for the Kansas City Royals

== See also ==
- Alexander Autographs

== Gallery ==
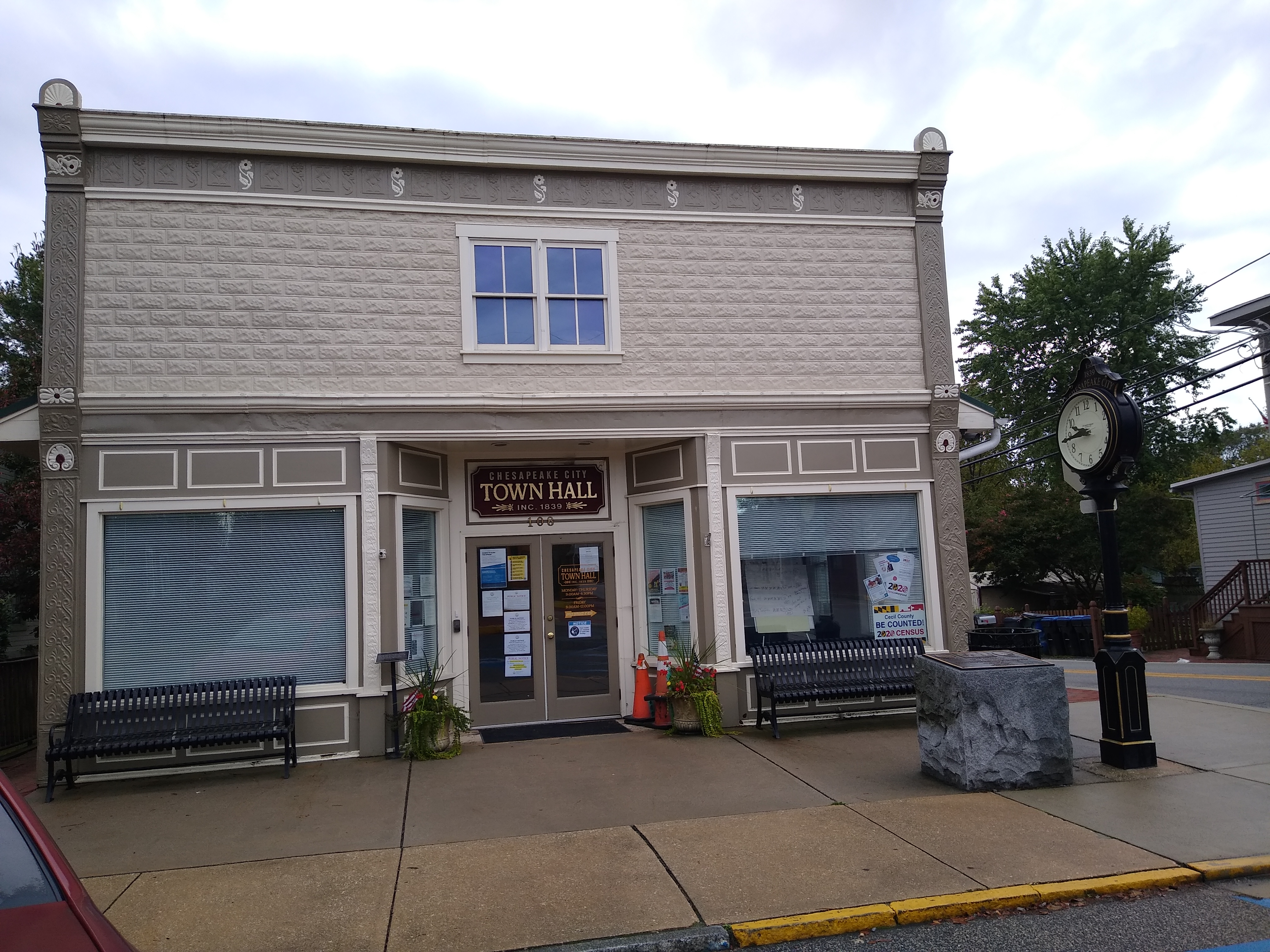
Town Hall

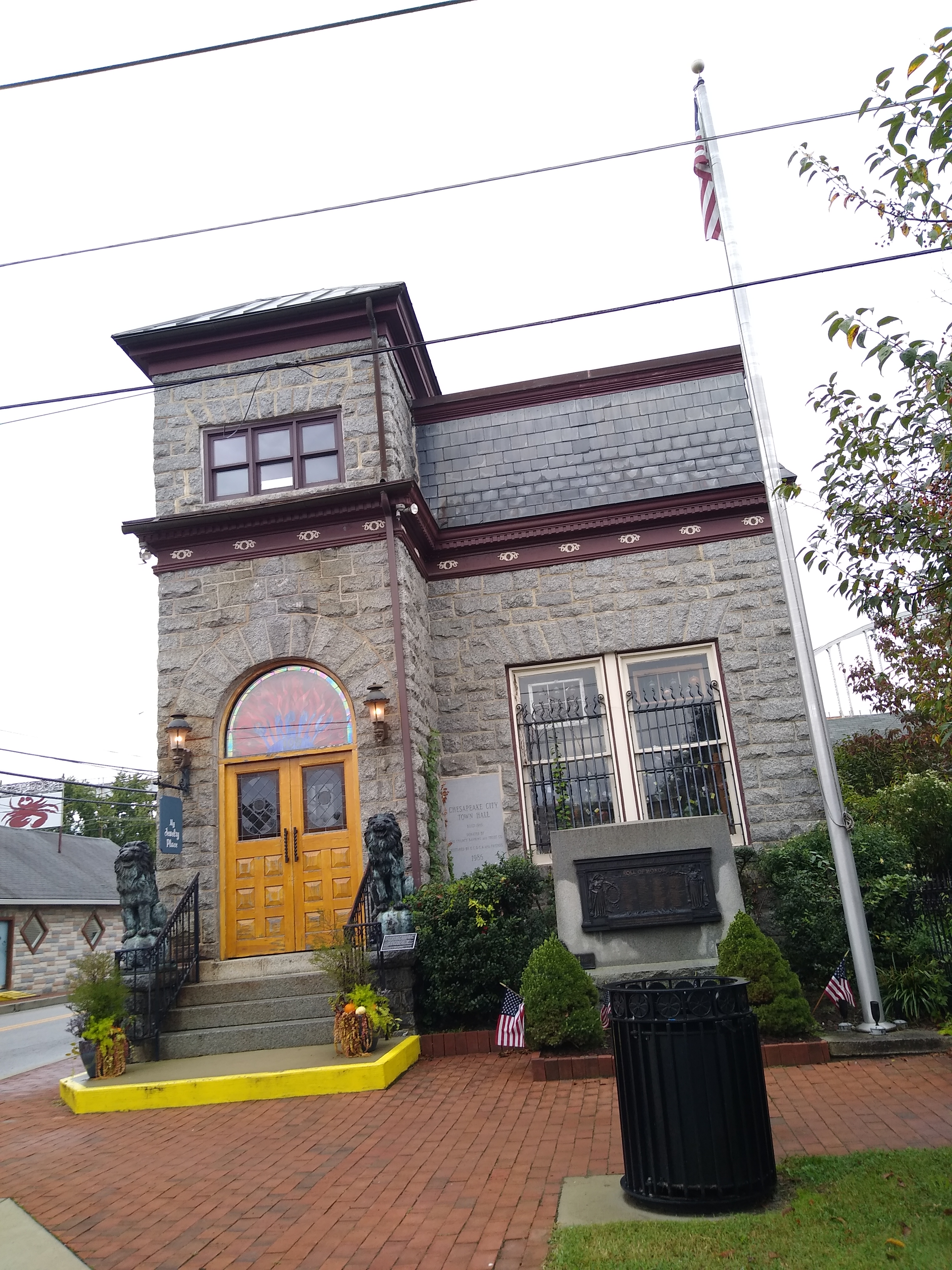
Former town hall
