= List of the oldest churches in the United States =

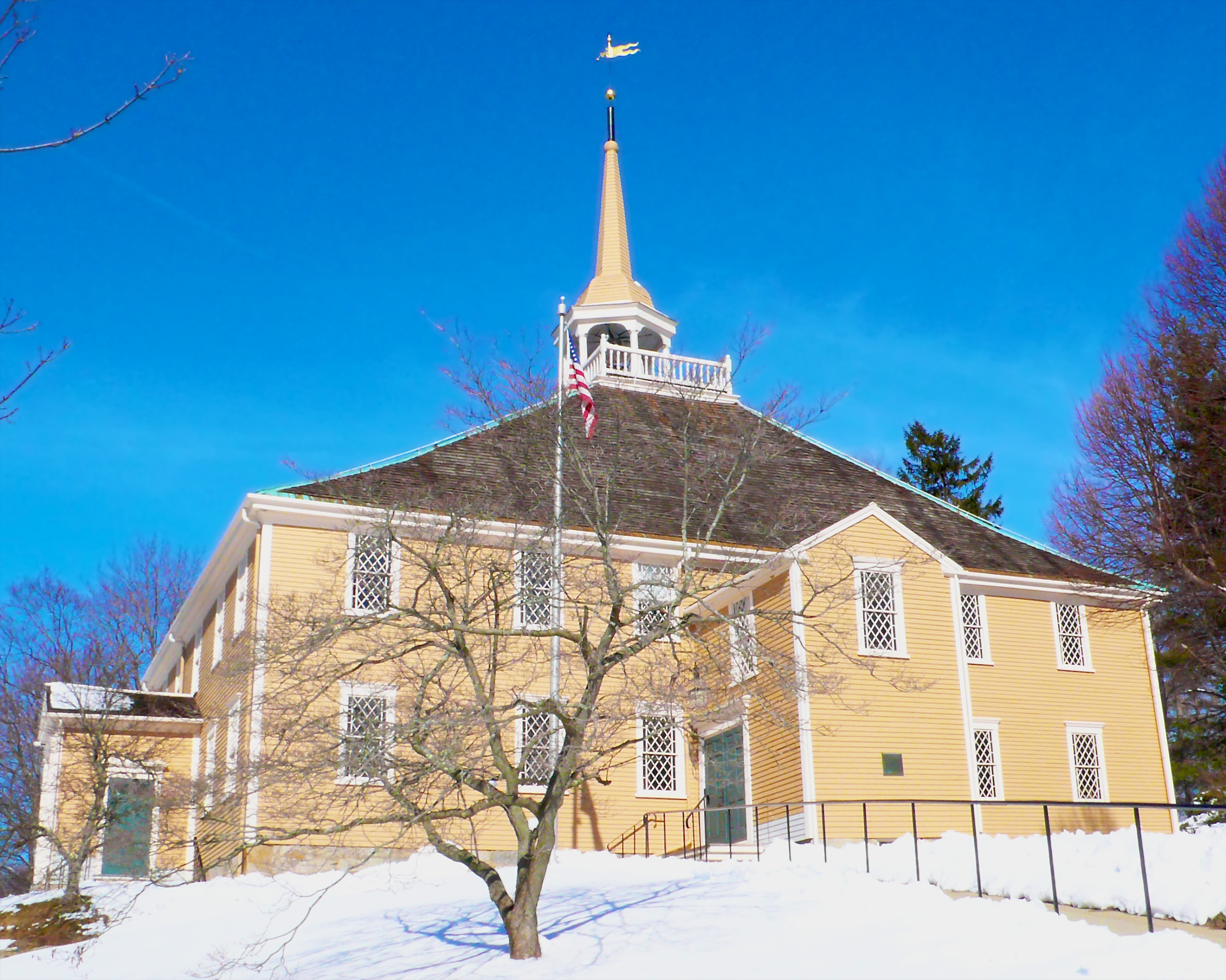
Old Ship Church (1681), Hingham, Massachusetts, the only surviving 17th-century Puritan meeting house in the US, and the oldest church building in continuous ecclesiastical use in the nation

This list of oldest churches in the United States is divided into three parts: the oldest in the sense of oldest surviving building, and the oldest in the sense of oldest Christian church congregation, and the old church in each U.S. state. There is a distinction between old church buildings that have been in continuous use as churches, and those that have been converted to other purposes; and between buildings that have been in continuous use as churches and those that were shuttered for many decades.

In terms of congregations, they are distinguished between early established congregations that have been in continuous existence (sometimes through great theological changes), and early congregations that ceased to exist. Some of these churches are located in areas that were part of the original Thirteen Colonies that made up the United States in 1776. Others were built in states that were later annexed, such as Louisiana and New Mexico. Sites on the list are generally from the First Period of American architecture or earlier.

To be listed here a site must:

- be the oldest church in a state, large city (top 50), or oldest of its type (denomination, architectural, etc.);
- be freestanding (not a ruin or mound, as there are separate lists for those); and/or
- be the oldest congregation of its type (denomination).

== Oldest church buildings ==
San José Church	Old San Juan	PR	1528	Catholic	Located in the Old San Juan National Historic Landmark District. Additions and renovations over the centuries. The church has been on U.S. territory since Puerto Rico was annexed in 1898.
San Miguel Mission	Santa Fe, New Mexico	NM	Approximately started in 1610 or 1626	Catholic	The oldest church built in the continental US. The original adobe walls and altar were built by the Tlaxcalan Indians from Mexico under the orders of the Spaniards, but much of the structure was rebuilt in 1710. Building has been within the U.S. since 1848, when the US annexed Santa Fe de Nuevo México following the Mexican–American War.
San Agustín de la Isleta Mission	Isleta, New Mexico	NM	Founded in 1613 and completed in 1629 or 1630	Catholic	Originally built by Spanish Franciscan missionaries at the Isleta Pueblo. Like the San Miguel chapel much was rebuilt in 1710 as a result of the Pueblo Revolt. Building has been within the U.S. since 1848, when the US annexed New Mexico territory following the Mexican–American War.
Jamestown Church	Jamestown, Virginia	VA	1647 (Completed)	Anglican	Only floor tiles and foundations remain from the first brick church (with a tower added sometime earlier or later). Present building erected 1907. Oldest church in the original 13 colonies.
San Estevan Del Rey Mission Church	Acoma, New Mexico	NM	1649	Catholic	
New Castle Presbyterian Church	New Castle, Delaware	DE	1657	Presbyterian	Current Meeting House erected 1707
Old Trinity Church	Church Creek, Maryland	MD	1675	Episcopal	Church building in continuous use; as such, oldest in the continental US.
St. Mary's, Whitechapel	Lancaster County, Virginia	VA	1675	Episcopal	
Fairfield Presbyterian Church	Cumberland County, New Jersey	NJ	c. 1680	Presbyterian	Second-oldest presbyterian congregation in the United States; briefly congregationalist before adopting presbyterian church government.
Third Haven Meeting House	Talbot County, Maryland	MD	1681–84	Quaker (Friends)	Oldest Quaker meeting house in the United States.
Old Ship Church	Hingham, Massachusetts	MA	1681	Puritan, Congregational, now Unitarian Universalist	Only remaining 17th-century Puritan meetinghouse in the US.
St. Luke's Church	Smithfield, Virginia	VA	1682	Anglican, Episcopal after American Revolution, currently non-denominational and does not have a congregation.	National Historic Landmark
Old Indian Meeting House	Mashpee, Massachusetts	MA	1684	Congregational/Native American	Oldest Native American church
Old Quaker Meeting House	Flushing, New York	NY	1694	Quaker (Friends)	Oldest religious building in Queens County, New York City. The only surviving example in New York State of a typical 17th-century ecclesiastical frame structure of medieval design.
Old Dutch Church of Sleepy Hollow	Sleepy Hollow, New York	NY	1697 (completed)	Dutch Reformed	Oldest church building in New York state
Grace Church	Yorktown, Virginia	VA	1697	Episcopal	
Old Norriton Presbyterian Church	Montgomery County, Pennsylvania	PA	1698	Presbyterian	Oldest Surviving church in Pennsylvania and oldest place of worship in Pennsylvania
Holy Trinity Church (Old Swedes)	Wilmington, Delaware	DE	1698	Lutheran/Episcopal	Oldest Swedish Church in the United States
Great Friends Meeting House	Newport, Rhode Island	RI	1699	Quaker (Friends)	Quaker Meeting House, oldest surviving church in Rhode Island
Gloria Dei (Old Swedes' Church)	Philadelphia, Pennsylvania	PA	1700	Lutheran/Episcopal	Oldest surviving church in Philadelphia
Portsmouth Friends Meetinghouse	Portsmouth, Rhode Island	RI	1700	Quaker (Friends)	
Six Principle Baptist Church	North Kingstown, Rhode Island	RI	1703	Baptist	Possibly oldest surviving Baptist church building in the U.S.
St. Mary's Episcopal Church	Burlington, New Jersey	NJ	1703	Episcopal	Oldest church in New Jersey
St. Peter's Church (Talleysville, Virginia)	New Kent County, Virginia	VA	1703	Episcopal	Oldest Church in the Diocese of Virginia
Old St. Andrew's Parish Church	Charleston, South Carolina	SC	1706	Anglican	Oldest church structure in South Carolina and south of Virginia, formerly Episcopal, now the oldest property in the Anglican Church in North America.
Old Narragansett Church	Wickford, Rhode Island	RI	1707	Episcopal	Oldest surviving colonial Episcopal church in Northeastern USA
St. Michael's Church	Marblehead, Massachusetts	MA	1714	Episcopal	Oldest surviving Episcopal church building in New England on its original foundation
Merion Friends Meeting House	Merion Station, Pennsylvania	PA	1715 (completed) 1695 (started)	Quaker (Friends)	Third oldest Friends meeting house in the United States.
Old North Church	Boston, Massachusetts	MA	1723	Episcopal	Oldest active church building in Boston and a National Historic Landmark, the Old North Church (formal name: Christ Church in the City of Boston) is the location from which the famous signal lanterns are said to have been displayed for Paul Revere's midnight ride during the American Revolution.
Parish Church of St. Helena	Beaufort, South Carolina	SC	1724	Anglican	Oldest surviving colonial Anglican/Episcopal church south of Charleston
Trinity Church, Newport	Newport, Rhode Island	RI	1726	Episcopal	Oldest Episcopal Parish in Rhode Island
St. John's Episcopal Church	Hampton, Virginia	VA	1728	Episcopal	Oldest Episcopal Parish in the New World
St Francis Xavier Church	Compton, Maryland	MD	1731	Catholic	Oldest Catholic Church in original 13 colonies.
Jamesport Meeting House	Jamesport, New York	NY	1731	Congregational, now Unitarian Universalist	Oldest church and public structure on Eastern Long Island, NY
Reformed Church of Newtown	Elmhurst, New York	NY	1731	Dutch Reformed	Oldest Dutch Reformed church in Queens, New York
Brookville Reformed Church	Brookville, Long Island New York	NY	1732	Dutch Reformed	Oldest continuous church on Long Island, NY
Christ Church	Nanjemoy, Maryland	MD	1732	Episcopal	Oldest Episcopal congregation in Maryland
Santa Cruz de La Cañada	Santa Cruz, New Mexico	NM	1733	Catholic	
St. Thomas Episcopal Church	Bath, North Carolina	NC	1734	Episcopal	Oldest church in North Carolina
Old Donation Episcopal Church	Virginia Beach, Virginia	VA	1736	Episcopal	Oldest congregation in lower tidewater region of Hampton Roads (continuous congregation since 1637). Oldest church in the City of Virginia Beach.
Cathedral of San Fernando	San Antonio, Texas	TX	1738	Catholic	Oldest church in Texas. Oldest Catholic cathedral in the contiguous United States. The church was named for Ferdinand III of Castile. In 1868, the cathedral was considerably enlarged in the Gothic style.
St. Paul's Episcopal Church	Norfolk, Virginia	VA	1739	Episcopal	Oldest Surviving Building in The City of Norfolk.
Augustus Lutheran Church	Trappe, Pennsylvania	PA	1743	Lutheran	Oldest unaltered Lutheran Church in use by the same congregation
King's Chapel	Boston, Massachusetts	MA	1754	Unitarian Christian	Oldest continually used religious site in Boston, present church building 1754
St. Michael's Church	Charleston, South Carolina	SC	1752–1761	Anglican	Oldest church edifice in downtown Charleston, SC
St. Paul's Chapel	New York, New York	NY	1766	Episcopal	Oldest church building in Manhattan
St. John's Episcopal Church	Fort Washington, Maryland	MD	1767	Episcopal	Located in the Broad Creek Historic District. The building is the 4th iteration of the church since the original was erected in 1695.
Mission San Diego de Alcala	San Diego, California	CA	1769	Catholic	First of the 21 California Missions, oldest church in use in California
The Falls Church	Falls Church, Virginia	VA	1769	Episcopal	First church in Falls Church, Virginia and established by the colonial Virginia Assembly in May 1732 for the land north of the Occoquan River
First Church of Christ, Congregational (Farmington, Connecticut)	Farmington, Connecticut	CT	1771	Congregational	Famous for its association with the Amistad
Guinston Presbyterian Church	Airville, Pennsylvania	PA	1774	Presbyterian	Guinston has records dating back to 1753. It was officially incorporated in 1754 and one of three original members of the Associate Presbytery of Pennsylvania. The Historic Stone Meeting house was constructed in 1773–1774. Prior to that they met in homes and a log construction sanctuary.
Old St. Luke's Church	Scott Township, Pennsylvania	PA	1774	Episcopal	Oldest church west of the Allegheny Mountains in Pennsylvania. Originally a log building, it was replaced by a frame church in 1790, and then the existing stone church in 1852.
St. Gabriel Catholic Church	St. Gabriel, Louisiana	LA	1776	Catholic	Oldest church in the Mississippi River Valley
Barratt's Chapel	Frederica, Delaware	DE	1780	Methodist	Second oldest Methodist church building in the U.S. built for that purpose (the oldest is St. George's in Philadelphia, PA, built in 1769)
Mission San Juan Capistrano	San Juan Capistrano	CA	1782	Catholic	
Holy Resurrection Orthodox Church	Kodiak	AK	1795	Eastern Orthodox	The first Eastern Orthodox Church to be built in the United States. The building has burned down multiple times and the current building was built in 1945.
Mission San Xavier del Bac	Tucson	AZ	1797	Catholic	The mission was founded in 1692, and the current structure was completed in 1797.
Center Church on the Green	New Haven, Connecticut	CT	1814	Congregational	
Basilica of St. Joseph Proto-Cathedral	Bardstown, Kentucky	KY	1816	Catholic	The proto-cathedral is the first Catholic Cathedral west of the Allegheny Mountains.
Brunswick United Methodist Church	Brunswick, Ohio	OH	1817	Methodist	The oldest church in Medina County and the second oldest in the Western Reserve. Still active today. Was expanded in 2002.
Wyandot Mission Church	Upper Sandusky	OH	1824	Methodist	The oldest Methodist mission church in America
Beech Cumberland Presbyterian Church	Hendersonville	TN	1828	Cumberland Presbyterian	The oldest church in Middle Tennessee. Beech was organized as a Presbyterian church in 1798. The first Synod of the Cumberland Presbyterian Church was constituted here on October 5, 1813. In 1828, the stone building was erected with three-foot thick walls, replacing the original meetinghouse.

== Oldest continuous church congregations ==
Cathedral Basilica of St. Augustine.		St. Augustine, Florida	FL	1565	Catholic	Oldest parish in continuous existence in the United States of America. Parish established September 8, 1565, as San Agustin de La Florida, by Spanish conqueror Don Pedro Menendez de Aviles. Parish records since 1594 available in the Archives of the Diocese of St. Augustine.
San Juan Bautista Church		Ohkay Owingeh (formerly, San Juan Pueblo), New Mexico	NM	1598	Catholic	Oldest Native American congregation in the United States, and one of the oldest congregations in the United States
St. John's Episcopal Church (Hampton, Virginia)		Hampton, Virginia	VA	1610	Episcopal	Oldest English-speaking parish in continuous existence in the United States of America, current building from 1728
West Parish Church		West Barnstable, Massachusetts	MA	1616	United Church of Christ	Oldest church congregation on Cape Cod. Founded in 1616 in England by Rev. Henry Jacob by breaking with the Church of England. The second Pastor, Rev. John Lothropp, and 32 followers were imprisoned in 1632 by the Crown, and then released in 1634 on condition that they leave England. In 1639 Lothropp and 22 families found the town of Barnstable.
First Parish Church in Plymouth		Plymouth, Massachusetts	MA	1620	Originally Separatist (Calvinist) Congregational, now Unitarian Universalist	-
First Church in Weymouth		Weymouth, Massachusetts	MA	1623	Congregational	Oldest Congregational church gathered in the United States.
Marble Collegiate Church		New York, New York	NY	1628	Reformed and United Church of Christ	Oldest church congregation in New York State (building from 1854)
First Church in Salem		Salem, Massachusetts	MA	1629	Originally Puritan (Calvinist) Congregational, now Unitarian Universalist	First Puritan Church in North America and second Congregational Church in America. Building constructed in 1838.
First Church of Windsor		Windsor, Connecticut	CT	1630	Congregational	Oldest congregation in Connecticut
First Church in Boston		Boston, Massachusetts	MA	1630	Originally Puritan (Calvinist) Congregational, now Unitarian Universalist	Oldest congregation in Boston, Massachusetts (building from 1968)
First Parish Watertown (Watertown, Massachusetts)		Watertown, Massachusetts	MA	1630	Originally Puritan (Calvinist) Congregational, now Unitarian Universalist	
Christ Church		Stevensville, Maryland	MD	1631	Episcopal	Oldest congregation in Maryland, building from 1880 pictured. (current building from 1995)
First Church in Charlestown	First Church in Charlestown, now Christ Church Charlestown	Charlestown, Massachusetts	MA	1632	Originally Congregational, now Baptist	Last remaining Trinitarian church of the original six churches of the Massachusetts Bay Colony (current building constructed in 1849); now called Christ Church Charlestown.
First Parish Church (Dover, New Hampshire)		Dover, New Hampshire	NH	1632	Congregational	Oldest congregation in New Hampshire (current building from 1825)
Center Church (The First Church of Christ in Hartford)		Hartford, Connecticut	CT	1632	Congregational	Oldest congregation in Hartford (current building from 1807)
Old Donation Episcopal Church		Virginia Beach, Virginia	VA	1637	Episcopal	Oldest congregation in lower tidewater region of Hampton Roads (current church from 1736). Oldest congregation in the City of Virginia Beach.
First Baptist Church in America		Providence, Rhode Island	RI	1638	Baptist	First Baptist Church founded in America, oldest church congregation in Rhode Island, oldest Baptist congregation in America (building from 1775)
First Church (Sandwich, Massachusetts)		Sandwich, Massachusetts	MA	1638	Congregational church	First Congregational Church founded in Cape Cod by Mayflower Pilgrims, second oldest church congregation in Cape Cod (building from 1848)
The First Church of Christ in New Haven (Center Church on the Green)		New Haven, Connecticut	CT	1639	Congregational	
Memorial Congregational Church	Memorial Congregational Church, Sudbury Massachusetts	Sudbury, MA	MA	1640	Congregational/United Church of Christ	Established in 1640, the first meeting house built in 1643 in Wayland, MA. Moved to Sudbury in 1708. Current location and name established February 17, 1890.
Saint Ignatius Church		Chapel Point / Port Tobacco, Maryland	MD	1641	Catholic	Oldest continually active Catholic parish in the 13 colonies. Oldest Jesuit residence in the world to have been continuously occupied by that order. Current church building constructed 1798.
First Church in Albany		Albany, New York	NY	1642	Reformed	Established in 1642 to serve the Dutch inhabitants of the patroonship of Rensselaerswyck. (building from 1790s)
Newman Congregational Church		East Providence, Rhode Island	RI	1643	United Church of Christ	Gathered in 1643. Oldest Congregational church in Rhode Island.
Reformed Protestant Dutch Church of the Town of Flatbush		Brooklyn, New York	NY	1654	Protestant	
First Presbyterian Church in Jamaica		New York, New York	NY	1662	Presbyterian	Oldest Presbyterian church congregation in continuous existence
First Baptist Church in Swansea		Swansea, Massachusetts	MA	1663	Baptist	Oldest Baptist church congregation in Massachusetts
First Congregational Church of Greenwich		Greenwich, Connecticut	CT	1665	Congregational	Oldest congregation in Greenwich (wooden buildings in 1667, 1694, 1735 and 1835. Present stone building in 1896.)
Old First Church		Middletown Township, New Jersey	NJ	1668	Baptist	Oldest Baptist church in New Jersey
First Church Of Christ, Simsbury		Simsbury, Connecticut	CT	1671	Congregational	1697 is the year of the first full-time minister, although the townspeople had voted to establish a church in 1671. Various disagreements meant the first meetinghouse was not constructed until 1683.
St. Philip's Church (Charleston, South Carolina)		Charleston, South Carolina	SC	1680	Anglican	Oldest congregation in South Carolina and south of Virginia, formerly Episcopal, now the oldest congregation in the Anglican Church in North America. Present church building 1838
Fairfield Presbyterian Church		Cumberland County, New Jersey	NJ	c. 1680	Presbyterian (PCA)	Briefly congregationalist before becoming presbyterian. The previous meetinghouse, "The Old Stone Church", is on the National Register of Historic Places.
King's Chapel		Boston, Massachusetts	MA	1686	Unitarian Christian	Oldest continually used religious site in Boston, present church building 1754
Pennepek Baptist Church		Philadelphia, Pennsylvania	PA	1688	Baptist	Oldest Baptist church in Pennsylvania
Brandywine Baptist Church (Chadds Ford, PA)		Chadds Ford, Pennsylvania	PA	1692	Baptist	Oldest Baptist Church in America West of Philadelphia
First Presbyterian Church in Philadelphia		Philadelphia, Pennsylvania	PA	1692	Presbyterian	
United Congregational Church, Bridgeport	A tan brick building with a wood-style north star cross	Bridgeport, Connecticut	CT	1695	Congregational	
Christ Church, Philadelphia	VIEW OF EXTERIOR FROM SE - Christ Church, 22-26 North Second Street, Philadelphia, HABS PA,51-PHILA,7-37	Philadelphia, Pennsylvania	PA	1695	Episcopal	Oldest Episcopal congregation in Pennsylvania.
Christ's Church, Rye		Rye, New York	NY	1695	Episcopal	Parish formed 1695; first church built 1706 (current building dates from 1868).
First Parish Church (Waltham, Massachusetts)		Waltham, Massachusetts	MA	1696	Unitarian Universalist	
Trinity Church, New York		New York, NY	NY	1697	Episcopal	Chartered by King William III in 1697.
Trinity Church, Newport		Newport, Rhode Island	RI	1698	Episcopal	Oldest Episcopal Parish in Rhode Island
St. Thomas, Whitemarsh Township, Pennsylvania		Whitemarsh Township, Pennsylvania	PA	1698	Episcopal	One of the oldest Episcopal churches in the US. Current building is the fourth.
St. Peter's Episcopal Church (Perth Amboy, New Jersey)		Perth Amboy, New Jersey	NJ	1698	Episcopal	Oldest Episcopal parish in New Jersey (current building from 1849). Graveyard contains the oldest gravestone in New Jersey
Church of the Holy Family (Cahokia, Illinois)		Cahokia, Illinois	IL	1699	Catholic	Oldest church of any denomination west of the Allegheny Mountains in the original 1783 boundaries of the US. At the time, this territory was part of New France, and this parish was founded by missionaries from Quebec. Historic log church constructed 1786 - 1799.
Ste. Anne de Detroit		Detroit, Michigan	MI	1701	Catholic	Second oldest Catholic parish in the United States. Founded in 1701 two days after the founding of Detroit by Lord Cadillac. Current building from 1886.
Trinity Church (Swedesboro, New Jersey)		Swedesboro, New Jersey	NJ	1703	Episcopal (originally Swedish Lutheran)	First Swedish congregation in New Jersey
Trinity Episcopal Church (Woodbridge, New Jersey)		Woodbridge, New Jersey	NJ	1703	Episcopal	One of the 1703 Episcopal parishes in New Jersey (current building from 1861)
St. Michael's Church, Trenton, New Jersey		Trenton, New Jersey	NJ	1703	Episcopal	One of the 1703 Episcopal parishes in New Jersey (current building from 1810)
St. Mary's Episcopal Church, Burlington, New Jersey		Burlington, New Jersey	NJ	1703	Episcopal	One of the 1703 Episcopal parishes in New Jersey (oldest Episcopal church building in New Jersey)
Ewing Covenant Presbyterian Church		Ewing, New Jersey	NJ	1709	Presbyterian	
Parish Church of St. Helena		Beaufort, South Carolina	SC	1712	Anglican	
Bangor Episcopal Church		Churchtown, Caernarvon, PA	PA	1722	Episcopal	
Weaverland Anabaptist Faith Community		East Earl, Pennsylvania	PA	1723	Anabaptist	Fleeing religious persecution and seeking economic opportunities, Mennonites accepted William Penn's invitation to settle in Pennsylvania, arriving in Germantown as early as 1683 before some ventured westward. In the early 18th century, the Weber brothers Jacob, Henry, George, and John emigrated from the Palatinate to Lancaster County before 1718. By 1723, the first three had founded the Weaverland settlement along the fertile Conestoga Creek, drawing in more families. A congregation organized by 1733, with ministers conducting services in settlers' homes.
St. James Episcopal Church, Wilmington, NC	St. James Parish, Wilmington, NC	Wilmington	NC	1729	Episcopal	Chartered as part of the Church of England in 1729, St. James Parish is one of the oldest worshiping congregations in NC. The current church building was completed in 1839.
Stanwich Church	Stanwich Church in 1804	Greenwich	CT	1731	Historically Congregational; Presently Non-Denominational	Stanwich Church was founded by 13 farmers in 1731 and met at the corner of Taconic and North Stanwich through 1923 when it burned down. The body met at 237 Taconic until 2006, when it moved into its present location of 202 Taconic Road.
Christ Church		Savannah	GA	1733	Episcopal	Christ Church was the first church established in the Province of Georgia, and is referred to as "the Mother Church of Georgia". The current building was completed in 1838.
Trinity Church (Boston)		Boston, Massachusetts	MA	1733	Episcopal	After its former site on Summer Street burned in the Great Boston Fire of 1872, the current church complex was erected under the direction of Rector Phillips Brooks (1835–1893), one of the best-known and most charismatic preachers of his time.
Old St. Joseph's Parish		Philadelphia, Pennsylvania	PA	1733	Catholic	Oldest Catholic congregation in Pennsylvania. Present church building opened in 1757.
Most Blessed Sacrament Parish		Bally, Pennsylvania	PA	1741	Catholic	Oldest Catholic church in Pennsylvania still in continuous use in original building, originally named St. Paul's Chapel
St. John's Episcopal Church		New Milford, Connecticut	CT	1742	Episcopal	Present church building opened circa 1870.
Grace Episcopal Church		Keswick, Virginia	VA	1745	Episcopal	
Stone Chapel Methodist Church		New Windsor, Maryland	MD	1760	Methodist	The congregation is the oldest Methodist congregation in North America, founded in 1760 by Robert Strawbridge, one of John Wesley's earliest converts. Strawbridge began the first class (Methodist Society) meeting in his own home and the home of Andrew Poulson. Many services were held under a white oak tree; known as the Strawbridge Oak, located on the Poulson property. This began a congregation of Methodists which continues to meet to this day. A log meeting House was erected in 1763 named Poulson's chapel. The Methodist congregation met here until the first Stone Chapel Methodist Church was completed in 1783.
Bethel Presbyterian Church (Clover, South Carolina)		Clover, SC	SC	1764	Presbyterian (PCA)	
Congaree Baptist Church (Gadsden, South Carolina)		Gadsden, SC	SC	1765	Baptist	Second oldest Baptist congregation in South Carolina (current building constructed in 1810)
John Street Methodist Church		New York City	NY	1766	Methodist	The congregation is the second oldest Methodist congregation in North America (oldest is Stone Chapel in New Windsor, Md), founded on October 12, 1766, as the Wesleyan Society in America (building built in 1841)
St. George's Methodist Church		Philadelphia	PA	1769	Methodist	Oldest Methodist church building in continuous use in the United States (congregation founded in 1767)
Barratt's Chapel		Kent County, Delaware	Delaware	1780	Methodist	oldest surviving church building in the United States built by and for Methodists
Chester-Bethel Church		Wilmington, Delaware	Delaware	1780	Methodist	Oldest Methodist congregation that has continuously gathered in the state of DE (building from 1873).
First Presbyterian Church (Greeneville, Tennessee)		Greeneville, Tennessee	TN	1780	Presbyterian	Oldest Presbyterian congregation that has continuously gathered in the state Tennessee (building from 1848).
Mother Bethel AME Church		Philadelphia	PA	1794	African Methodist Episcopal (AME)	AME Church and denomination (1816) founded in Philadelphia; oldest congregation in the United States (building from 1890)
Basilica of St. Joseph Proto-Cathedral		Bardstown, Kentucky.	KY	1816	Catholic	The proto-cathedral is the first Catholic Cathedral west of the Allegheny Mountains.
Cathedral Church of St. Paul		Detroit	MI	1824	Episcopal	Oldest Episcopal congregation in Michigan (present building from 1907)

== By state ==
=== Alabama ===
- Indian Springs Baptist Church, possibly the oldest surviving church building. Circa 1825.
- Cathedral Basilica of the Immaculate Conception, Mobile, congregation established in 1703, took current name in 1781, current building completed in 1850 (Catholic)
- Mt. Calvary Presbyterian Church, Clay, AL. Founded in 1806.
- Flint River Primitive Baptist Church, founded in 1808 (Baptist)
- Hurricane Baptist Church, Gilbertown, AL, founded in 1816 (Baptist)
- Canaan Baptist Church, Bessemer, was founded in 1818 (Southern Baptist).
- Round Island Baptist Church (Athens, Limestone County) was founded in 1817.
- Old Salem Baptist Church, Monroe County was founded in Nov. 1817 and is still an active church.

=== Alaska ===
- Church of the Holy Ascension, oldest church building, built in 1826 (Eastern Orthodox)
- St. Michael's Cathedral (Sitka, Alaska) (Eastern Orthodox)
- Russian Orthodox Church in Kodiak Alaska, oldest congregation, founded in 1794 (Eastern Orthodox)
- Sitka Lutheran Church, oldest Protestant church congregation, founded in 1839 (Lutheran)

=== Arkansas ===
- Rockport First United Methodist Church, Rockport (near Malvern), oldest continually operating congregation in the state, organized in 1816
- Smyrna Church, Searcy, oldest church building in the state, built in 1856 (Methodist)

=== Arizona ===
- Mission San Xavier del Bac, oldest church building, built 1780–1797 (Catholic)
- St. Paul's Episcopal Church (Tombstone, Arizona), oldest Protestant church, built in 1882 (Episcopal)

=== California ===
- Mission San Diego de Alcalá, oldest congregation, founded in 1769 (Catholic)
- Basilica of San Carlos Borromeo de Carmelo Mission (Carmel Mission), founded by Fr. Junipero Serra in 1770, making it the second of the 21 California missions.
- Mission San Juan Capistrano, built in 1782 (Catholic)
- First Baptist Church, San Francisco, founded in 1849, sharing oldest Protestant church congregation with Old First Presbyterian Church (Baptist)
- Old First Presbyterian Church, San Francisco, sharing oldest Protestant church congregation with First Baptist Church, founded in 1849 (Presbyterian)
- Emmanuel Church in Coloma, oldest Protestant church building, built in 1855 (Methodist/Episcopal)
- Trinity+St. Peter's Church (Episcopal), San Francisco, oldest Episcopal church congregation west of the Mississippi, founded 1849 as Trinity Church (Episcopal)
- St. John's Church in Sacramento, Built in 1867 (Evangelical Lutheran)

=== Colorado ===
- Our Lady of Guadalupe Catholic Church in Antonito, oldest church building and congregation, built in 1857 (Catholic)
- St. James Methodist Church in Central City, oldest Protestant church in Colorado still used as a church, oldest Protestant congregation (1859) and oldest Protestant church in the state (1871) (Methodist)

=== Connecticut ===
- Abington Congregational Church, oldest church building, built in 1751 (Congregational/United Church of Christ)
- First Church of Windsor, oldest church congregation, founded in 1633 (Congregational/United Church of Christ)
- First Church of Christ and the Ancient Burying Ground, Founded 1632 in Charlestown, Massachusetts. (Congregational/United Church of Christ)
- First Church of Christ, oldest Church building in Glastonbury, founded 1693
- Lakeville Methodist Church, oldest standing Methodist church in New England.
- Stanwich Church, oldest church congregation, founded in 1731 in Greenwich, CT as Stanwich Congregational Church.

=== Delaware ===
- Holy Trinity Church (Old Swedes), oldest church building in Delaware, built in 1698 (Lutheran/Episcopal)
- Old First Presbyterian Church (Wilmington, Delaware), first Presbyterian church established in Wilmington, constructed 1746 (Presbyterian)
- Barratt's Chapel, oldest surviving church building in the United States built by and for Methodists (built in 1780), known as the "Cradle of Methodism" in America.
- Chester-Bethel Church, established 1780, oldest Methodist congregation which has continuously gathered in the state of DE.

=== Florida ===
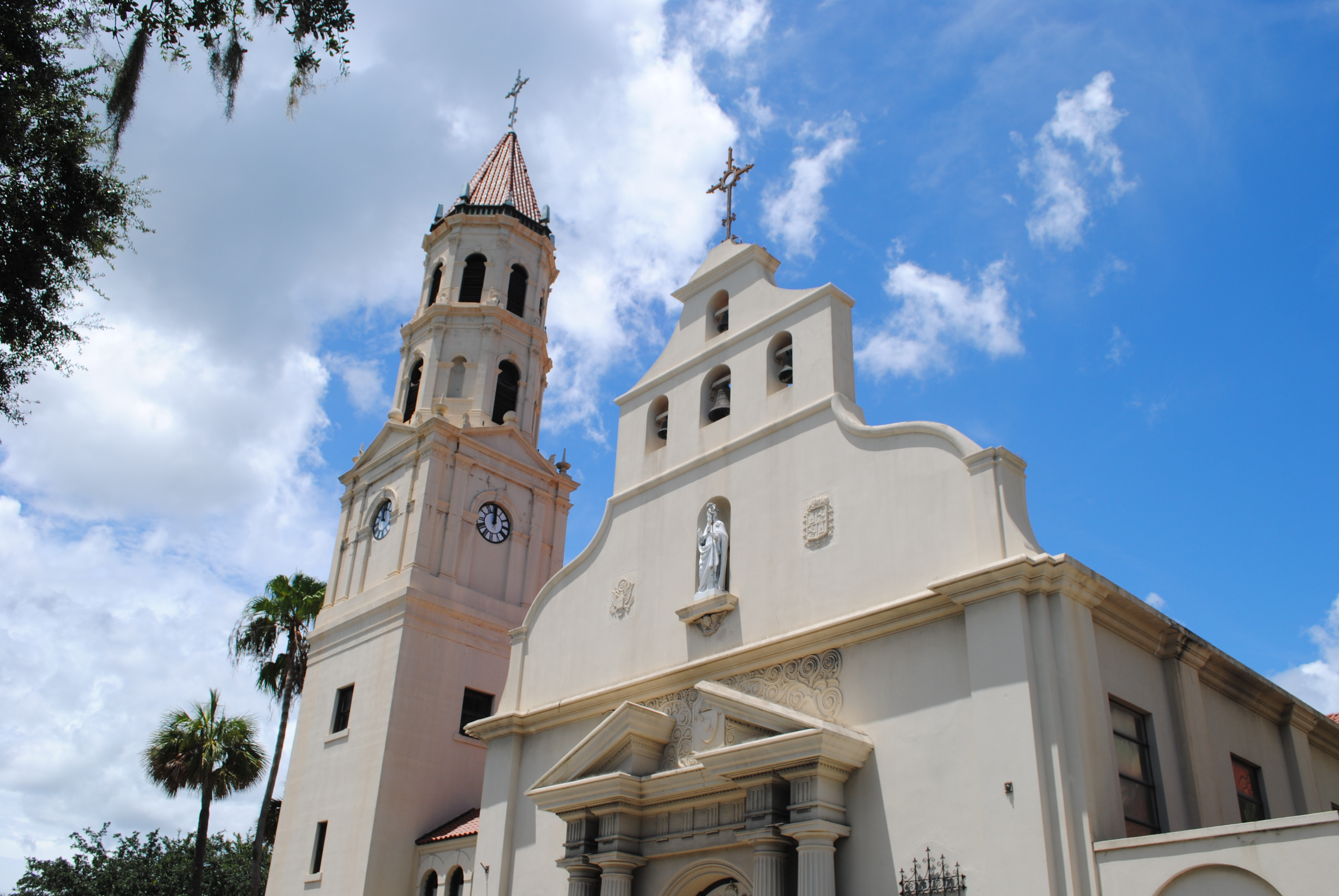
Spanish colonists began constructing the Cathedral Basilica of St. Augustine in 1793

- Cathedral Basilica of St. Augustine. Parish established September 8, 1565. Present church cornerstone laid in 1793, dedicated in 1797. Elevated to Cathedral when Diocese of St. Augustine was created in 1870. Became Basilica in 1976.
- Trinity Episcopal Church in St. Augustine is Florida's second oldest Episcopal Church. It opened its doors in 1831. Trinity remains on its original site, and with its original steeple that was completed in 1837.
- Old Christ Church (Pensacola, Florida). Oldest church in Florida on its original foundation, incorporated by an act of the Territorial Legislature in 1829, built in 1832. The building was desecrated during the American Civil War, restored, deconsecrated in the past 20 years and is now owned and operated by The Old Christ Church Foundation and the University of West Florida Historical Trust. The congregation is now located in [new] Christ Church, 18 West Wright Street, Pensacola, built in 1905 (Episcopal).
- Bethel Baptist Church (Lakeland, Florida) Bethel church congregation first met on this site in 1851 and has met continually since then. Performed baptisms in “Indian Pond” until the 1940s. A Sanctuary was Built in 1928. (Southern Baptist)
- Mount Beasor Primitive Baptist Church (Sopchoppy, Florida) established in 1853 (Baptist).
- St. John's Episcopal Church (Tallahassee, Florida). St. John's is the mother church of the Diocese of Florida. It was founded as a mission parish in 1829, and the church's first building was erected in 1837. The Diocese was organized at St. John's in 1838 and Francis Huger Rutledge, who became rector of St. John's in 1845, was consecrated the first Bishop of Florida in 1851. The original church burned in 1879; a new church was built on the same site and consecrated in 1888, and it is still the parish's principal place of worship.
- Middleburg United Methodist Church (3925 Main Street, Middleburg, FL 32068), oldest Methodist Meeting House in the State of Florida. Historical Marker states it was founded on or before July 27, 1828, by Isaac Boring, with the first church erected in 1847. It was built mostly by slaves, who retained a pew in the back of the church. The church bell tolled for the first time on February 29, 1860.
- Trinity Episcopal Cathedral, Miami, the cathedral of the Episcopal Diocese of Southeast Florida, is the oldest church in the original city limits of Miami.
- Trinity Memorial United Methodist House of Worship (Fernandina Beach, Florida) was established in 1822 by Elijah Sinclair. It is the oldest continuous operating Methodist church in Florida. The church originally had an integrated congregation. Following the Civil War, the congregation split into Trinity United Methodist Church (it remained integrated) and Memorial United Methodist Church. Trinity UMC is located at the corner of 8th and Ash in an 1892 structure. Memorial UMC is located at 601 Centre Street in a 1920 structure. Both churches are located in historic downtown Fernandina Beach

=== Georgia ===
- Christ Church (Episcopal) is the Mother Church of Georgia. It was founded in 1733 and assigned its land plot by General James Oglethorpe.
- Saint Paul's Church (Episcopal) was built in 1751 at Fort Augusta. Located on the corner of 6th and Reynolds Streets and is the oldest congregation in Augusta.
- Jerusalem Lutheran Church, oldest church building in Georgia, built in 1769 (Lutheran)
- First African Baptist Church (Savannah, Georgia), claims continuous ties with Silver Bluff Baptist Church congregation as oldest black Baptist congregation, 1774-1775 (Baptist)
- Springfield Baptist Church (Augusta, Georgia) also has continuous congregational ties to Silver Bluff Baptist Church (Baptist)
- Antioch Christian Church (Watkinsville, Georgia). The oldest Disciples of Christ congregation in Georgia, established in 1806.

=== Hawaii ===
- Mokuaikaua Church, oldest church congregation and building, founded in 1820, built in 1837 (Congregational)
- Kawaiahao Church, oldest church congregation, founded in 1820, current structure dedicated in 1842 (Congregational)
- Cathedral Basilica of Our Lady of Peace, oldest Catholic church congregation and building, founded in 1827, current structure dedicated in 1843 (Catholic)

=== Idaho ===
- Christ Chapel (Boise, Idaho), oldest Protestant church, built in 1866 (Episcopal)
- Old Mission, oldest church building in Idaho, built in 1848 (Catholic)

=== Illinois ===
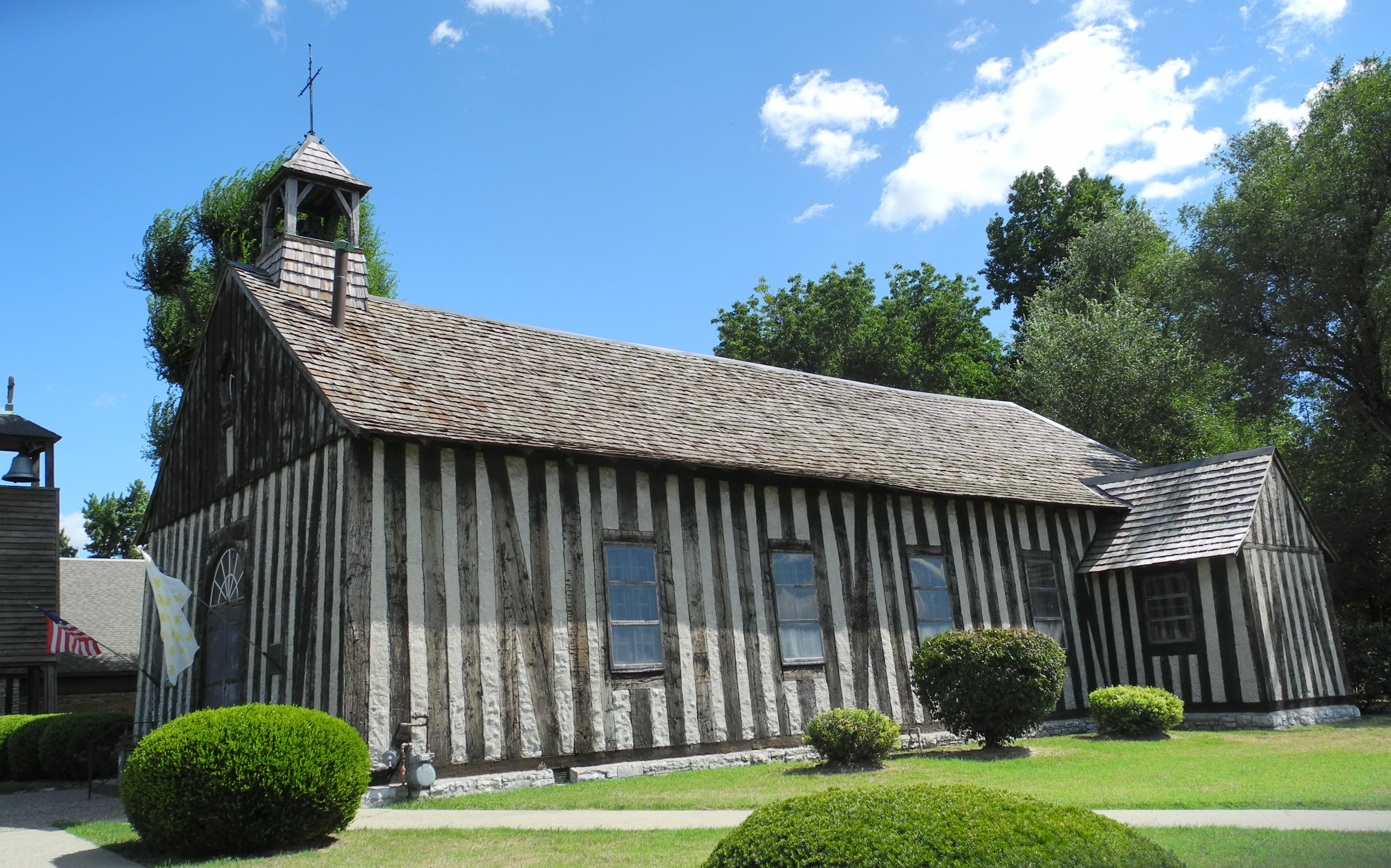
The Log Church of the Church of the Holy Family in Cahokia is a well-preserved example of poteaux-sur-solle construction

- Church of the Holy Family (Cahokia), oldest church building, built in 1799 (Catholic)
- Flat Creek Missionary Baptist Church (East Carondelet), Established 1809. Due to its location (Flat Creek Bottom), the people in the area began referring to the church as Flat Creek Baptist Church, although the members officially named the church, "The Missionary Baptist Church of East Carondelet".
- Shiloh United Methodist Church (Shiloh, Illinois) established 1807. Current building same location 1825.
- Mulkeytown Christian Church, established 1818, is the oldest Independent Christian Church. It is now a part of the fellowship of Christian Churches and Churches of Christ or the "Independent Christian Church" a group which separated from the Disciples of Christ beginning in 1924. The oldest congregation still affiliated with the Christian Church (Disciples of Christ) is Barney's Priarie in Mt. Carmel, established 1816.

=== Indiana ===
- Old Cathedral Complex, oldest congregation, founded in 1749 (Catholic)
- Stony Point Christian Church, Charlestown, oldest Protestant congregation in Indiana, constituted in 1789
- Little Cedar Grove Baptist Church, oldest church building, built in 1812 (Baptist)
- Blue River Friends Hicksite Meeting House and Cemetery, oldest meeting house, built in 1815 (Quaker)

=== Iowa ===
- St. Raphael's Cathedral (Dubuque, Iowa), oldest church congregation in Iowa, founded in 1833 (Catholic)
- St. Anthony's Catholic Church (Davenport, Iowa), oldest church building, built in 1838 (Catholic)

=== Kansas ===
- White Church Christian Church (Disciples of Christ), oldest continuous church congregation, founded in 1832
- Beecher Bible and Rifle Church, Wabaunsee, Kansas, built in 1862, possibly oldest church building

=== Kentucky ===
- Cane Ridge Meeting House, Possibly the oldest church building, built in 1791 (Presbyterian and Disciples of Christ)
- First Baptist Church of Somerset in Pulaksi County. Built and established in 1799.
- Hopeful Lutheran Church, in Boone County, organized in 1806 by a group of colonists from Virginia
- Onton United Methodist Church, Webster County, Kentucky, established 1820
- The Basilica of Saint Joseph Proto-Cathedral in Bardstown, Kentucky. is the first Catholic Cathedral west of the Allegheny Mountains
- Saint Charles Church in Lebanon. KY., established 1786, built in 1832.
- Saint Augustine Church in Lebanon. KY., established 1813, built in 1821.
- Holy Cross Church in Lebanon. KY., established 1785, built in 1823. Holy Cross, known as the birthplace of Catholicism in Kentucky
- Saint Rose Church in Springfield KY., established 1806, built in 1855. The proto-priory remains the oldest Dominican religious house in the country.

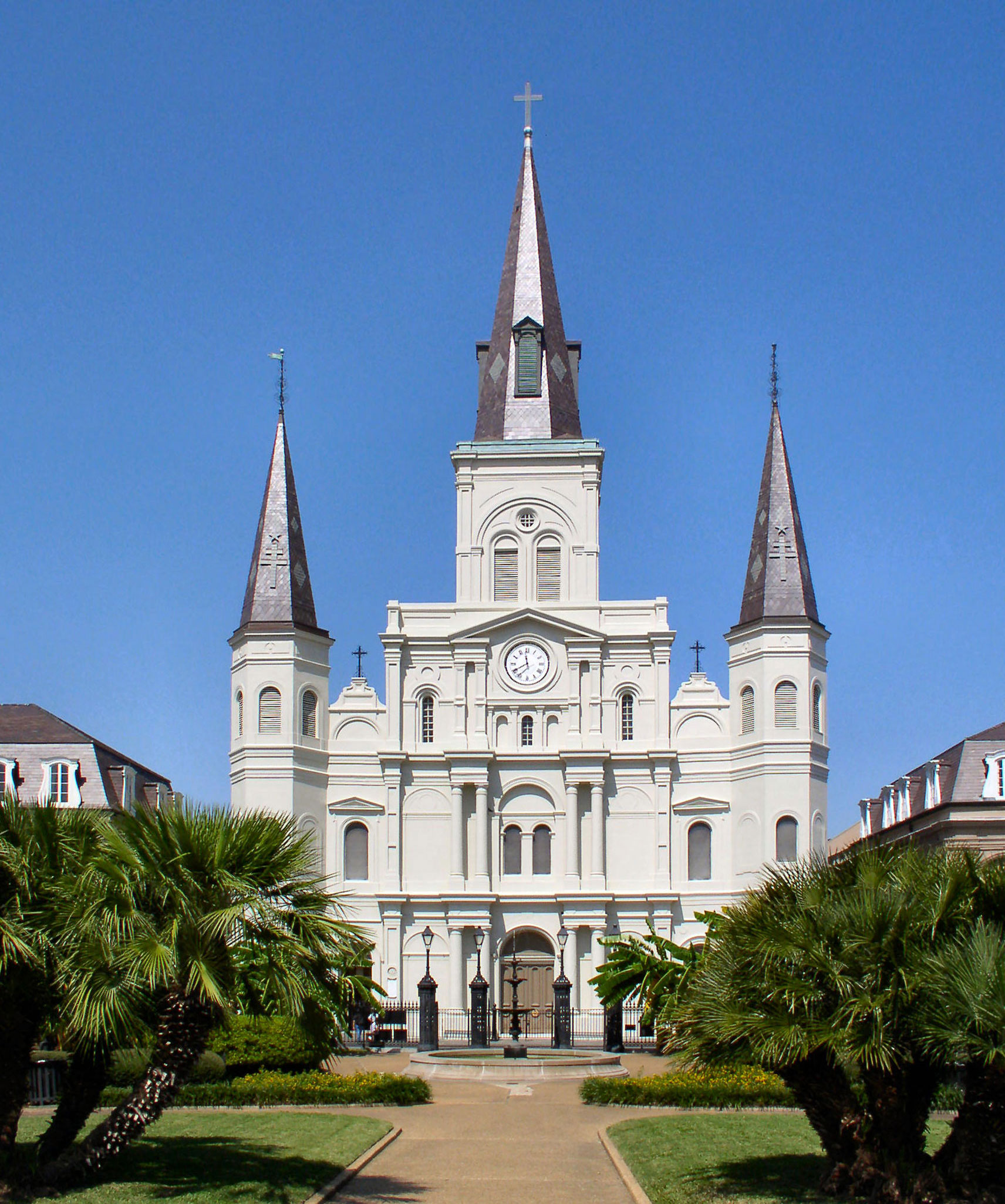
The congregation of the St. Louis Cathedral, New Orleans was founded in 1718

=== Louisiana ===
- St. Gabriel Catholic Church, oldest church building in the Mississippi River Valley, completed in 1772. (Catholic)
- St. Louis Cathedral, New Orleans, oldest congregation in Louisiana, founded in 1718, current building built in 1793. (Catholic)
- St. Martin of Tours Catholic Church (St. Martinville, Louisiana), oldest congregation in the Diocese of Lafayette, established in 1765, current building completed in 1844. (Catholic)
- Christ Church Cathedral, New Orleans, oldest Protestant church congregation in Louisiana, founded in 1818, current building completed in 1886. (Episcopal)

=== Maine ===
- First Congregational Church and Parsonage (Kittery, Maine), possibly the oldest church building in Maine, built in 1703 (Congregational).
- First Parish Congregational Church of York, Maine. Oldest church congregation, (Congregational/United Church of Christ) founded before 1672, organized in the Congregational tradition by Shubael Dummer.

=== Maryland ===
- Christ Church Parish Kent Island, 1631, oldest continuously worshipping congregation in Maryland
- Old Trinity Church, Maryland, 1675, Episcopal, building in continuous use; as such, oldest in the US.
- Third Haven Meeting House, oldest Quaker building in the US, built in 1682
- St. Anne's Church (Annapolis, Maryland), founded in 1692
- Rehoboth Presbyterian Church (Somerset County, MD), the oldest Presbyterian Church in continuous use (USA), built in 1706
- St. Francis Xavier Church and Newtown Manor House Historic District, congregation originated from a Jesuit mission started in 1640, surviving building dates to 1731
- Sacred Heart Church (Bowie, Maryland) Built 1741
- Salem Reformed Church, in Hagerstown, Maryland, Washington County, Maryland (1747)
- St. Paul's Church, in Clear Spring, Maryland, Washington County (1747)
- Evangelical Lutheran Church (Frederick, Maryland) (1762)
- St. John's Episcopal Church, 1767, is located in the Broad Creek Historic District.
- All Saints' Church (Sunderland, Maryland) (1692), surviving building dates to 1777
- Old Otterbein, oldest church edifice in continuous use in the city of Baltimore (built 1785–1786) and the mother church of the United Brethren in Christ.
- St. James Episcopal Church (Baltimore, Maryland) at Lafayette Square, oldest African American congregation south of the Mason–Dixon line (1824)

=== Massachusetts ===
- First Church in Plymouth, oldest congregation founded 1620 (building 1899), (Puritan, Congregational, now Unitarian Universalist)
- First Church in Weymouth, gathered in 1623 (building 1833), (Puritan, Congregational)
- First Parish Church in Dorchester, organized March 20, 1630 (originally Puritan Congregational, now Unitarian Universalist)
- First Church in Boston, organized August 27, 1630; Church Covenant signed July 30, 1630. (Originally Puritan Congregational, now Unitarian Universalist)
- First Congregational Church of Marshfield, gathered in 1632 (same building since 1838) (Congregational) [1]
- First Congregational Church, First Church in Roxbury, founded/built in 1632 (majorly rebuilt 4 times, but constantly in use) (Congregational, now Unitarian Universalist. Serves as headquarters for community outreach program "UU Urban Ministry"). Unitarian Universalist Urban Ministry - Boston, MA
- First Church in Charlestown, founded in 1632 as the Church of Christ in Charlestown (and continuously meeting since). Historically Congregational, now Baptist and called Christ Church Charlestown. Last remaining Trinitarian church of the original six churches of the Massachusetts Bay Colony.
- Newman Congregational Church. Founded in 1643 by the Rev. Samuel Newman in what was then Rehoboth, Massachusetts. (Now located in East Providence, Rhode Island.)
- First Parish Congregational Church aka Stone Church by the Lake, founded in 1644, located in Wakefield. Has had 5 different meeting houses but has been continually in use.
- First Baptist Church in Swansea, oldest Baptist congregation in MA, founded in 1663 (Baptist)
- First Parish in Cambridge, founded on February 1, 1636, at the First Church (Evangelical, now Unitarian Universalist)
- First Parish Church (Waltham, Massachusetts), gathered in 1696 (Unitarian Universalist)
- St. Michael's Church (Marblehead, Massachusetts). Oldest Episcopal Church in New England on its original foundation, built 1714, and still used daily year-round. A National Historic Landmark.
- Old North Church, Official name: Christ Church in the City of Boston. Oldest standing church building in Boston, built 1723 (Episcopal) a National Historic Landmark significant for its role in the American Revolution.
- Old Ship Church, built in 1681, is one of the oldest buildings in America. The congregation was gathered in 1635. It was originally a Puritan, Congregationalist congregation, but is now affiliated with the Unitarian Universalists.
- First Parish Church in Duxbury, founded in 1632 by Elder William Brewster as a Christian Separatist Church with early members coming from the First Parish Church in Plymouth.

=== Michigan ===
- La Mission Ste. Marie, Sault Sainte Marie, First Catholic congregation in the state, founded by Fr. Jacques Marquette in 1668. There have been 5 Catholic churches on this site since 1668. In 2018 St. Mary's parish celebrates its 350th anniversary.
- Ste. Anne de Detroit Catholic Church, oldest congregation (Catholic) founded 2 days after Antoine de la Mothe Cadillac founded Detroit in 1701.
- Mission Church, Mackinac Island, oldest church building, built 1829-30 (Congregational)
- Central United Methodist Church, Detroit, First Methodist and First Protestant congregation. Established 1810. Their first church building was built in 1818. In 2010 they celebrated their 200th Anniversary.
- Cathedral Church of St. Paul (Detroit). Oldest Episcopal congregation in Michigan (1824).

=== Minnesota ===
- Saint Peter's Church (Mendota, Minnesota), oldest church in continuous use in Minnesota, built in 1853 (Catholic)
- First Presbyterian Church, Stillwater, Minn. 1860-1890.
  First Presbyterian Church (Stillwater, Minnesota), oldest Protestant congregation, founded December 8, 1849.

=== Missouri ===
- In 1764, when Pierre Laclède and Auguste Chouteau established the city of St. Louis, they dedicated a plot of land west of Laclède's home for the purposes of the Catholic Church. The earliest Catholic records suggest that a tent was used by an itinerant priest in 1766, but by 1770 a small log house was built on the site. This building, consecrated by the Reverend Pierre Gibault, on June 24, 1770, was expanded in 1776 to include a log church. The first bishop of the Diocese of St. Louis, Joseph Rosati, began construction of a new cathedral, now the Basilica of St. Louis, King of France. The cornerstone of the church was laid by Rosati during a ceremony on August 1, 1831. It is the oldest cathedral west of the Mississippi River.
- In 1791 St. Charles Borromeo was founded as a log cabin on the banks of the Missouri River and has been rebuilt 3 times. St. Charles Borromeo is also the namesake of St. Charles. (Catholic)
- In 1799, the first Protestant sermon and baptism by immersion west of the Mississippi River was performed in Randol Creek near Dutchtown.
- In 1805 or even 1804, the Tywappity Church or Tywappity Bottom Church (Baptist), named for the Scott County swamp in which it is located, was organized as the oldest Baptist Church west of the Mississippi River, but no building was erected; it was still in existence in 1837, but the congregation later united with other churches. In 1806, the Bethel (Baptist) Church was formed in Cape Girardeau County, now Jackson. Fee Fee Baptist Church in Bridgeton, oldest Protestant church congregation, founded in 1807 (Baptist)
- Around 1816, settlers started meeting together in homes for worship on the Missouri River near the present village of Rocheport 12 years after Lewis and Clark camped there in 1804. In 1837, they were chartered as the Rocheport Christian Church. The present building, built in 1847, has been in continuous use since that time. The church building and congregation have survived Missouri River floods and infestations of termites. The congregation continues with weekly Sunday School and Holy Communion. Sunday worship is held on the first Sunday of each month. A Bluegrass Worship service is held at 5 p.m. on the First Saturday night each month. In 2015, the church was named the Missouri Rural Church of the year. (Disciples of Christ)
- Christ Church Cathedral, St Louis, is the oldest Episcopal Church congregation in Missouri, founded in 1819 (Episcopalian)
- St. Ferdinand's Shrine, oldest church building, built in 1821 (Catholic)
- In 1832, The Presbyterian Church in Potosi, Missouri, the oldest Presbyterian church west of the Mississippi River to be in continuous service was organized. It is also the oldest Presbyterian church still standing west of the Mississippi River. The Whitewater Presbyterian Church in Sedgewickville, Missouri, is the oldest Presbyterian church west of the Mississippi River to be in continuous service. The Brazeau Presbyterian Church was established in 1819 with services held in a small log cabin while the current brick church was completed in 1854. (Presbyterian)

=== Mississippi ===
- Woodville Baptist Church, oldest church building, built in 1809 (Baptist)
- Jersey Settlers, Adams County, oldest Protestant congregation, 1772, Reverend Samuel Swayze
- Salem Baptist Church, Jefferson County, oldest Baptist church congregation, 1791

=== Montana ===
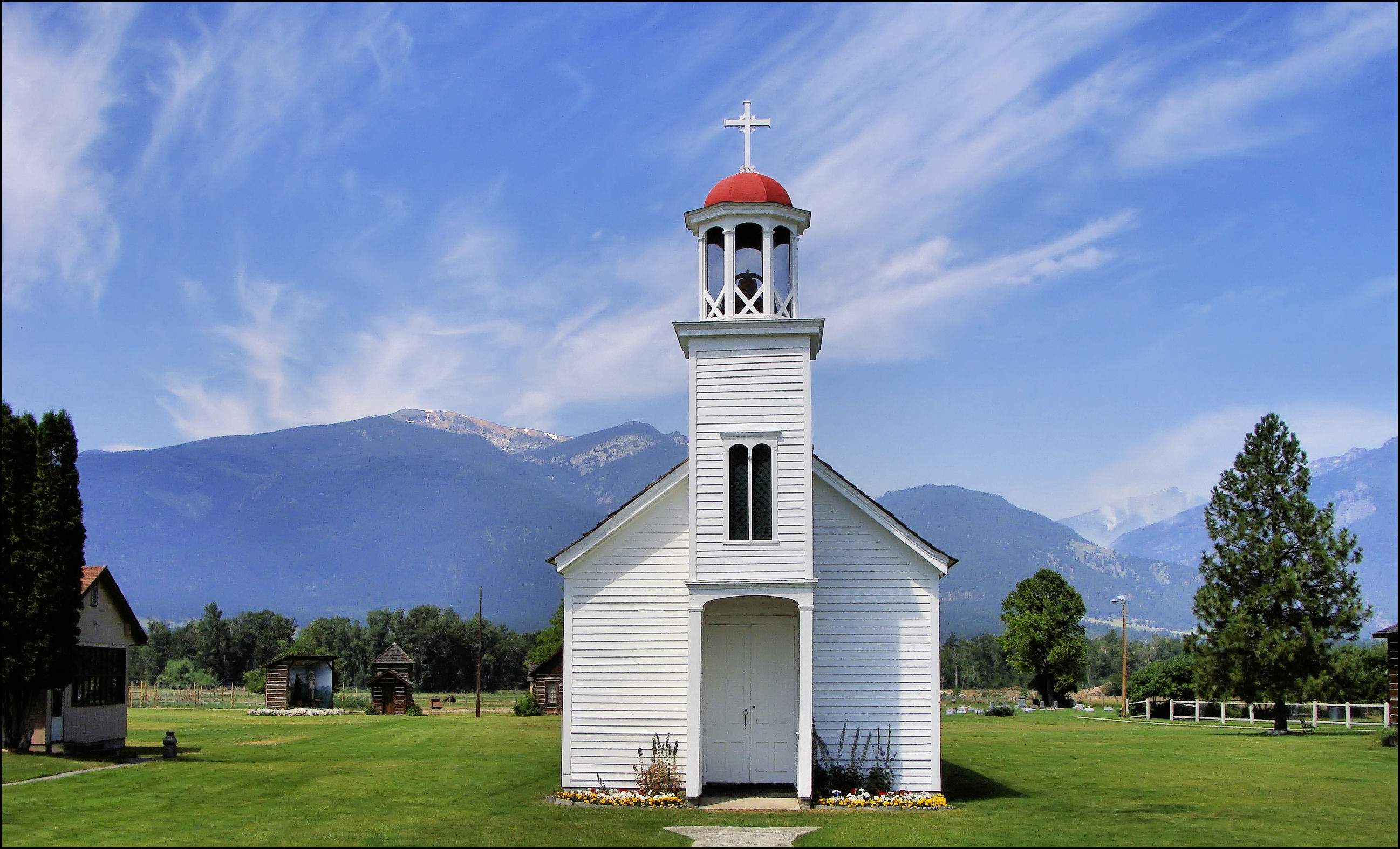
The chapel of St. Mary's Mission, which was established in 1841

- St. Mary's Mission, oldest church congregation, founded in 1841 (Catholic)
- First Baptist Church in Stevensville, possibly oldest Protestant church building, built in 1882 (Baptist)
- Billings First Congregational Church, founded in 1882 (Congregational)
- Melville Lutheran Church, founded in 1885, church building still in use (Lutheran)

=== Nebraska ===
- First Presbyterian Church of Bellevue, oldest church building, built in 1856 (Presbyterian)
- Salem Evangelical Lutheran Church of Fontanelle, oldest continuous Lutheran church in the US west of the Mississippi River, built in 1860 (Lutheran–ELCA)

=== Nevada ===
- First Presbyterian Church of Carson City, oldest church building, built in 1864 (Presbyterian)

=== New Hampshire ===
- First Parish Church in Dover, oldest congregation founded in 1632 (Congregational/United Church of Christ)
- Newington Meeting House is the oldest church building in New Hampshire (1717, Congregational).

=== New Jersey ===
- St. Mary's Episcopal Church, oldest church building, built in 1703 (Episcopal)
- Old Bergen Church, oldest church congregation, founded in 1660 (Reformed)
- Fairfield Presbyterian Church, founded c. 1680 (Presbyterian).

=== New Mexico ===
- San Miguel Mission, oldest church building, built in 1610 (Catholic)

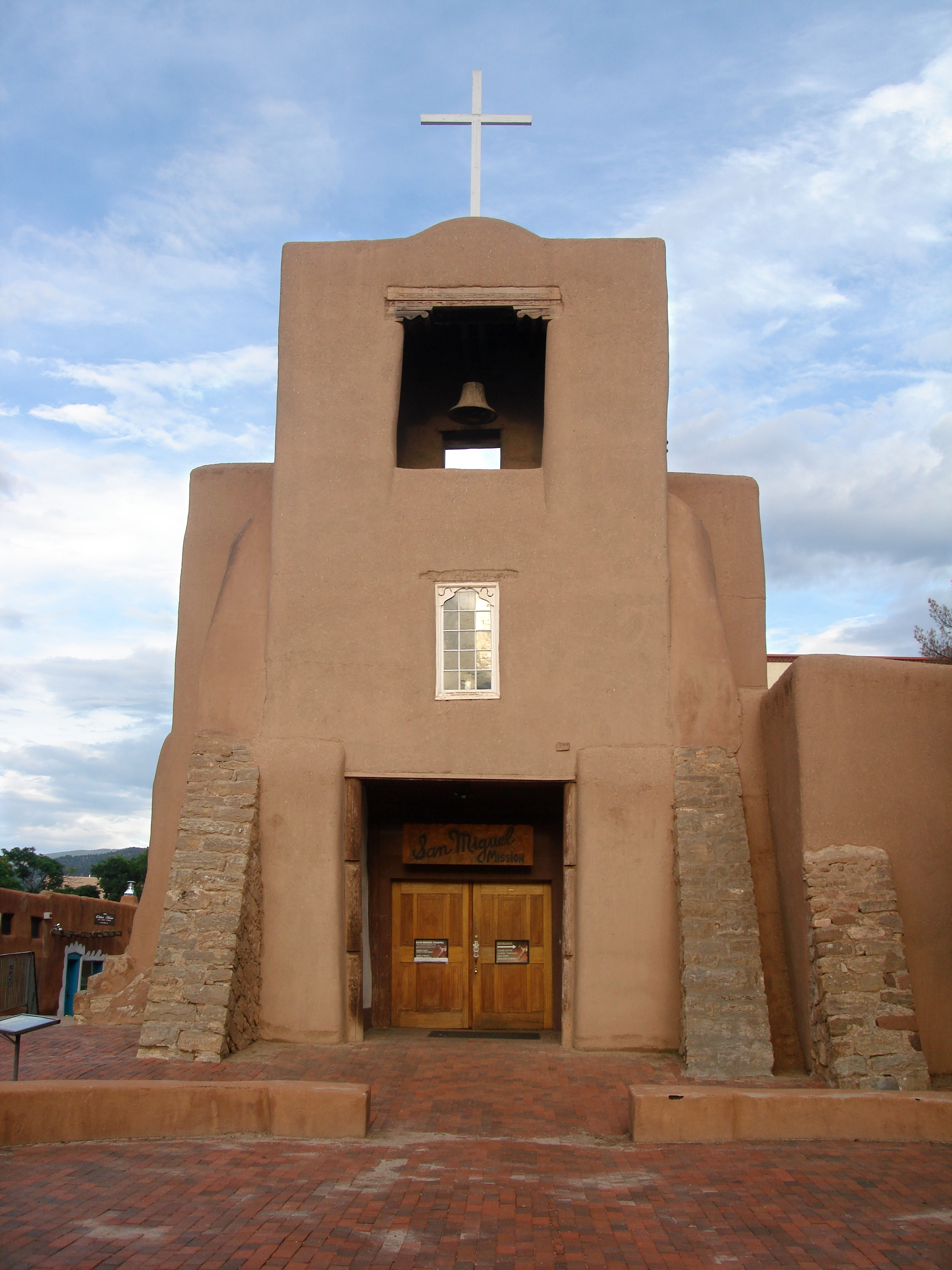

- San Juan de los Caballeros/San Juan Bautista, Established 1598, second oldest foundation in the United States (Catholic)
- First Presbyterian Church in Santa Fe, founded in 1867, oldest Protestant Church congregation in New Mexico (Presbyterian)

=== New York ===
- Marble Collegiate Church, oldest congregation founded in 1628 (building 1851) (Reformed)
- Reformed Protestant Dutch Church of the Town of Flatbush founded in 1654 (Reformed)
- Old Dutch Church of Sleepy Hollow, oldest church building, built in 1685 (Reformed)
- Christ Church of Clarkson (formerly Clarkson Community Church), Monroe County, New York, founded in 1816, built in 1825 (Baptist)
- Old Dutch Church (Kingston, New York), one of the oldest continuously existing congregations in the country, since 1659
- Shawangunk Reform Church (formerly the Dutch Reform Church) Wallkill, NY, founded in 1751.

=== North Carolina ===
- St. James Parish (Wilmington, North Carolina), established in November 1729 (Episcopal)
- St. Thomas Episcopal Church (Bath, North Carolina), oldest church building, built in 1734 (Episcopal)
- St. John's Lutheran Church, originally Dutch Buffalo Creek Church, (Concord, North Carolina), oldest Lutheran congregation, established in 1745 (ELCA)
- Cane Creek Friends Church was established in 1751 near Snow Camp, NC.
- Laurel Hill Presbyterian Church (Laurel Hill, North Carolina), established 1797 (Presbyterian).
- Faith Presbyterian Church (Laurinburg, North Carolina) establishment unknown, first mentioned in 1802. (Presbyterian)
- Bethabara Moravian Church (Winston-Salem, NC) established November 17, 1753 (Moravian), built in 1788
- Rockfish Presbyterian Church, (Wallace, North Carolina) 1756
- Philadelphia Evangelical Lutheran Church (Gaston County—Dallas, NC) established 1767.
- Brook's Chapel Church (Polksville, North Carolina), established in 1869 (Methodist)
- Wheat Swamp Christian Church (Disciples of Christ), Kinston, Established 1760.
- St. Patrick Catholic Church (Fayetteville, NC), established-parish August 6, 1821, church August 11, 1821.

=== North Dakota ===
- First Presbyterian Church of Bismarck, oldest congregation, founded in 1873 (Presbyterian)
- Glencoe Presbyterian Church, oldest church building used by original congregation, built in 1885 (Presbyterian)
- First Congregation, Assumption Catholic Church in Pembina, 1818

=== Ohio ===
- Covenant-First Presbyterian Church, (Cincinnati, Ohio), organized October 16, 1790, is the oldest Presbyterian congregation west of the Allegheny Mountains.
- Holy Trinity Lutheran Church, North Canton Ohio Founded in 1806. Is one of the oldest congregations in the state of Ohio that is still meeting today. The church was also mentioned in an exhibit at the McKinley Presidential Museum in North Canton, Ohio as one of the oldest churches in the state.
- The Church in Aurora, The original church was Congregational, formed in 1809, shortly after Aurora was founded.
- West Union Presbyterian Church, oldest church building still in use as a church, built in 1810 (Presbyterian)
- First Church of the Resurrection founded in 1810 and was built in 1862 and still in use today (Non-Denominational)
- Brunswick United Methodist Church (Brunswick, OH), founded in 1817 and is the oldest church in Medina County and the second oldest in the Western Reserve. It is still in use today and was expanded in 2002.
- St. Paul's Episcopal Church, South Bass Island, oldest wooden church building still in use as a church, built in 1865 (Episcopal)
- St. Theodosius Russian Orthodox Cathedral, first Orthodox parish in Cleveland (organized in 1896)
- Hopewell Methodist Church in Rush Run, Ohio, oldest Methodist Church in Ohio (1803), site of the first Methodist sermon preached in the Northwest Territory (1787) and the first Methodist ordination in Ohio (1803)
- Nast Trinity United Methodist Church (Cincinnati, Ohio), built in 1881, it is the home of the first German Methodist church to be established anywhere in the world.
- Cortland Christian Church, Disciples of Christ was founded in 1828 with the current building built in 1853. It is the second-oldest DoC church in Ohio and the 4th oldest DoC congregation in the U.S.

=== Oklahoma ===
- Wheelock Church, oldest church building, built in 1846 (Presbyterian)
- Ottawa Indian Baptist Church founded in March 1840, built in Oklahoma in March 1860

=== Oregon ===
- St. Paul Catholic Church (St. Paul, Oregon), oldest church building, built in 1846 (Catholic)
- Oregon City United Methodist Church, oldest Protestant church, founded in 1844 (Methodist)

=== Pennsylvania ===
- Christ Church, Philadelphia, "The Nation's Church", founded 1695, a place of worship for the Founding Fathers and final resting place of five signers of the Declaration of Independence including Benjamin Franklin.
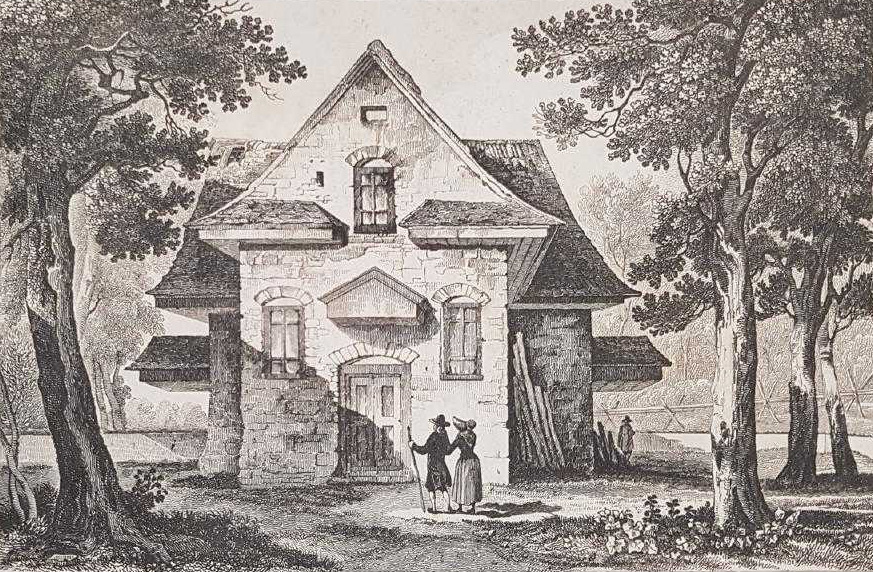
  The Merion Friends Meeting House was built in 1695, making it the second-oldest Friends meeting house in the United States
- Old Norriton Presbyterian Church, founded in 1678 as a Dutch Reformed Church. The existing church building was built in 1698.
- Germantown Mennonite Meeting House, Germantown Mennonite Church in Germantown, PA (1683).
- Merion Friends Meeting House, oldest church building in Pennsylvania (1695), Merion Station (Quaker).
- Brandywine Baptist Church, 2nd oldest Baptist Church in Pennsylvania (1692), Chadds Ford (Baptist).
- St. Thomas, Whitemarsh, founded in 1698. One of the 25 oldest churches in the US. Present church is the fourth building on the site.(Episcopal)
- St. Martin's Church, Marcus Hook, Pennsylvania (1699)
- Abington Friends Meeting House, Jenkintown, Pennsylvania (1699)
- New Hanover Lutheran Church near Gilbertsville, Pennsylvania, Founded about 1700.
- St. Peter's in the Great Valley, founded as an Anglican church about 1700. Construction of existing building started in 1744. Changed from Anglican to Episcopalian after the Revolutionary War.
- Gloria Dei (Old Swedes' Church), second oldest church building, built in 1700 (Lutheran/Episcopal)
- Upper Octorara Presbyterian Church, founded in 1720 and built by Arthur Park and his sons as well as other kinsmen near present-day Parkesburg. Present church has been having worship and service for 300 years, and has been serving the purpose of God in our generation.
- Middle Octorara Presbyterian Church, founded in 1727 by Arthur Park and other kinsmen. Its members built and worshipped in a log structure located in what is now our Old Cemetery. The present church building was constructed in about 1800 with bell towers and narthex being added in 1914. In 1953, construction began on a new educational building to replace the chapel previously used for Sunday School classes. This new building was expanded and modified over the years with a complete renovation taking place in 1999–2000.
- Old St. Joseph's Church, oldest Catholic congregation in Pennsylvania (1733)
- Beulah Presbyterian Church 2500 McCrady Road, Pittsburgh PA 15235, Since 1784
- St. George's United Methodist Church (Philadelphia), built in 1769, America's first and oldest continuously used Methodist church in the world.
- African Episcopal Church of St. Thomas, founded 1792, oldest black Episcopal congregation in the United States (Episcopal)
- Mother Bethel AME Church, oldest African Methodist Episcopal congregation, founded 1794 (African Methodist Episcopal)
- Old Trinity Church, one of the oldest churches in Philadelphia, erected 1711 (Episcopal)
- Christ Lutheran Church (York), built in 1743 (Lutheran).
- Enon Tabernacle Baptist Church (Philadelphia) – Founded in 1876 as a small group of church goers and built on land in Germantown on 230 W. Coulter Street off of Wayne Avenue.
- Central Moravian Church (Bethlehem) Chapel built in 1751 and the Sanctuary, completed in 1806.

=== Rhode Island ===
- First Baptist Church in America, oldest congregation in RI, founded in 1638 (building 1775) (Baptist).
- Newman Congregational Church was founded in 1643 (current building 1810) (United Church of Christ)
- Six Principle Baptist Church, one of the oldest Baptist church buildings in the U.S., built in 1703, (Baptist)
- Trinity Church, Newport, oldest Anglican congregation in RI, founded in 1698 (building 1726) (Episcopal).
- Great Friends Meeting House, oldest church building in RI, built in 1699 (Quaker).
- Old Narragansett Church, Wickford, oldest Episcopal church building in New England (1707).
- Portsmouth Friends Meeting House, Portsmouth, building dates from the 1690s.
- First Congregational Church, Bristol Bristol first and founding church since 1680.
- Kingston Congregational Church, Kingston founded in 1695, history on KingCongChurch.org (current building 1820 -United Church of Christ)

=== South Carolina ===
- St. Philip's Episcopal Church (Charleston, South Carolina), oldest Episcopal congregation south of Virginia, founded 1681 (Anglican)
- First Baptist Church (Charleston, South Carolina), oldest Baptist congregation in the South, founded in 1682 (Baptist)
- Presbyterian Church on Edisto - 1685
- Old St. Andrew's Parish Church, Charleston, South Carolina, oldest church building south of Virginia, built in 1706 (Anglican)
- Parish Church of St. Helena, Beaufort, South Carolina, founded 1712, built 1724 (Anglican)
- Zion Lutheran Church (Lexington County, South Carolina), oldest church congregation in interior S. C. above the fall line, founded 1745.
- Silver Bluff Baptist Church, oldest black Baptist congregation in the nation, founded 1774-1775 (Baptist)
- St. James Church (Goose Creek, South Carolina), built in 1719 (Anglican)
- Friendship Baptist Church (Pauline, South Carolina) Founded in 1765. Oldest Baptist church in the Upstate.
- Congaree Baptist Church (Gadsden, South Carolina) Founded in 1765. Present church building constructed around 1810.
- Bush River Baptist Church (Newberry, South Carolina. Founded in October 1771. Present church building constructed in 1917.
- St. Mary's Catholic Church (Charleston, South Carolina) Founded in 1789 as the first Catholic Church in the Carolinas and Georgia.
- Millway Baptist Church (Bradley, South Carolina), founded in 1811 (Baptist)
- First Baptist Church (Sumter, South Carolina) Church building built in 1820.

=== South Dakota ===
- Renner Lutheran Church, oldest operating church building, built in 1878 (Lutheran)

=== Tennessee ===
- Sinking Creek Baptist Church, oldest church building, oldest congregation and building, founded in 1772 (Baptist)
- St. Michael Catholic Church, the oldest continuously operational Catholic church in Tennessee. Founded in 1842 by John Dillon Byrne, Henry Redmond, Levi Traughber, and Joseph Watson.
- Beech Cumberland Presbyterian Church, the oldest church in Middle Tennessee, Founded in 1798 by Thomas Craighead. The Cumberland Presbyterian Church, founded in 1810, constituted its first Synod there on October 5. 1813.
- Suggs Creek Cumberland Presbyterian, First Confession of Faith of the Cumberland Presbyterian Church was adopted in 1814, Suggs Creek church founded in 1800 (Cumberland Presbyterian)
- Double Springs Baptist Church (Sullivan County), Founded in 1786 by Jonathan Mulkey
- First Presbyterian Church (Greeneville, Tennessee), oldest congregation in Greene County, founded in 1780 by Rev. Samuel Doak
- St. John's Cathedral (Knoxville, Tennessee) Established in 1826 (35 years after the founding of Knoxville). In May 1844, with 25 communicants, St. John's became the first mission from Eastern Tennessee to be admitted to the Diocese of Tennessee.

=== Texas ===
- Cathedral of San Fernando, possibly oldest church building, built 1738-1750 (Catholic)
- McMahan Chapel in St. Augustine, the oldest Protestant church congregation in Texas, founded in 1833 (Methodist)
- Old Pilgrim Two Seed-in-the-Spirit Church, oldest Baptist Church in Texas, founded in 1834 (Baptist)
- San Felipe United Methodist Church, the oldest Protestant church building in Texas, built in 1838 (Methodist)
- Socorro Mission, possibly the oldest continuous congregation, founded in 1682, rebuilt 1840 (Catholic)
- Ysleta Mission, possibly the oldest continuous congregation, founded in 1682 (Catholic)
- Our Lady of Loreto Chapel, at the Presidio La Bahia, Goliad, founded in 1779 (Catholic)
- First Presbyterian Church at San Antonio, the first Protestant church in San Antonio, founded in 1846 (Presbyterian)
- First Montgomery Baptist Church in Montgomery, Texas, founded in 1850 (Baptist)
- Chinn Chapel United Methodist Church in Copper Canyon, founded in 1877 (Methodist)

=== United States Virgin Islands ===
- Frederick Lutheran Church, of Charlotte Amalie, St. Thomas, built in 1666. It is the oldest continuous Lutheran church in the western hemisphere (Lutheran - ELCA)
- Lord God of Sabaoth Lutheran Church, of Christiansted, St. Croix, began worshipping in 1734 and the building built in 1750 (Lutheran - ELCA)

=== Utah ===
- Bountiful Tabernacle, oldest Mormon Tabernacle, built in 1857 (Mormon)
- Pine Valley Chapel, oldest Mormon meetinghouse in continuous use, built in 1868 (Mormon)
- First Congregational Church, Salt Lake City, first non-LDS church in the state, 1865 (Congregational)
- St. Mark's Cathedral, Salt Lake City, oldest non-LDS Church building in continual use, built in 1871 (Episcopal)

=== Vermont ===
- First Congregational Church of Bennington, oldest congregation, founded in 1762 (Congregational)
- St. James' Episcopal Church (Arlington, Vermont), oldest Anglican/Episcopal congregation founded in 1764 (Episcopalian)
- Rockingham Meeting House, one of the two oldest church buildings, built in 1787 (Congregational)
- Thetford Meeting House, Thetford Hill, one of the two oldest church buildings, built in 1787 (Congregational)

=== Virginia ===
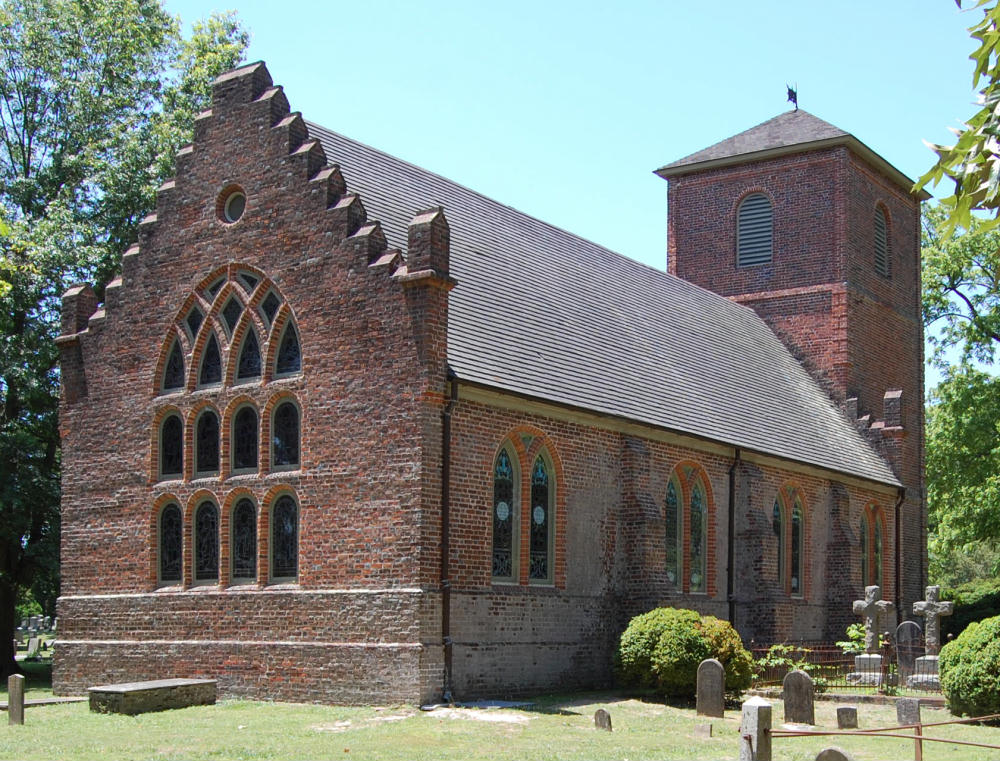
St. Luke's Church, ca. 1680s, is the oldest extant church building in Virginia

- St. John's Episcopal Church (Hampton, Virginia), oldest English-speaking parish in continuous existence in the United States of America, founded in 1610 (Episcopal)
- St. Luke's Church, oldest surviving church building in Virginia, built 1685–1686; this date, however, is controversial. Local oral history dates the building as 1632. National Historic Landmark. (Anglican Circa 1685–1804, Episcopal Circa 1804–1836, Historic Church Museum 1953–present).
- St. Peter's Church (New Kent, Virginia), The Episcopal parish was established in 1679, the current brick building was begun in 1701. Services were first held in the building by 1703. The "stump" tower was added by 1740 to house a bell and provide a meeting place for the Vestry,
- Bruton Parish Church (Williamsburg, Virginia), established in 1674 by the consolidation of two previous parishes in the Virginia Colony. The church remains an active Episcopal parish. The building was constructed 1711-15 and was designated a National Historic Landmark.
- Slash Church or Slash Christian Church (Disciples of Christ), oldest wooden frame church building in Virginia, built in 1729
- The Falls Church, The Episcopal parish was established in 1732 and the brick meeting house preserved on site dates to 1769
- Augusta Stone Church, (Presbyterian), oldest Presbyterian church in Virginia. The wood meeting house was built in 1740, and was replaced with the current stone church (still in use) in 1749. The stone church was used as both sanctuary and a repose from Indian attacks. It is listed in the Augusta County Historical Register.
- Sinking Spring Presbyterian Church (Abingdon, Virginia), organized in 1772 and was founded by Rev. Charles Cummings
- First Baptist Church (Petersburg, Virginia), contends as the oldest organized black Baptist congregation, organized 1774 (Baptist)
- Nimmo United Methodist Church (Virginia Beach, Virginia), founded in 1791 while George Washington was president. The church is the oldest Methodist church in continuous use.
- Kempsville Baptist Church (Virginia Beach, Virginia), Established with the Baptist Association on May 21, 1814
- Old Chapel (Clarke County, Virginia) Oldest Episcopal church still in use west of the Blue Ridge Mountains; current building built 1790
- St. John's Church (Richmond, Virginia), oldest wooden church building, built 1741
- Jerusalem Christian Church (1791), King William Virginia, oldest congregation affiliated with the Christian Churches and churches of Christ. It was once affiliated with the Disciples of Christ.
- Old Chapel Church also known locally as the "Snow Creek Chapel", was built in 1769 as a chapel of ease for the Church of England parish in what is today Penhook, Virginia. One of the oldest churches in the southwestern portion of the state.
- Independence United Methodist Church, (1783), Emporia Virginia. Originally was Independence Methodist church until many of the Methodist churches joined with the Evangelical United Brethren Church in 1968.

=== Washington ===
- Claquato Church, the oldest church in Washington State. Built in 1857. Originally housed a Methodist Episcopal congregation.
- Tumwater Methodist Church, 219 W. B Street in Tumwater, Washington. Built in 1872 and added to the National Register in 1984. Currently houses St. James Anglican Church.
- St. Luke's Episcopal Church, oldest Episcopal congregation, continuously from 1860

=== Washington, D.C. ===
- St. Paul's Episcopal Church, Rock Creek Parish (Washington, D.C.), oldest congregation and oldest church building, founded in 1717, current building constructed in 1775, but incorporating parts of the 1717 structure (Episcopal)

=== West Virginia ===
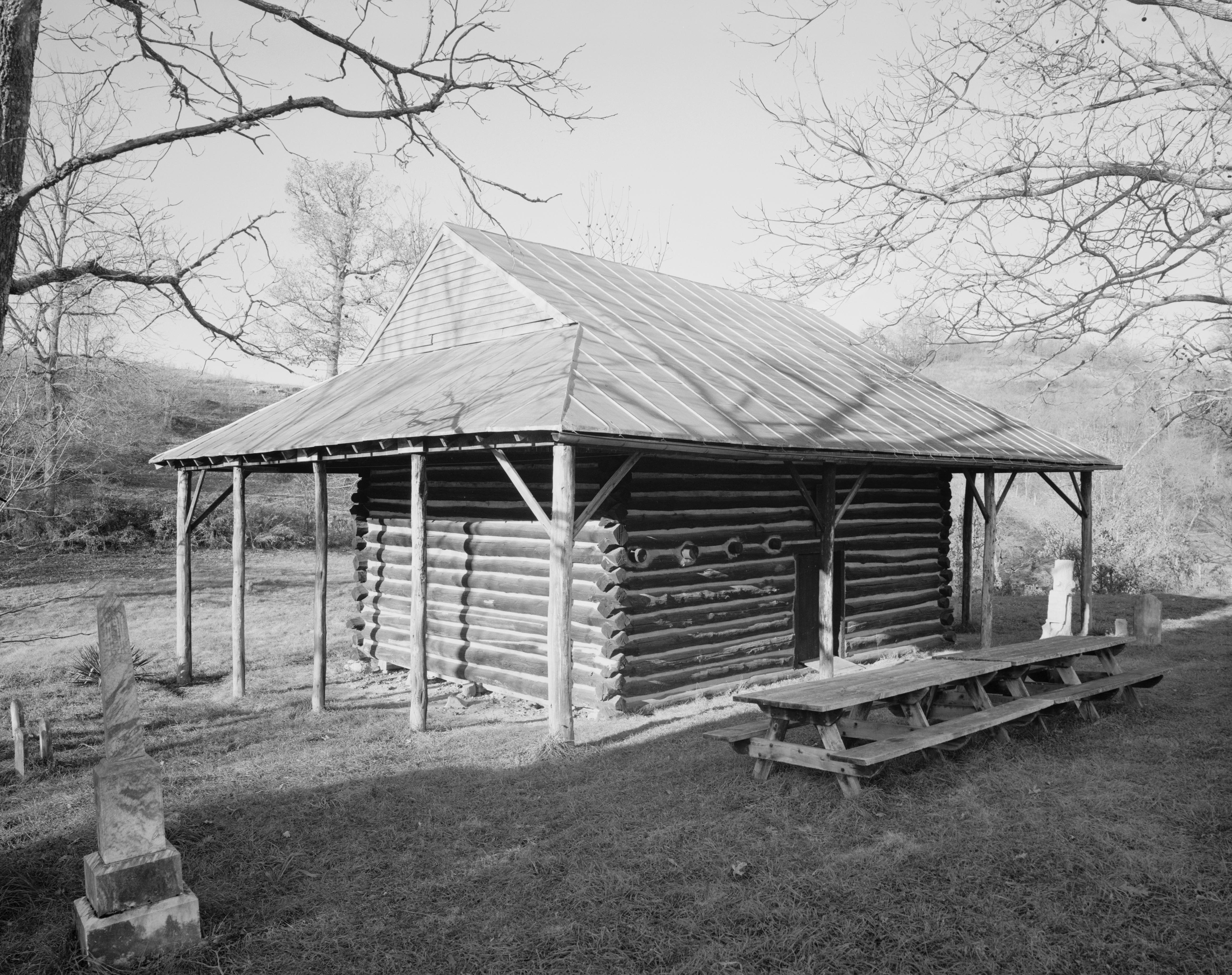
Rehoboth Church was constructed in 1786

- Rehoboth Church, built in 1785 (Methodist), oldest church building west of the main range of the Allegheny Mountains.
- Tuscarora Presbyterian Church, oldest congregation and oldest church building, founded in 1740, central building constructed by 1745.

=== Wisconsin ===
- Methodist Episcopal Church in Mineral Point, oldest Protestant congregation in Wisconsin, founded in 1834 (Methodist)
- St. Gabriel's Church in Prairie Du Chien, oldest church building built in Wisconsin, built in 1835 (Catholic)
- St. Joan of Arc Chapel, oldest church building in Wisconsin, built in 15th century Chasse, France; moved to Milwaukee in 1965 (Catholic).

=== Wyoming ===
- First United Methodist Church (Cheyenne, Wyoming), possibly the oldest church congregation, founded in 1869 (Methodist)
- Rock Church (Auburn, Wyoming), built in 1889, an LDS church is one the oldest church buildings in WY

== See also ==
- Oldest buildings in the United States
- Oldest synagogues in the United States
- List of oldest buildings in the Americas
- List of the oldest churches in Mexico
- Oldest churches in the world
