= Fairfield Presbyterian Church =

Historic church in New Jersey, United States

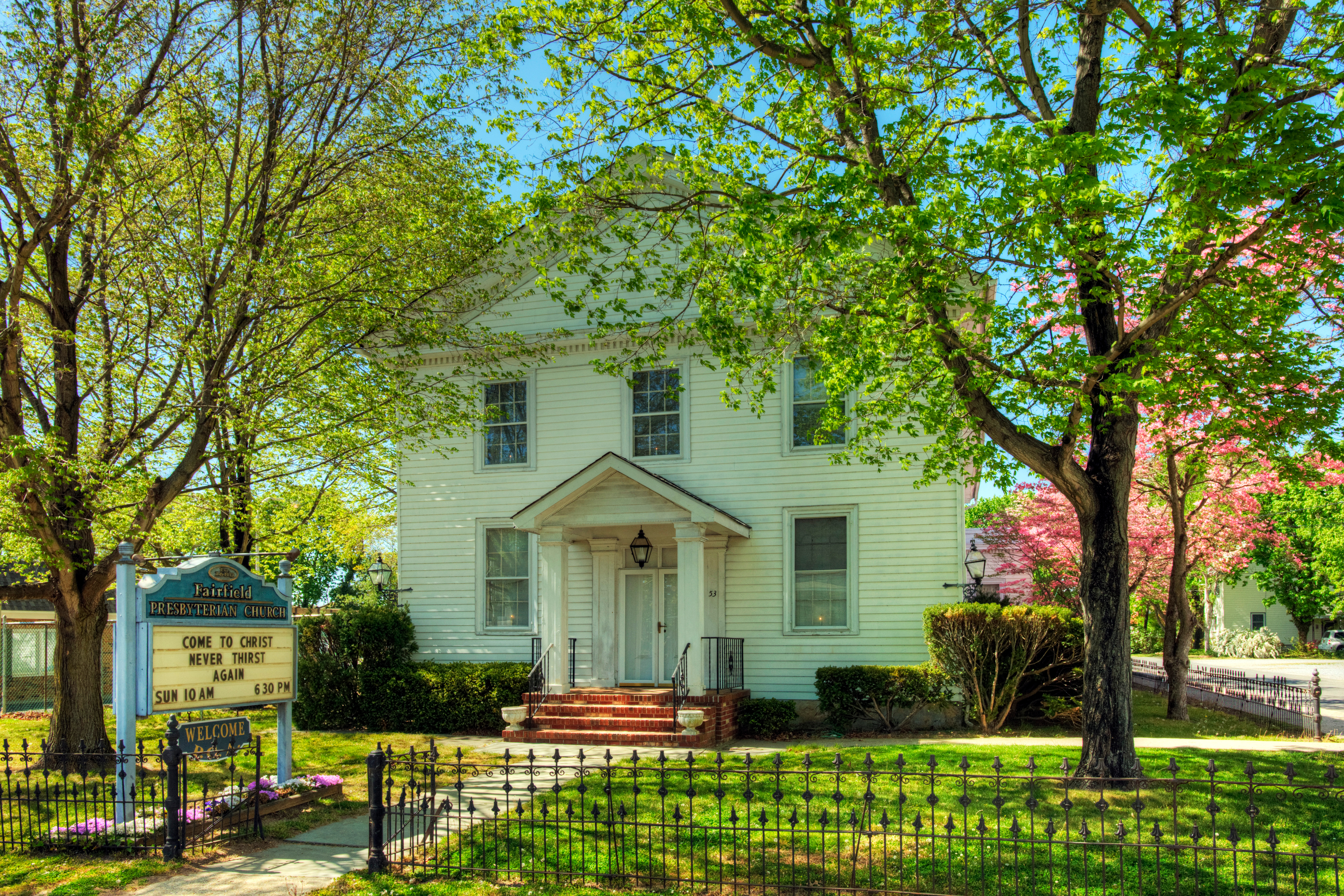
- The fourth and current building (1850), a mile and a half north of The Old Stone Church (1780)

- Location within Cumberland County, New Jersey
- 39°22′52.8″N 75°13′16.2″W
- Location: 53 Main Street Church Lane, Fairton, New Jersey
- Country: United States
- Denomination: Presbyterian Church in America
- Previous denomination: United Presbyterian Church in the United States of America
- Churchmanship: Evangelical, Reformed
- Website: fairfieldpca.org

History
- Founded: 1680

Architecture
- Completed: 1850 (existing church), 1780 (Old Stone Church)

Clergy
- Pastor: Pastor Chris O'Brien
- The Old Stone Church
- U.S. National Register of Historic Places
- New Jersey Register of Historic Places
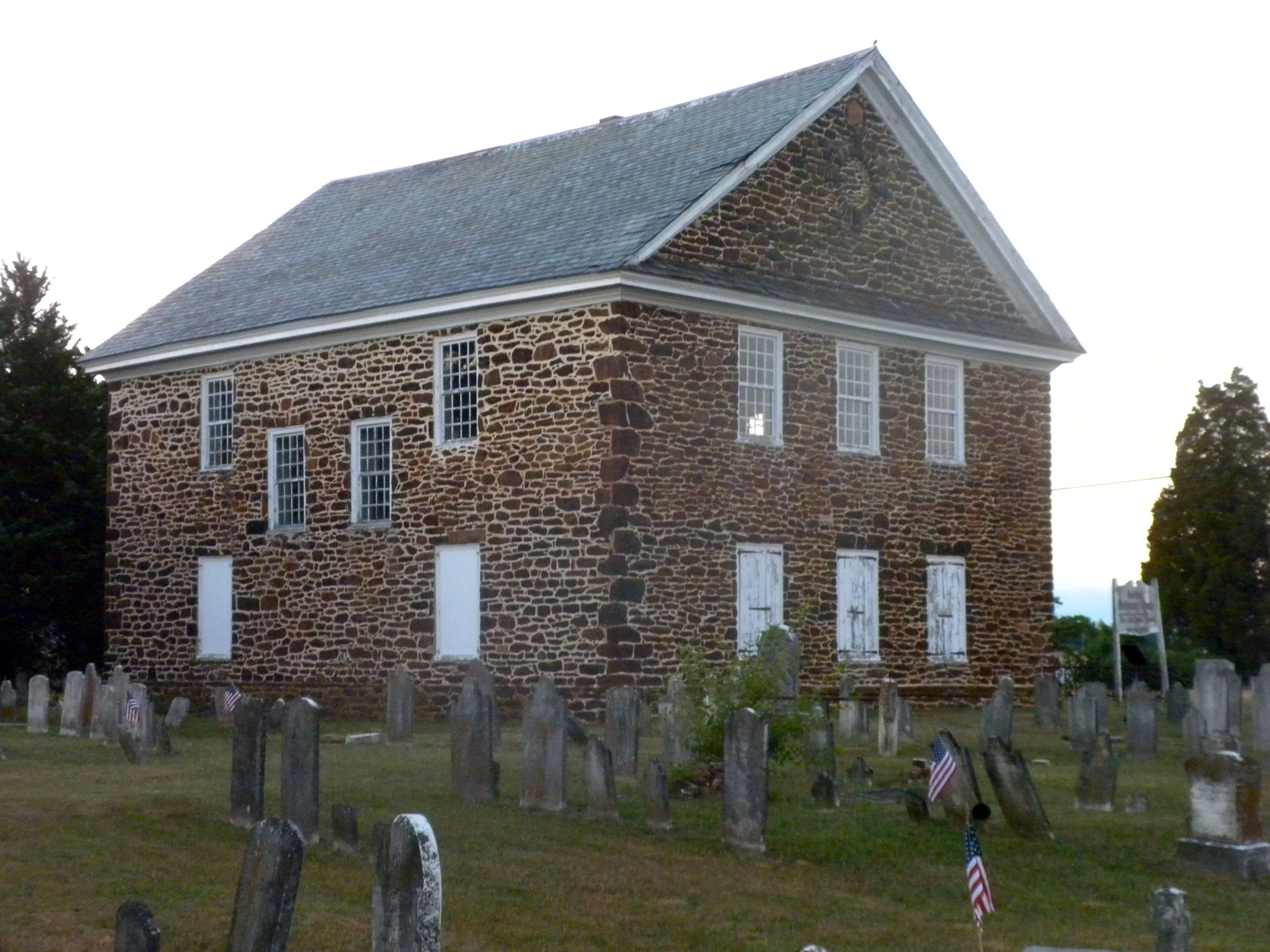
- Built: 1780
- Architectural style: Georgian, Builder Georgian
- NRHP reference No.: 77000860
- NJRHP No.: 1042

Significant dates
- Added to NRHP: May 12, 1977
- Designated NJRHP: May 8, 1973

Fairfield Presbyterian Church is a historic Presbyterian Church in America congregation in the Fairton section of Fairfield Township in Cumberland County, New Jersey. It was founded in 1680 when a log church was built on the banks of the Cohansey Creek, and it is the oldest existing congregation within the PCA, which it joined in 1980 after leaving the UPCUSA in 1971. The log church was replaced by a New England–style frame building sometime between 1713 and 1715. In 1780, the Old Stone Church was built, which still exists a mile and half to the south of Fairton, and north of Cedarville, on County Route 553. The stone church was in use until 1850, when the present building in Fairton was completed. It was documented by the Historic American Buildings Survey in 1936. The Old Stone Church has been preserved and was added to the National Register of Historic Places on May 12, 1977, for its architectural significance. In 2006 the church celebrated its 325th anniversary. The church subscribes to the Westminster Confession of Faith. The senior pastor Rev. Chris O'Brien, has served the congregation since 2022.

== Pastors ==
- M. Bradnor (1680–1695)
- Thomas Bridges (1695–1702)
- Joseph Smith (1709–1711)
- Samuel Exell (1712–1712)
- Howell A.P. Howell (1715–1717)
- Henry Hook (1718–1722)
- Noyes Parris (1724–1729)
- Daniel Elmer (1729–1755)
- William Ramsey (1756–1771)
- William Hollingshead (1773–1783)
- Ethan Osborn (1789–1844) (Note: The longest serving pastor at 55 years.)
- David McKee (1836–1838)
- Beriah B. Hotchckin (1845–1850)
- David C. Meeker (1851–1855)
- James Boggs (1857–1866)
- Hiram E. Johnson (1866–1869)
- Samuel R. Jones (1869–1874)
- Samuel R. Anderson (1875–1883)
- Henry Reeves (1883–1885)
- Frank R. Symmes (1886–1890)
- Thomas W. Pulham (1891–1893)
- George Warrington (1894–1897)
- J.N. Wagenhurst (1897–1900)
- John Bamford (1901–1903)
- W.J. Trimble (1903–1906)
- William Bullock (1907–1908)
- Nelson B. Kline (1909–1910)
- William M. Seel (1912–1914)
- Franklin Weatherwax (1914–1917)
- Nelson B. Kline (1918–1922)
- Jacob Dyke (1922–1923)
- J. Howard Douglas (1923–1928)
- Clinton Cook (1929–1941)
- Arthur Haverly (1942–1945)
- John Taxis (1945–1947)
- Paul Stauning (1947–1951)
- Ralph Tamaccio (1951–1954)
- Lincoln Griswold (1955–1958)
- Allen Ackley (1960–1964)
- Vaughn Thurman (1965–1967)
- Charles Dennison (1972–1976)
- Lawrence C. Roff (1977–1984)
- Allan Story (1985–1992)
- Michael Schuelke (1992–2022)
- Chris O'Brien (since 2022)

Source: "Fairfield Presbyterian Church (PCA)". Fairfield Presbyterian Church.

== See also ==
- National Register of Historic Places listings in Cumberland County, New Jersey
- Old Broad Street Presbyterian Church and Cemetery
- List of the oldest churches in the United_States

== Bibliography ==
- The Fairfield Presbyterian Church Manuscript Collection. Princeton Theological Seminary Library. 1996.
