= Church of the Holy Family (Cahokia Heights, Illinois) =

Historic church in Illinois, United States

- U.S. National Register of Historic Places
- U.S. National Historic Landmark
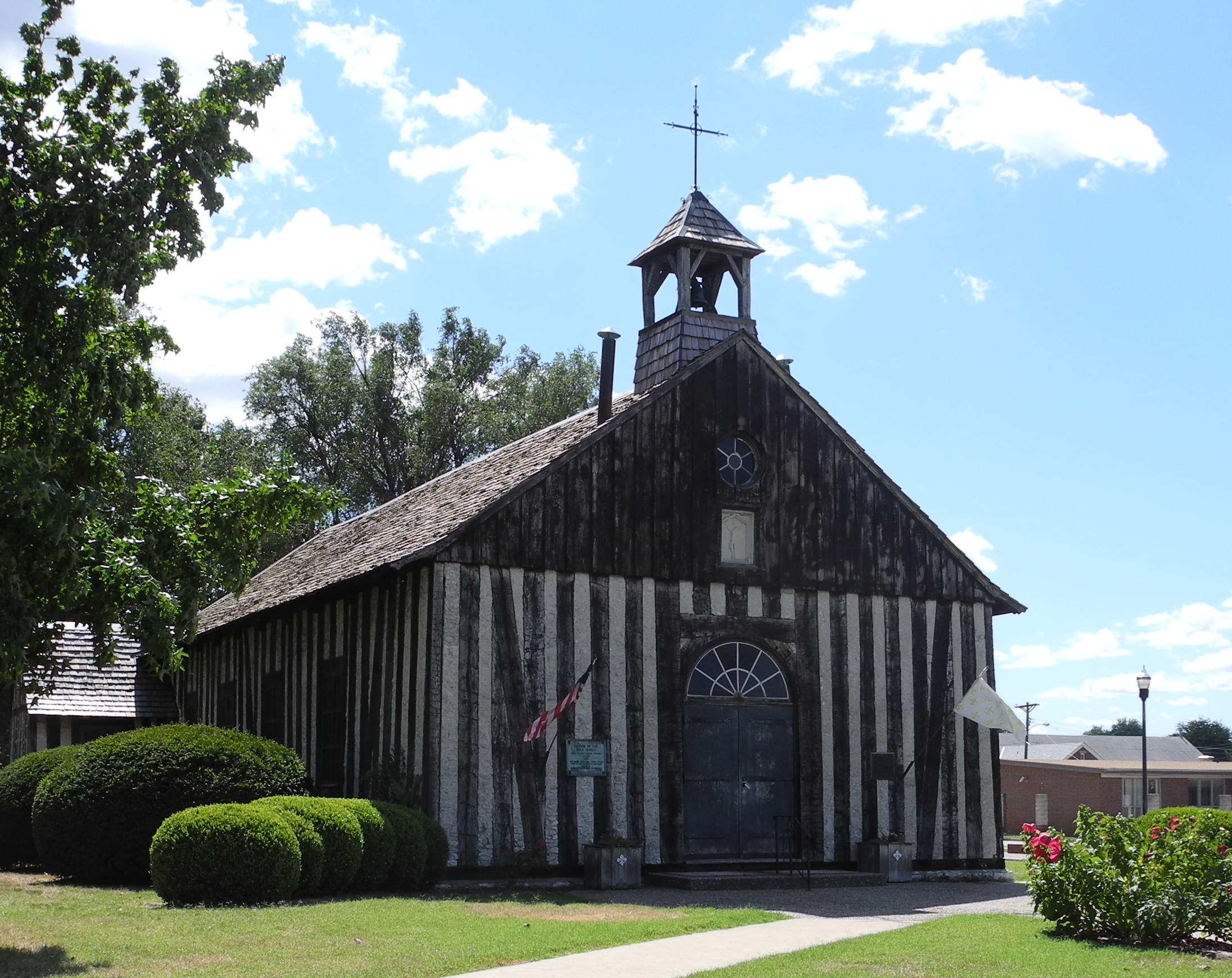

- Location within Illinois Location within the United States
- Location: 116 Church St. (corner East 1st St.), Cahokia Heights, Illinois
- Coordinates: 38°34′12″N 90°11′19″W
- Area: 3.6 acres (1.5 ha)
- Built: 1786–1799
- NRHP reference No.: 70000851

Significant dates
- Added to NRHP: April 15, 1970
- Designated NHL: April 15, 1970

The Church of the Holy Family (French: Église de la Sainte-Famille) is a Catholic parish located at 116 Church Street in Cahokia Heights, Illinois. The congregation is said to be the oldest continuously active Catholic parish in the United States, having been founded in 1699 by Canadian missionaries, and is the oldest church building west of the Allegheny Mountains.

== History ==
Built in 1786, it is a remarkably unaltered example of the French colonial construction style known as poteaux-sur-sol ("post-on-sill") and one of the few such surviving buildings in North America.

The congregation was established in 1699, when Jesuit priests from Quebec (New France) arrived with Fr François Pinet to establish a mission. The mission was ended about 1768, and the fate of its building is not known. In 1783, Cahokia was integrated from Province of Quebec to the United States. Construction of this church began about 1786, not long after the arrival of Fr Paul St. Pierre, and was formally consecrated on September 24, 1799. It remained in use by the congregation for worship until 1891, when a new stone church was built adjacent. The log church was then converted into a parish hall, a role it played until its restoration in 1949–51.

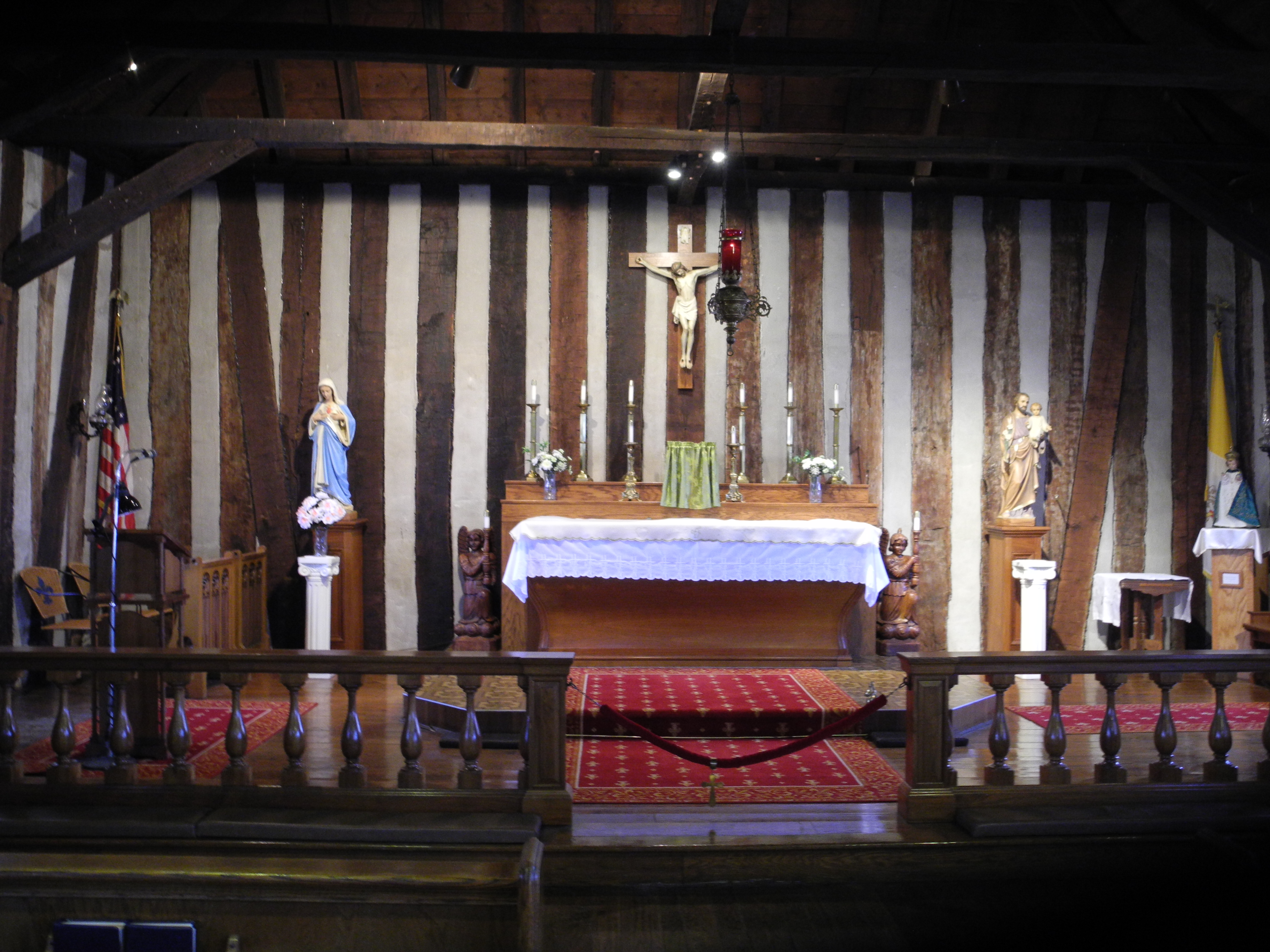
The church interior

The Church of the Holy Family stands in central Cahokia Heights, at the southeast corner of East 1st and Church Streets. The church campus includes three buildings: the 1799 church, a modern 20th-century sanctuary, and a parish house. The 1799 church is a log structure, measuring about 32 by 74 feet (9.8 m × 22.6 m). It is built out of heavy walnut timbers that were hewn into rectangular shape and mortised into a wooden sill resting on stone slabs. The timbers are each about 14 feet (4.3 m) long, one foot wide and six inches thick, and are set about one foot apart. The spaces between them are filled with what was termed pierrotage, a mixture of rubblestone and clay. Each of the walls slopes slightly inward as it rises, and is braced by diagonal timbers. The roof trusses are of walnut and oak, and give the roof a bell-cast appearance.

The occupying congregation is said to be the oldest continuously active Catholic parish in the United States, having been founded in 1699 by Canadian missionaries, and is the oldest church west of the Allegheny Mountains.

The only substantive alterations to the building have been relatively minor. Small wings were added in 1833, and in the 1890s the exterior was finished in wooden clapboards; the clapboards have since been removed. In 1949–1951 the structure's foundation underwent repairs, and some of its rotted members were replaced.

It was declared a National Historic Landmark and added to the National Register of Historic Places in 1970. At the invitation of then-Bishop Edward Braxton of Belleville, the Institute of Christ the King Sovereign Priest has for years offered Mass in the historic church according to the Missal of 1962.

Visitors are welcome for guided tours in the summer. In celebration of the 2018 Illinois Bicentennial, Holy Family Church was selected as one of the Illinois 200 Great Places by the American Institute of Architects Illinois chapter.

== See also ==
- List of the oldest churches in the United States
- National Register of Historic Places listings in St. Clair County, Illinois
