= First Church of Windsor =

Coordinates: 41°51′27.91″N 72°38′17.91″W

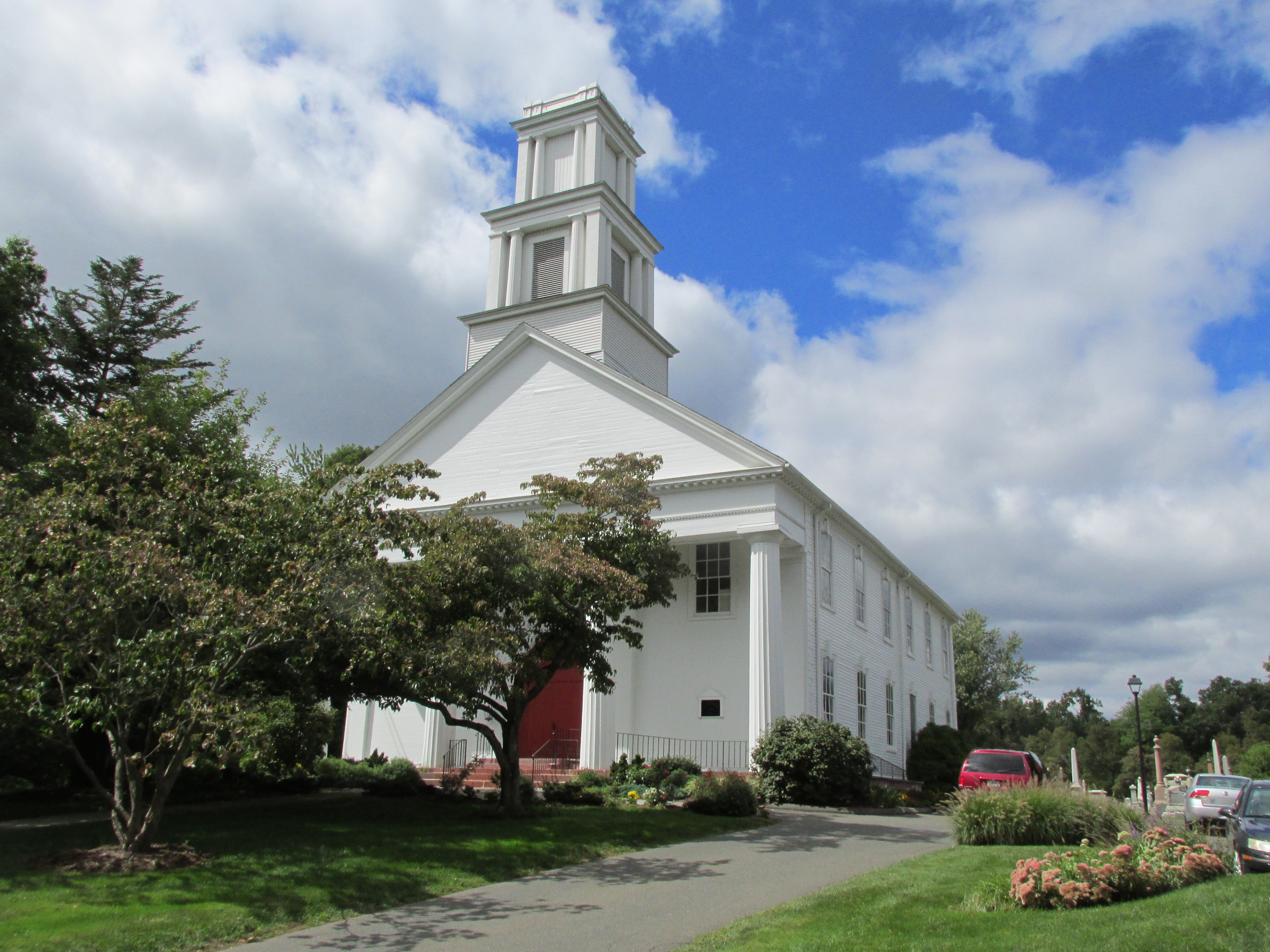
The First Church in Windsor

The First Church in Windsor, Connecticut is the oldest Congregational church in Connecticut. Its origin can be traced back to 1630, when 140 men and women sailed out of Plymouth, England on the Mary & John. This was the first of 17 ships in the so-called Winthrop Fleet, bound for the Massachusetts Bay Colony. When they heard from the Indians about the fertile land along the Connecticut River in what is now called the Connecticut River Valley, a small contingent of settlers travelled southwest and established the first settlement in Connecticut at Windsor in 1633. Word soon spread that Windsor was a good place in which to settle: in 1635, the congregation of the First Church departed from their homes in Dorchester, Massachusetts to relocate to Connecticut.

== History ==
The first settler who arrived in Windsor was William Holmes and his crew from Plymouth in 1633 who built the first trading house. A different group representing Dorchester, Massachusetts came to explore the settlement in 1634. Under the leadership of Reverend John Warham many colonists from Dorchester finally came to settle in Windsor originally naming it Dorchester. Warham led the first congregation for many years and owned the first gristmill in Connecticut. Warham was described as "the principal pillar and father of the colony" by Cotton Mather.

The original site of the First Church of Windsor was a meetinghouse built under the direction of Ephraim Huit, a town leader and teacher now buried in the Palisado Cemetery. The building stood at the center of the Palisado Green and was enclosed in a stockade (palisado) for protection against the indigenous people, wolves and other intruders. The church was covered by a thatched roof with a cupola in the center. Later, a platform was added to the cupola, as a place for beating drums to notify nearby residents of Sunday services and to warn them of imminent attacks. The Church functioned as the political and religious center of the early town.

Windsor was the first location in the New World where suspected witches were accused for witchcraft. The Church was probably involved in condemning these women. The accused witches Alice "Alse' Young in 1647 and Lydia Gilbert in 1654 were sent to Hartford for their trials and subsequent executions by hanging. This began the trend of witch-hunting in New England that culminated in the infamous Salem witch trials. In the winter of 2017, The First Church of Windsor officially apologized for their participation in past condemnation of Alice Young and Lydia Gilbert and supported a resolution by Windsor Town Council to acknowledge these victims and symbolically clear their names within the town of Windsor.

Around 1668, a schism in the church resulted in the formation of a Presbyterian Party of Windsor. This group ordained their first minister in 1669 and held services in the town house; the First Church, meanwhile, continued as Congregationalist and occupied the meetinghouse. Several attempts at reconciliation occurred during the next 10 years; however, it appears that the congregation of the First Church would only readmit former members of the congregation if they surrendered unconditionally. Eventually, reconciliation was accomplished by Samuel Mather, the cousin of Cotton Mather. Stiles’ History of Ancient Windsor records that, during Mr. Mather’s ministry (1684-1728) “not a shadow of complaint seemed to have darkened his or their pathways", suggesting that this reconciliation was received peacefully by the local community.

By 1711, a separate ecclesiastical society had been established in every town in Connecticut, including the First Church in Windsor. Near the end of the 18th Century, responsibility for the local cemeteries and for public education was transferred to the newly organized First School Society. In time, education fell under the control of the community government in Windsor; however, the First School Society still carries out the administration for the Palisado and Riverside cemeteries.

The location of the meetinghouse near the convergence of the Connecticut River and the Farmington River created challenges when members of the congregation tried to attend services during flooding. Additionally, when a fire destroyed the meetinghouse in 1754, the parishioners decided to build two meetinghouses, one on each side of the river. The Rev. William Russell, and later the Rev. David Rowland, ministered to the First Ecclesiastical Society on the south side of the river, and the Rev. Theodore Hinsdale ministered to the parishioners on the north side. Two years later, the present meetinghouse was built on the north side of the river; in addition, a covered bridge was built across the river to allow parishioners from the south side to attend easily. Shortly afterwards, the school was built on the south side of the river.

Major changes in the meetinghouse were undertaken in 1844, 50 years after its construction. A Greek-Revival portico was built, replacing the tower with its tall steeple; in addition, the box pews were removed and replaced with the "slips” found today. The high pulpit and stairs were removed and the present pulpit installed. A Sunday School room was built at the rear of the meetinghouse in 1890; this now serves as a space for the church choirs to rehearse.

In the 1950s, Windsor experienced major population growth. The First Church acquired additional property in 1953 (the adjacent Pierson and Russell houses) and in 1955 broke ground for the construction of a new Parish House. In 1961, the First Church voted to become a member congregation of the recently formed United Church of Christ, a 1957 merger of the Congregational and Evangelical & Reformed churches.

Currently, a Long-Range Planning Committee is discussing how the spiritual mission of the church relates to worship, music, youth and the attraction of new members.

== Notable members ==
Notable members over the years include Oliver Ellsworth (1745-1807), the third chief justice of the U.S. Supreme Court. He served as a senator in the newly formed Congress (1789-1796). Ellsworth is primarily remembered for his contribution to the formation of the U.S. Constitution and for drafting the Judiciary Act of 1789, which laid the foundations for a strong federal judiciary system and created the U.S. Supreme Court. Ellsworth is buried at Old Cemetery, now known as Palisado Cemetery, behind the First Church.

Another notable member was Joseph H. Rainey (1832-1877), the first African American person to serve in the United States House of Representatives and the second African American person to serve in the United States Congress. The Rainey family was active in the First Church of Windsor, and in 1876 Rainey gave a speech at the town's observance of the American Centennial celebration.

== See also ==
- Oldest churches in the United States
