= First United Methodist Church (Cheyenne, Wyoming) =

Historic church in Wyoming, United States

- U.S. National Register of Historic Places
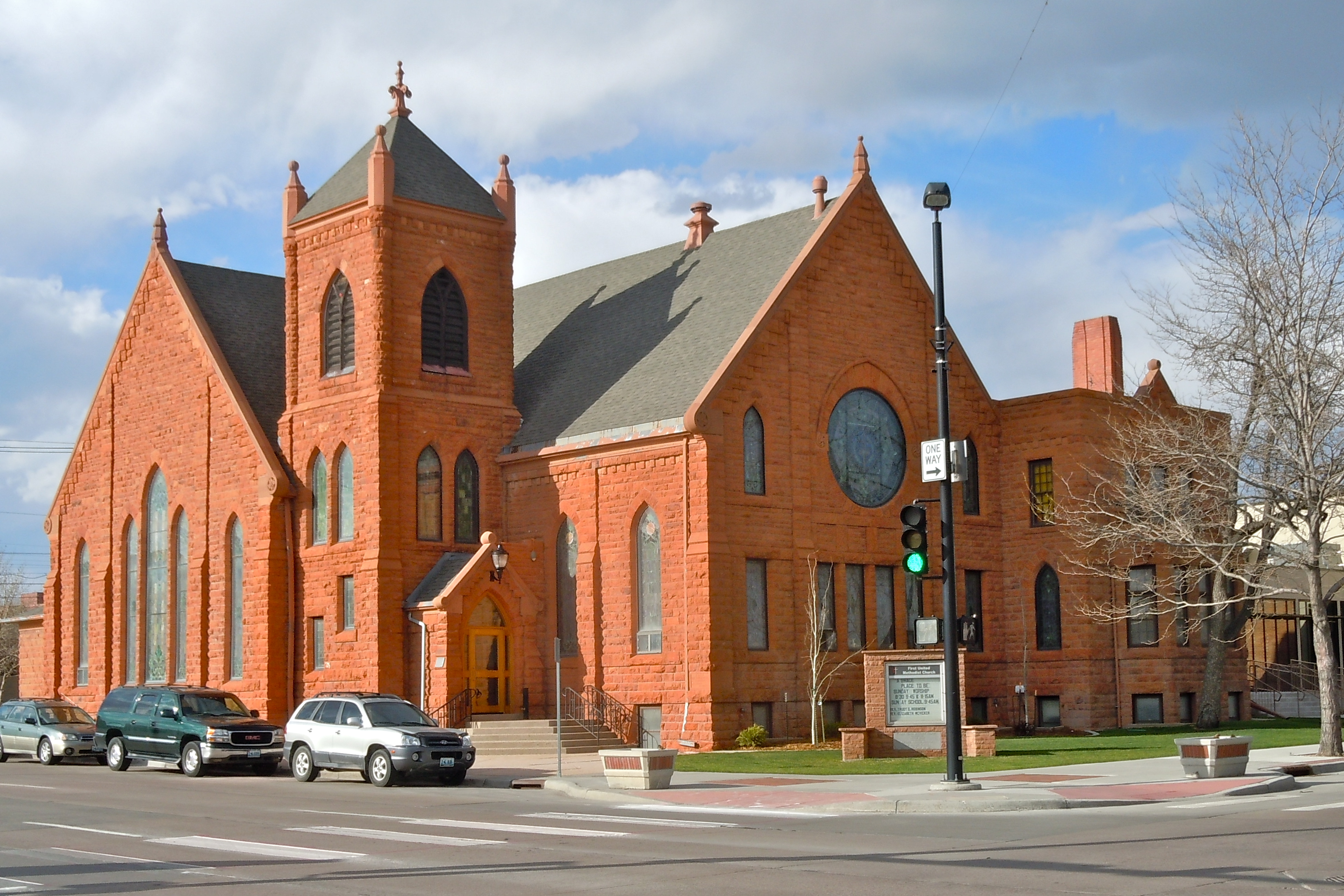
- First United Methodist Church, Cheyenne

- Location within Wyoming Location within the United States
- Location: NE corner of 18th St. and Central Ave., Cheyenne, Wyoming, USA
- Coordinates: 41°8′7″N 104°48′53″W
- Area: less than one acre
- Built: 1890
- Architect: Julien, J.P.; Keefe, M.P.
- Architectural style: Semi-Gothic
- NRHP reference No.: 75001902
- Added to NRHP: February 25, 1975

First United Methodist Church (also known as First Methodist Church) is a historic Methodist church building at the northeast corner of 18th Street and Central Avenue in Cheyenne, Wyoming, United States.

The congregation was founded in 1867. The church building at 18th and Central was constructed in 1890 and added to the National Register of Historic Places in 1975.

== History ==
The Reverend W. W. Baldwin, a circuit rider from Colorado, led the first Methodist church services in Cheyenne on September 29, 1867 in City Hall. Three months later the Union Pacific railroad tracks reached the new town. The Methodist Society was soon formed with nine members and a local physician, Dr. D. W. Scott, acted as the first minister. The Reverend A. Gather arrived in 1868.

Two years later the Society bought two lots at 18th and Central Avenues from the Union Pacific for $1.00 and lumber for a white frame church was ordered from Chicago. The church was dedicated by Bishop Ames on September 23, 1871. In 1874 Black members withdrew from the congregation and built an African Methodist Episcopal Church four blocks west.

Construction on the current church, made out of red sandstone, began in 1890 and the church was dedicated on Easter Sunday, 1894. It had 55 members at the time.

While the new church was being built on the original lots, the old frame church was moved into the middle of Central Avenue with services being held in the building for the next two-and-one-half years.

On March 5, 1876, the Methodist minister Reverend Warren married Wild Bill Hickok and Agnes Thatcher Lake, a 50-year-old circus proprietor at a nearby residence. Five months later Wild Bill was shot dead in Deadwood, South Dakota.

== Architecture ==
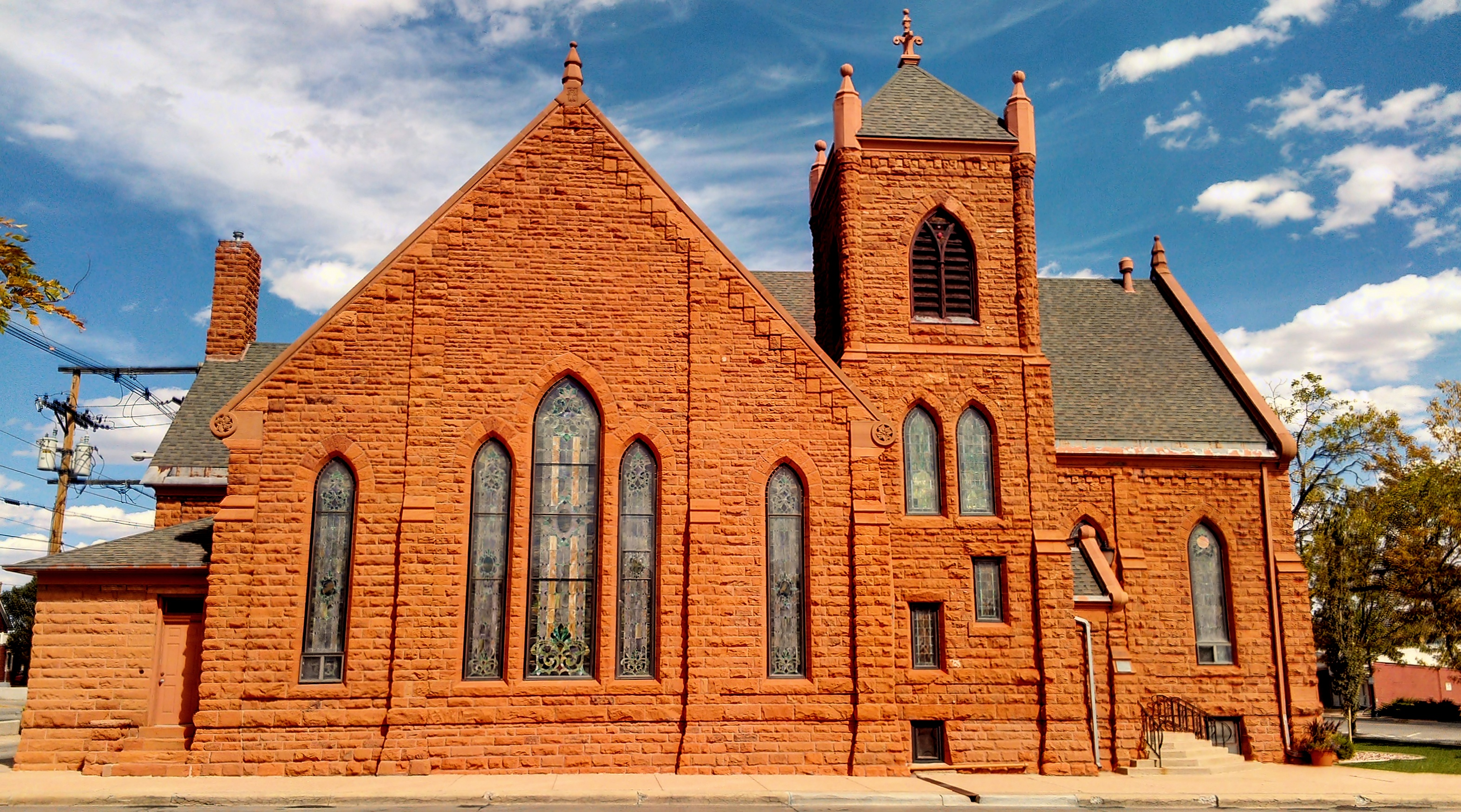
First United Methodist Church

Architect J. P. Julien designed the new church which was built by Moses Patrick Keefe for $25,000. Furnishings cost an additional $5,000. The two-story semi-Gothic church is constructed of Wyoming red sandstone with a steeply pitched roof and a three-story tower with a pyramidal roof and four small turrets.

As originally built the church measured approximately 91 feet in length by 55 feet and held 750 worshipers. In 1928, an addition to the rear extended the length to 126 feet. The width was extended to the east in 1950 to a total width of 60.4 feet. Twenty-seven stained glass windows were added around 1900.

== See also ==
- List of the oldest churches in the United States
