= St. Paul's Episcopal Church, Rock Creek Parish (Washington, D.C.) =

Historic church in Washington, D.C., United States

Coordinates: 38.9444°N 77.0114°W

- St. Paul's Episcopal Church
- U.S. National Register of Historic Places
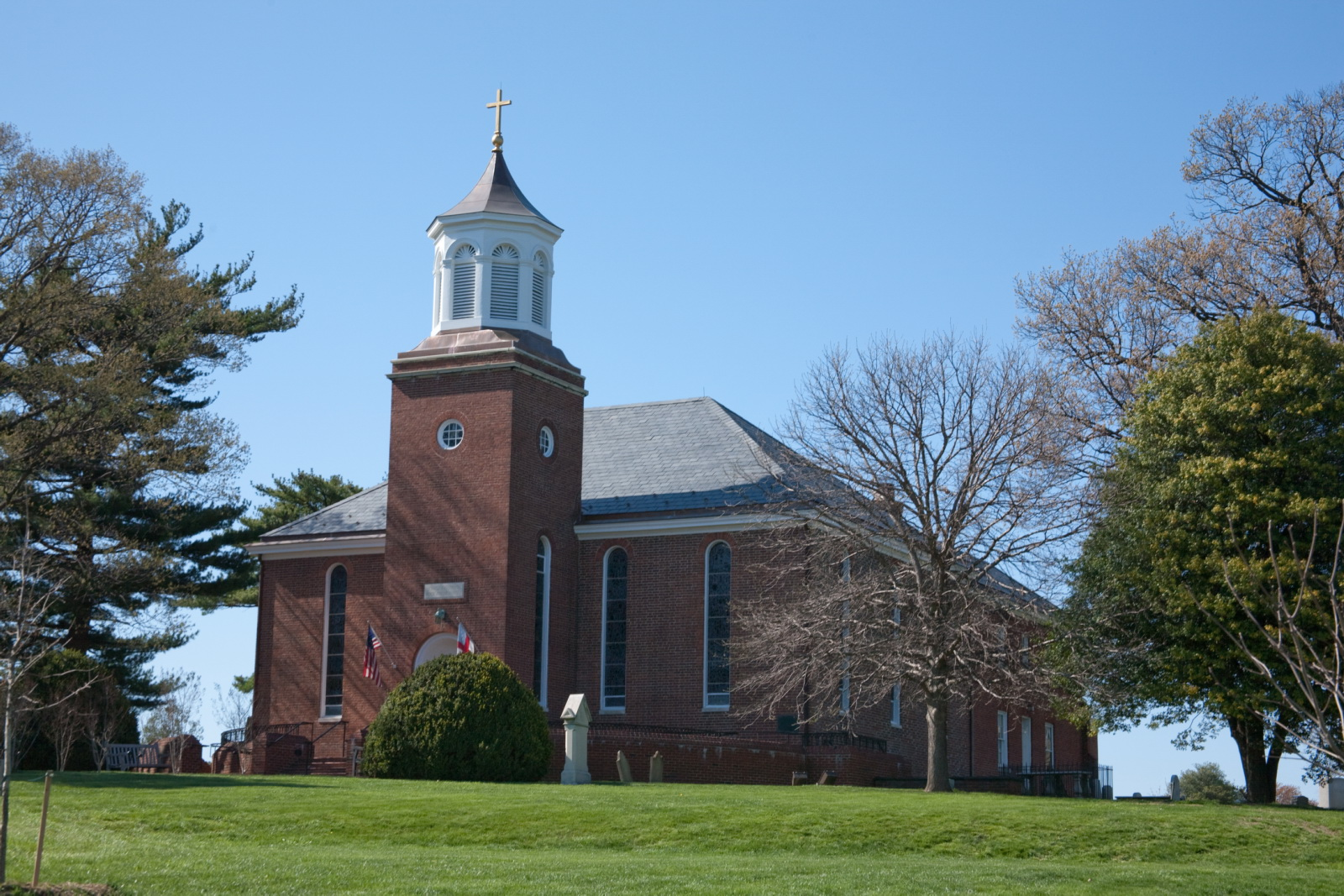
- Location: Rock Creek Church Road and Webster Street, NW; Washington, D.C. United States
- Built: 1775, 1853, 1922
- NRHP reference No.: 72001433
- Added to NRHP: March 16, 1972

St. Paul's Episcopal Church, Rock Creek Parish, is a historic Episcopal church located on Rock Creek Church Road, NW, in Washington, D.C., United States. The church reported 197 members in 2019 and 127 members in 2023; no membership statistics were reported in 2024 parochial reports. Plate and pledge income reported for the congregation in 2024 was $106,569. Average Sunday attendance (ASA) in 2024 was 48 persons.

== History ==
Founded in 1712 in then Prince George's County, Maryland, the congregation is the oldest religious institution within the boundaries of the present-day District of Columbia. The church was built in 1775, incorporating parts of an older church built in 1719. It was remodeled in 1853 and restored after a major fire in 1922, with Washington architect Delos H. Smith selected to serve as architect of the renovation. On March 16, 1972 St. Paul's was added to the National Register of Historic Places.

== See also ==
- List of the oldest churches in the United States
- National Register of Historic Places listings in Washington, D.C.
- Rock Creek Cemetery
