= Delos H. Smith =

American architect and architectural historian

Delos Hamilton Smith Jr. (May 10, 1884 – July 21, 1963) was an American architect and architectural historian.

== Education and career ==
Born in Willcox, Arizona, to Delos H. Smith Sr. and Martha McCurdy Smith, Smith attended public school in Washington, D.C., and received a B.S. in architecture from the George Washington University in 1906, apprenticing with the Office of Supervising Architect in the United States Department of the Treasury the same year.

He then worked as an apprentice for several architecture firms in short order, including Hornblower and Marshall from 1907 to 1909, Hill and Kendall from 1910 to 1911, and J.H. DeSibour from 1911 to 1912. He was a junior partner in the firm of Kendall & Smith from 1912 to 1916, also teaching architecture at the George Washington University during this time, where he also received an M.S. in architecture in 1916. He then established his own architecture firm, maintaining sole ownership until 1924, when he formed the partnership of Smith & Edwards.

Notable buildings designed by Smith include St. Paul's Episcopal Church, Rock Creek Parish (for renovation following a 1921 fire that gutted the church), the Montgomery County Courthouse in Rockville, Maryland, and the New York Avenue Presbyterian Church. During World War II, Smith was given charge of the Design Division at the Norfolk, Virginia, Navy Yard as a Commander in the United States Navy Reserve, where he "oversaw drafting production for a variety of industrial and military projects".

Smith was inducted as a fellow of the American Institute of Architects on March 12, 1952.

== Personal life and death ==
In 1928, Smith married Iris Bland, with whom he had one daughter, Marisa Smith.

He died in Alexandria, Virginia, at the age of 79.
