= Stanwich Church =

Coordinates: 41.107138°N 73.619356°W

Stanwich Church - Greenwich
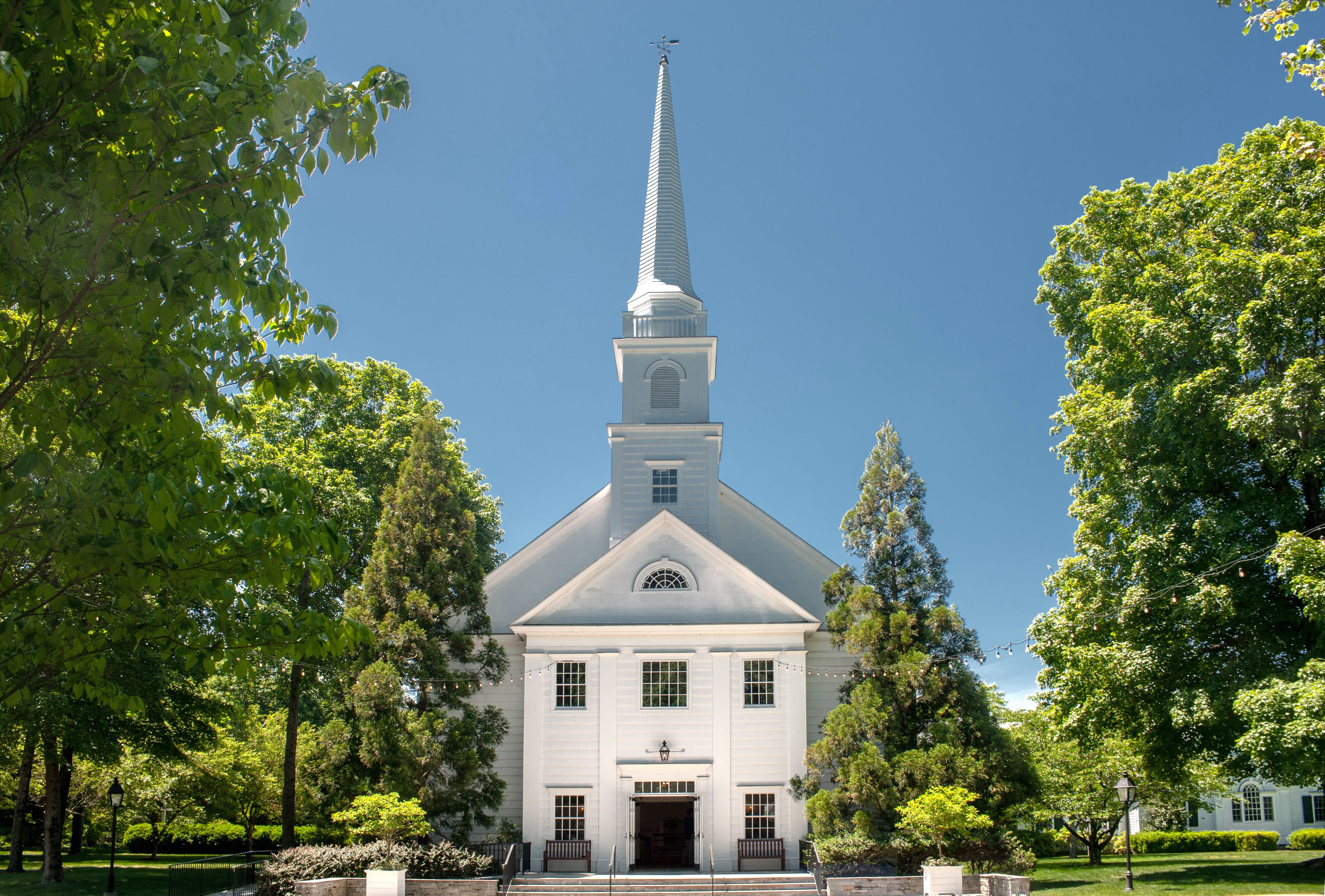
- Stanwich Church - Greenwich
- Location: 202 Taconic Road; Greenwich, Connecticut
- Country: United States
- Denomination: Nondenominational
- Website: www.stanwichchurch.org

History
- Founded: 1731

Stanwich Church - Stamford
- Stanwich Church - Stamford
- Location: 252 Atlantic Street; Stamford, Connecticut
- Country: United States
- Denomination: Nondenominational
- Website: www.stanwichchurch.org

History
- Founded: 1731

Stanwich Church is a nondenominational Christian church in Connecticut with the vision to know Christ and make him known. It was founded in 1731 in Greenwich, Connecticut by thirteen farmers and is one of the oldest continuously active church bodies in the United States. The congregation launched a second campus in Stamford, Connecticut, in 2014 and relaunched in 2026 with a permanent building.

Stanwich is dedicated to fostering deep connections with God and the community, believing that local churches are essential in addressing societal challenges. The church offers a variety of programs, including Kids and Student Ministries, Life Groups, and support services, aimed at promoting spiritual growth and fellowship amongst congregants.

With a focus on intergenerational discipleship, Stanwich Church emphasizes communal worship through traditional hymns and contemporary praise music, alongside scriptural teachings and the weekly celebration of the Lord's Supper. The church encourages participation in its ministries, inviting members to engage in service and build meaningful relationships.

== History ==
Stanwich Church was founded in 1731, one year before George Washington was born, as Stanwich Congregational Church. Thirteen families of Greenwich (then referred to as Horseneck) and North Stamford asked the colonial Connecticut General Assembly for permission to establish a new Congregational church in the Stanwich section of the town. At that time with the founding of the church, the Stanwich community was established, with an eventual inn and post office, where the pony express made its first stop out of New York. The center of the colonial community was the church.

The initial meeting place was a schoolhouse on North Street, and shortly after a small chapel at the corner of Taconic Road and North Stanwich, which was torn down in 1804 to erect a monumental church building for that day. The new building was known as one of Greenwich's landmarks and social centers in the "backcountry" and included a library. When that building burnt down on August 22,1923, due to lightning, the community moved church operations into a previously purchased unoccupied Methodist chapel one-half mile down the road at 237 Taconic Road. It had originally been purchased in 1895 by three members of the Stanwich congregation and was donated to the church to be used as a neighborhood community center.

In 1999, after a split in the main truss of the sanctuary roof was discovered, an anonymous group of church members, called the "Friends of Stanwich," purchased 30 acres of land another one-half mile down the road, and a new church at 202 Taconic Road was constructed entirely through private donations. The congregation began meeting in that new building in 2006.

Not only had Stanwich grown to the point that a new facility was required to house the church, Trinity Church was also planted in Greenwich in the 1990's due to Stanwich's growing congregation. This continuous presence, activity, and growth, makes Stanwich Church a testament to the words of Jesus, "I will build my church, and the gates of Hades will not prevail against it." Today, Stanwich has a second campus in Stamford, CT, which originally began meeting in a boxing gym but occupied a new building on Atlantic Street in 2026.
