= Tumwater Methodist Church =

Historic church in Washington, United States

- U.S. National Register of Historic Places
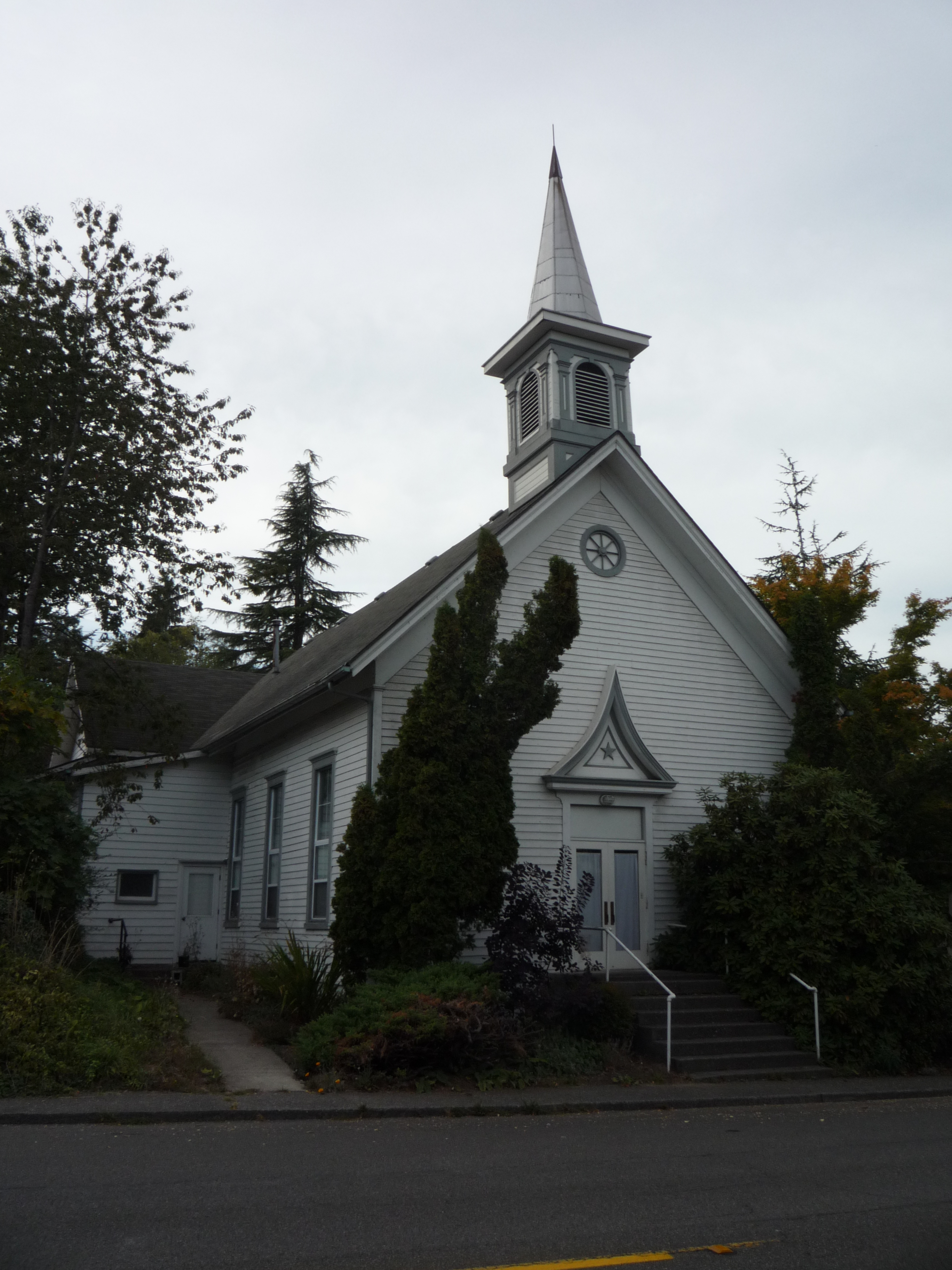
- Church in 2012
- Interactive map of Church location
- Location: 219 W. B St., Tumwater, Washington
- Coordinates: 47.01418310°N 122.90706509°W
- Area: less than one acre
- Built: 1872
- NRHP reference No.: 84003636
- Added to NRHP: January 12, 1984

Tumwater Methodist Church is a historic church at 219 W. B Street in Tumwater, Washington. It was built in 1872 and added to the National Register in 1984.

When it was built it was one of two churches in Tumwater, (the other being Baptist); initially the minister rode circuit preaching and serving much of Thurston County over the course of the week. The Olympia Methodist Church helped to support the Tumwater church's formation. In the 1930s the adjacent parsonage was sold and a two-story addition was built uphill from the original church which added a social hall, classrooms, and plumbing. The building served as the location of Tumwater Methodist Church for almost 100 years until they sold the property to Unitarians in the 1960s, who worshiped there it until outgrowing it and transferring ownership, in the early 1990s, to a Quaker congregation.

The building currently hosts St. James' Christian Episcopal Church. This congregation worships according to the Book of Common Prayer (1928) edition. Often considered a High Church tradition, which is found in many Anglo-Catholic parishes.
