= List of the oldest buildings in Maryland =

This article attempts to list some of the oldest extant buildings surviving in the state of Maryland in the United States of America. Some dates are approximate and based upon dendrochronology, architectural studies, and historical records. Sites on the list are generally from the First Period of American architecture or earlier. To be listed here a site must:

- date from prior to 1776; or
- be the oldest building in a county, large city, or oldest of its type (church, government building, etc.).

== Oldest overall ==
Building	Image	Location	Dated	Use	Notes
Brooke Place Manor		St. Leonard, Maryland	1652	Residence	This is primarily an 1840 structure; that year a "completely new interior" was installed; "all that remains of the first (1652) house are the (lower part of the) exterior walls." The original house was a Flemish bond brick structure of 1-1/2 stories with a very steep A-roof. The current 1840 building is a 2-1/2 story Greek revival structure with a gently sloping A-roof on 100 remaining acres of the original 2,100 acres granted to Robert Brooke, Sr in 1649.
Old Trinity Church (Church Creek)		Church Creek, Maryland	1675	Religious	Church building in continuous use; as such, oldest in the US.
Third Haven Meeting House		Talbot County, Maryland	1682	Religious	Oldest Quaker meeting house in the United States
Spring House, Ft. Lincoln Cemetery		Fort Lincoln Cemetery, Prince George's County, Maryland	1683	Springhouse	Small springhouse structure. In Maryland by 300 ft.
Fort Garrison		Stevenson, Maryland	c. 1695	Fort	
Holly Hill		Friendship, Maryland	1698 (fall or winter); 1713; c. 1730	Residence	Primitive, two-room, 1 1/2-story frame house at its incarnation. Two subsequent additions/upgrades performed, including a full structural brick encasement in c. 1730.
Morgan Hill Farm		Lusby, Maryland	c. 1700	Residence	Oldest part built between 1670 and 1700.
Sands House		Annapolis, Maryland	c. 1700s	Residence	Unconfirmed date of construction. Dendrochronology points to a date as early as 1681, but other sources point toward 1739. Historical marker inscribed with a c. 1700s date.
Sotterley Plantation		Hollywood, Maryland	1702	Museum	Popular public historic interpretation and living history exhibits
Cedar Park		Galesville, Maryland	1702	Residence	Date was ascertained through dendrochronology.
Cloverfields		Wye Mills, Maryland	1705	Residential	Dendrochronological analysis has been able to date a number of the key construction phases.
Rehoboth Presbyterian Church		Rehobeth, Maryland	1706; 1888; 1954–1955	Religious	Oldest Presbyterian Church in continuous use in the United States
Old Queen Anne's County Courthouse		Queenstown, Maryland	1708	Government	
Carvill Hall		Chestertown, Maryland	1694–1709	Residence	
All Hallows Church		Edgewater, Maryland	1710	Religious	
St. Paul's Episcopal Church		Fairlee, Maryland	1713	Religious	Associated vestry house, erected in 1766, is one of two that survive in the state (the other being at St. George's Church at Perryman).
Melwood Park		Prince George's County, Maryland	1714 (dendrochronology)	Residence	Originally thought to date to 1720s, but dendrochronology moved it back over a decade.
Shiplap House		Annapolis, Maryland	c. 1715	Tavern/store	One of the oldest buildings in Annapolis' colonial district.
Sarum		Newport, Maryland	1717	Residence	Constructed spring–summer 1717. Previously believed to be of 17th century origin. A shed on the site was built in 1736.
Richland Farm		Clarksville, Maryland	1719; 1920	Residence	Large addition to the rear added in 1920.
Ocean Hall		Bushwood, Maryland	1719	Residence	Date was ascertained through dendrochronology.
Bellefields		Croom, Maryland	c. 1720	Residence	
Presbury Meetinghouse		Aberdeen Proving Ground, Maryland	1720	Religious	
Sudley		Deale, Maryland	1720–1730	Residence	
Burch House		Port Tobacco, Maryland	1720–1730	Residence	
Rich Hill		Bel Alton, Maryland	1720–1740	Residence	
Charles Carroll House		Annapolis, Maryland	1721	Residence	One of 15 surviving birthplaces of the signers of the Declaration of Independence.
White House Farm		Chestertown, Maryland	1721; 1831	Residence	Original section built in 1721.
Anne Arundel County Free School		Davidsonville, Maryland	1724	School	Only surviving school built in response to the Maryland Free School Act of 1723.
East Nottingham Friends Meetinghouse		Rising Sun, Maryland	1724; 1752	Meetinghouse	Brick portion burned in 1749; rebuilt and enlarged in 1752, with the original brick walls remaining
Preston-on-the-Patuxent		Johnstown, Maryland	1725	Residence	Originally thought to date to 1651
Marshall Hall		Bryans Road, Maryland	1725	Residence	Earliest portioned built in 1725, with several additions later on. Severely damaged by fire sometime after 1980. A small brick building near it built around 1760.
Salisbury Plantation		Westover, Maryland	1725	Residence	
Great House		St. Augustine, Maryland	1725–1750	Residence	Built during second quarter of 18th century.
Rockburn		Ellicott City, Maryland	1727	Residence	
Doughoregan Manor		Ellicott City, Maryland	1727; 1832	Residence	Earliest portioned built in 1727, enlarged and remodeled in 1832.
St. Luke's Church		Church Hill, Maryland	c. 1729-1732	Religious	
Yarmouth		Cambridge, Maryland	c. 1730s	Residence	
Larkin's Hundred		Harwood, Maryland	c. 1730	Residence	Traditionally said to be built in 1704, more likely built second half of 18th century.
Bishopton		Church Hill, Maryland	c. 1730	Residence	
Hopkins-Matthews House		Darlington, Maryland	c. 1730	Residence	
Kingston		Upper Marlboro, Maryland	c. 1730	Residence	
Readbourne		Centerville, Maryland	c. 1730; 1791; 1948	Residence	Center block from 1730, south wing build in 1791. North wing was built in 1948.
Hopewell		Providence, Cecil County	1730–1750	Residence	
Christ Church		Nanjemoy, Maryland	1732	Religious	One of the oldest Episcopal church buildings in Maryland.
Rigbie House		Berkley, Maryland	c. 1732–1750	Residence	
Bowlingly		Queenstown, Maryland	1733; 1817; 1954	Residence	Severely damaged in the War of 1812 by British forces. Enlarged in 1954.
Williams' Conquest		Marion Station, Maryland	1733; 1825; 1850; 1968	Residence	
St. Paul's Parish Church		Brandywine, Maryland	c. 1733–1735; 1769; 1793; 1921	Religious	
St. Bartholomew's Episcopal Church		Quantico, Maryland	1733	Religious	
Old Treasury Building		Annapolis, Maryland	1735	Government	Oldest government building in Annapolis
Bennett's Adventure		Allen, Maryland	c. 1735	Residence	
Belvoir		Crownsville, Maryland	c. 1736	Residence	Earliest portion could date to 17th century.
Reynold's Tavern		Annapolis, Maryland	1737	Tavern	
Valley Cottage		Georgetown, Maryland	1737–1776	Residence	Situated on original plot from 1737, unknown when it was actually built.
Jonas Green House		Annapolis, Maryland	1738	Residence	
Belmont Estate		Elkridge, Maryland	1738	Residence	
Ogle Hall		Annapolis, Maryland	1739	Residence	
Reward-Tilden's Farm		Chestertown, Maryland	c. 1740–1749	Residence	Built in the 1740s
Hager House		Hagerstown, Maryland	1740	Residence	Built by Jonathan Hager, the founder of Hagerstown, and the oldest building in Washington County
Friendship		Stevensville, Maryland	1740	Residence	
Robinson House		Severna Park, Maryland	1740	Residence	
Worthington House		Darlington, Maryland	c. 1740	Residence	
Best Endeavor		Churchville, Maryland	1740; 1785	Residence	East portion of house added on in 1785.
Bull-Barrow House		Bel Air, Maryland	c. 1740	Residence	
Deer Park House		Dublin, Maryland	c. 1740–1741	Residence	
Belair Mansion		Bowie, Maryland	c. 1740–1745	Residence	
Waddy House		Princess Anne, Maryland	c. 1740–1760	Residence	
Patrick Creagh House		Annapolis, Maryland	1741	Residence	
St. Thomas Manor		Port Tobacco, Maryland	1741	Residence	Connected chapel built in 1798
Pemberton Hall		Salisbury, Maryland	1741	Residence	
South River Club		South River, Maryland	1742	Clubhouse	
St. John's College (McDowell Hall)		Annapolis, Maryland	1742	School	
Buckland		East New Market, Maryland	c. 1742	Residence	
Clifton		Ednor, Maryland	c. 1742	Residence	
Darnall's Chance		Upper Marlboro, Maryland	c. 1742	Residence	
St. Thomas' Church		Upper Marlboro, Maryland	c. 1742–1745; 1859; 1888; 1905	Religious	
William Hilleary House		Bladensburg, Maryland	c. 1742–1746	Residence	
St. Thomas Church		Owings Mills, Maryland	1743	Religious	
Priest Neal's Mass House and Mill Site		Bel Air, Maryland	c. 1743	Religious	One of the oldest extant buildings associated with the Catholic Church in America.
Obligation		Harwood, Maryland	1743; 1827	Residence	
William Barroll House		Chestertown, Maryland	c. 1743	Residence	
Bohemia Farm		Earleville, Maryland	c. 1743–1745	Residence	
Woodview		Bel Air, Maryland	1744; 1820	Residence	
Middleham Chapel		Lusby, Maryland	1744	Religious	Built in 1748, replacing an earlier building erected around 1684
John Churchman House		Calvert, Maryland	1745; 1785	Residence	
Araby		Mason's Springs, Maryland	1746	Residence	"Dendrochronological analysis has shown that one of the timbers used to construct the original building was felled in the spring of 1746."
Mercer Brown House		Rising Sun, Maryland	1746	Residence	
Derr House		Frederick, Maryland	1790 - 1795	Residence	
Custom House		Chestertown, Maryland	1746	Residence	
Bostwick		Bladensburg, Maryland	1746	Residence	
Broom's Bloom		Bel Air, Maryland	1747	Residence	
Christ Church		Accokeek, Maryland	1747	Religious	Begun in 1747, replacing an earlier frame building.
Beatty-Cramer House		Frederick, Maryland	1748; 1855	Residence	Addition constructed in 1855. Dendrochronological research to date the structure is ongoing. Oldest standing home in Frederick County, MD.
All Hallows Episcopal Church		Snow Hill, Maryland	1748	Religious	
London Town Publik House		Woodland Beach, Maryland	c. 1745–1750	Tavern	
Wilton		Wye Mills, Maryland	c. 1749–1770; 1800	Residence	
Perry Point Mansion House		Perryville, Maryland	c. 1750	Residence	
Stump Family Grist Mill		Perryville, Maryland	c. 1750	Mill	
Buckingham House		Buckeystown, Maryland	c. 1750	Residence	School is a later addition to the attached house.
Howard Lodge		Sykesville, Maryland	c. 1750	Residence	
Indian Queen Tavern and Black's Store		Charlestown, Maryland	1750	Hotel/Retail	
Judge John Brice House		Annapolis, Maryland	1750	Residence	Could've been built even earlier, possibly in 1739.
Rosehill		Gambrills, Maryland	1750	Residence	
The Homestead		Baldwin, Maryland	1750	Residence	
Rodgers Tavern		Perryville, Maryland	1750	Hotel	
Chimney House		Port Tobacco, Maryland	1750	Residence	
Poplar Hill		Aberdeen, Maryland	1750	Residence	
Mount Pleasant		Upper Marlboro, Maryland	c. 1750	Residence	
Piscataway House		Fort Washington, Maryland	c. 1750; 1932	Residence	Relocated from its original location in Piscataway, Maryland in the 1930s. Disassembled and rebuilt on present location.
Potter Hall		Williston, Maryland	1750; 1808; 1930	Residence	Central section built in 1750, 2 1/2-story Flemish bond brick structure built about 1808. Single story kitchen wing built in 1930.
Joshua's Meadows		Bel Air, Maryland	1750; 1937	Residence	
White Swan Tavern		Chestertown, Maryland	c. 1750	Tavern	
Piscataway Tavern		Piscataway, Maryland	c. 1750; 1810	Tavern	Larger Federal addition from 1810, replacing original structure.
Wyoming		Clinton, Maryland	c. 1750; 1800; 1850	Residence	Connecting two-bay section built in 1850.
Waterloo		Princess Anne, Maryland	c. 1750–1760	Residence	
Ellerslie		Port Tobacco, Maryland	c. 1750–1765	Residence	
Rose Hill		Chestertown, Maryland	c. 1750–1775	Residence	
Elk Landing		Elkton, Maryland	c. 1750–1775	Residence	
Maidstone		Owings, Maryland	1751	Residence	Previously believed to date to the 17th century, a dendrochronology survey determined time period of fall-winter 1751.
Blunt Farm and Granite Quarries		Granite, Maryland	1751	Farm	
Kitterman–Buckey Farm		Johnsville, Maryland	1752	Farm	Springhouse and Cabin on property also date from 1752
Rising Sun Inn		Crownsville, Maryland	1753	Residence	
Larkin's Hill Farm		Harwood, Maryland	1753	Residence	
Rich Hill		Sassafras, Maryland	c. 1753	Residence	
Knocks Folly		Kennedyville, Maryland	c. 1753	Residence	
Wye Mill		Wye Mills, Maryland	1753-1754	Mill	Dendrochronological analysis has shown that the frame building was constructed from timbers felled in the spring of 1751 and the winter of 1753/4, suggesting that the building was constructed in the winter of 1753/4 or shortly thereafter.
Portland Manor		Lothian, Maryland	1755	Residence	Date was ascertained through dendrochronology
St. James Church		Monkton, Maryland	1755	Religious	Bell tower added in 1884.
The Ridge		Derwood, Maryland	1755	Residence	
Tulip Hill		Galesville, Maryland	1755–1756	Residence	
George Washington House		Bladensburg, Maryland	c. 1755–1765	Tavern	
Jeremiah Brown House and Mill Site		Rising Sun, Maryland	1757	Residence	
Schifferstadt		Frederick, Maryland	1758	Residence	Oldest surviving building in Frederick city. Open for tours on weekend afternoons from April through November.
Maynadier House		Cambridge, Maryland	c. 1759	Residence	Right wing of house built in 1759.
Legg's Dependence		Stevensville, Maryland	1760	Residence	Built in several stages beginning around 1760–80. Enlarged to present form during the second quarter of the 19th century.
Mattapax		Stevensville, Maryland	1760; 1949	Residence	Restored in 1949, a wing was replaced by a newly constructed brick wing.
Howard's Inheritance		Annapolis, Maryland	1760	Residence	
Swansbury		Aberdeen, Maryland	c. 1760; 1775	Residence	West section dates back to c. 1760. Main structure built in 1780.
Daffin House		Hillsboro, Maryland	c. 1760; 1780	Residence	Brick wing built c. 1760. Main structure built in 1780.
Primrose Hill		Annapolis, Maryland	ca. 1760	Residence	
LaGrange		Cambridge, Maryland	c. 1760	Residence	
Cox-Davis-Barnes House		Churchville, Maryland	c. 1760	Residence	
Lexon		Centerville, Maryland	c. 1760	Residence	
Lansdowne		Centerville, Maryland	c. 1760; 1823	Residence	Smaller building is from 1760. Larger building built in 1823.
Harmony Hall		Fort Washington, Maryland	c. 1760–1769	Residence	Local tradition has it being built in 1723.
Rock United Presbyterian Church		Elkton, Maryland	1761	Religious	Remodeled to its current Victorian Gothic influenced appearance in 1872, and 1900. Also on the property is a stone Session House originally constructed in 1762.
Pleasant Hill		Pomfret, Maryland	1761	Residence	Earliest portion dates back to 1761. Added onto until about 1848.
Hopeful Unity		Worton, Maryland	1761	Residence	May encapsulate an even older structure.
Bush Tavern		Abingdon, Maryland	1761-1762	Tavern	"Dendrochronological analysis has shown that the original structure was built from timbers felled in the winter of 1761/2."
Upton Scott House		Annapolis, Maryland	1762	Residence	
Ratcliffe Manor		Easton, Maryland	1762	Residence	One of the best examples of early Georgian style plantation houses on Maryland's Eastern Shore.
Acton Hall		Annapolis, Maryland	1762	Residence	
La Grange		La Plata, Maryland	c. 1763	Residence	
Hockley		Elkridge, Maryland	c. 1763	Residence	
St. James Episcopal Church		Lothian, Maryland	1763	Religious	Replaced an earlier structure dating to 1695. Oldest documented gravestone in Maryland (dated 1665) is found in the churchyard.
Paca House and Garden		Annapolis, Maryland	1763	Residence	
Michael Cresap House		Oldtown, Maryland	1764	Residence	
Peggy Stewart House		Annapolis, Maryland	1764	Residence	
Mitchell House		Fair Hill, Maryland	1764	Residence	
Long Island Farm		Parkville, Maryland	1764	Farm	
Galloway Mansion		Queenstown, Maryland	1764	Residence	Moved from its original location at Easton, Maryland in 2019.
John Ridout House		Annapolis, Maryland	1764–1765	Residence	
Cross Manor		St. Inigoes, Maryland	"Prior to 1765"	Residence	
Whitehall		Annapolis, Maryland	c. 1765	Residence	
Sycamore Cottage		Cambridge, Maryland	c. 1765	Residence	
Market Master's House		Bladensburg, Maryland	c. 1765	Residence	
Robert Long House		Baltimore, Maryland	1765	Residence	Oldest surviving residential structure in Baltimore City
Manokin Presbyterian Church		Princess Anne, Maryland	1765	Religious	Georgian nave constructed in 1765, vestry and tower added in 1872, and 1888, respectively
Fugate House		Monkton, Maryland	1765-1766	Residence	
Branton Manor		Sykesville, Maryland	c. 1766	Residence	Oldest sections date to 1766. Middle portion was a later addition.
St. George's Parish Vestry House		Perryman, Maryland	1766	Religious	
Stagg Hall		Port Tobacco, Maryland	1766-1767	Residence	"A dendrochronological study was undertaken on the building in October 2015. Two of the timbers that were sampled were successfully dated, with one timber containing complete sapwood that provided a felling date of the winter of 1766/7."
Brice House		Annapolis, Maryland	1766–1773	Residence	
Cooke's Range at Pope Farm		Derwood, Maryland	1767	Residence	"Dendrochronological analysis has shown that the original three-bay structure was built in the winter of 1766/7 or shortly thereafter."
Mount Clare		Baltimore, Maryland	1767	Residence	Oldest Colonial-era structure in Baltimore, Maryland.
Spye Park		White Plains, Maryland	1767	Residence	
Ringgold-Pearce House		Chestertown, Maryland	1767	Residence	
St. John's Episcopal Church		Fort Washington, Maryland	1767	Religious	Located in the Broad Creek Historic District. The building is the 4th iteration of the church since the original was erected in 1695.
Tubman Chapel, St. Mary's Star of the Sea Roman Catholic Church		Church Creek, Maryland	1767–1770	Religious	Also used as a school house after later Victorian Era church was built across the road.
Shepherd's Delight		Still Pond, Maryland	1767–1783; 1810	Residence	Built between 1767 and 1783.
Maxwell Hall		Patuxent, Maryland	c. 1767	Residence	
Long Hill		Wetipquin, Maryland	1767	Residence	
Sophia's Dairy		Aberdeen, Maryland	1768	Residence	
Emmanuel Episcopal Church		Chestertown, Maryland	1768	Religious	
Drury-Austin House		Boyds, Maryland	1768	Residence	
Harmony Hall		Fort Washington, Maryland	1769	Residence	Located in the Broad Creek Historic District. It was originally known as Battersea, and overlooked the colonial port of Aire.
Joseph Fiery House		Clear Spring, Maryland	1769	Residence	Dendrochronological analysis has shown that the original structure was built from timbers felled in the winter of 1767/8 and the winter of 1768/9.
Widehall		Chestertown, Maryland	1769	Residence	
Chase–Lloyd House		Annapolis, Maryland	1769–1774	Residence	
Mitchell House		Elkton, Maryland	c. 1769–1781	Residence	
Artisan's House		Annapolis, Maryland	c. 1700s	Residence	Date of construction unknown, used as barracks during the American Revolutionary War.
Hazelwood		Upper Marlboro, Maryland	c. 1770s; 1800; 1860	Residence	
Greenfields		Cecilton, Maryland	1770	Residence	Possibly built earlier, 1740–1760.
Truman's Place		Hughesville, Maryland	1770	Residence	
Colonel Joseph Wood House		Woodsboro, Maryland	1770	Residence	
Retreat		Port Tobacco, Maryland	c. 1770	Residence	
Handsell		Vienna, Maryland	c. 1770	Residence	
Mill Green Miller's House		Street, Maryland	c. 1770	Residence	
Hebron		Still Pond, Maryland	c. 1770	Residence	
London Coffee House		Baltimore, Maryland	c. 1770–1772	Public	
Haberdeventure		Port Tobacco, Maryland	1771	Residence	
Mary's Mount		Harwood, Maryland	1771	Residence	Earliest portion built in 1771. Enlarged in early 19th century.
Maryland Inn		Annapolis, Maryland	c. 1772	Hotel	
Pipe Creek Friends Meetinghouse		Union Bridge, Maryland	1772	Meeting House	Interior destroyed by fire in 1934.
Maryland State House		Annapolis, Maryland	1772–1797	Government	Oldest state house in continuous use in the United States.
Perry Hall Mansion		Perry Hall, Maryland	1773; 1826	Residence	Originally constructed in 1773, badly damaged in fire in 1826. Only half of main section and west wing were saved.
The Robert Johnson House		Annapolis, Maryland	1773	Hotel	
Preacher House		Darlington, Maryland	1773	Residence	
Round About Hills		Glenwood, Maryland	1773	Residence	
Gunpowder Meetinghouse		Aberdeen Proving Ground, Maryland	c. 1773	Religious	Unknown if it is actually from 1773, but no evidence against it, as well.
Chesterville Brick House		Chesterville, Maryland	c. 1773	Commercial	Moved from its original location in 1973.
Ridout Row		Annapolis, Maryland	1773–1774	Residence	
Hammond–Harwood House		Annapolis, Maryland	1774	Residential	Only existing work of colonial academic architecture that was principally designed from a plate in Andrea Palladio's I quattro libri dell'architettura (The Four Books of Architecture).
Catoctin Furnace		Frederick County, Maryland	1774	Iron Forge	Provided ammunition for American Revolutionary War
Hinchingham		Rock Hall, Maryland	1774	Residence	
Sexton's House		Worton, Maryland	c. 1774–1793	Residence	Sexton's house is the only structure that dates back to 1700s.
Reed's Creek Farm		Centreville, Maryland	1775	Residence	
Fat Oxen		Urbana, Maryland	c. 1775	Residence	
Little Elk Farm		Providence, Cecil County	c. 1775–1800	Residence	
Governor Calvert House		Annapolis, Maryland	1776	Hotel	Original house burned in 1764, what was remaining of that was built into the current building. Original building dating back to early 18th century.
Mount Friendship		Darlington, Maryland	1776; 1821	Residence	
Bayly House		Cambridge, Maryland	c. 1784	Residence	Oldest home in Cambridge. Dated with dendrochronology

== Oldest by county ==
County	Building	Image	Location	Dated	Use	Notes
Calvert County	Brooke Place Manor		St. Leonard, Maryland	1652	Residence	
Dorchester County	Old Trinity Church, Maryland		Church Creek, Dorchester County, Maryland	1675	Religious	Church building in continuous use; as such, oldest in the US.
Talbot County	Third Haven Meeting House		Talbot County, Maryland	1682	Religious	Oldest Quaker meeting house in the United States.
Prince George's County County	Spring House, Ft. Lincoln Cemetery		Fort Lincoln Cemetery, Prince George's County, Maryland	1683	Springhouse	Small springhouse structure. In Maryland by 300 ft.
Baltimore County	Fort Garrison		Stevenson, Baltimore County, Maryland	c. 1695	Fort	
Anne Arundel County	Holly Hill		Friendship, Anne Arundel County, Maryland	1698 (fall or winter); 1713; c. 1730	Residence	Primitive, two-room, 1 1/2-story frame house at its incarnation. Two subsequent additions/upgrades performed, including a full structural brick encasement in c. 1730.
St. Mary's County	Sotterley Plantation		Hollywood, Maryland	1702	Museum	Popular public historic interpretation and living history exhibits
Somerset County	Rehoboth Presbyterian Church		Rehobeth, Maryland	1706; 1888; 1954–1955	Religious	Oldest Presbyterian Church in continuous use in the United States
Queen Anne's County	Old Queen Anne's County Courthouse		Queenstown, Maryland	1708	Governmental	
Kent County	Carvill Hall		Chestertown, Maryland	1694–1709	Residence	
Charles County	Sarum		Newport, Maryland	1717	Residence	Constructed spring–summer 1717. Previously believed to be of 17th century origin.
Howard County	Richland Farm		Clarksville, Maryland	1719; 1920	Residence	Large addition to the rear added in 1920.
Harford County	Presbury Meetinghouse		Aberdeen Proving Ground, Maryland	1720	Religious	
Cecil County	East Nottingham Friends Meetinghouse		Rising Sun, Maryland	1724; 1752	Meetinghouse	Brick portion burned in 1749; rebuilt and enlarged in 1752, with the original brick walls remaining
Wicomico County	St. Bartholomew's Episcopal Church		Quantico, Maryland	1733	Religious	
Washington County	Hager House		Hagerstown, Maryland	1740	Residence	Built by Jonathan Hager, the founder of Hagerstown
Montgomery County	Clifton		Ednor, Maryland	c. 1742	Residence	
Frederick County	Derr House		Frederick, Maryland	1746	Residence	
Worcester County	All Hallows Episcopal Church		Snow Hill, Maryland	1748	Religious	
Caroline County	Daffin House		Hillsboro, Maryland	c. 1760; 1780	Residence	Brick wing built c. 1760. Main structure built in 1780.
Allegany County	Michael Cresap House		Oldtown, Maryland	1764	Residence	
Baltimore City	Robert Long House		Baltimore, Maryland	1765	Residence	
Carroll County	Branton Manor		Sykesville, Maryland	c. 1766	Residence	Oldest sections date to 1766. Middle portion was a later addition.
Garrett County	Stanton's Mill		Grantsville, Maryland	1797; 1890	Grist mill	

== Oldest by type ==
Type	Building	Image	Location	Dated	Notes
Residence	Brooke Place Manor		St. Leonard, Maryland	1652	This is primarily an 1840 structure; that year a "completely new interior" was installed; "all that remains of the first (1652) house are the (lower part of the) exterior walls." The original house was a Flemish bond brick structure of 1-1/2 stories with a very steep A-roof. The current 1840 building is a 2-1/2 story Greek revival structure with a gently sloping A-roof on 100 remaining acres of the original 2,100 acres granted to Robert Brooke, Sr in 1649.
Residence	Holly Hill		Friendship, Maryland	1698 (fall or winter); 1713; c. 1730	Primitive, two-room, 1 1/2-story frame house at its incarnation. Two subsequent additions/upgrades performed, including a full structural brick encasement in c. 1730.
Church	Old Trinity Church (Church Creek)		Church Creek, Maryland	1675	Church building in continuous use; as such, oldest in the US.
Quaker meeting house	Third Haven Meeting House		Talbot County, Maryland	1682	Oldest Quaker meetinghouse in the United States
Government building	Old Queen Anne's County Courthouse		Queenstown, Maryland	1708	
Barn	Evergreen (barn)		Mount Savage, Maryland	1834	Dendrochronological analysis has shown that the barn was built from timbers felled in the winter of 1833/4.
Lighthouse	Pooles Island Light		Pooles Island off Aberdeen Proving Ground	1825	Oldest surviving lighthouse in Maryland
Shot tower	Phoenix Shot Tower		Baltimore, Maryland	1828	Only surviving shot tower in Maryland, third oldest in the U.S.
Train station	Ellicott City station		Ellicott City, Maryland	1830	Oldest surviving passenger train station in the U.S.
Synagogue	Lloyd Street Synagogue		Baltimore, Maryland	1840	Oldest surviving synagogue building in Maryland, third oldest in the U.S.
Mosque	Islamic Society of Baltimore		Catonsville, Maryland	1982	Oldest purpose-built mosque in Maryland; others have existed for decades

== See also ==
- List of the oldest buildings in the United States
- National Register of Historic Places listings in Maryland
