= Cross Manor =

Historic house in Maryland, US

- U.S. National Register of Historic Places
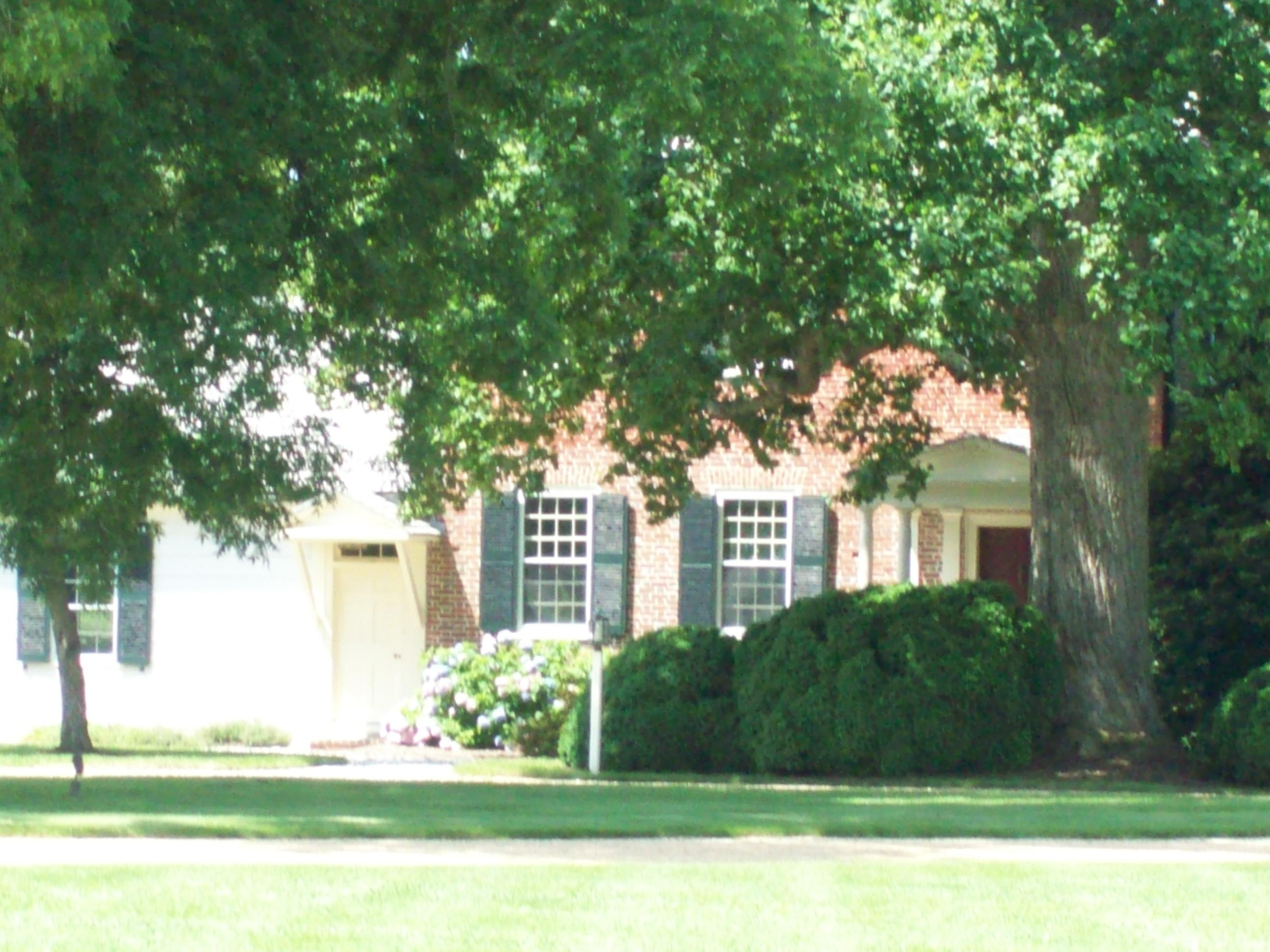
- Cross Manor, July 2009

- Location within Maryland Location within the United States
- Nearest city: St. Inigoes, Maryland
- Coordinates: 38°9′40″N 76°25′23″W
- Built: c. 1765
- Architectural style: Greek Revival, Federal
- NRHP reference No.: 88001705
- Added to NRHP: October 6, 1988

Cross Manor is a historic home located at St. Inigoes, St. Mary's County, Maryland, United States. It is a 2 1/2-story brick house with a side-hall double parlor plan and Greek Revival and Federal influenced woodwork. The house was constructed in three main stages with the earliest reportedly dating to before 1765. Other estimates date the house's origin to "before 1798", with further additions during the 19th century. Shortly after the house was acquired by Grace Anne and Ted Koppel in 1987, the property underwent significant renovations under the supervision of Annapolis-based architectural firm, Bignell/Watkins .

Cross Manor was listed on the National Register of Historic Places in 1988. Ted Koppel Listed the estate in 2013 at just under $4 million for 110 acres on St. Inigoes Creek. Koppel and his wife, Grace Anne Dorney, bought the estate in 1987 for $843,088, the house dates to "at least 1765."

== See also ==
- List of the oldest buildings in Maryland
