= Christ Church (Ironsides, Maryland) =

Church building in Maryland, United States of America

Coordinates: 38°29′21″N 77°9′41″W

Christ Church (also known as Old Durham Church) is one of the oldest (1732) surviving Episcopal church buildings in the U.S. state of Maryland. Christ Church is located in the village of Ironsides within the town of Nanjemoy. Old Trinity Church, Church Creek, Dorchester County, dates to c. 1675 is older.

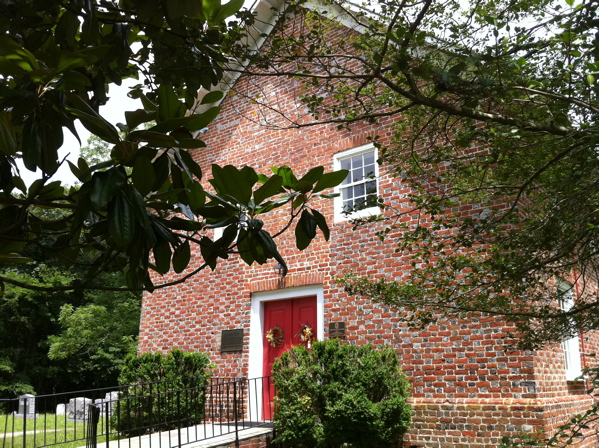
Christ Church, Durham Parish, Charles County, Maryland, 1732 church building.

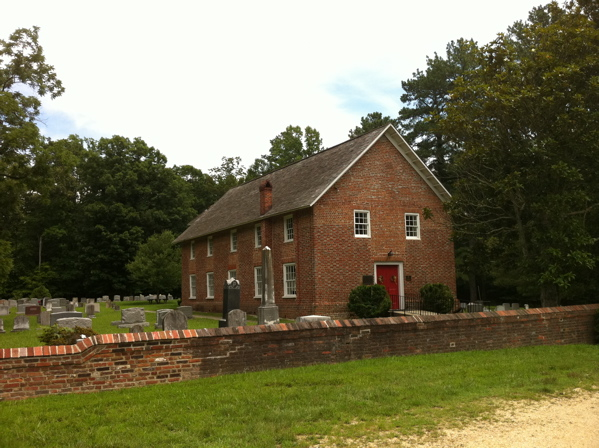
Christ Church, Durham Parish, Charles County, Maryland, 1732 church building, view from front showing the northside graves.

The parish was established in 1661 and chartered in 1692. The original church building was a log structure, which was replaced with the current brick church building in 1732; the 1732 building was enlarged and renovated in 1791. Revolutionary War General William Smallwood and colonial Governor William Stone are buried in the churchyard.

== See also ==
- List of the original 30 Anglican parishes in the Province of Maryland
- List of the oldest buildings in Maryland
- Oldest churches in the United States
