= Morgan Hill Farm =

Historic house in Maryland, United States

- U.S. National Register of Historic Places
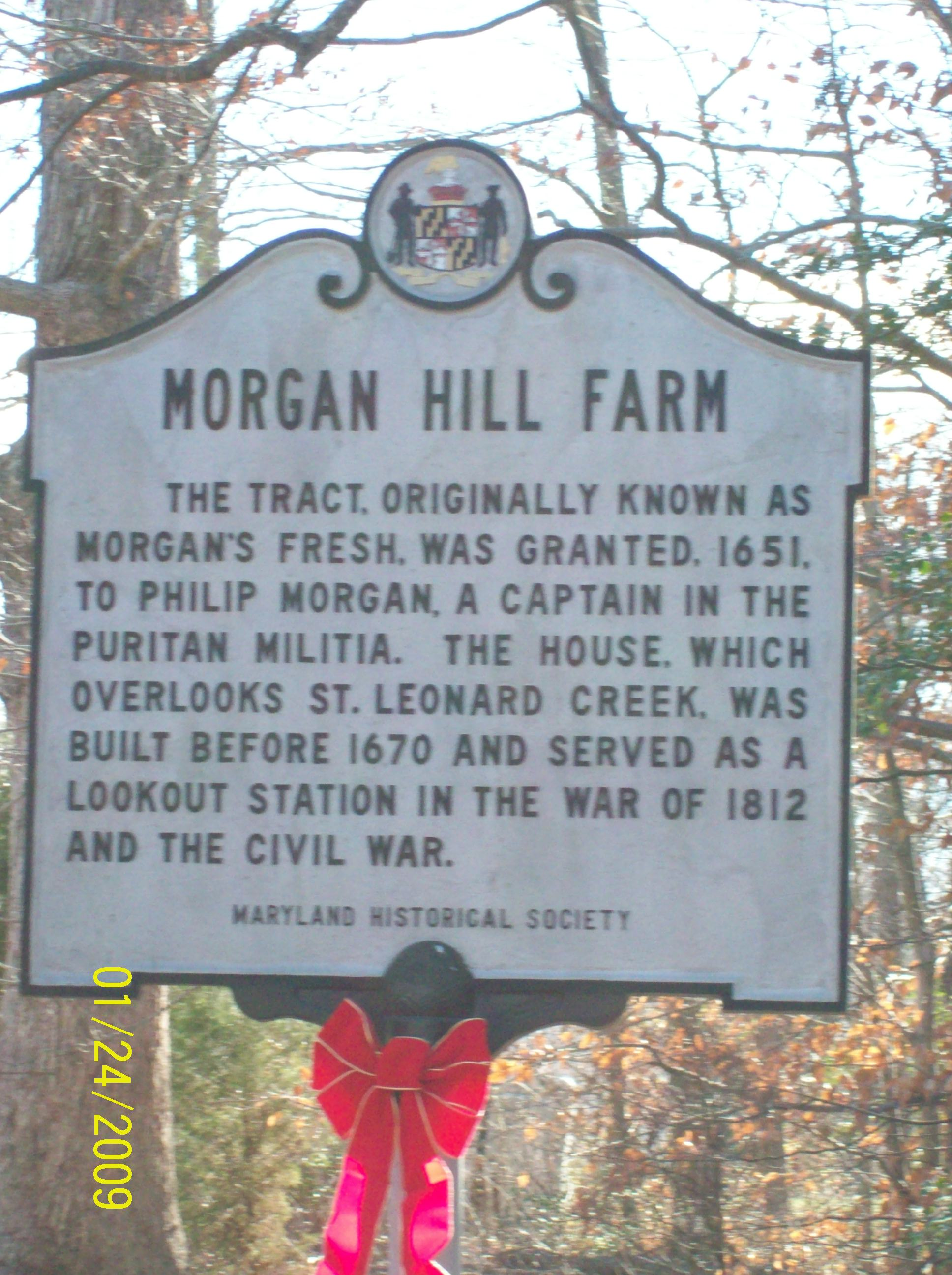
- Morgan Hill Farm - Sign, December 2008

- Location within Maryland Location within the United States
- Nearest city: Lusby, Maryland
- Coordinates: 38°24′35″N 76°28′46″W
- NRHP reference No.: 76000981
- Added to NRHP: April 3, 1976

Morgan Hill Farm, also known as Morgan's Fresh or Hill Farm, is a historic home located at Lusby, Calvert County, Maryland. It is a 1 1/2-story gable-roofed frame house of a T-shaped plan, with single exterior chimneys on each of the three exposed ends. The original building appears to have been built about 1700, with extensively remodeled in the early 19th century. In 1952 a large rear wing was added to the house. Outbuildings include a one-story log servants' quarter, a log smokehouse, and a large tobacco barn.

Phillip Morgan received the original land grant in 1651, under the name Morgan's Fresh. Morgan, a captain in the Puritan Militia and a locally prominent man, and sold the property in 1670 to Robert Day. In 1836 the property was sold by Day's descendants to Richard Breeden, who was probably responsible for the extensive renovations made to the house in the early 19th century and renamed the property Hill Farm.

It was listed on the National Register of Historic Places in 1976.

== See also ==
- List of the oldest buildings in Maryland
