= Old Trinity Church (Church Creek) =

Church in Maryland, US

Coordinates: 38.50380°N 76.16699°W

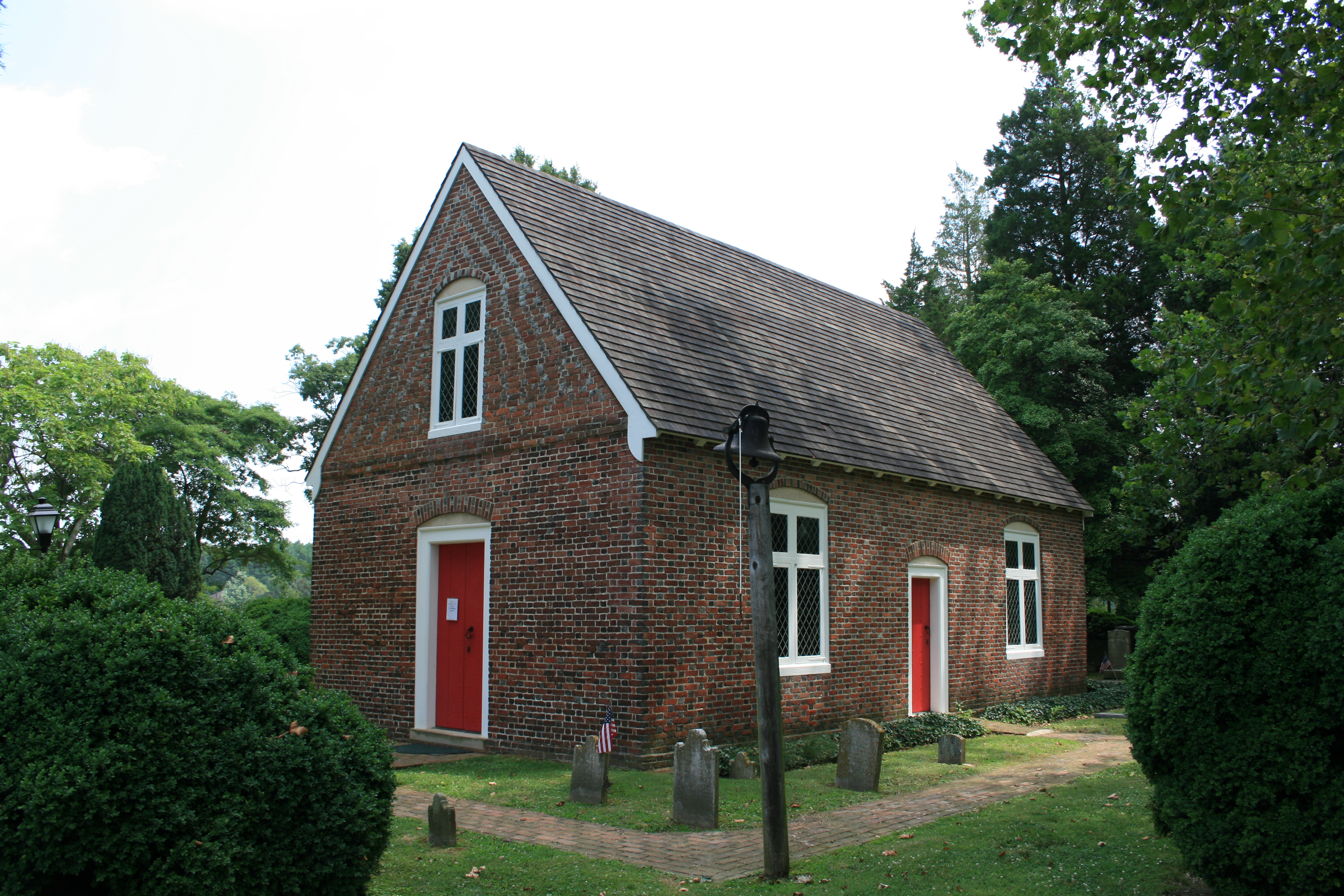
Old Trinity Church

Old Trinity Church is an historic Episcopal church at 1716 Taylors Island Road in Church Creek, Maryland. It was built around 1675 of red brick and is one of the oldest church buildings in continuous use in the continental United States and original thirteen states. The church was restored in the 1950s and still holds regular Sunday worship services and has an active burial ground.

== See also ==
- List of the oldest churches in the United States
- List of the oldest buildings in Maryland
