= Robert Long House =

Historic house in the Fell's Point neighborhood of Baltimore, Maryland, US

- Interactive map of the Robert Long House area

General information
- Status: Completed
- Type: Residential
- Location: Baltimore, Maryland, United States, 812 South Ann Street
- Coordinates: 39°16′55.946″N 76°35′28.892″W
- Completed: 1765

Technical details
- Floor count: 3

The Robert Long House is a rowhouse in the Fell's Point neighborhood of Baltimore. The house is the oldest known surviving urban residence within the city of Baltimore, built in 1765. It was built as the home of Robert Long, a local Baltimore merchant, and today serves as the home of the Fells Point Preservation Society, who saved it from demolition in 1969 by purchasing it and restoring it.

The house is atypical of the surrounding area, with the architecture of the house matching that of homes built in the southern part of Pennsylvania where Long was born, rather than the standard rowhouses that make up the Fells Point neighborhood. The home was originally a two-story rowhouse, with the third story added sometime in the mid- to late 1800s, covered with a mixture of tar and granite, known as "flint coat".
