= The Ridge (Derwood, Maryland) =

Historic house in Maryland, United States

- U.S. National Register of Historic Places
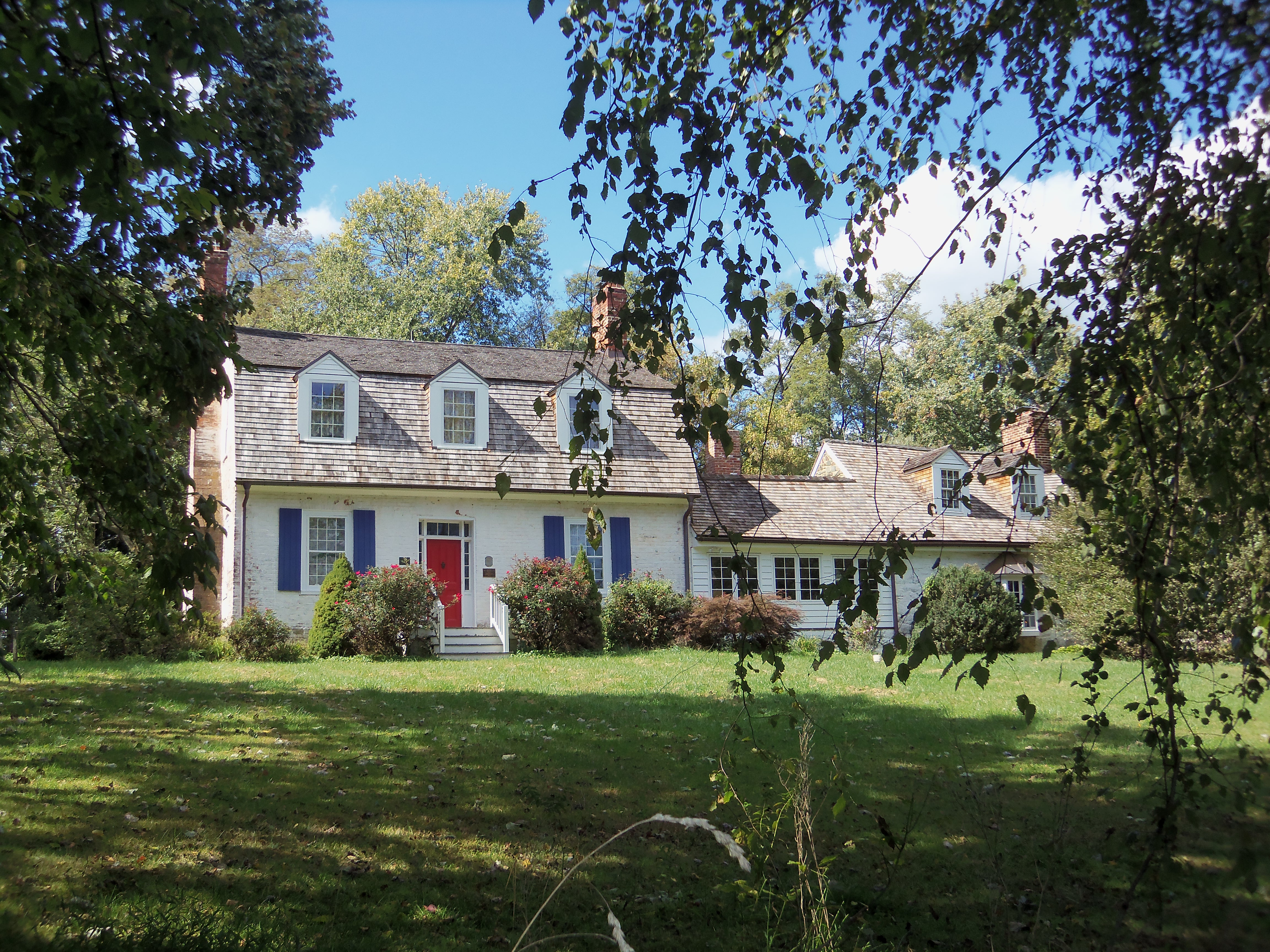
- September 2012

- Location within Maryland Location within the United States
- Location: 19000 Muncaster Road, Derwood, Maryland
- Coordinates: 39°10′3″N 77°7′8″W
- Area: 6.8 acres (2.8 ha)
- Architectural style: Greek Revival, Georgian, Federal
- NRHP reference No.: 88000267
- Added to NRHP: April 5, 1988

The Ridge is a historic home located at Derwood, Montgomery County, Maryland, United States. It is a 1 1/2-story Flemish bond brick house on a fieldstone foundation. The decorative detailing in the main house reflects Georgian, Federal, and Greek Revival influences. Also on the property is an 18th-century two-story log building. It was the home of Zadok Magruder and his descendants, until 1956.

The Ridge was listed on the National Register of Historic Places in 1988.
