= Presbury Meetinghouse =

Historic church in Maryland, United States

- U.S. National Register of Historic Places
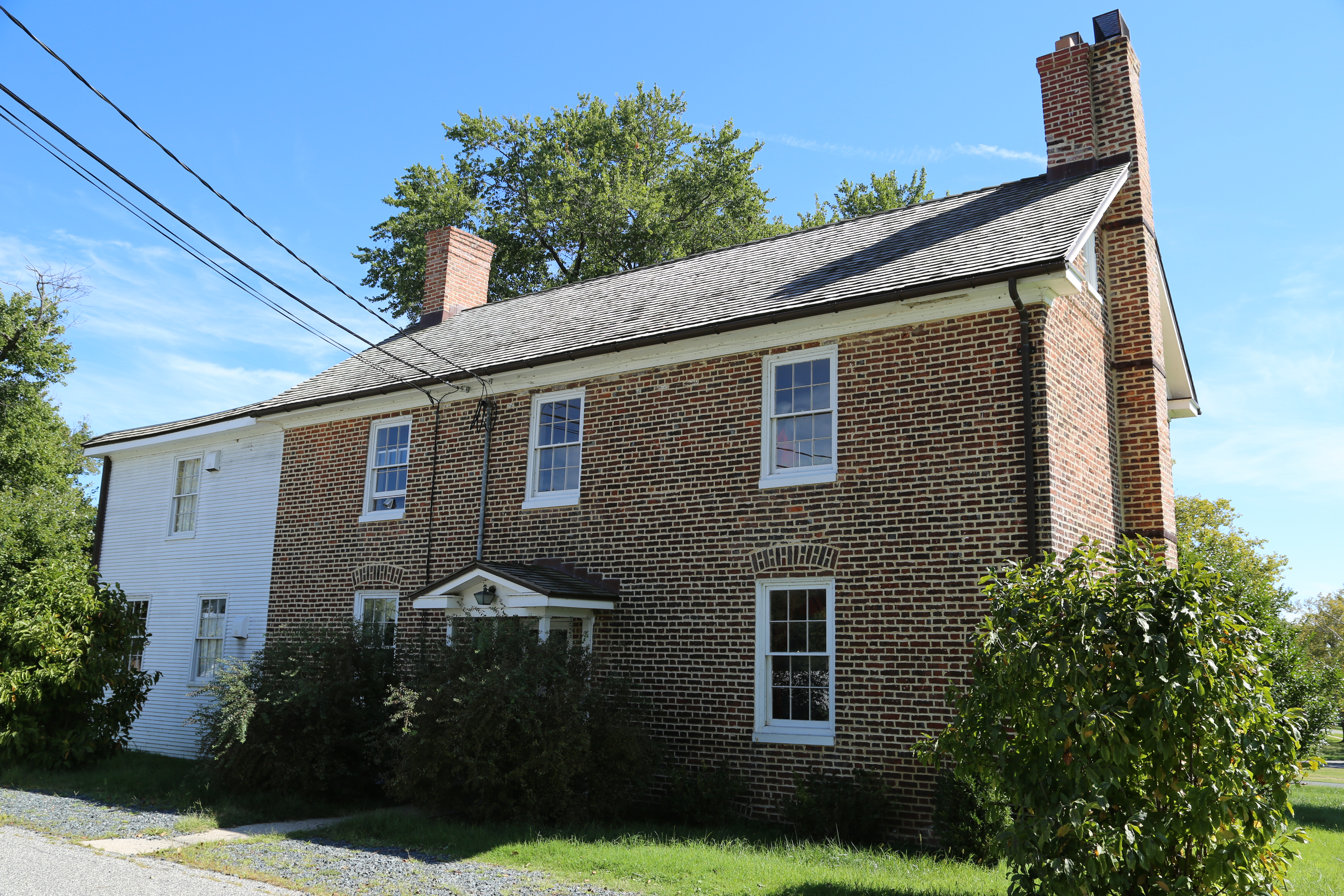
- Presbury Meetinghouse in 2014

- Location within Maryland Location within the United States
- Location: Austin and Parrish Rds., Aberdeen Proving Ground, Maryland
- Coordinates: 39°23′15″N 76°18′24″W
- Area: 0.3 acres (0.12 ha)
- Built: 1720
- NRHP reference No.: 74000955
- Added to NRHP: May 23, 1974

The Presbury Meetinghouse is a historic Methodist church located at Aberdeen Proving Ground, Harford County, Maryland, United States. The original portion of the building is a two-story brick structure and was built about 1720. It is approximately 40.5 feet by 20.25 feet. The building consists of a central hall with a room on either side on both floors. It is frequently mentioned in journals of early Methodist preachers and was the site of 14 visits for preaching and overnight rest by Bishop Francis Asbury between 1772 and 1777.

The Presbury Meetinghouse was listed on the National Register of Historic Places in 1974.
