= Rock United Presbyterian Church =

Historic church in Maryland, United States

- U.S. National Register of Historic Places
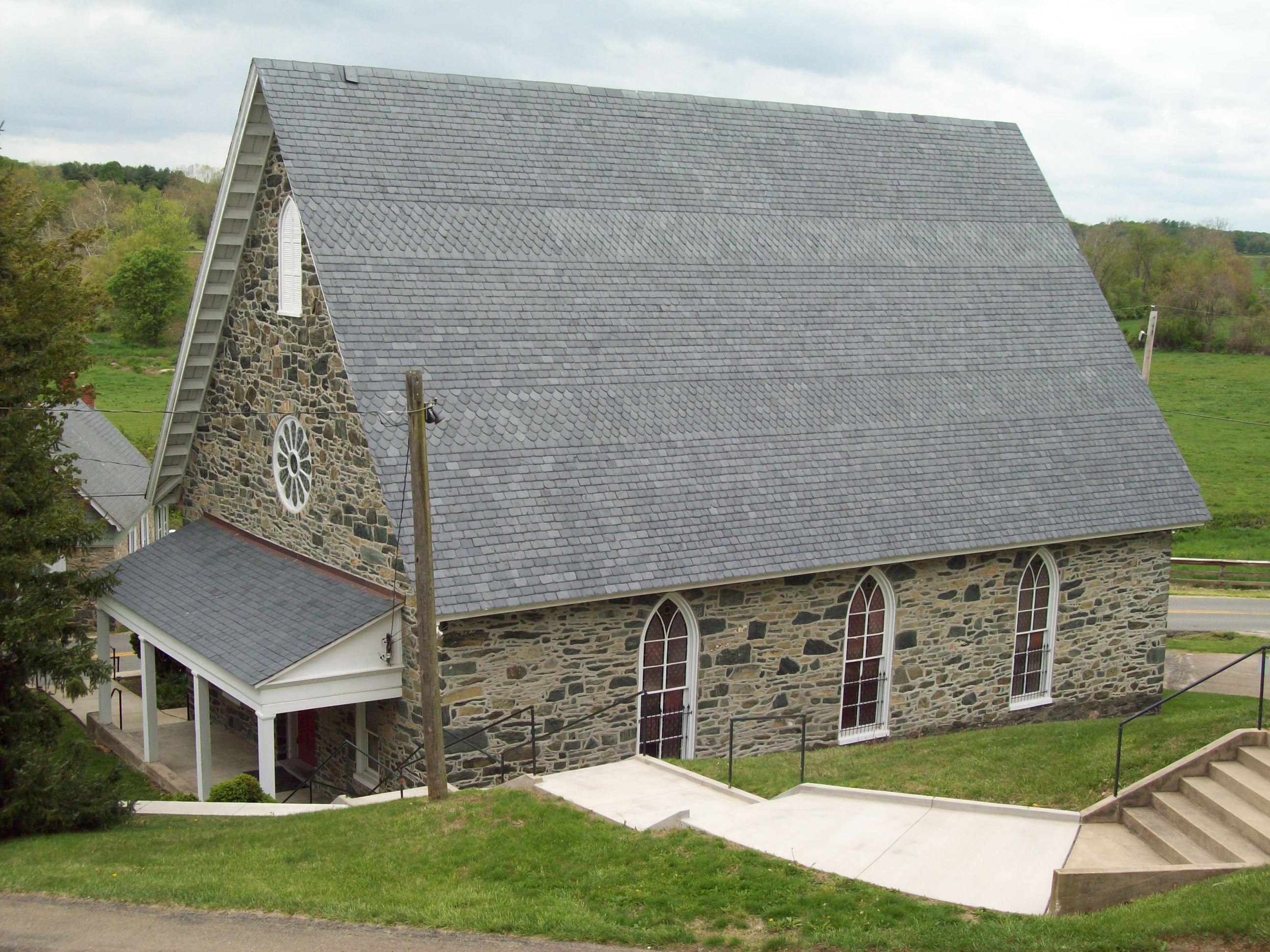
- Rock United Presbyterian Church, April 2010

- Location within Maryland Location within the United States
- Nearest city: Elkton, Maryland
- Coordinates: 39°42′7″N 75°53′9″W
- Area: 3 acres (1.2 ha)
- Built: 1761
- Architect: Walker & Gibson; Plack, W.L.
- Architectural style: Gothic
- NRHP reference No.: 83003776
- Added to NRHP: December 1, 1983

Rock United Presbyterian Church is a historic Presbyterian church located at Elkton, Cecil County, Maryland. It is a rectangular building of uncoursed rubble stone construction, three bays wide by three deep, with a steeply pitched slate-clad gable roof. It was originally constructed in 1761, and remodeled to its current Victorian Gothic influenced appearance in 1872 and 1900. Also on the property is a 1 1/2-story, stone Session House originally constructed in 1762 and a modern white stucco Church House constructed in 1953. The church is significant due to its association with the early Scotch-Irish immigrants to Maryland.

It was listed on the National Register of Historic Places in 1983.
