= Waterloo (Princess Anne, Maryland) =

Historic house in Maryland, United States

- U.S. National Register of Historic Places
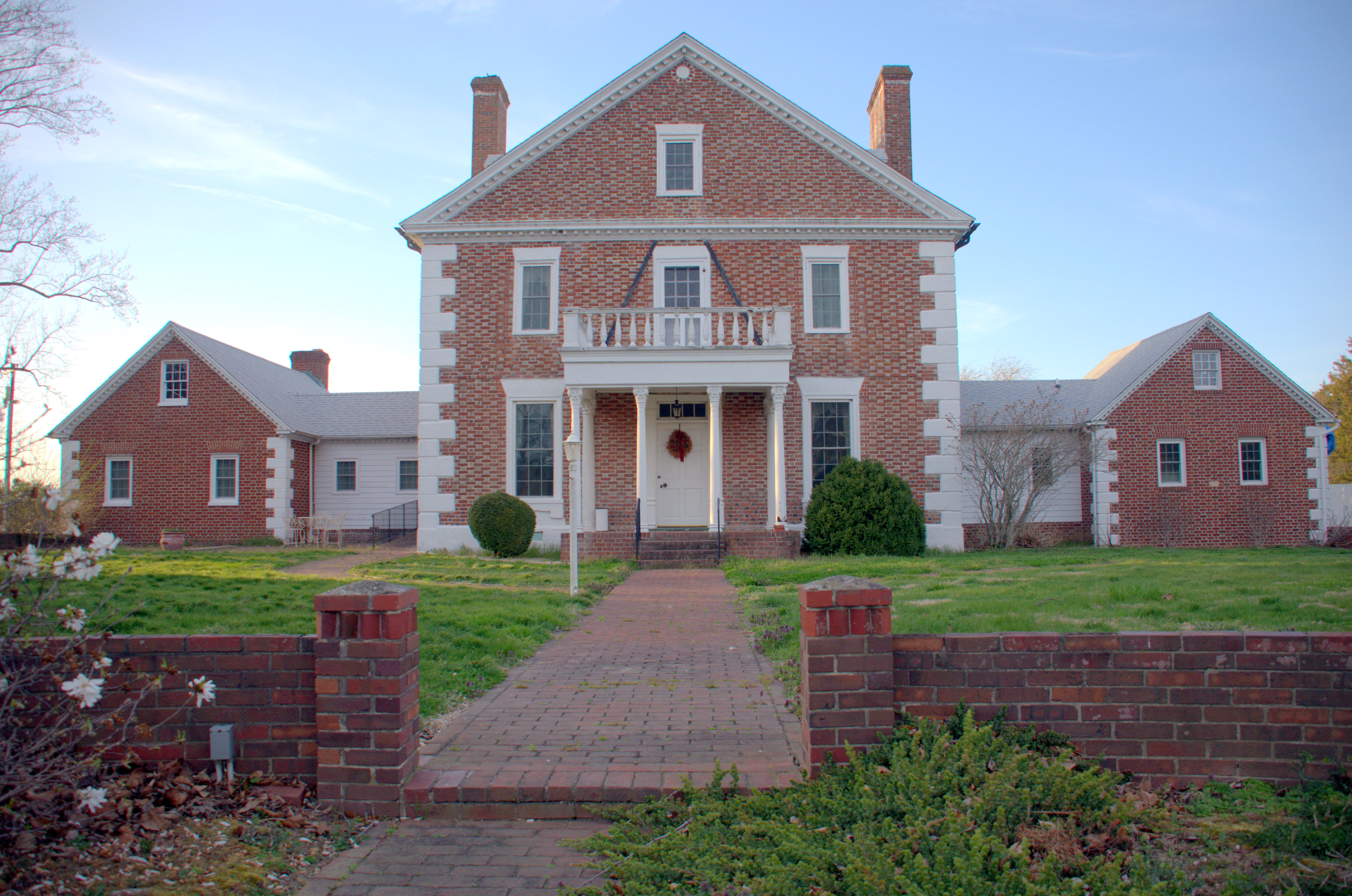

- Location within Maryland Location within the United States
- Location: Mt. Vernon Road (MD 362), Princess Anne, Maryland
- Coordinates: 38°13′35″N 75°45′9″W
- Area: 9 acres (3.6 ha)
- Built: 1750
- Architectural style: Georgian
- NRHP reference No.: 86000257
- Added to NRHP: February 13, 1986

Waterloo is a historic home located at Princess Anne, Somerset County, Maryland. It is a two-story four-room plan Flemish bond brick house, Georgian-period brick house built about 1750–1760 by Henry Waggaman. It features a Corinthian columned porch with a rooftop balustrade. Also on the property is a group of outbuildings including a doctor's office, a five-car garage, a frame caretaker's house, a small pump house, and the Waggaman-Riggin family cemetery. During the 19th century the property was owned by several locally prominent families until 1864, when the farm was purchased by the county for an almshouse. The county retained ownership of the property until 1948. The house was operated as a Bed & Breakfast for several years, but is now under private ownership.

It was listed on the National Register of Historic Places in 1986.
