= Michael Cresap House =

Historic house in Maryland, United States

- U.S. National Register of Historic Places
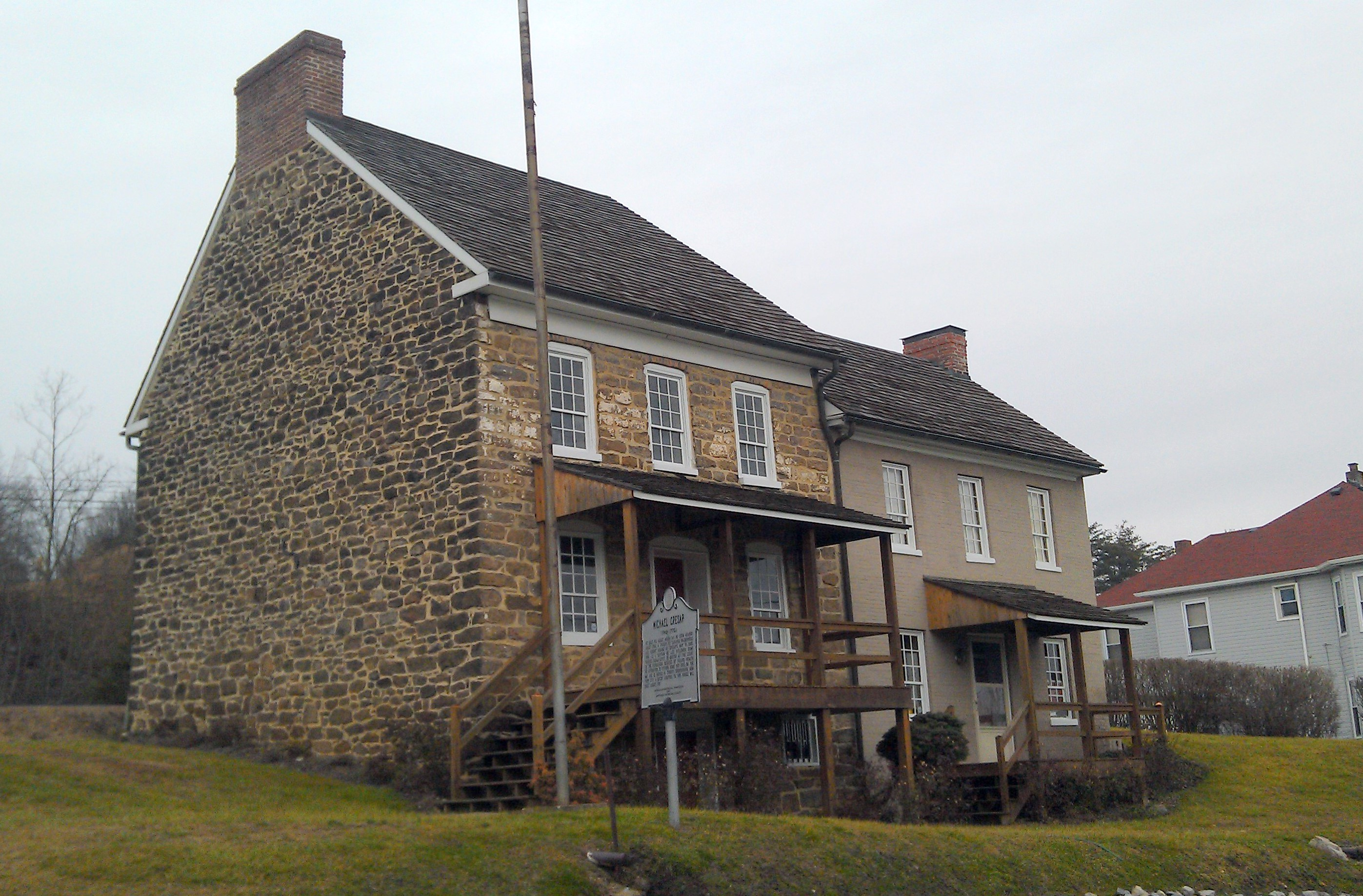
- Michael Cresap House, December 2011

- Location within Maryland Location within the United States
- Location: Main St. at Green Spring Rd., Oldtown, Maryland
- Coordinates: 39°32′30″N 78°36′42″W
- Area: less than one acre
- Built: 1764
- NRHP reference No.: 72000563
- Added to NRHP: April 14, 1972

Michael Cresap House is a historic home in Oldtown, Allegany County, Maryland, USA. It is a 2 1/2-story, two-part stone and brick house built about 1764. The house is associated with Captain Michael Cresap (1742–1775), a well known Ohio frontiersman.
