= Branton Manor =

Historic house in Maryland

- U.S. National Register of Historic Places
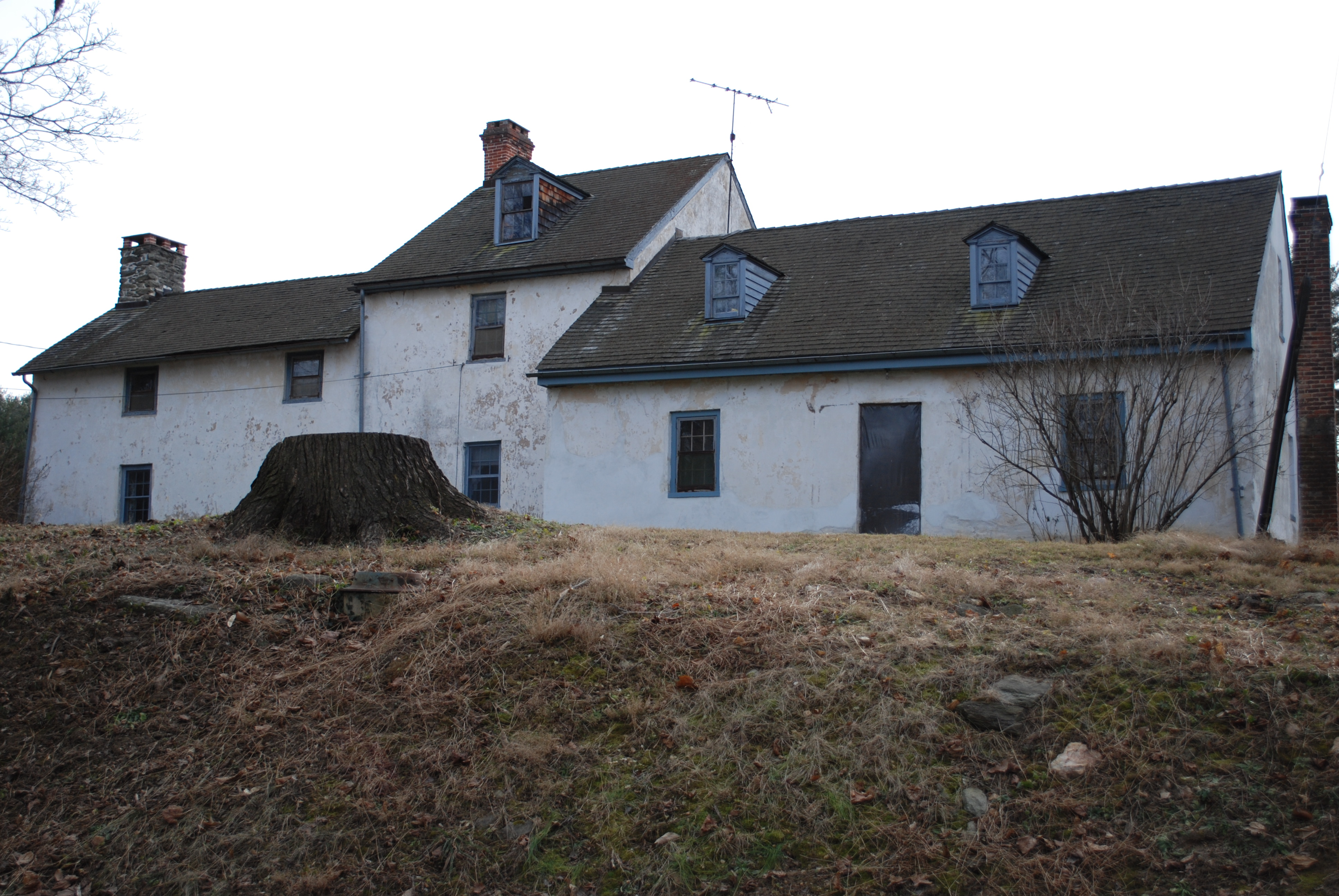
- Branton Manor, January 2010

- Location within Maryland Location within the United States
- Location: 2819 Old Liberty Road, Sykesville, Maryland
- Coordinates: 39°23′42″N 76°53′43″W
- Area: 13 acres (5.3 ha)
- Built: ca. 1766
- Architect: Snowden, John Baptiste
- Architectural style: Federal
- NRHP reference No.: 78001450
- Added to NRHP: August 18, 1978

Branton Manor is a historic home located at Sykesville, Carroll County, Maryland, United States. It is two stories with a gable roof and a large stone interior chimney at the east end. The overall exterior appearance of the house is quite mixed, with each section having a different style and roofline. The oldest section dates to approximately 1766.

Branton Manor was listed on the National Register of Historic Places in 1978.
