= Mitchell House (Fair Hill, Maryland) =

Historic home in Fair Hill, Cecil County, Maryland, US

- U.S. National Register of Historic Places
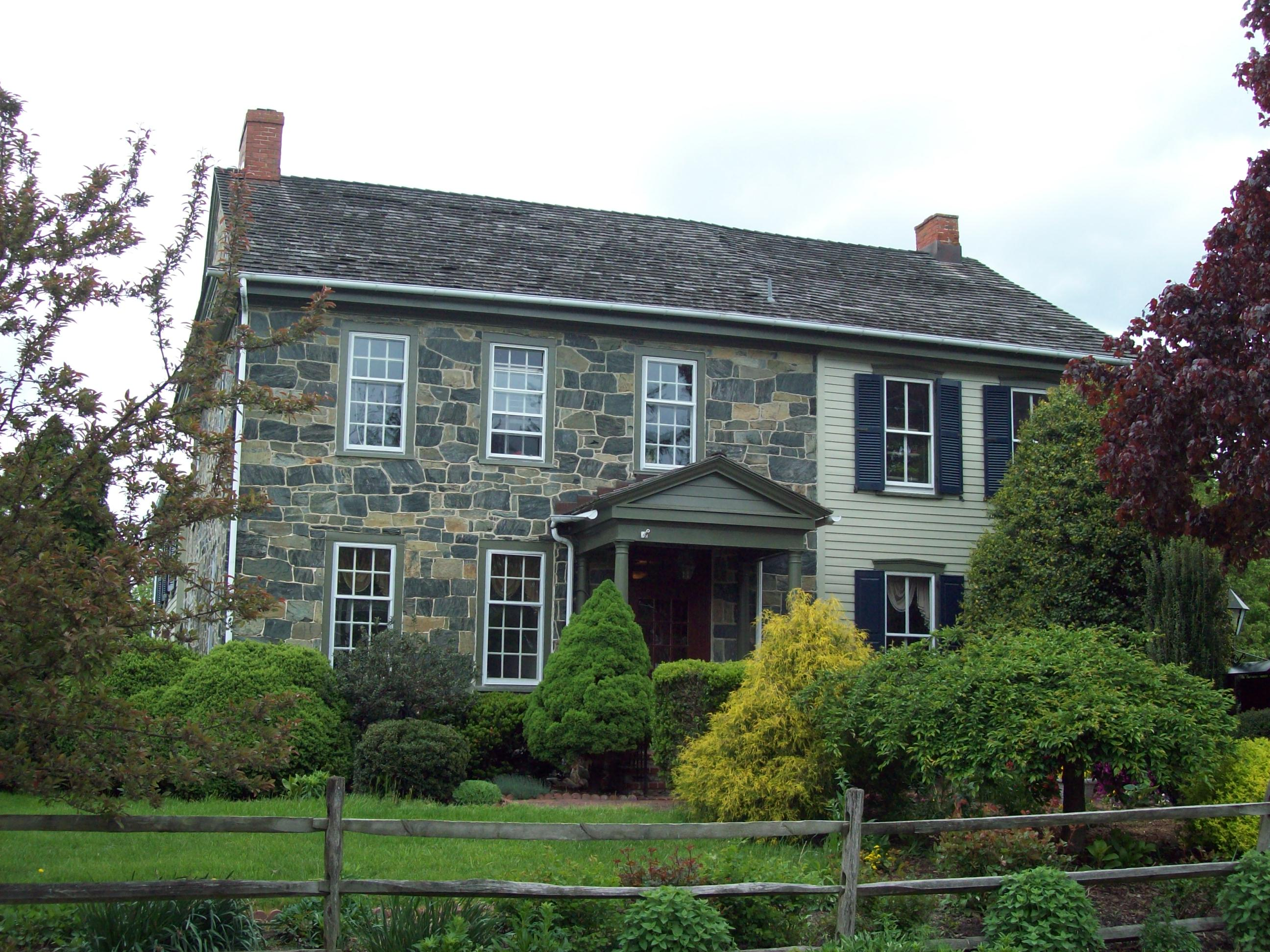
- Mitchell House, Fair Hill MD, April 2010

- Location within Maryland Location within the United States
- Location: 3370 Singerly Road (MD 213), Fair Hill, Maryland
- Coordinates: 39°42′8″N 75°52′6″W
- Area: 1 acre (0.40 ha)
- Built: 1764
- NRHP reference No.: 80001806
- Added to NRHP: April 11, 1980

Mitchell House is a historic home located at Fair Hill, Cecil County, Maryland, United States. It is a 2 1/2-story side-hall, double-parlor plan granite house with frame additions, built originally about 1764.

Mitchell House was listed on the National Register of Historic Places in 1980.
