= Perry Point Mansion House and Mill =

Historic house in Maryland, United States

- Stump Perry Point Mansion House and Mill
- U.S. National Register of Historic Places
- U.S. Historic district
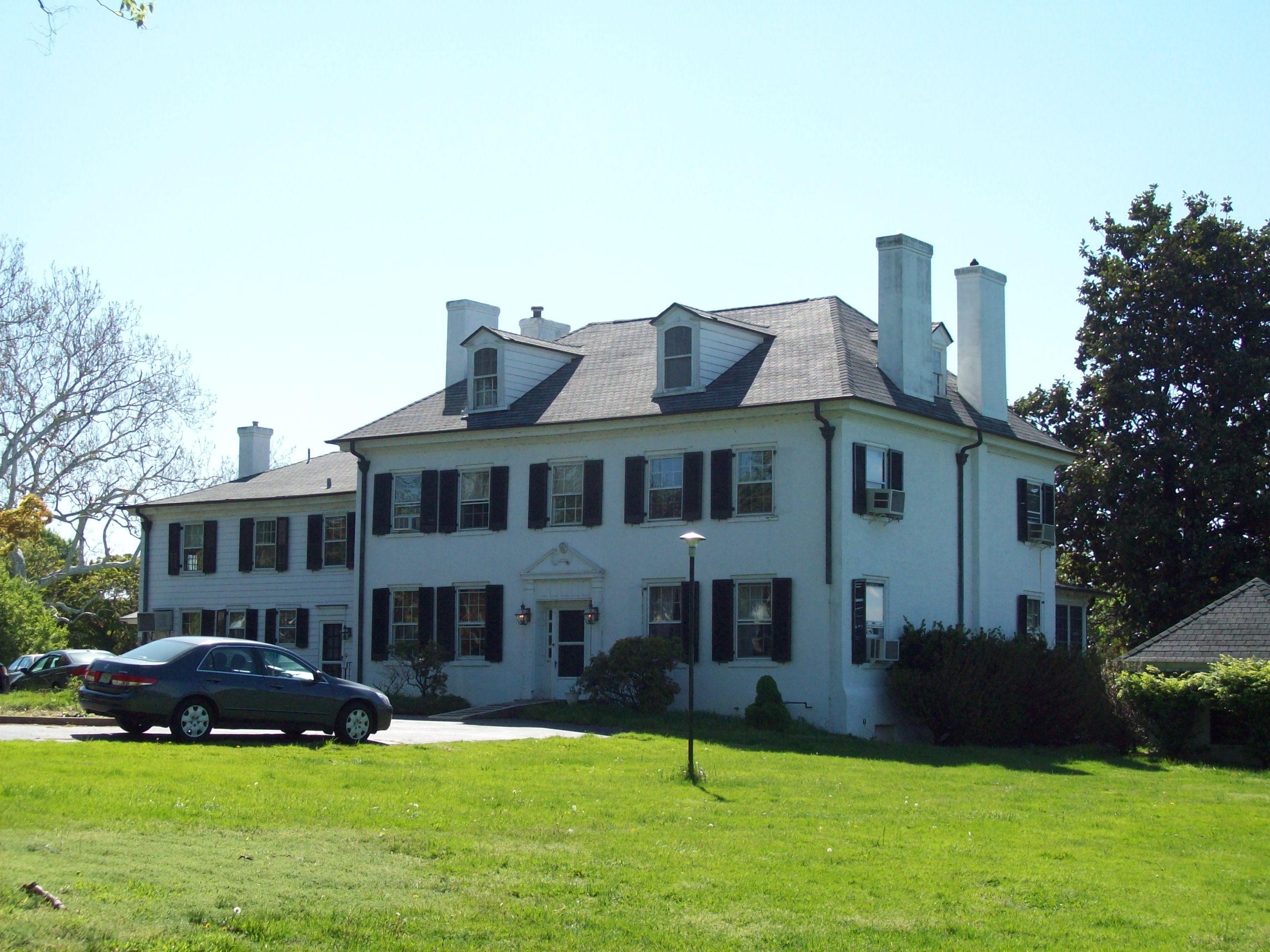
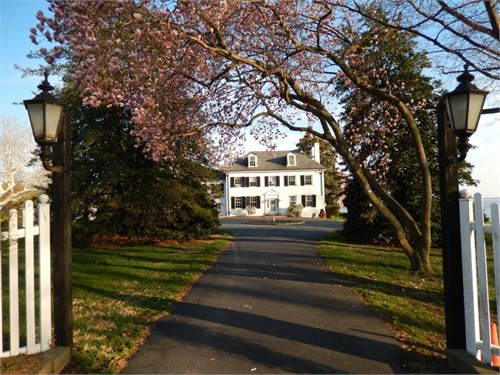
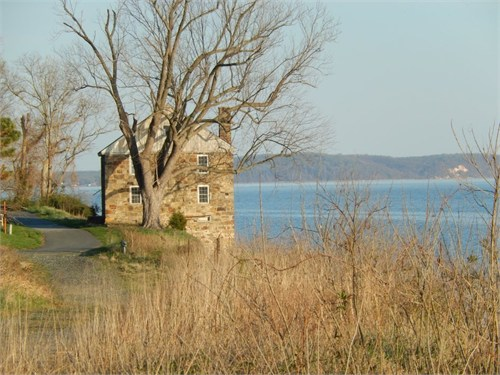
- Perry Point Mansion House, April 2010 Stump Family Mansion at Perry Point VA Hospital, Circa 1750 Stump Family Grist Mill at Perry Point VA Hospital, circa 1750. In 1975, the historic significance of the Mansion House and Grist Mill was recognized when the two structures were placed on the prestigious National Register of Historic Places by the U.S. Department of the Interior. These two buildings are the oldest known structures in the entire VA system.

- Location within Maryland Location within the United States
- Location: Veterans Administration Hospital grounds, Perryville, Maryland
- Coordinates: 39°32′58″N 76°4′15″W
- Area: 18 acres (7.3 ha)
- Built: 1750
- NRHP reference No.: 75000883
- Added to NRHP: July 2, 1975

The Perry Point Mansion House and grist Mill is a national historic district at Perry Point, Cecil County, Maryland, United States. It is a 2 1/2-story, center-passage brick house covered with gray stucco. The 30 foot by 20 foot, stone grist mill is built into a river bank and is two to three stories high. Both structures were built about 1750. Since the end of World War I when the property was acquired by the Federal government, Perry Point has been used as a rehabilitation center, a supply depot, and a psychiatric hospital, the latter use surviving and expanding to the present.

The Perry Point Mansion House and Mill was added to the National Register of Historic Places during 1975.

As of 1/1/2014 GSA as the agent for the VA is seeking a contractor to renovate the Mansion House and Grist Mill.

== Perry Point VA Medical Center - History ==
The first inhabitants of the Perry Point peninsula were the giant Susquehannock Indians. Many arrow heads and other relics of the tribe can still be found throughout the Point to attest to their long occupation of the area.

In approximately 1680, Lord Baltimore made a grant of 32,000 acres of land, designated as Susquehanna Manor, to his cousin George Talbot. A part of the grant included Susquehanna Point, the first name given to the peninsula. When Talbot was appointed Surveyor General of the grant to promote settlements on the land, he found that John Bateman was already established on the Point. Bateman had acquired the land in 1658 by a patent from Lord Baltimore.

In 1710, Captain Richard Perry acquired the land. Although the name “Perry Point” has been ascribed to Captain Richard Perry, the original grant to John Bateman refers to the tract as “Perry Point,” thus proving that the change from “Susquehanna Point” occurred earlier than 1658.

Between the time that John Bateman owned the property and when it was purchased by Captain Perry, the records do not show the names of the owners. Relatives of George Talbot resided for a time on the Point and may have owned it during this time period.

In 1728, Perry Point was owned by John Perry, George Perry, Anna Templer and Dorothy Barren. In 1729, Philip Thomas became the owner of the property, leaving it by will to his son Samuel Thomas in 1763, who in turn willed it to his son Richard Thomas in 1784. It was during the Thomas family ownership of the Point that the Mansion House was constructed around 1750 from bricks brought over as ballast on ships from England. The Grist Mill, which was built around the same period as the Mansion House, indicates that there was a settlement of considerable size on the Point.

In 1798, John Homes’ name appears on the records as the owner of Perry Point, followed by Littleton Gale in 1799 and George Gale on October 11, 1800. On October 13, 1800, John Stump purchased Perry Point, which presumably included an estate of approximately 1,800 acres. It was during the residence of John Stump that the British came up the Chesapeake Bay in the War of 1812, burned Havre de Grace, and continued their destruction as far up as Lapidum, where they burned a grist mill owned by John Stump's cousin. They returned down the river and marched to Principio, where they burned the Iron Works. For some unknown reason, they spared the Mansion House and Grist Mill at Perry Point.

John Stump died in 1828, leaving Perry Point to his son John Stump II. During the Civil War, the United States Government took over Perry Point for the first time, using it as a training station for cavalry mules. The officers in charge of the project used the Mansion House for their headquarters, sharing it for a time with the Stump family. When the situation became too strained for comfort, John Stump II moved his family to Harford County to live with his sister. Upon their return, they found the Mansion House badly abused and the farm sadly neglected, but many of the former slaves remained voluntarily as hired workers and the usual activities resumed.

In 1848, an agreement was drawn up between John Stump II and the promoters of the Philadelphia, Wilmington and Baltimore Railroad (a branch of the Pennsylvania system) for the right of way through the Stump farm. Due to great difficulties in the construction process, the road was not completed until about 1954.

In 1898, John Stump II died, leavening his estate to his 10 children: Mary Smith, Judge Frederick Stump, Henrietta Mitchell, Anna Webster, John Stump, Katherine Magraw, Dr. George M. Stump, Elizabeth Boswell, Alicia Stump and Judge Arthur H. Stump.

Soon after the United States entered World War I on April 6, 1917, several representatives of the U.S. Government were sent out from Washington to inspect a number of locations for an ammonium nitrate plan. Because of its favorable location close to transportation facilities, Perry Point was selected. In February 1918, the U.S. Government purchased the 516-acre estate for $150,000 from the Stump heirs.

The U.S. Government leased the Point to the Atlas Powder Company, which constructed a large ammonium nitrate plant and village of 300 homes to house its employees. The ground was broken for the construction of the plan on March 3, 1918. After only 124 days of constructions, the first unit of the plant started turning out ammonium nitrate on July 5, 1918, for use in high explosives. Soon after the completion of the plant and its village, the Armistice was signed and the manufacture of ammonium nitrate was no longer necessary.

By Act of Congress, Perry Point was turned over to the U.S. Public Health Service on March 3, 1919, for the hospitalization of War Risk beneficiaries and as a storage depot for surplus hospital supplies for the Army. The first hospital building, a two-story structure located in the village, was converted to accommodate 75 patients.

When the U.S. Public Health Service opened at Perry Point, the facility functioned as a general hospital that provided care for patients with various disabilities. In 1920, the U.S. Public Health Hospital in Cap May, New Jersey closed, the patients were transferred to Perry Point and four more of the buildings in the village were converted for hospital use. It was at this time that Perry Point became a hospital that focused on neuro-psychiatric care.

The U.S. Veterans’ Bureau took over Perry Point on May 1, 1922. That year the first permanent buildings, the five circle wards, were built. In 1923, the patient population at Perry Point grew substantially after several other hospital facilities closed and transferred their patients and staff to the facility. All activities on the campus were divided into four departments: Hospitalization, Supplies, Utilities and Rehabilitation.

In 1923, officials at Perry Point decided to adopt the name “Federal Park” to indicate government ownership and operation. Representatives of the Stump family and other leading families in Cecil County petitioned the authorities in Washington, D.C., to restore the original name of the campus due to its historic significance. On June 30, 1924, the Government agreed to the change and “Federal Park” ceased to be and “Perry Point” came into its own again.

On May 25, 1925, five additional hospital wards and a recreation building were completed to accommodate the additional patient population. In the years that followed, many additional hospital and administrative buildings were constructed throughout the campus to meet the needs of Perry Point's growing patient population. The Veterans Administration actually came into being in 1930 when President Hoover signed an Executive Order establishing the agency.

On October 30, 1989, ground was broken for a new clinical addition at Perry Point that was constructed to provide primary care and specialty outpatient services. The new outpatient care facility, which is attached to building 23H, was designed and constructed to better meet the needs of Veterans by offering the latest medical technology, expanded clinical space and comfortable waiting areas and exam rooms.

In October 1995, the Perry Point VA Medical Center integrated under a single management structure with the Baltimore and Fort Howard VA Medical Centers and the Baltimore VA Rehabilitation & Extended Care Center to form the VA Maryland Health Care System. On June 20, 2000, the Secretary of Veterans Affairs approved the plans to change the mission of the Fort Howard VA Medical Center. The mission change was requested to address the numerous structural deficiencies within the facility's main hospital building, as well as the continuing shift nationally from inpatient to outpatient care. The plans for the approved mission change included shifting inpatient programs and administrative functions from Fort Howard to other VA shifting inpatient programs and administrative functions from Fort Howard to other VA Maryland Health Care System facilities. The first phase of the mission change was completed in September 2002, with the relocation of Fort Howard's inpatient programs and administrative functions to the Baltimore VA Rehabilitation & Extended Care Center and the Perry Point VA Medical Center.

On April 7, 1998, a new inpatient mental health care building was dedicated at Perry Point. The new facility (building 364), which was Perry Point's first new inpatient building constructed in over 50 years, was built to offer specialized treatment programs, rehabilitation services and enhanced patient privacy for Veterans in a comfortable, state-of-the-art setting.

To better serve the needs of outpatients requiring mental health care services, a new 5,600 square foot Partial Hospitalization Program replacement building was constructed at Perry Point and dedicated on September 20, 2004. This new facility, which is attached to the outpatient mental health clinic (Building 80H), provides a structured treatment program to assist Veteran patients transition back into the community and to prevent future hospitalization. The new facility is a replacement for the old Day Treatment Center (Building 10H), which was originally constructed in 1924.

Today, the Perry Point VA Medical Center has been serving the health care needs of U.S. Veterans for more than 80 years. There are currently over 85 buildings dispersed throughout the 397-acre campus, with several of the buildings constructed by the Atlas Powder Company still in active use.

In 1975, the historic significance of the Mansion House and Grist Mill was recognized when the two structures were placed on the prestigious National Register of Historic Places by the U.S. Department of the Interior. These two buildings are the oldest known structures in the entire VA system.
