= Mary's Mount =

Historic house in Maryland, United States

- U.S. National Register of Historic Places
- Location within Maryland Location within the United States
- Location: Northeast of Harwood off Mill Swamp Rd., Harwood, Maryland
- Coordinates: 38°52′27″N 76°35′8″W
- Built: 1742
- NRHP reference No.: 69000064
- Added to NRHP: May 15, 1969

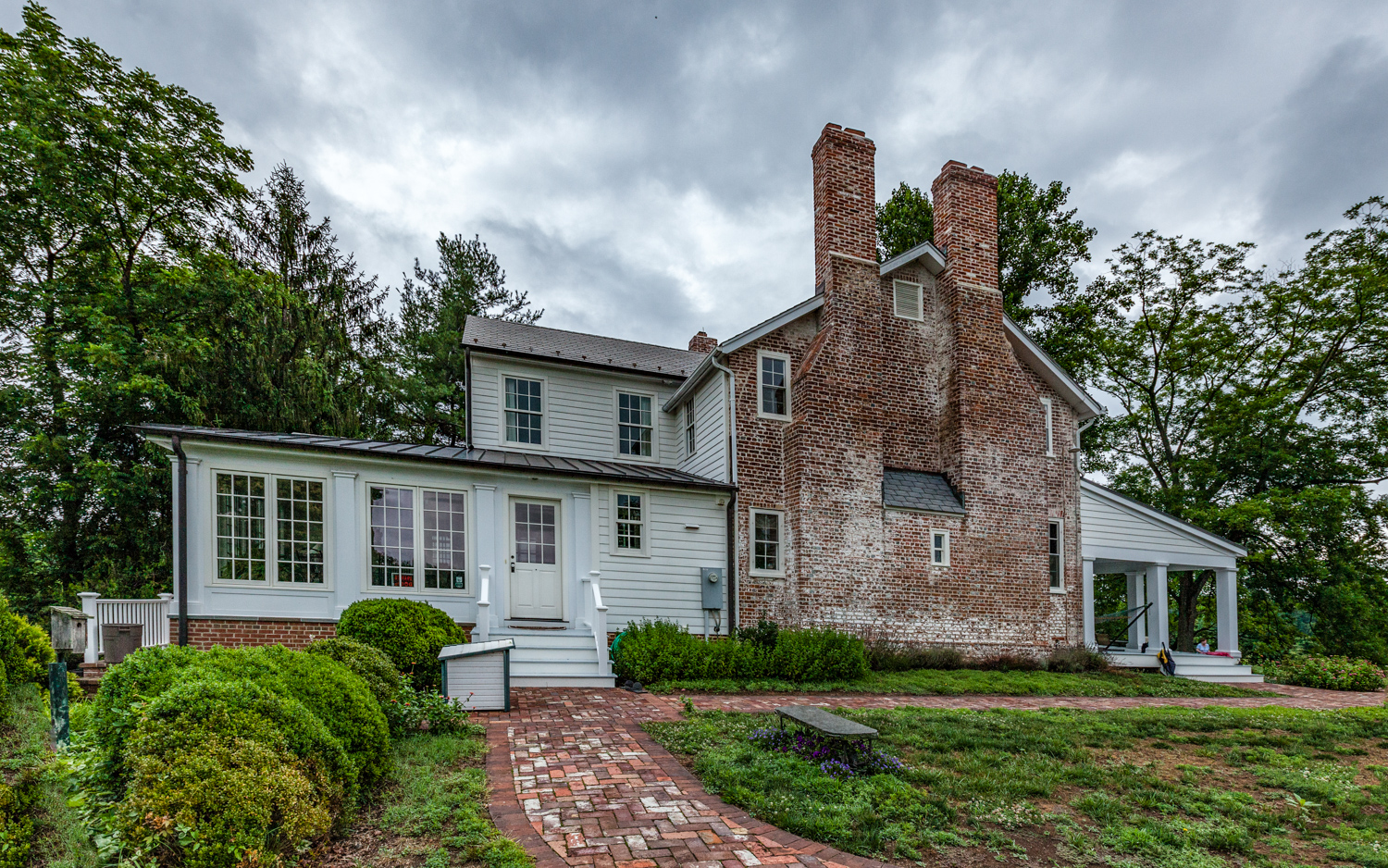
Mary's Mount, July 2017

Mary's Mount is a historic home at Harwood, Anne Arundel County, Maryland, United States. The earliest portion of Mary's Mount was built in 1771 for Col. Richard Harwood as a 1 1/2-story gambrel roof structure. The Bird family was to take possession of this property from 1820 to 1965. Jacob Wheeler Bird enlarged the house to its present two-story height in the early 19th century. The enlargements included two northern additions, each section of which is lower than its neighbor to the south, creating a "telescope" effect.

Mary's Mount was listed on the National Register of Historic Places in 1969.

== Gallery ==
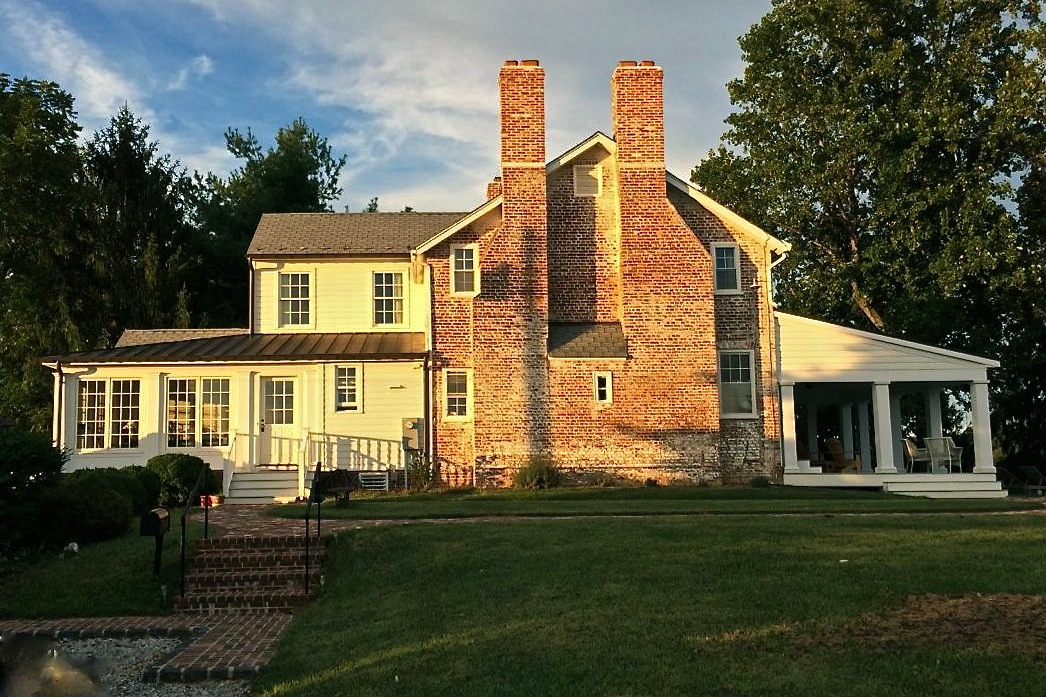
Mary's Mount, September 14, 2014

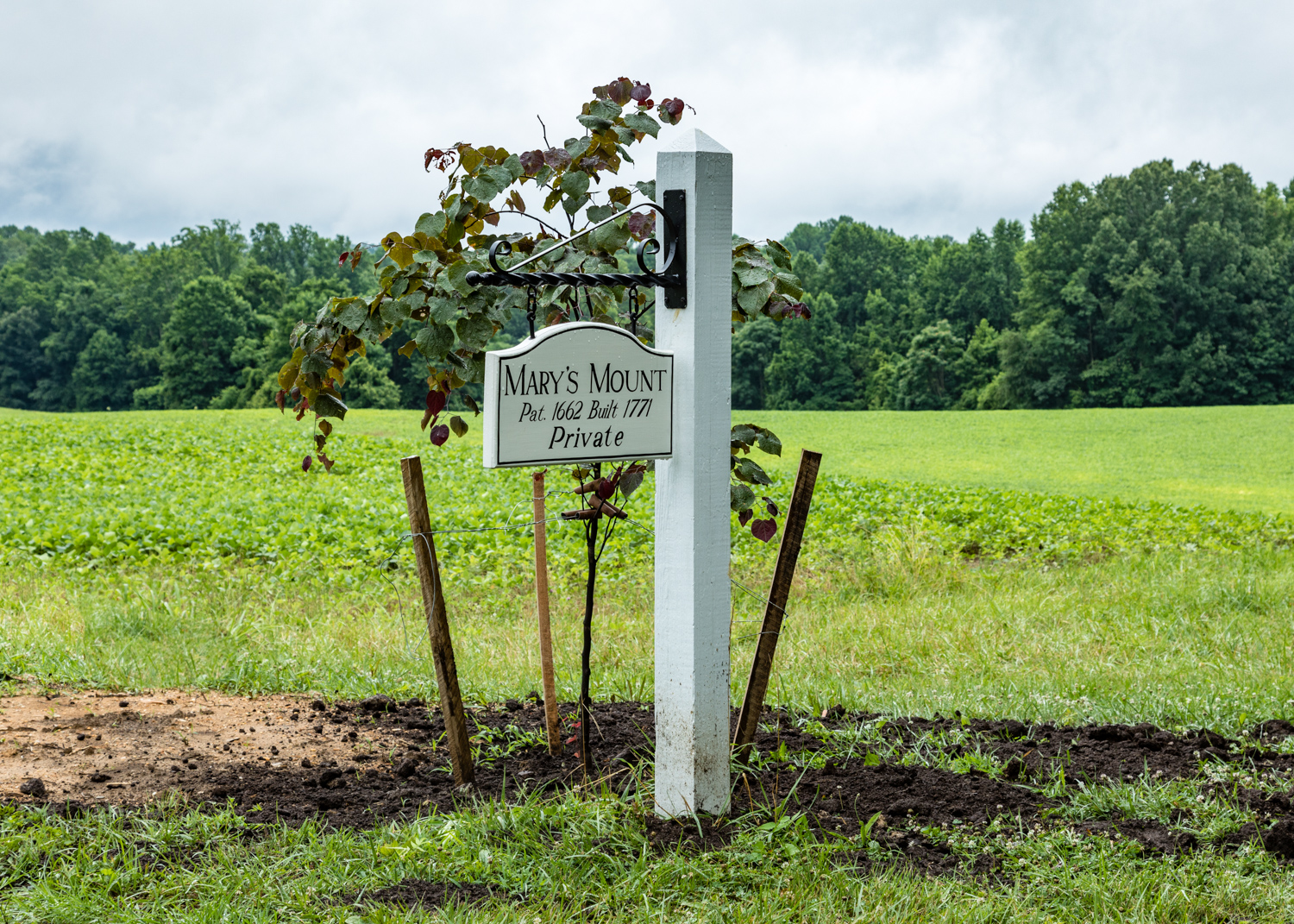
Mary's Mount, July 2017

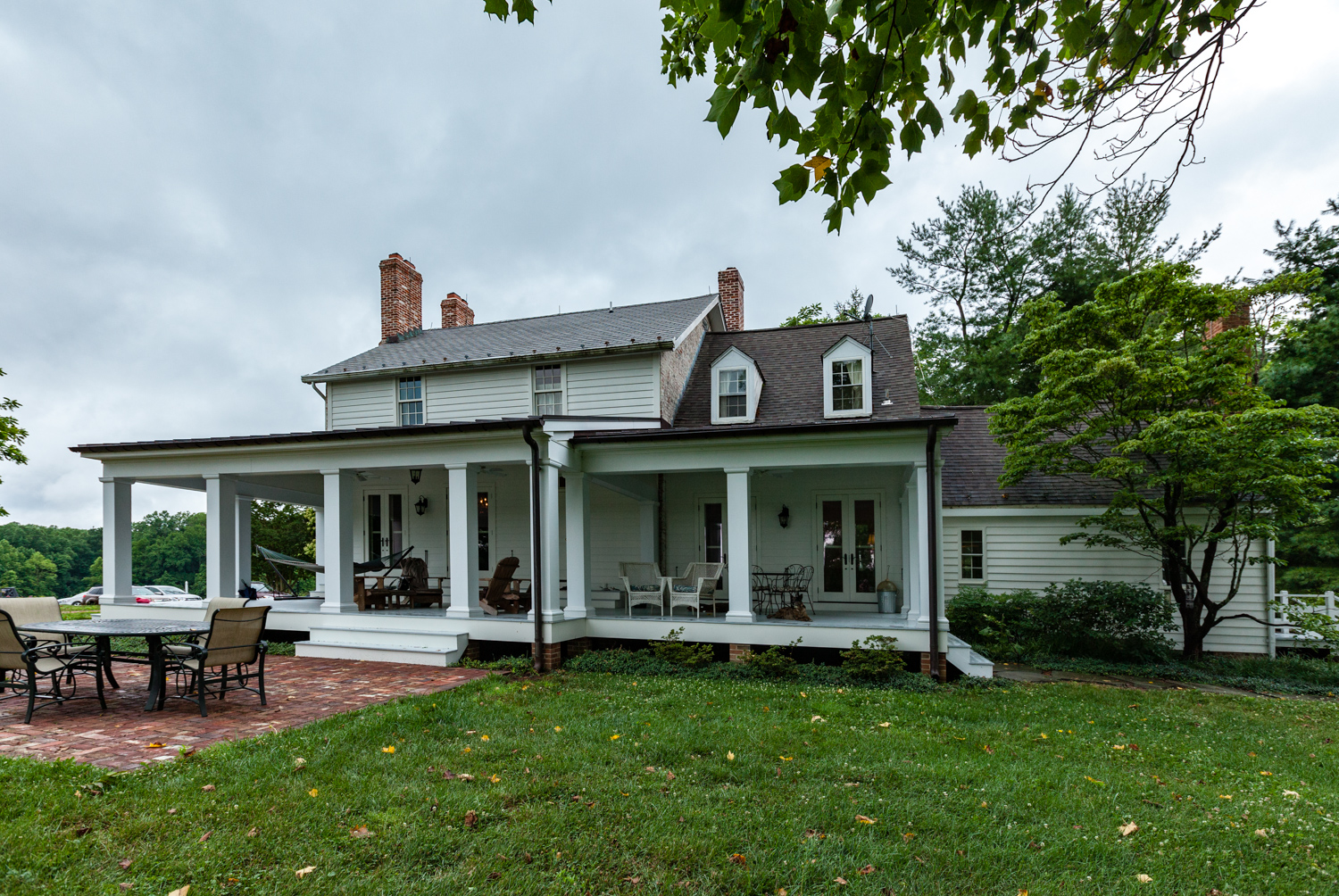
Mary's Mount, July 2017

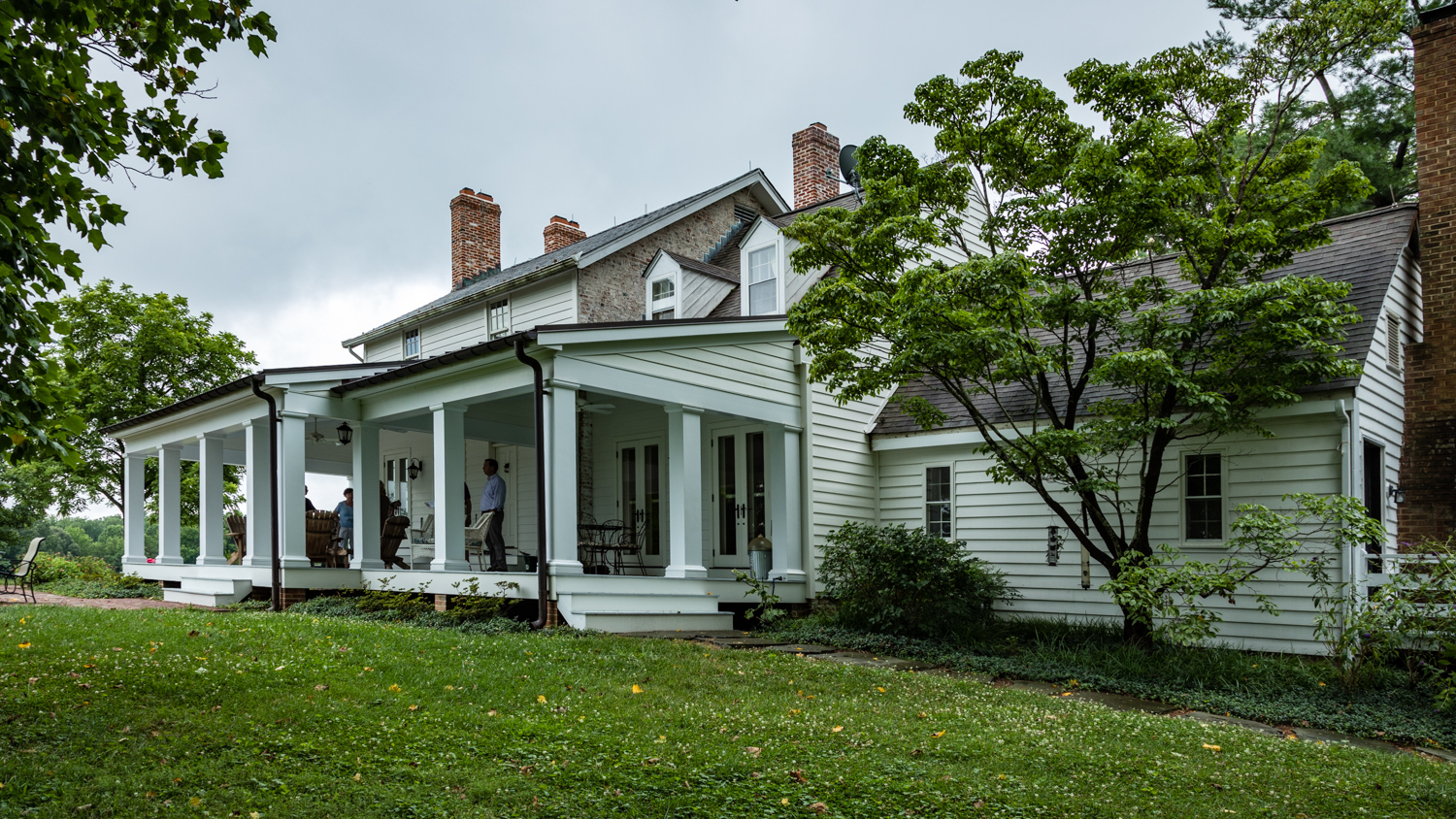
Mary's Mount, July 2017
