= Patuxent, Maryland =

Unincorporated community in Maryland, United States

- Unincorporated community
- Location within the state of Maryland Patuxent (the United States)
- Coordinates: 38°32′21″N 76°44′55″W
- Country: United States
- State: Maryland
- County: Charles
- Time zone: UTC-5 (Eastern (EST))
  - Summer (DST): UTC-4 (EDT)

Patuxent is an unincorporated community in Charles County, Maryland, United States. Maxwell Hall was listed on the National Register of Historic Places in 1974. The name Patuxent is the name attributed to all five rivers found by the explores—it literally means "many rivers."
