= Howard's Inheritance =

Historic house in Maryland, United States

- U.S. National Register of Historic Places
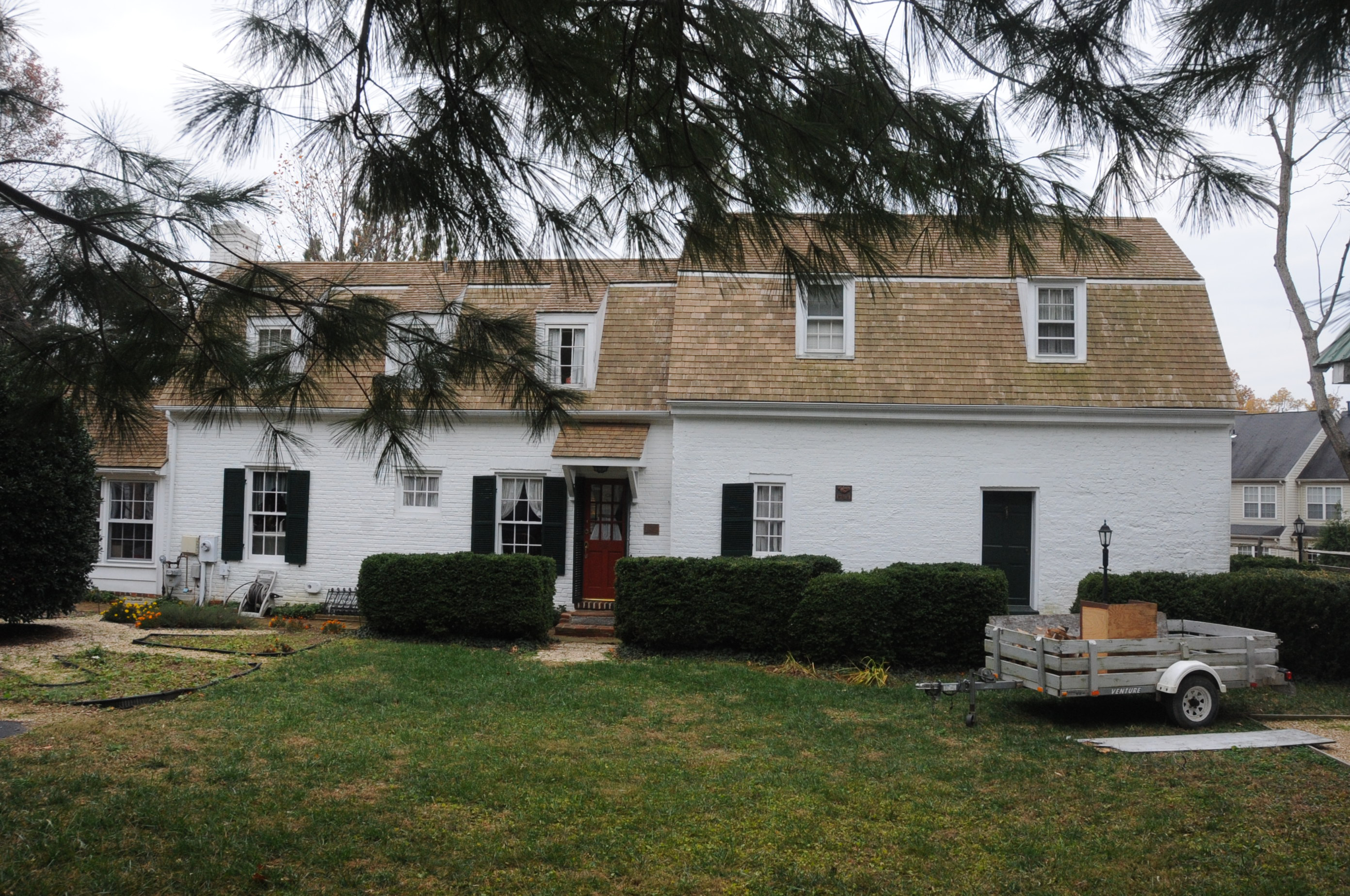

- Location within Maryland Location within the United States
- Nearest city: 721 Howard's Loop, Annapolis, Maryland
- Coordinates: 38°59′44″N 76°31′20″W
- Built: 1760
- Architectural style: Colonial Revival, Federal
- NRHP reference No.: 98000887
- Added to NRHP: July 23, 1998

Howard's Inheritance is a historic home near Annapolis, Anne Arundel County, Maryland, United States. It is a 1 1/2-story gambrel-roofed brick house with a hall-parlor plan. The building appears to have been constructed as early as 1760, with interior finishes renewed about 1840. Also on the property is a 19th-century frame corn crib.

Howard's Inheritance was listed on the National Register of Historic Places in 1998.
