= Rosehill (Gambrills, Maryland) =

Historic house in Maryland, United States

- U.S. National Register of Historic Places
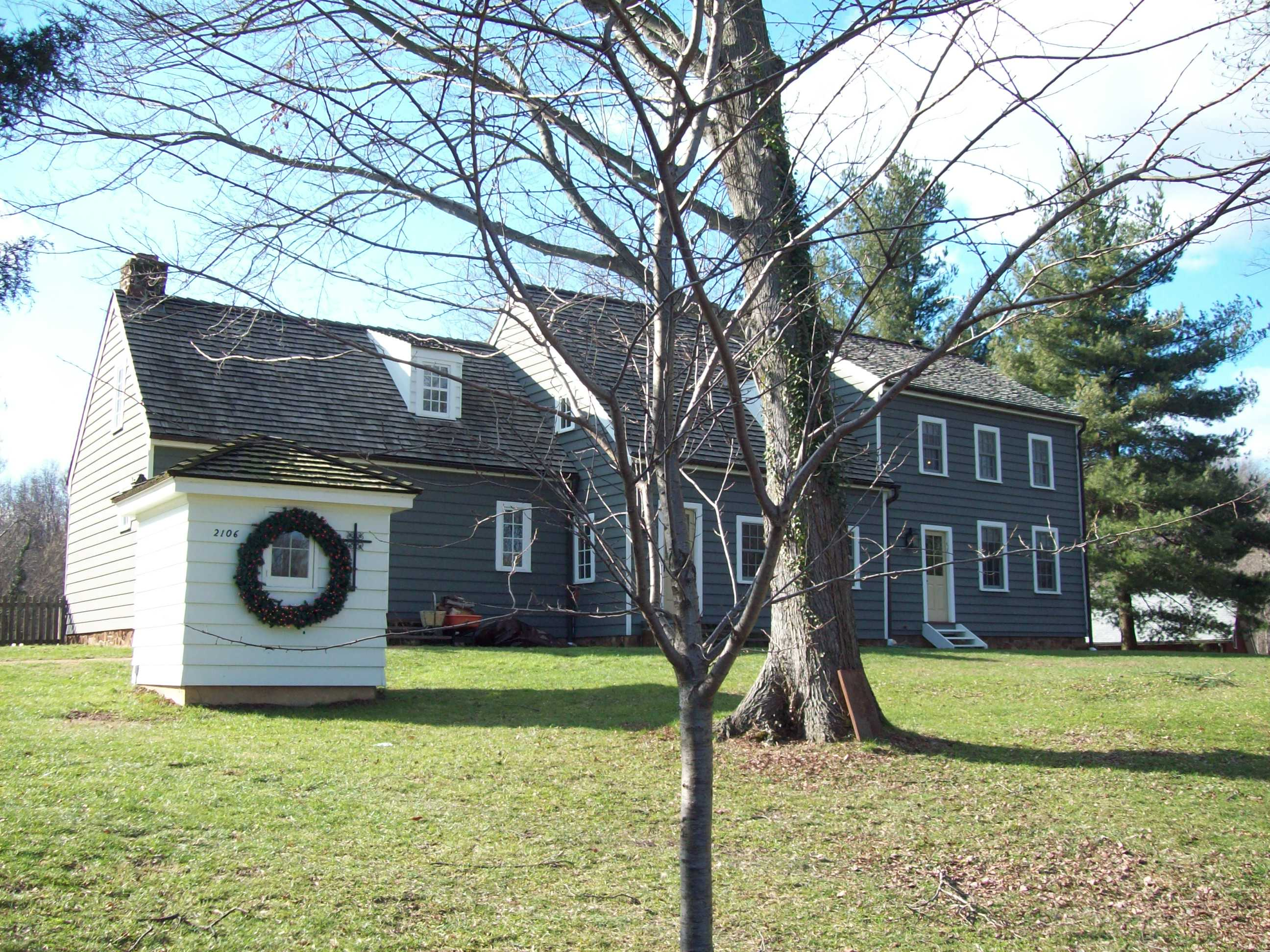
- Rosehill, December 2009

- Location within Maryland Location within the United States
- Nearest city: Gambrills, Maryland
- Coordinates: 38°59′0″N 76°39′30″W
- Area: 17.7 acres (7.2 ha)
- Built: 1750
- NRHP reference No.: 87000852
- Added to NRHP: May 29, 1987

Rosehill is a historic home and property at Gambrills, Anne Arundel County, Maryland. The property consists of 17 acres (69,000 m^{2}) of partially wooded and cleared land on which are located a dwelling and six outbuildings. The dwelling displays a complex construction evolution originating from a mid-18th-century frame, 1 1/2-story double-pile plan house with an unusual short side passage. This is believed to be the first documented example of this form in the Chesapeake Bay region. The six outbuildings include an early-19th-century frame corn house, a documented 1821 frame tobacco barn, a log outbuilding, a late-19th-century stable, and a late-19th- or early-20th-century pumphouse. The Hopkins family owned the property for 173 years, from 1799 until 1972.

It was listed on the National Register of Historic Places in 1987.
