= Port Tobacco Historic District =

Historic district in Maryland, United States

- U.S. National Register of Historic Places
- U.S. Historic district
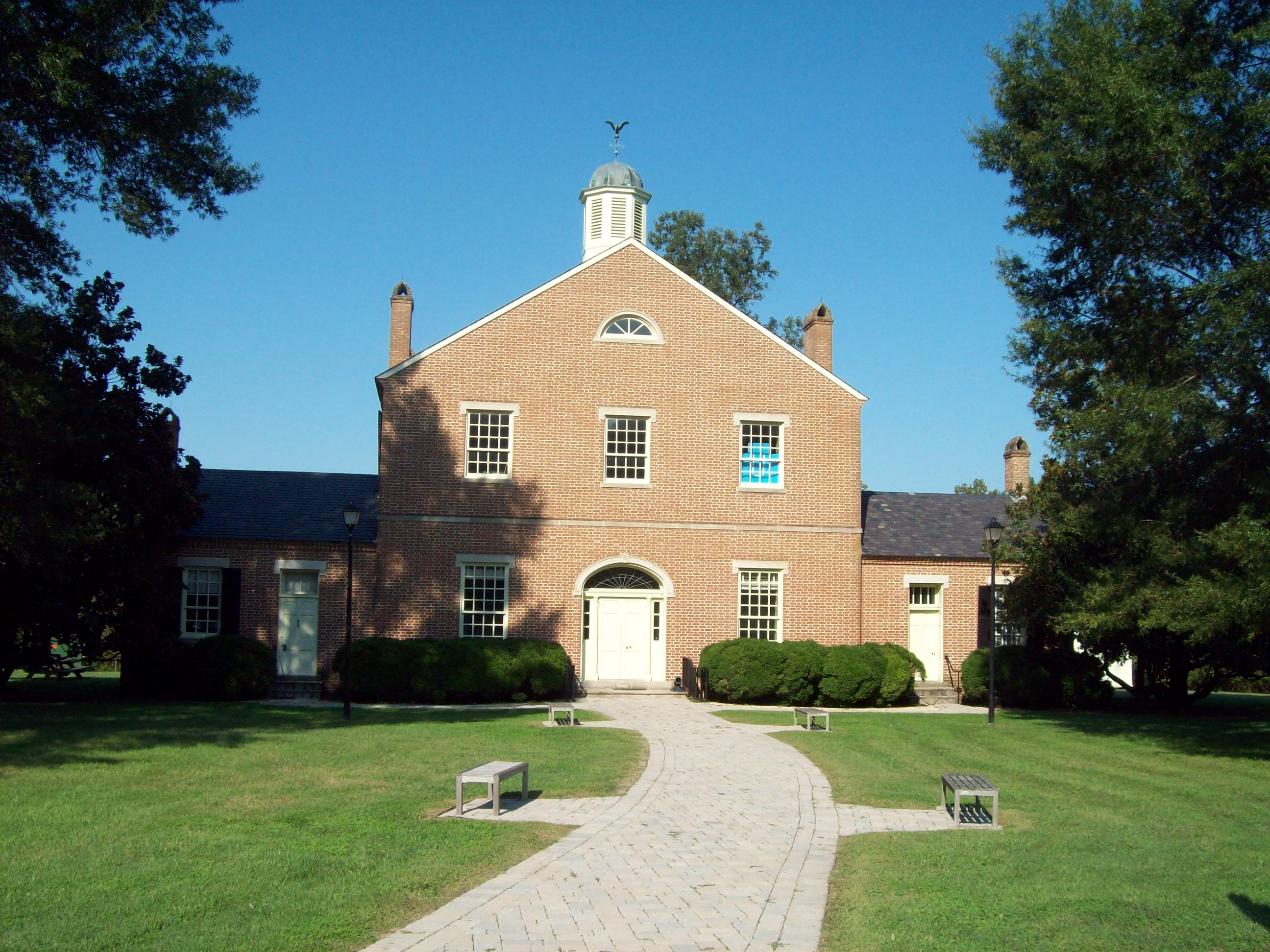
- Port Tobacco Courthouse, September 2009

- Location within Maryland Location within the United States
- Location: Off MD 6, Port Tobacco, Maryland
- Coordinates: 38°30′45″N 77°1′7″W
- Built: 1684
- NRHP reference No.: 79003911
- Added to NRHP: August 4, 1989

Port Tobacco Historic District is a national historic district in Port Tobacco, Charles County, Maryland. It is located along both sides of Chapel Point Road immediately south of Maryland Route 6. It includes five surviving 18th- and 19th-century buildings; four have been privately restored as single-family residences. The fifth was renovated for use as a children's museum. Two of these buildings, Chimney House and Stagg Hall (listed separately), are immediately adjacent to one another at one corner of the town square.

In 1972, the 1821–1892 courthouse was reconstructed on its original site for use as a museum of local history. Other buildings include several private residences built after 1940. A brick wellhouse was erected in 1958 to commemorate the county's tercentenary. Approximately 90 percent of the historic features of the community constitute archeological sites, nearly all of which have remained undisturbed by later development.

It was added to the National Register of Historic Places in 1989.

== Gallery ==
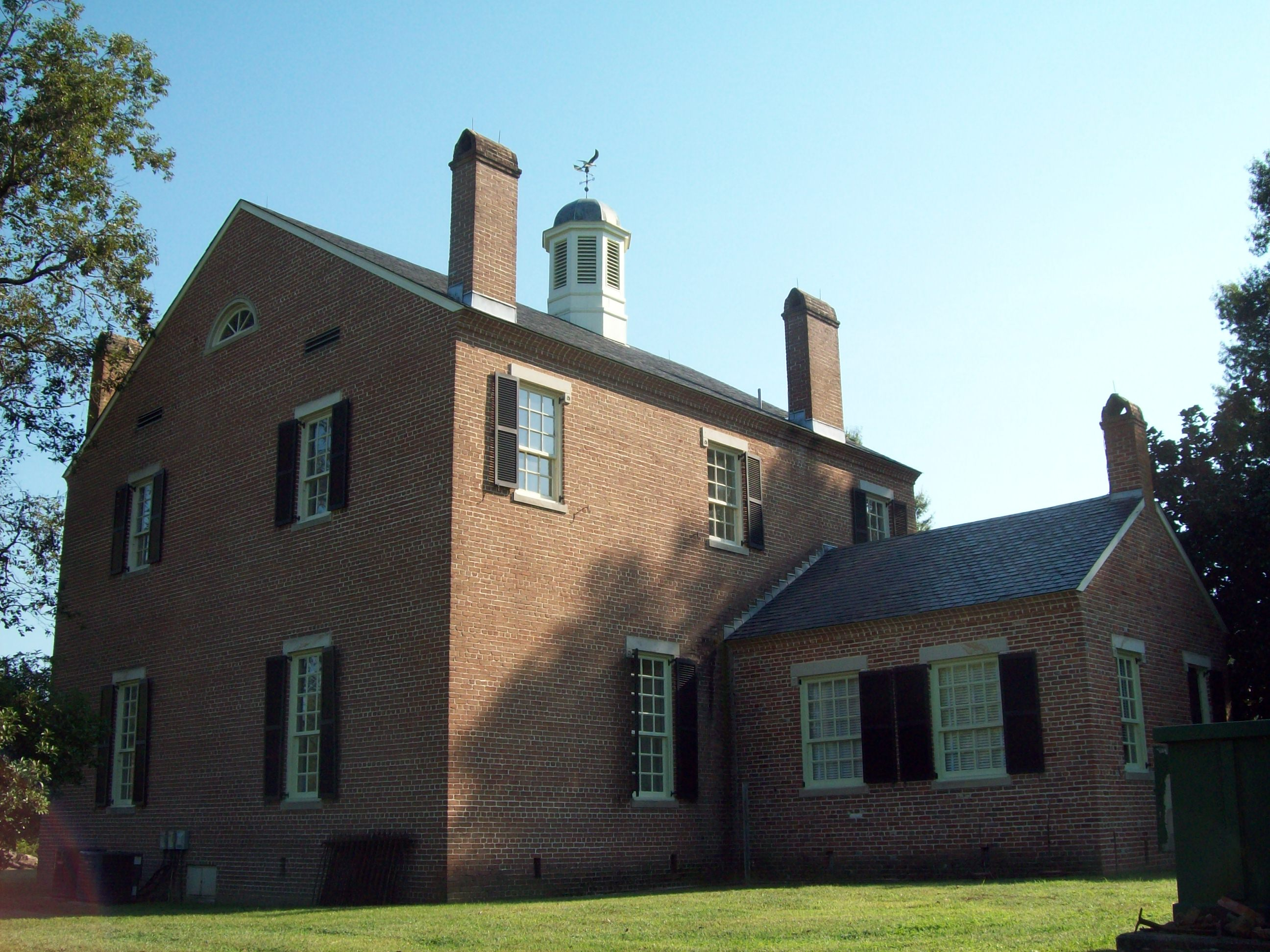
Port Tobacco Courthouse, Rear View, September 2009

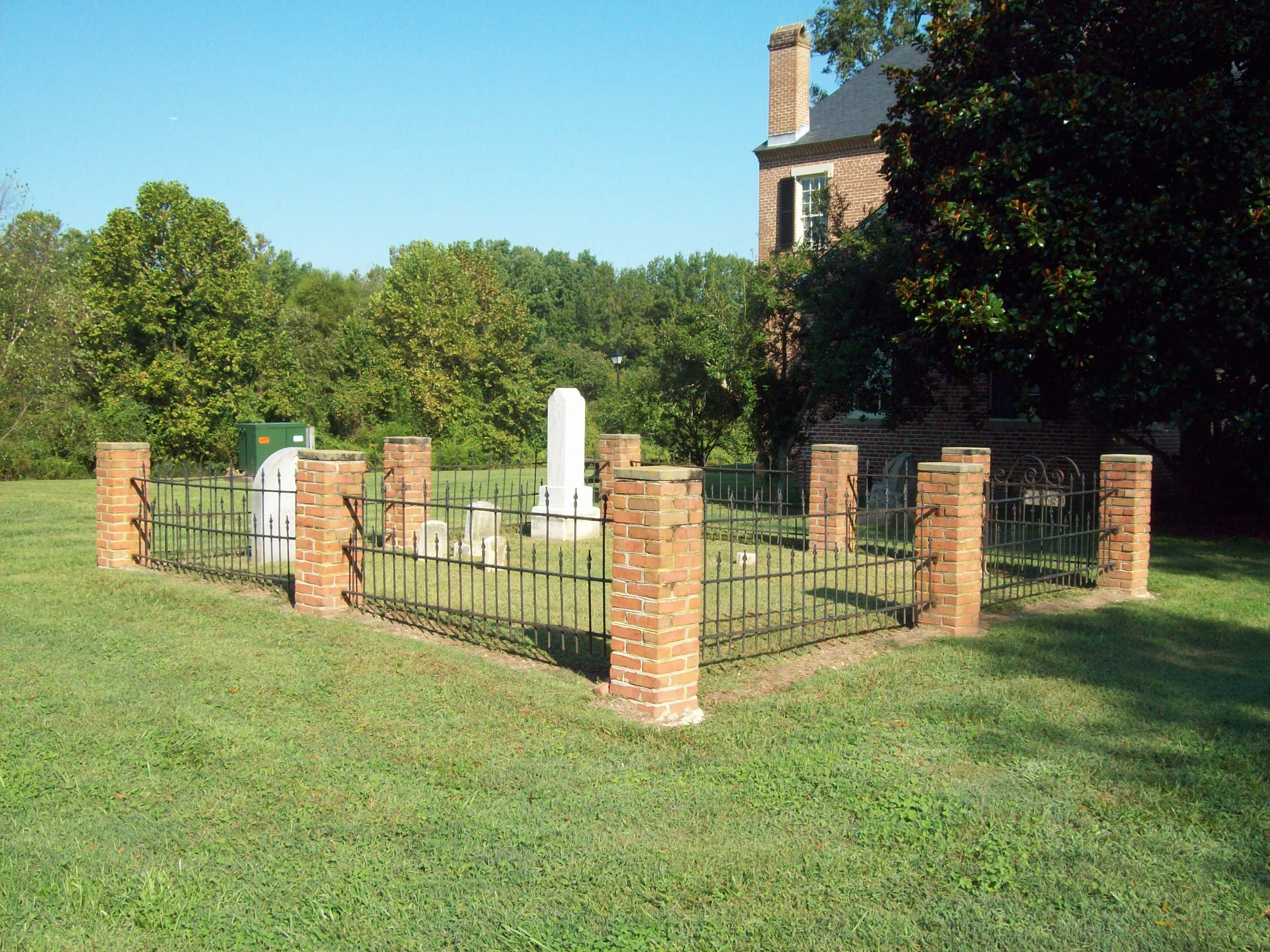
Port Tobacco Cemetery, September 2009

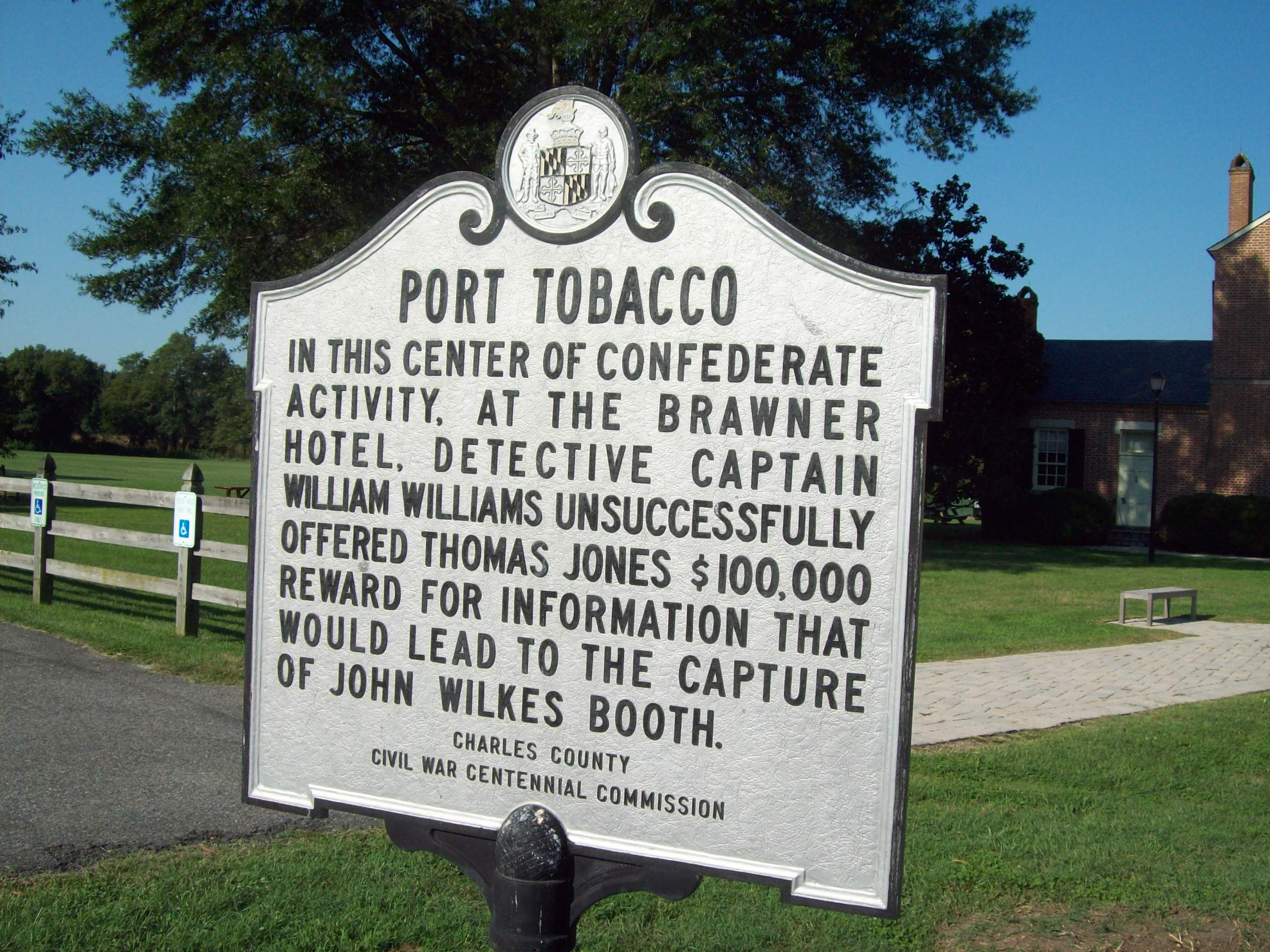
Port Tobacco Historic Marker, September 2009

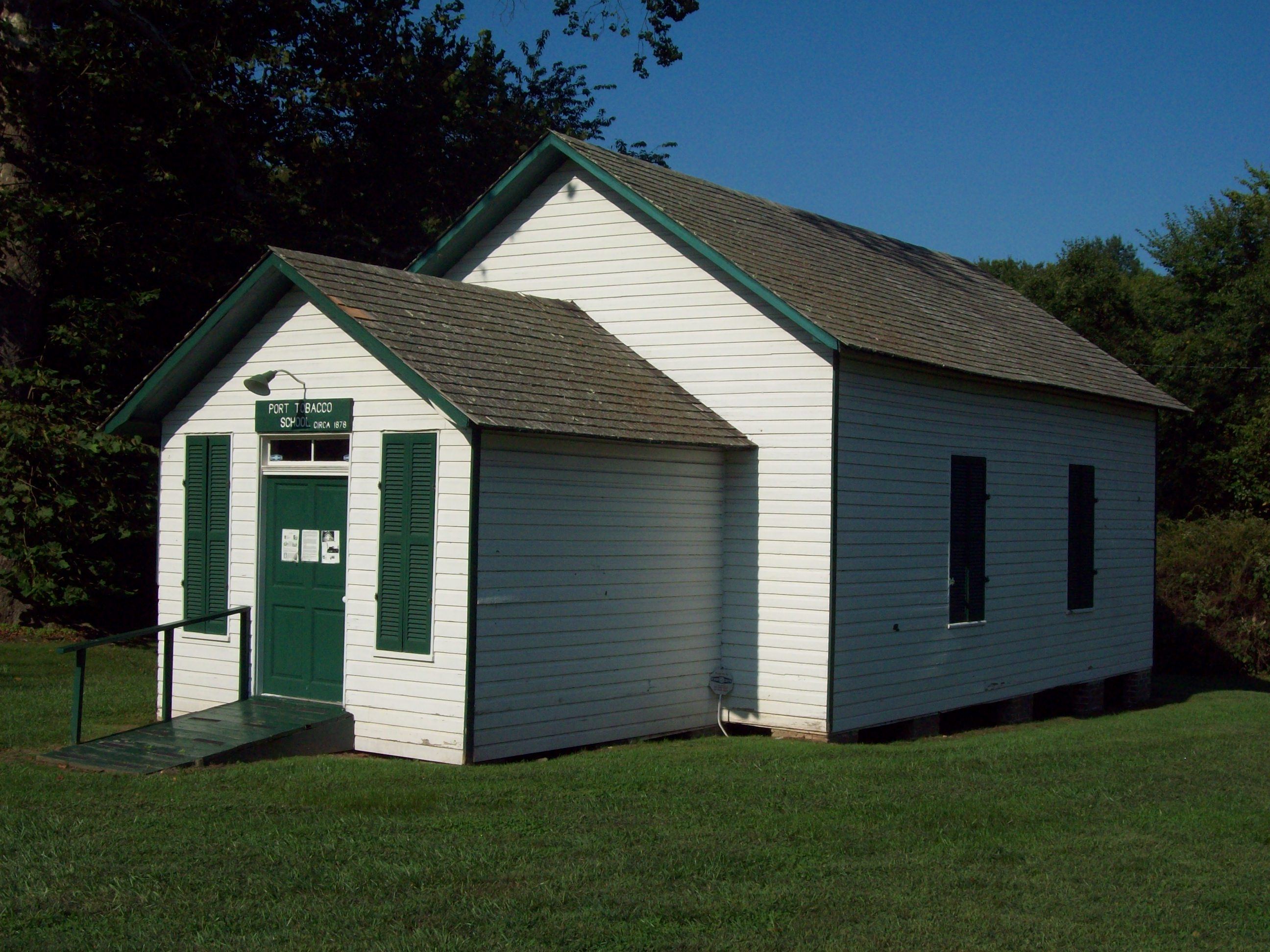
Port Tobacco Schoolhouse, September 2009
