= Maxwell Hall (Patuxent, Maryland) =

Historic house in Maryland, United States

- U.S. National Register of Historic Places
- Location within Maryland Location within the United States
- Location: 17388 Teagues Point Rd., Hughesville, MD 20637
- Coordinates: 38°32′4″N 76°42′1″W
- Area: 36 acres (15 ha)
- NRHP reference No.: 74000949
- Added to NRHP: July 30, 1974

Maxwell Hall is a historic home located near Patuxent, Charles County, Maryland. It is a 1 1/2-story, gambrel-roofed frame house with massive external chimneys.

Maxwell Hall was listed on the National Register of Historic Places in 1972.
