= Waddy House =

Historic house in Maryland, United States

- U.S. National Register of Historic Places
- Location within Maryland Location within the United States
- Location: Perryhawkin Road, Princess Anne, Maryland
- Coordinates: 38°11′37″N 75°38′54″W
- Area: 1 acre (0.40 ha)
- Built: 1740
- Architectural style: Georgian
- NRHP reference No.: 88002221
- Added to NRHP: November 3, 1988

The Waddy House, also known as the Williamson farm or the Jarvis Ballard house, is a historic home located at Princess Anne, Somerset County, Maryland, United States. It is a 1 1/2-story, Georgian-style mid-18th-century brick house supported by a raised Flemish bond brick foundation. The four-room plan dwelling measures 32 feet across by 32 feet deep. The house is one of a small collection of early brick houses surviving in Somerset County.

The Waddy House was listed on the National Register of Historic Places in 1988.
