= Patrick Creagh House =

Historic house in Maryland, United States

- U.S. National Register of Historic Places
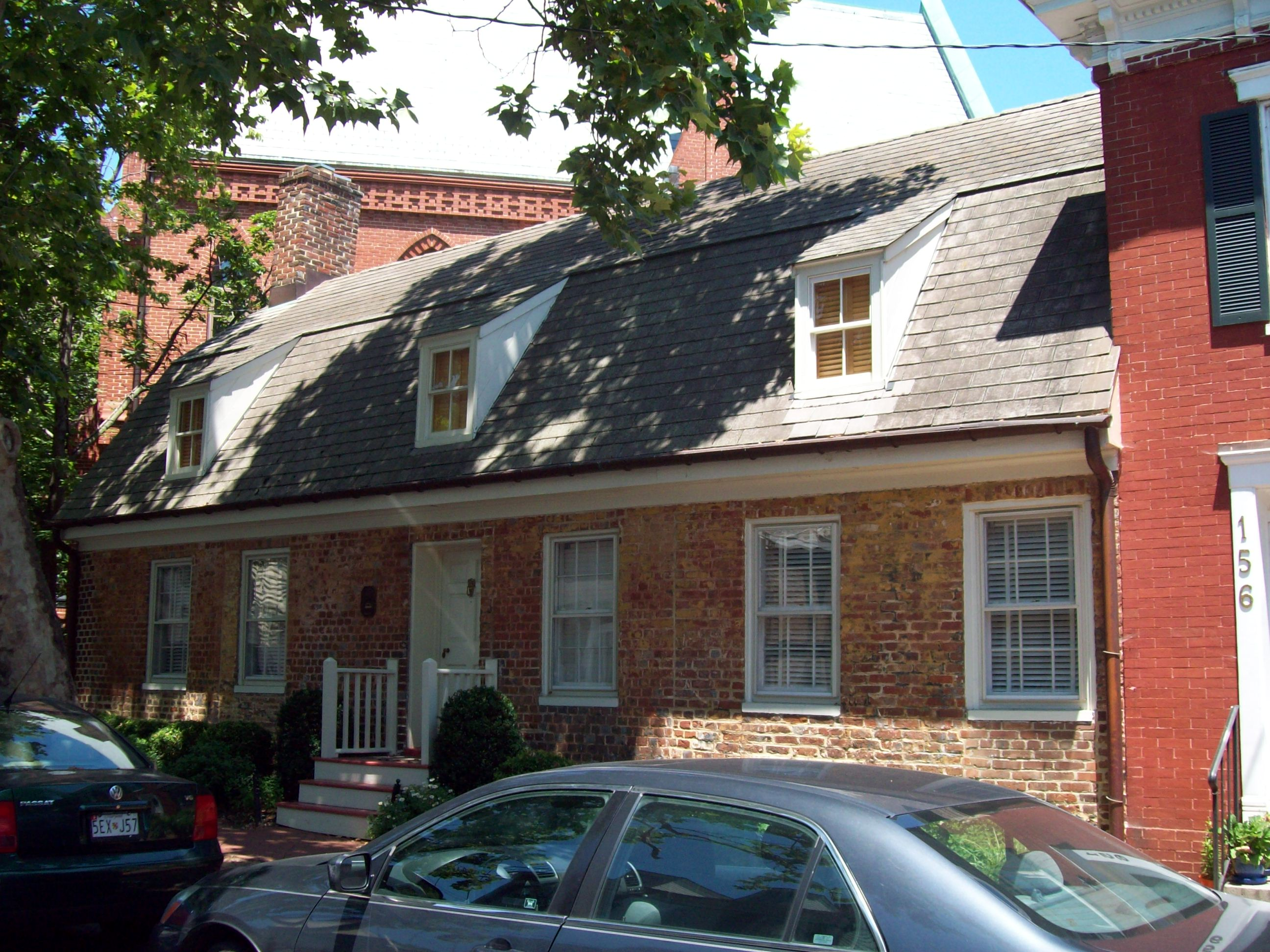
- Patrick Creagh House, July 2009

- Location within Maryland Location within the United States
- Location: 160 Prince George St., Annapolis, Maryland
- Coordinates: 38°58′44.2″N 76°29′13.4″W
- Area: 0.1 acres (0.040 ha)
- Built: 1741
- Built by: Creagh, Patrick
- NRHP reference No.: 73000889
- Added to NRHP: January 29, 1973

The Patrick Creagh House is a historic house located at 160 Prince George Street in Annapolis, Anne Arundel County, Maryland.

== Description and history ==
It is a single-pile, 1 1/2-story brick house with a steeply pitched gambrel roof. The house was originally built between 1735 and 1747 by local craftsman Patrick Creagh, and enlarged during the late 18th or early 19th centuries. In the early 19th century, the property was purchased by free African-American John Smith, whose wife operated Aunt Lucy's Bakeshop at the corner of Main and Greene Streets. Some walls of the house show scars from gunfire during the Civil War. The backyard of the house has been used in a number of remodeling advertisements.

The house was listed on the National Register of Historic Places on January 29, 1973.

The property was at one point owned by Martin and Eileen Friend (2006 - 2013). Their children are Joseph Friend (owner of the business Friend Commercial Real Estate), Sarah Friend, Daniel Friend, and Elizabeth Friend.
