= Lower Deer Creek Valley Historic District =

Historic district in Maryland, United States

- U.S. National Register of Historic Places
- U.S. Historic district
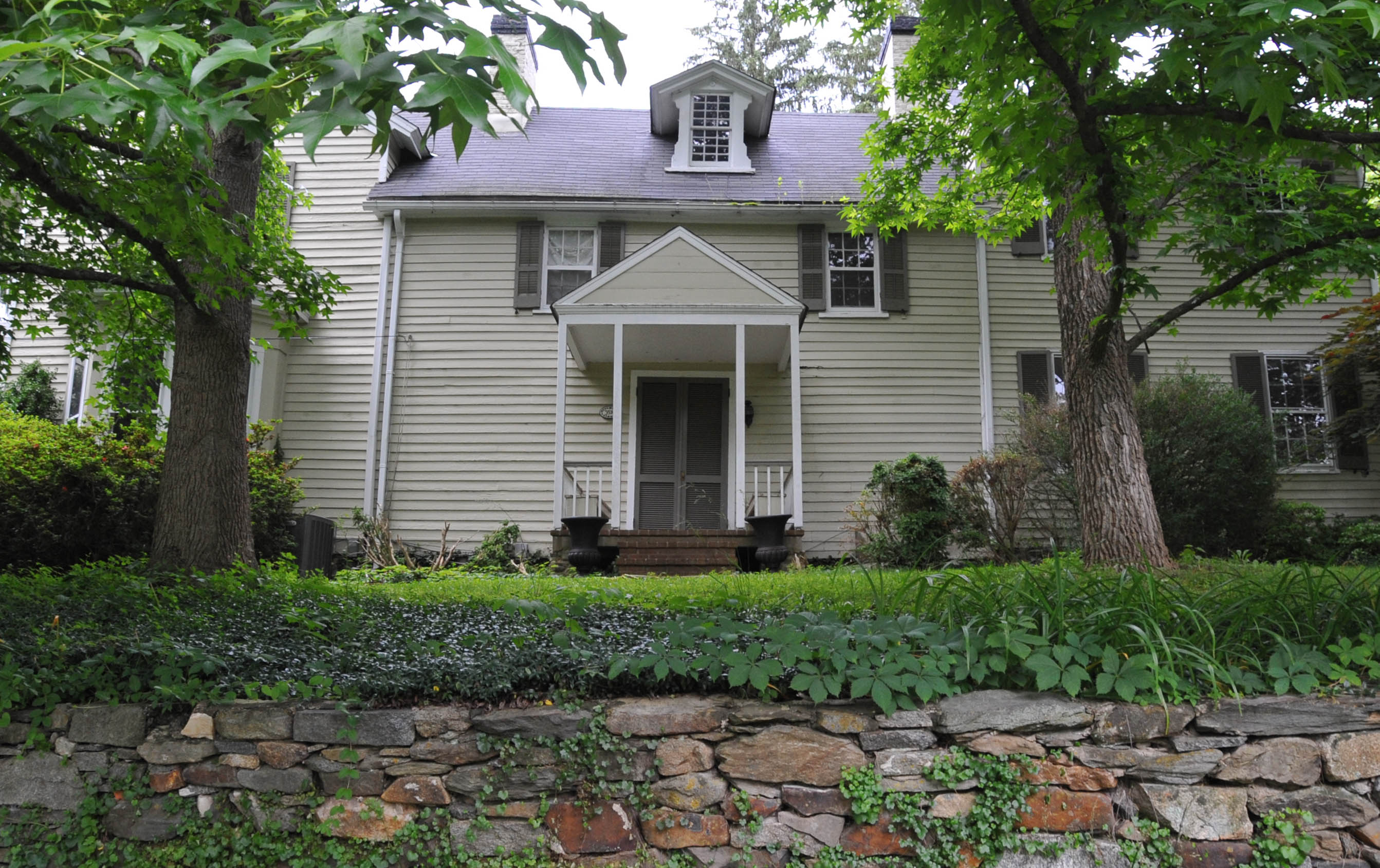
- Worthington House in Lower Creek Valley Historic District in 2007

- Location within Maryland Location within the United States
- Nearest city: Darlington, Maryland
- Coordinates: 39°36′43″N 76°14′5″W
- Area: 15,210 acres (6,160 ha)
- Architect: Cope, Walter; Multiple
- Architectural style: Early Republic, Mid 19th Century Revival, Colonial Revival
- NRHP reference No.: 93001143
- Added to NRHP: November 3, 1993

Lower Deer Creek Valley Historic District is a national historic district near Darlington, Harford County, Maryland, United States. It comprises approximately 15,020 acres (60.8 km^{2}) in north central Harford County. The primary building material is stone taken from local quarries and used to construct houses, mills, schoolhouses, and churches. Also constructed of stone are many dependencies including springhouses, stables, tenant houses, meathouses, ice houses, and barns. The district's contributing standing structures date from the mid 18th century to the 1940s, and mostly built in vernacular styles. The valley contains approximately 350 separate historic properties.

It was added to the National Register of Historic Places in 1993.
