= National Register of Historic Places listings in Cecil County, Maryland =

Location of Cecil County in Maryland

This is a list of the National Register of Historic Places listings in Cecil County, Maryland.

This is intended to be a complete list of the properties and districts on the National Register of Historic Places in Cecil County, Maryland, United States. Latitude and longitude coordinates are provided for many National Register properties and districts; these locations may be seen together in a map.

There are 54 properties and districts listed on the National Register in the county.

Contents: Counties in Maryland
Allegany - Anne Arundel - Baltimore (city) - Baltimore County - Calvert - Caroline - Carroll - Cecil - Charles - Dorchester - Frederick - Garrett - Harford - Howard - Kent - Montgomery - Prince George's - Queen Anne's - Somerset - St. Mary's - Talbot - Washington - Wicomico - Worcester

This National Park Service list is complete through NPS recent listings posted April 24, 2026.

== Current listings ==
	Name on the Register	Image	Date listed	Location	City or town	Description
1	Bohemia Farm	Bohemia Farm	April 11, 1973 (#73000912)	4920 Augustine Herman Highway; 1 mile south of the Bohemia River off Maryland Route 213; 39°27′01″N 75°51′44″W	Earleville	
2	Jeremiah Brown House and Mill Site	Jeremiah Brown House and Mill Site	November 2, 1987 (#87001391)	1416 Telegraph Rd. 39°42′13″N 76°00′15″W	Rising Sun	
3	Mercer Brown House	Mercer Brown House	May 29, 1987 (#87000815)	1270 England Creamery Rd. 39°41′28″N 75°59′52″W	Rising Sun	
4	Bumpstead Archeological Site	Bumpstead Archeological Site	December 16, 1983 (#83003745)	Address Restricted	Elkton	
5	Charlestown Historic District	Charlestown Historic District	April 14, 1975 (#75000880)	Bounded by Tasker and Ogle Sts., Louisa Lane, and the North East River; 39°34′26″N 75°58′32″W	Charlestown	
6	John Churchman House	John Churchman House	September 11, 1986 (#86002337)	115 Churchman Ln. 39°42′46″N 75°58′36″W	Calvert	
7	Colora Meetinghouse	Colora Meetinghouse	August 22, 1977 (#77000689)	Corncake Row; North of Colora on Lipencott Rd. 39°40′32″N 76°05′56″W	Colora	
8	Delaware Boundary Markers	Delaware Boundary Markers	February 18, 1975 (#75002101)	Boundary line dividing Delaware from Maryland and Pennsylvania	Multiple	Extends into Delaware and southeastern Pennsylvania.
9	East Nottingham Friends Meetinghouse	East Nottingham Friends Meetinghouse	August 19, 1977 (#77000691)	East of Rising Sun at the junction of Maryland Routes 272 and 273; 39°42′04″N 75°59′00″W	Rising Sun	
10	THE ELF (yacht)	THE ELF (yacht)	March 26, 1980 (#80001807)	Sassafras River; 39°21′43″N 75°53′13″W	Fredericktown	
11	Elk Landing	Elk Landing	September 7, 1984 (#84001596)	Landing Lane; 39°35′45″N 75°50′28″W	Elkton	
12	Elkton Armory	Elkton Armory	September 25, 1985 (#85002670)	Railroad Ave. and Bow St. 39°36′41″N 75°49′52″W	Elkton	
13	Isaac England House	Isaac England House	March 20, 1980 (#80001808)	1000 Crothers Road; 1 mile west of Zion on England Creamery Rd. 39°40′29″N 75°59′08″W	Zion	
14	Gilpin's Falls Covered Bridge	Gilpin's Falls Covered Bridge	December 3, 2008 (#08001125)	Maryland Route 272; 39°38′56″N 75°57′20″W	North East	
15	Grear Prehistoric Village Site	Grear Prehistoric Village Site	July 30, 1975 (#75000882)	Address Restricted	White Crystal Beach	
16	Great House	Great House	June 7, 1984 (#84001598)	284 Great House Farm Rd. 39°27′56″N 75°49′37″W	St. Augustine	
17	Greenfields	Greenfields	February 11, 1972 (#72000574)	South of Cecilton at 6840 Augustine Herman Highway on Maryland Route 213; 39°23′21″N 75°51′54″W	Cecilton	
18	Nathan and Susannah Harris House	Nathan and Susannah Harris House	March 22, 1984 (#84001602)	541 Rising Sun Rd. 39°41′45″N 76°04′53″W	Harrisville	
19	Edward W. Haviland House	Edward W. Haviland House	December 7, 2000 (#00001480)	2464 Frenchtown Rd. 39°36′22″N 76°06′06″W	Port Deposit	
20	Heath Farm Camp Archeological Site	Heath Farm Camp Archeological Site	December 16, 1983 (#83003747)	Address Restricted	Elkton	
21	Heath Farm Jasper Quarry Archeological Site	Heath Farm Jasper Quarry Archeological Site	December 16, 1983 (#83003753)	Address Restricted	Elkton	
22	Holly Hall	Holly Hall	October 8, 1976 (#76000986)	259 S. Bridge St. 39°36′08″N 75°49′41″W	Elkton	
23	Hopewell	Hopewell	May 9, 1979 (#79001120)	Northwest of Providence at 594 Little Elk Creek Road; 39°42′49″N 75°54′08″W	Providence	
24	Indian Queen Tavern and Black's Store	Indian Queen Tavern and Black's Store	February 20, 1975 (#75000881)	Market St. between Bladen and Cecil Sts. 39°34′27″N 75°58′39″W	Charlestown	
25	Iron Hill Cut Jasper Quarry Archeological Site	Iron Hill Cut Jasper Quarry Archeological Site	December 16, 1983 (#83003754)	Address Restricted	Elkton	
26	Elisha Kirk House	Elisha Kirk House	July 21, 1982 (#82002809)	18 Cross Keys Road; 39°41′55″N 75°59′04″W	Calvert	
27	Little Elk Farm	Little Elk Farm	May 9, 1979 (#79001121)	Northwest of Providence at 392 Little Elk Creek Road; 39°42′29″N 75°54′07″W	Providence	
28	Joshua Lowe House	Joshua Lowe House	April 5, 2001 (#01000337)	35 New Bridge Rd. 39°42′54″N 76°09′29″W	Rising Sun	
29	McCandless Archeological Site	McCandless Archeological Site	December 16, 1983 (#83003775)	Address Restricted	Elkton	
30	Mitchell House	Mitchell House	April 11, 1980 (#80001806)	3370 Singerly Road (213); 39°42′08″N 75°52′06″W	Fair Hill	
31	Mitchell House	Mitchell House	May 13, 1976 (#76000987)	131 E. Main St. 39°36′31″N 75°49′41″W	Elkton	
32	Mount Harmon	Mount Harmon	June 5, 1974 (#74000945)	Southwest of Earleville at 600 Grove Neck Rd. 39°23′02″N 75°56′29″W	Earleville	
33	New Castle and Frenchtown Railroad Right-of-Way	New Castle and Frenchtown Railroad Right-of-Way	September 1, 1976 (#76002290)	Off U.S. Route 40 between Porter, Delaware and Frenchtown; 39°35′37″N 75°45′54″W	Frenchtown	
34	Octorara Farm	Octorara Farm	May 7, 1980 (#80001805)	South of Conowing on Rowlandsville Road; 39°40′19″N 76°09′04″W	Conowingo	
35	Old Lock Pump House, Chesapeake and Delaware Canal	Old Lock Pump House, Chesapeake and Delaware Canal	October 15, 1966 (#66000390)	Maryland Route 213; 39°31′32″N 75°48′39″W	Chesapeake City	
36	Paw Paw Building	Paw Paw Building	November 28, 1977 (#77000690)	98 N. Main St. 39°36′28″N 76°07′07″W	Port Deposit	
37	Perry Point Mansion House and Mill	Perry Point Mansion House and Mill	July 2, 1975 (#75000883)	Veterans Administration Hospital grounds 39°32′58″N 76°04′15″W	Perryville	
38	Port Deposit	Port Deposit	May 23, 1978 (#78001452)	Eastern bank of the Susquehanna River, 10 miles (16 km) south of the Mason–Dixon line 39°36′32″N 76°07′09″W	Port Deposit	
39	Principio Furnace	Principio Furnace	February 11, 1972 (#72000575)	Address Restricted; 39°34′38″N 76°02′11″W	Perryville	
40	Thomas Richards House	Thomas Richards House	December 19, 1979 (#79001122)	3 miles west of Rising Sun on U.S. Route 1; 39°41′34″N 76°06′41″W	Rising Sun	
41	Rock United Presbyterian Church	Rock United Presbyterian Church	December 1, 1983 (#83003776)	Maryland Route 273 at Rock Church Rd. 39°42′07″N 75°53′09″W	Elkton	
42	Rodgers Tavern	Rodgers Tavern	April 26, 1972 (#72000576)	W. Main St. 39°33′26″N 76°04′42″W	Perryville	
43	Rose Hill	Rose Hill	November 5, 1974 (#74000946)	1100 Grove Neck Rd. 39°23′23″N 75°57′18″W	Earleville	
44	Snow Hill Site	Snow Hill Site	April 27, 1984 (#84001758)	Address Restricted	Port Deposit	
45	South Chesapeake City Historic District	South Chesapeake City Historic District	July 15, 1974 (#74000944)	East of Maryland Route 213, south of the Chesapeake and Delaware Canal; 39°31′37″N 75°48′51″W	Chesapeake City	
46	St. Francis Xavier Church	St. Francis Xavier Church	October 10, 1975 (#75000884)	1445 Bohemia Church Road; 39°26′16″N 75°48′12″W	Warwick	
47	St. Stephen's Episcopal Church	St. Stephen's Episcopal Church	April 29, 1982 (#82002810)	North of Earleville on Maryland Route 282; 39°25′31″N 75°55′06″W	Earleville	
48	Tome School for Boys Historic District	Tome School for Boys Historic District	May 16, 1984 (#84001760)	Bainbridge Naval Training Grounds; 39°36′10″N 76°06′26″W	Port Deposit	
49	Turkey Point Light Station	Turkey Point Light Station	December 2, 2002 (#02001421)	South Elk Neck State Park; 39°26′59″N 76°00′32″W	North East	
50	West Nottingham Academy Historic District	West Nottingham Academy Historic District	July 26, 1990 (#90001125)	Junction of Harrisville and Firetower Rds. 39°40′01″N 76°04′49″W	Colora	
51	West Nottingham Meetinghouse	West Nottingham Meetinghouse	November 7, 1976 (#76000988)	Southwest of Rising Sun at the junction of Cox and Cowen Rds. 39°41′12″N 76°04′46″W	Rising Sun	
52	West Nottingham Presbyterian Church Complex	West Nottingham Presbyterian Church Complex	January 30, 2025 (#100011349)	1195 Firetower Road; 39°40′14″N 76°04′34″W	Colora	
53	Woodlands	Woodlands	September 24, 1979 (#79003274)	93 Millcreek Lane; 39°34′12″N 76°03′27″W	Perryville	
54	Worsell Manor	Worsell Manor	August 31, 2023 (#100009275)	555 Worsell Manor Rd. 39°25′16″N 75°49′32″W	Warwick	

== See also ==
- List of National Historic Landmarks in Maryland
- National Register of Historic Places listings in Maryland
