= England House =

England House may refer to:
(sorted by state, then city/town)

- Abner Elliot England-Guy Hidden Lawrence House, Phoenix, Arizona, listed on the National Register of Historic Places (NRHP) in Maricopa County, Arizona
- England House (Little Rock, Arkansas), listed on the NRHP in Pulaski County, Arkansas
- French-England House, Little Rock, Arkansas, listed on the NRHP in Pulaski County, Arkansas
- Joseph E. England, Jr., House, North Little Rock, Arkansas, listed on the NRHP in Pulaski County, Arkansas
- England House and Mill, Newark, Delaware, listed on the NRHP in New Castle County, Delaware
- England Farm, Topeka, Kansas, listed on the NRHP in Shawnee County, Kansas
- Isaac England House, Zion, Maryland, listed on the NRHP in Cecil County, Maryland
