= Maryland Route 282 =

State highway in Maryland, United States

Maryland Route 282
- Maryland Route 282 highlighted in red

Route information
- Maintained by MDSHA
- Length: 12.43 mi (20.00 km)
- Existed: 1927–present
- Tourist routes: Chesapeake Country Scenic Byway

Major junctions
- West end: White Crystal Beach Road at Crystal Beach
- MD 213 in Cecilton
- East end: DE 299 in Warwick

Location
- Country: United States
- State: Maryland
- Counties: Cecil

Highway system
- Maryland highway system; Interstate; US; State; Scenic Byways
← MD 281	→ MD 284

Maryland Route 282 (MD 282) is a state highway in the U.S. state of Maryland. The highway runs 12.43 miles (20.00 km) from Crystal Beach east to the Delaware state line in Warwick, where the highway continues east as Delaware Route 299 (DE 299). MD 282 is the primary east–west highway of the Sassafras Neck between the Sassafras River and Bohemia River, connecting Crystal Beach, Earleville, and Warwick with MD 213 in Cecilton in southern Cecil County. The state highway was paved in Warwick by 1910 and constructed from Warwick to Cecilton in the late 1910s. West of Cecilton, what is today MD 282 consists of part of former MD 283, which ran from Crystal Beach to Earleville. MD 282 was constructed to Earleville in the early 1920s and extended a short distance west of Earleville in the late 1920s. MD 283 was constructed in the late 1920s and early 1930s. MD 282 was extended west to Crystal Beach along MD 283 in 1959. The highway from Cecilton to Crystal Beach was reconstructed in the late 1960s.

== Route description ==
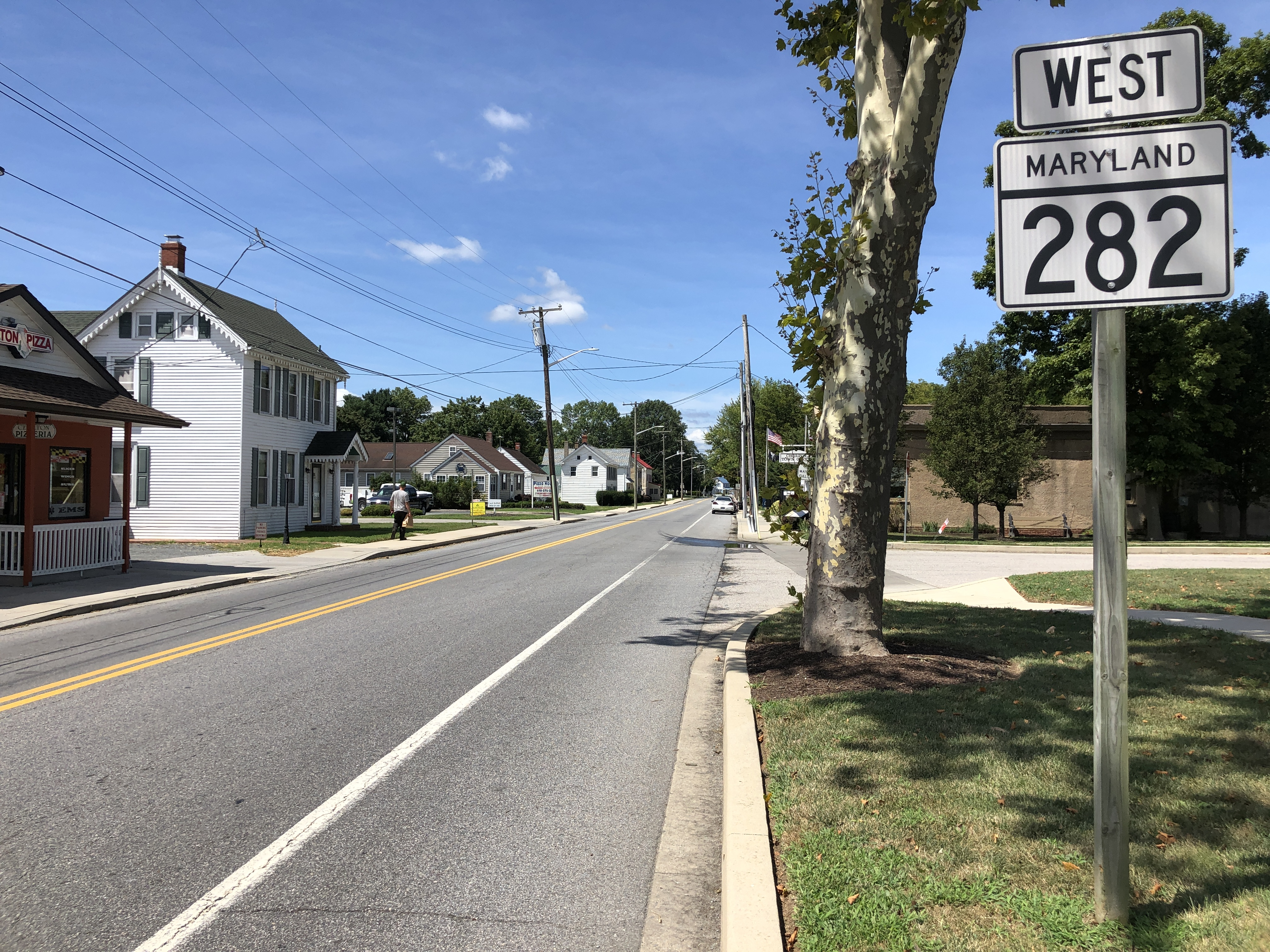
View west along MD 282 at MD 213 in Cecilton

MD 282 begins at the intersection of Crystal Beach Road and White Crystal Beach Road in Crystal Beach near the Elk River. The state highway starts heading north but curves southeast as two-lane undivided Crystal Beach Road along Pearce Neck. MD 282 curves south and passes southwest of St. Stephen's Episcopal Church while being paralleled by Old Crystal Beach Road. In Earleville, MD 282 makes a sweeping curve to the east, passing the intersection of Grove Neck Road, which leads to the historic estates Rose Hill and Mount Harmon. The state highway continues east to the town of Cecilton, within which the highway follows Main Street and intersects MD 213 (Bohemia Avenue). MD 282 leaves Cecilton along Cecilton Warwick Road. The Cecilton area is home to a small Amish settlement. After the intersection with Sassafras Road, MD 282 heads northeast through the village of Warwick and intersects Church Road, which leads northwest to St. Francis Xavier Church. At the east end of Warwick, the highway reaches its eastern terminus at the Delaware state line. The highway continues east as DE 299 (Warwick Road) toward the town of Middletown.

== History ==
Maryland Route 283
- Location: Crystal Beach–Earleville
- Length: 4.46 mi (7.18 km)
- Existed: 1928–1958

The first section of MD 282 to be paved was Main Street in Warwick, which was paved as a 14-foot-wide (4.3 m) macadam road by 1910. The remainder of the highway from Cecilton to Warwick was paved as a 14-foot-wide (4.3 m) macadam road by 1919. The highway from Cecilton to the east end of Earleville was paved as a 15-foot-wide (4.6 m) concrete road in 1922 and 1923. MD 282 was paved west from Earleville along Grove Neck Road west to Mount Harmon Road in 1929. The current course of MD 282 west of Earleville was originally part of MD 283. The first section of MD 283 was paved from the split from MD 282 near Earleville north to Glebe Road in 1928. MD 283 was extended west to Crystal Beach as a concrete road in two segments. The first segment was started in 1930 and completed by 1933, and the second segment was completed in 1934.

In 1934, the Maryland State Roads Commission proposed MD 282 between Cecilton and the Delaware state line be widened to 20 feet (6.1 m). In 1945, Cecil County proposed MD 283 be extended west to the Elk River and MD 282 be extended west 2 miles (3.2 km) toward the Sassafras River in the third year of a three-year post–World War II road construction program. The first proposal became reality when MD 282 was reconstructed and resurfaced from Cecilton to the state line in 1949 and 1950. The second proposal was never enacted; in fact, the Grove Neck Road portion of MD 282 was transferred to county maintenance in a May 8, 1958, road transfer agreement. MD 282 instead was extended west over MD 283 to Crystal Beach.

MD 282 was reconstructed from Cecilton to Earleville in 1966 and 1967. The highway was relocated at its sweeping curve in Earleville, eliminating a right-angle intersection at Peddlers Lane and a four-way intersection with Sandy Bottom Road and Grove Neck Road. The L-shaped bypassed highway at Peddlers Lane became MD 912, and the bypassed segments at Sandy Bottom Road became MD 282 auxiliary routes. MD 282 was reconstructed from Earleville to Crystal Beach in 1967 and 1968. The highway was relocated on either side of Glebe Road; Old Crystal Beach Road became MD 912A. MD 282 was widened from MD 213 to the Delaware state line in 1993 and from MD 213 to the west town limit of Cecilton in 1998.

== Junction list ==
The entire route is in Cecil County.

Location	mi	km	Destinations	Notes
Crystal Beach	0.00	0.00	Crystal Beach Road south / White Crystal Beach Road west	Western terminus
Cecilton	6.70	10.78	MD 213 (Bohemia Avenue) – Galena, Chesapeake City	
Warwick	12.43	20.00	DE 299 east (Warwick Road) – Middletown	Delaware state line; eastern terminus
1.000 mi = 1.609 km; 1.000 km = 0.621 mi

== Auxiliary routes ==
MD 282 had two auxiliary routes assigned to pieces of the highway bypassed by the relocation at the east end of the sweeping curve in Earleville in 1966 and 1967.

- MD 282A was the 0.03-mile-long (0.048 km) portion of Grove Neck Road from Sandy Bottom Road and MD 282B east to MD 282.
- MD 282B was the 0.03-mile-long (0.048 km) portion of the old Crystal Beach Road from Sandy Bottom Road and MD 282A north to MD 282.

Both highways were transferred to county maintenance through a December 27, 1979, road transfer agreement.
