= Home for Incurables =

Home for Incurables may refer to:

- St Barnabas Hospital (Bronx), New York, U.S.
- Julia Farr Centre, in Adelaide, South Australia
- Washington Home for Incurables, Washington, D.C., US
