= Bohemia Manor =

Bohemia Manor may refer to:

- Chesapeake City, Maryland, previously known as Bohemia Manor
- A former Jesuit plantation now consisting of only St. Francis Xavier Church in Warwick, Maryland
