= Providence, Maryland =

Providence, Maryland may refer to:

- Annapolis, Maryland, formerly Providence
- Providence, Cecil County, Maryland
