= Al Burris =

American baseball player (1874–1938)

- Pitcher
- Born: January 28, 1874; Warwick, Maryland
- Died: March 24, 1938 (aged 64); Salisbury, Maryland
- Batted: Right Threw: Right

MLB debut
- June 22, 1894, for the Philadelphia Phillies

Last MLB appearance
- June 22, 1894, for the Philadelphia Phillies

MLB statistics
- Win–loss record: 0-0
- Earned run average: 18.00
- Strikeouts: 0
- Stats at Baseball Reference

Teams
- Philadelphia Phillies (1894)

Alva Burton Burris (January 28, 1874 – March 24, 1938) was a pitcher in Major League Baseball, playing one game for the Philadelphia Phillies in 1894. He also served as a coach and athletic director at Washington College.

== Biography ==
Burris was born in Warwick, Maryland. He started attending Washington College in 1892 and played on the baseball team there. By his junior year in 1894, he had become the college's athletic director and coach of the baseball team. Burris also played in Major League Baseball, appearing in one game for the Philadelphia Phillies as a pitcher. He gave up 10 earned runs in five innings against the Baltimore Orioles, but he also had two hits and ended his MLB career with a batting average of .500.

Burris continued to serve as coach and athletic director until 1906. During the offseasons, he coached and played (at every position on the field) for local semi-pro teams in Cambridge and Salisbury, managing the Cambridge team to the Maryland-Delaware championship in 1908.

Burris also studied medicine around this time and eventually set up practices and a drug store after his initial managing days were over. In 1911, he returned to professional baseball and helped create the independent Peninsula League, serving as its first president in 1915. Burris was also a minor league manager for one season, in 1924, when he took over the Salisbury Indians of the Eastern Shore League. In his later years, he focused on his medical practice while also teaching sports to the youth of the community.

Burris suffered a stroke in 1938 and died in Salisbury, Maryland, at the age of 64. He was buried in Hollywood Cemetery. Burris was inducted into the Eastern Shore Baseball Hall of Fame in 2010.
