= Mary E. Ireland =

American author and translator (1834–1927)

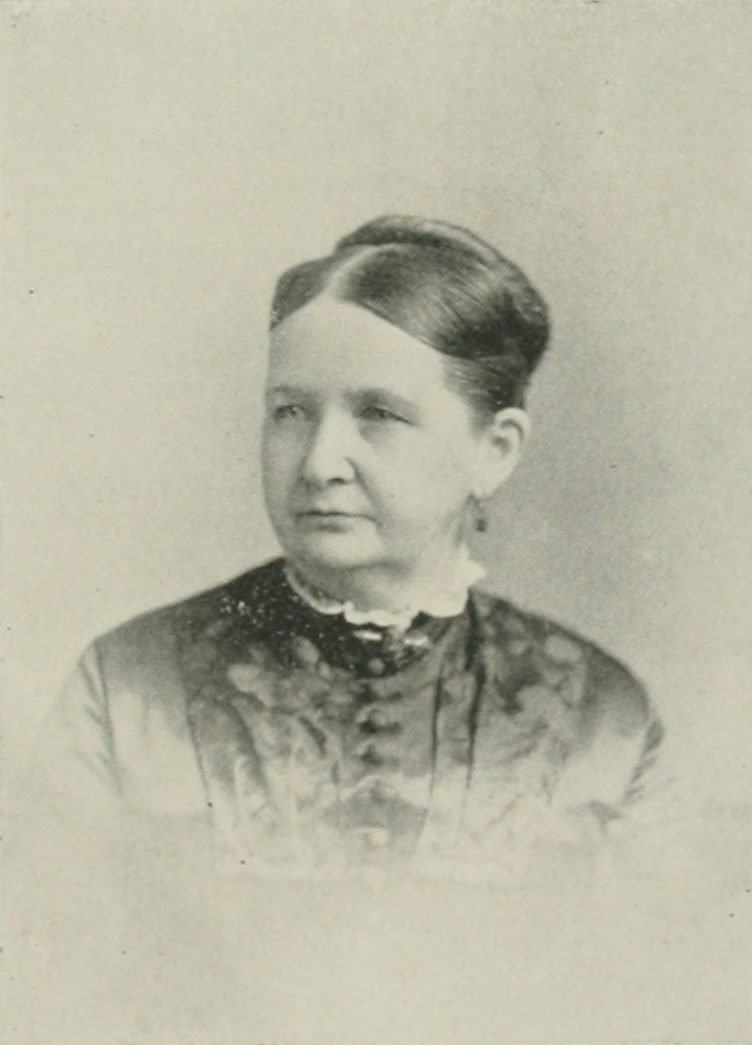
- "A Woman of the Century"
- Born: Mary Eliza Haines; January 9, 1834; Brick Meeting House (now, Calvert), Maryland U.S.
- Died: October 29, 1927 (aged 93); Home for Incurables, Washington, D.C., U.S.
- Resting place: Rosebank Cemetery, Calvert, Maryland, U.S.
- Occupations: author; translator
- Spouse: John M. Ireland (m. 1859; died 1911)
- Children: 3
- Writing career
- Pen name: Marie Norman
- Language: English, German
- Genres: stories; poems; essays; children's literature
- Notable works: Timothy and his friends

Signature
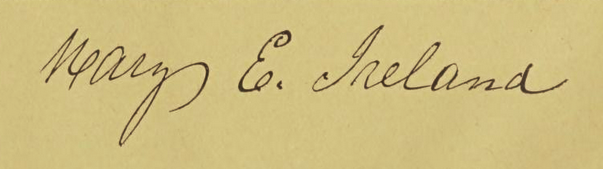

Mary E. Ireland (née, Haines; pen name, Marie Norman; January 9, 1834 – October 29, 1927) was an American author and translator. Born in Maryland, she lived a busy life in Washington, D.C., looking upon her literary labors as a recreation. Though she is remembered as "the poetess of Cecil County", she commenced to write poetry comparatively late in life, and not until she had attained distinction as a writer of prose. From 1895 through 1918, she wrote many popular books for young people, besides being the author of stories, poems, and essays. Her works appeared in the Cecil Whig, Scribner's Magazine, Oxford Press, Arthur's Magazine, Cottage Hearth, Household, Literary World, Ladies' Cabinet, and Woman's Journal. Her most popular work was Timothy and his friends. She translated from German the works of Bertha Clément (1852-1930), Elisabeth Philippine Karoline von Dewitz (1820-1899), Nikolaus Fries (1823-1894), Elizabeth Halden (pseudonym of Agnes Breitzmann), John J. Messmer, Karl Gustav Nieritz (1795-1876), Otto Nietschmann (1840-1929), Emmy von Rhoden (pseudonym of Emilie Auguste Karoline Henriette Friedrich-Friedrich), Richard Roth, and Emma Seifert.

== Early life and education ==
Mary Eliza Haines was born in the village of Brick Meeting House (now Calvert), Maryland, January 9, 1834. She was a daughter of Joseph and Harriet (Kirk) Haines. On father's side, sixth in descent from Richard Haines, English Quaker, who came from Oxfordshire in 1682. On mother's side, Scotch-Irish; sixth in descent from Roger Kirk, who came from Lurgen, Province of Ulster, in 1712. Both families bought tracts of land adjoining the 40 acres given in person by William Penn in 1701 on which to build the Friends' meeting house. They supposed they were in Chester County, Pennsylvania, but when, in 1763, the Mason–Dixon line was run, they found that they were in Cecil County, Maryland. Her great-grandfather, Job Haines, as member of the Maryland Legislature, attended, with other members of that body, the funeral of General George Washington. In the old homestead of her parents, she grew to adulthood, along with siblings, Charles (1826-1866), Cornelia (b. 1828), Lewis K. (1831-1835), William L. (b. 1825), and Reuben (b. 1840).

Ireland was educated in the ladies' seminary of Jamaica, Long Island, and had talent for music and painting.

== Career ==
When quite young, Ireland' wrote a short story entitled "Ellen Linwood", under the nom de plume of "Marie Norman", which was published in the Cecil Whig, then edited by Palmer C. Ricketts. One of her first sketches was "The Defoe Family in America," published in Scribner's Magazine in 1876, which was widely copied into other periodicals. For the next few years, she occasionally wrote for the Cecil Whig and Oxford Press.

She wrote a story for Arthur's Magazine, and being in Philadelphia soon after it was written, she took it to the publishing house, and there met for the first time Timothy Shay Arthur, whom she had known from childhood through his books. He received her kindly, promised to read her story, and to let her know his decision the next day. That decision was, that though entertaining and well written, it was scarcely suited to his magazine. He suggested another periodical where it would likely meet with favor. He also asked for another story, and presented her with a set of the magazines that she might see the style of writing that he desired. Her next story for Arthur's was a success, and from that time until his death, he remained the candid critic of all she sent him for publication, as well as of some stories published elsewhere, and the kind literary adviser and friend. She retained her first story (which he had declined) for three years, made some changes in it, and he accepted and published it.

She afterward became a contributor to Cottage Hearth, Household, and other domestic magazines, besides The Literary World, Ladies' Cabinet, Woman's Journal, and several church papers. Her time included reviewing new books for the press. She wrote two prize stories which took first prizes. In 1882, her short stories were collected and made into a continued story which was published by J. B. Lippincott & Co., Philadelphia, under the title of Timothy, His Neighbors and His Friends. Many letters of appreciation from distant parts of the country testified to the merit of the book, and she was encouraged to accede to the request of the Presbyterian Observer Company of Baltimore to write a serial for their paper. It was entitled "Ivandale", and was warmly commended by judges of literary work. In Otterbrook's Blessing (1902), Ireland wrote a tender, inspiring story of girl life, as told by Liela Harcourt in her diary, commenced the day she was sixteen, at the suggestion of her grandmother. Otterbrook Parsonage (1904), a continuation of Otterbrook's Blessing, is as cheery and wholesome in tone as its predecessor, depicting Liela Harcourt living a happy and useful life as the wife of the village pastor.

Wishing to read German literature in the original, she began studying the language. As she was unwilling to make time for regular lessons, she obtained a German pronouncing reader, and without instruction from anyone, she succeeded in learning to read and translate, pronouncing correctly enough to be understood by native speakers. This knowledge of the language was a well-spring of pleasure to her, and well repaid her for the attention she paid upon it each day.

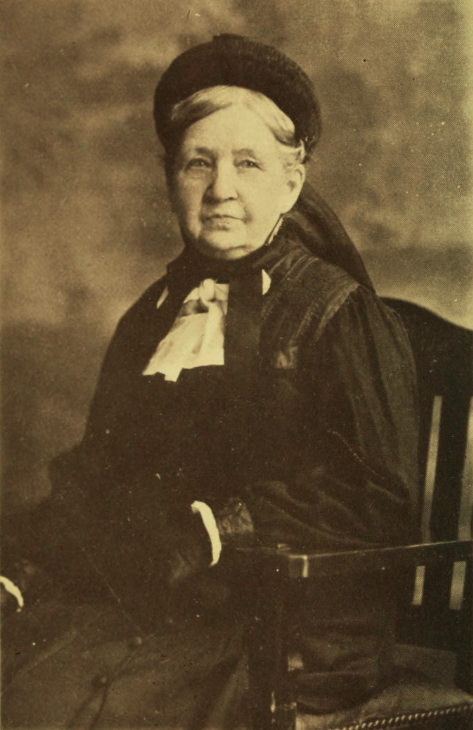
1913

Translating from the German became a favorite pastime. She translated from the German several books, two of which were published as serials in the Oxford Press, and the Lutheran Board of Publication published one of her translations. From the same language, many short stories were translated by Ireland and included in periodicals of the era. Doctor Eckhart's Boys (1902) is a story of a family of children, and tells of the simplicity and beauty of the life of the family in the rural home from which emanates a religious influence. Days of Peter the Great, is a true story of the times of that sovereign. Happy Days at Grandfather's tells of Lottie Von Alstyne, whose father, an officer in the army, was ordered to Constantinople, and went to remain a year, accompanied by Mrs. Von Alstyne. Lottie's Second Year with the Wendorfs is a sequel to Happy Days at Grandfather's. Stolen for Ransom is about the adventures of a crown prince who was kidnapped while walking with his teacher on the bank of a river, and taken to a secluded house on an island, where he led a sad life until kind Providence sent him a companion, a boy near his own age, the son of a cultured and educated gentleman who passed as a fisherman. An Obstinate Maid, in the original, went through 21 editions before the translation by Ireland. Other translations published in book form included Red Carl (treating of the labor question), Lenchen's Brother, Platzbacker of Plauen, The Block House on the Shore, Erna Stark, Christian Beck's Grandson, Her First and Only School Friend, Adolph's Victories, In Days of Abd-el-Rader, The School of Luneburg Heath, Driven Out, Eric's Vacation, Life Work of Pastor Louis Harms, The First School Year, Dorris and Her Mountain Home, The Tower Angel, and Pixy's Holiday Journey.

== Personal life ==
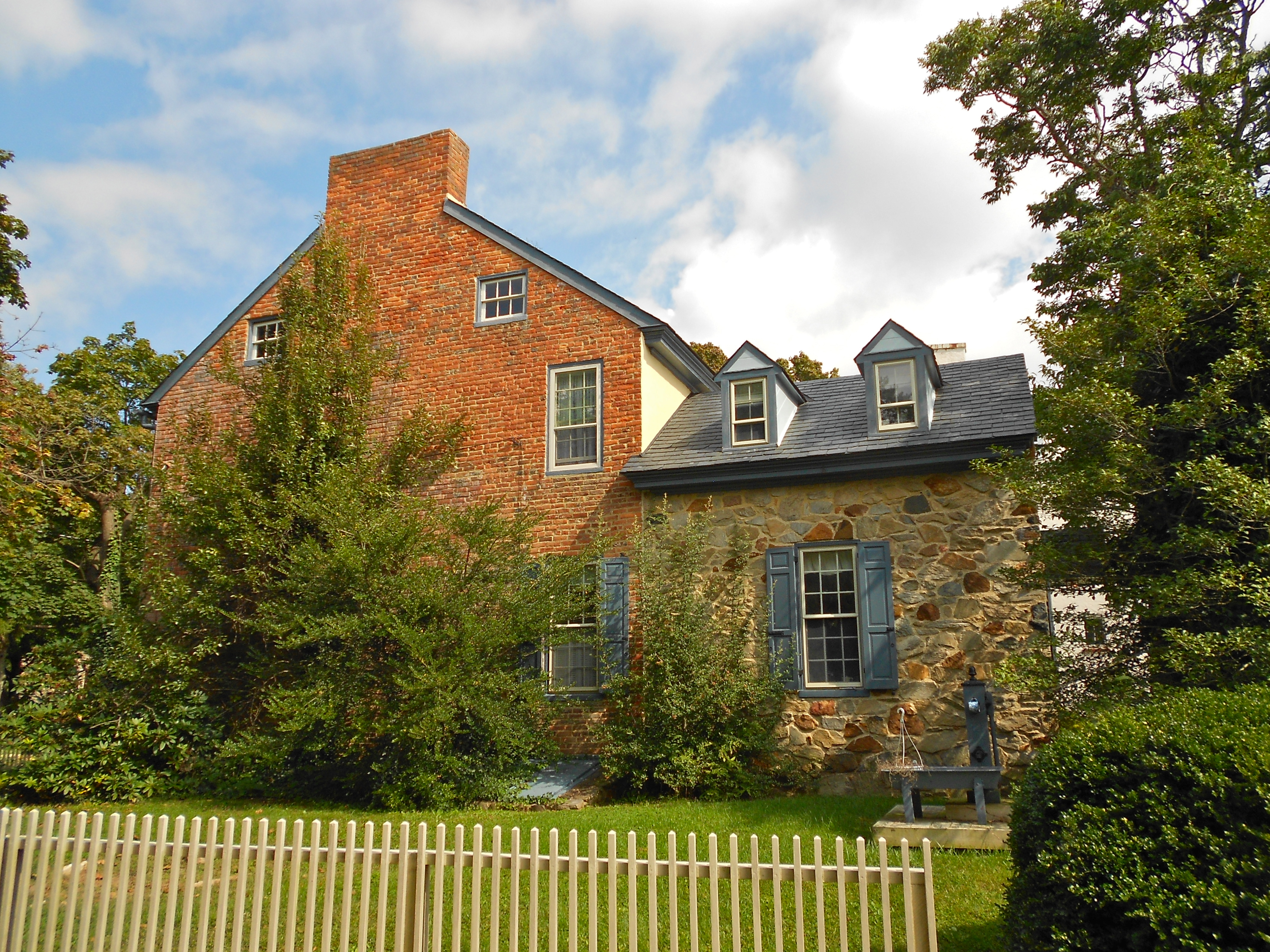
Elisha Kirk House

In 1859, she married John M. Ireland (d. March 1911), a country merchant, son of Colonel Joseph Ireland, of Kent County, Maryland, with whom she lived in her own homestead. During the period of 1867 through the mid 1880s, they lived at the Elisha Kirk House. By 1887, they resided in Baltimore, where Mr. Ireland held the position of United States storekeeper in the Internal Revenue Department. Thereafter, they removed to Washington, D.C.

They were the parents of three children, one of whom died in infancy.

She was a member of Eastern Presbyterian Church and of its missionary society, as well as the Woman's Christian Temperance Union.

Mary Eliza Ireland died at the Home for Incurables in Washington, D.C., October 29, 1927, age 94. Interment was at Rosebank Cemetery, Calvert, Maryland.

== Selected works ==
=== Books ===
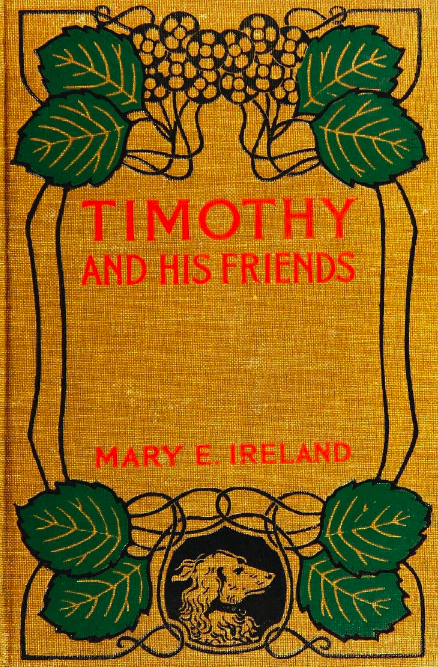

- What I told Dorcas : a story for mission workers (1895)
- Thamar and the destruction of Jerusalem (19??)
- Grandma Elliot's farmhouse : a story for girls and boys (1900)
- Hilda's Mascot: A Tale of "Maryland, My Maryland" (1902)
- Nan's first term : and other stories of school and adventure (1902)
- Timothy and his friends (1902)
- Otterbrook's blessing : a delightful story gleaned from a girl's diary (1902)
- The young patriot; and, the table prayer (1903)
- Otterbrook parsonage (1904)
- The young violinist (illustrated by Carll B Williams; 1906)
- Daniel Defoe, the Author of Robinson Crusoe: With Notes about Brick Meeting House, Maryland, where Some of Defoe's Relatives Still Live (1906)
- Otterbrook people (1907)
- The Titanic (1912)
- The emigrants (1918)
- Under the cherry blossoms

=== Translations ===
- Red Carl (translated from the German of John J. Messmer; 1888)
- Erna Stark: a story of conscience (translated from the German of Elise von Fernhain; 1892)
- In fair Silesia (translated from the German of Gustav Nieritz; 1894)
- The shepherd's family (translated from the German of Karl Gustav Nieritz; 1894)
- The doctor's family; or, The story of the Erlaus (translated from the German of Elizabeth Halden; 1896)
- Dr. Eckhart's boys (translated from the German of Emma Seifert; 1901)
- Prince Albrecht of Brandenburg; a story of the reformation (translated from the German of Hermann Otto Nietschmann; 1907)
- Homes in Schafhausen; stories from the seven petitions of the Lord's Prayer (translated from the Tenth Edition of the German of Pastor Nikolaus Fries; 1913)
- Prince Frederick and the dawn of the reformation (translated from the fifth edition of the German of Richard Roth; 1913)
- King Otto's crown (translated from the German of Richard Roth; 1917)
- Days of Peter the Great (translated from the seventeenth edition of the German of Gustav Nieritz)
- Happy Days at Grandfather's (translated from the fourth edition of the German of Bertha Clement)
- Lottie's Second Year with the Wendorfs (translated from the German of Bertha Clement)
- Stolen for Ransom (translated from the German of Gustav Nieritz)
- An Obstinate Maid (translated from the German of Emma Von Rhoden)
- Betty's Decision
- The Block House on the Shore
- Christian Beck's Grandson
- Her First and Only School Friend
- Adolph's Victories
- In Days of Abd-el-Rader
- The School of Luneburg Heath
- Driven Out
- Eric's Vacation
- Life Work of Pastor Louis Harms
- The First School Year
- Dorris and Her Mountain Home
- The Tower Angel
- Pixy's Holiday Journey
