= Fredericktown, Maryland =

Unincorporated community in Maryland, United States

- Unincorporated community
- Location within the State of Maryland Fredericktown (the United States)
- Coordinates: 39°21′58″N 75°53′02″W
- Country: United States
- State: Maryland
- County: Cecil
- Established: before 1757
- Time zone: UTC-5 (Eastern (EST))
  - Summer (DST): UTC-4 (EDT)

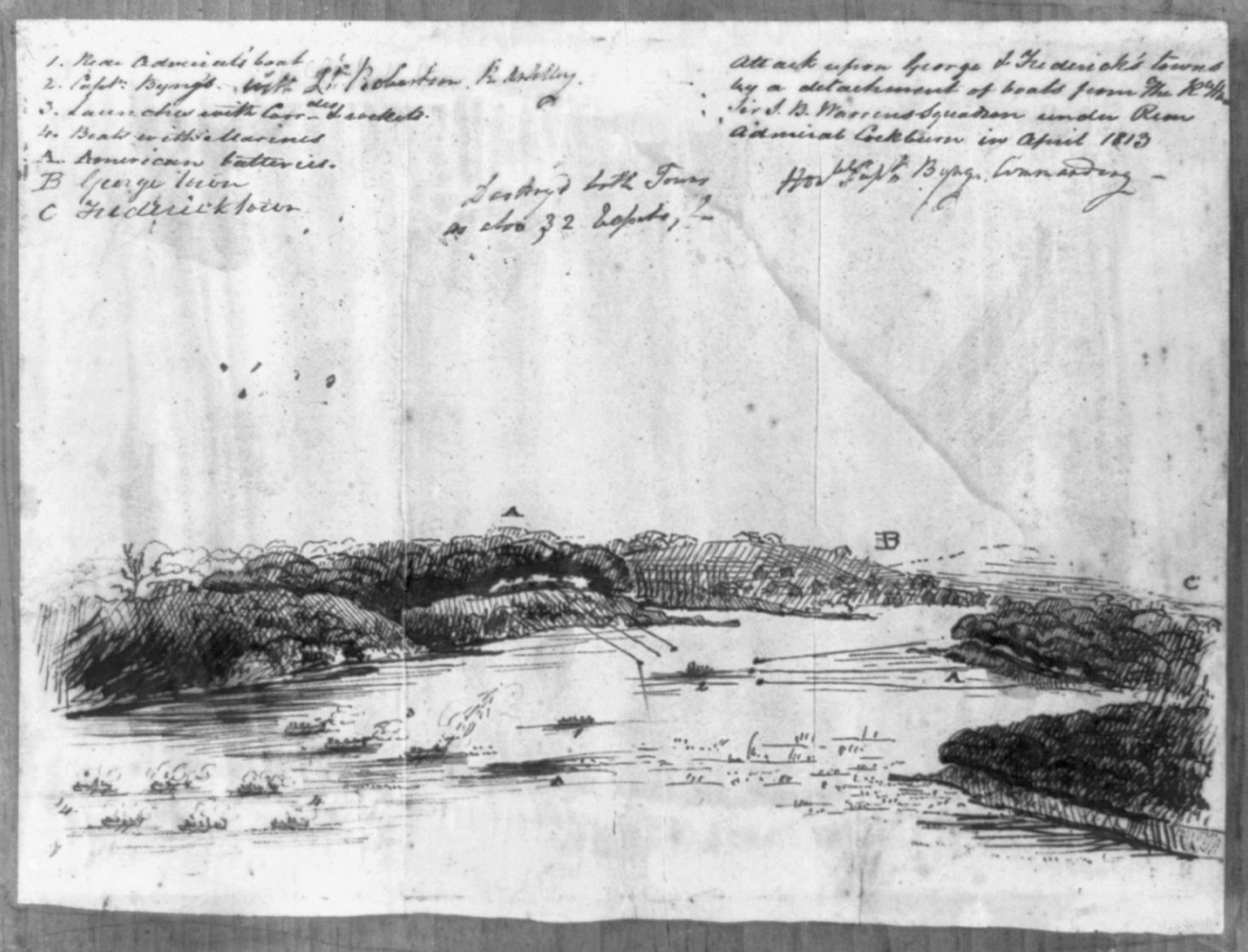
Attack upon George & Federick's towns by a detachment of boats from The R. Hon. Sir J. B. Warrens squadron under Rear Admiral Cockburn in April 1813

Fredericktown is an unincorporated community in Cecil County, Maryland, United States.

The Elf racing yacht is located in the Sassafras River at Fredericktown, and was listed on the National Register of Historic Places on March 26, 1980.

Fredericktown was first permanently settled generations before 1757. The town began to grow by its location: fishing and sailing were frequent enjoyments of the town. But, the town was destroyed by fire during a British raid in the War of 1812. Some of the earliest buildings in the town were built following the cessation of hostilities, after 1815.

Owen Burns, an entrepreneur, banker, builder, and land developer who at one time owned the majority of Sarasota, Florida, was born in Fredericktown.
