= Grear Prehistoric Village Site =

- U.S. National Register of Historic Places
- Nearest city: Crystal Beach, Maryland
- Area: 13 acres (5.3 ha)
- NRHP reference No.: 75000882
- Added to NRHP: July 30, 1975

The Grear Prehistoric Village Site is an archeological site located near Crystal Beach, Cecil County, Maryland. The site was discovered and tested by an amateur archeologist in 1971. It is the northernmost known Late Woodland period village site on the Eastern Shore of the Chesapeake Bay outside of the Susquehanna River Basin.

It was listed on the National Register of Historic Places in 1975.
