= England House and Mill =

Historic house in Delaware, United States

- U.S. National Register of Historic Places
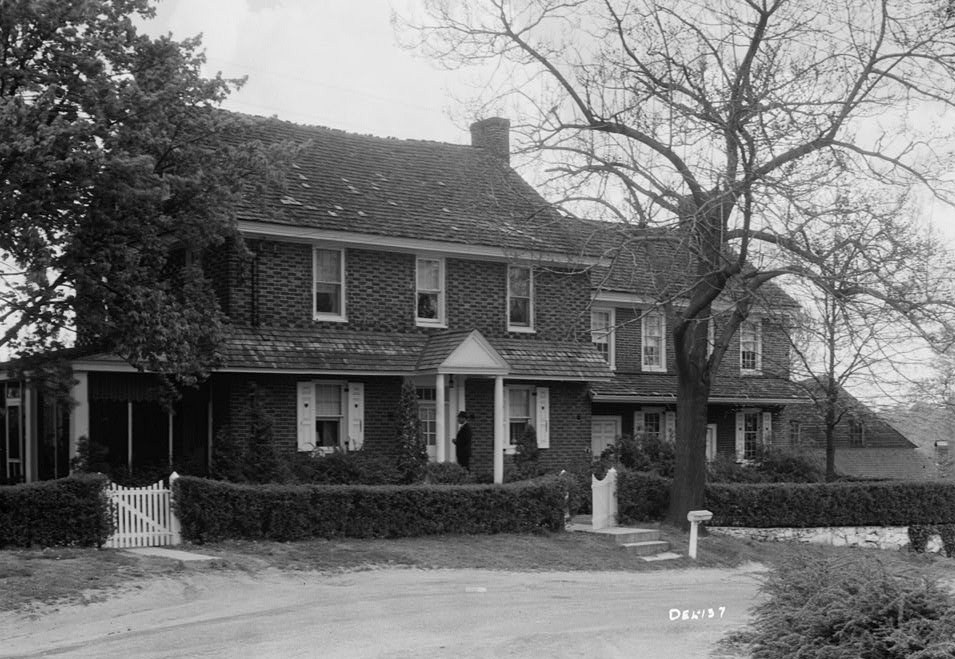
- John England House, HABS Photo, 1937

- Location within Delaware Location within the United States
- Location: 81 Red Mill Rd., Newark, Delaware
- Coordinates: 39°41′32″N 75°42′29″W
- Area: 3.5 acres (1.4 ha)
- Built: 1747
- NRHP reference No.: 72001597
- Added to NRHP: February 23, 1972

England House and Mill, also known as Red Mill Farm, is a historic home located in Newark, Delaware. The two-story brick dwelling was built in 1747. The oldest part of the house is believed to be the larger upper level; the smaller lower level having been added later for the miller. The upper level measures approximately 33 feet (10 m) by 32 feet (9.8 m) and the lower level about 29 feet (8.8 m) by 19 feet (5.8 m).

It was added to the National Register of Historic Places in 1972.
