= Washington Home and Community Hospices =

US health charity located in Washington, D.C.

Washington Home for Incurables
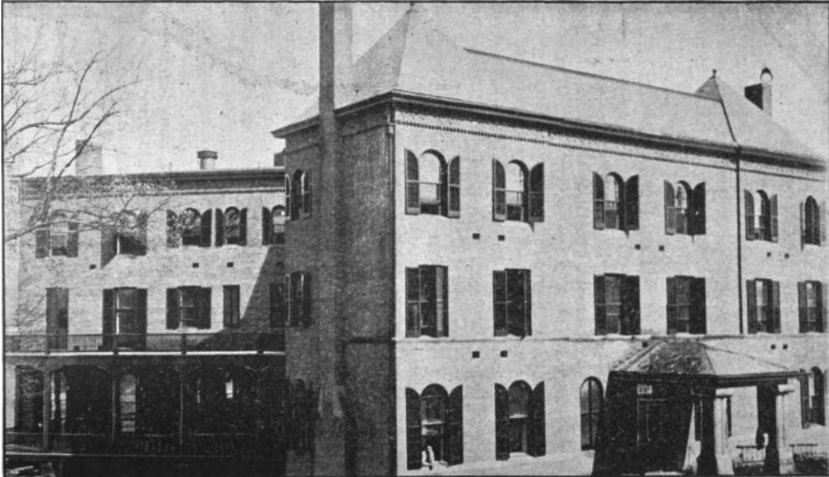
- Formation: 1888
- Founder: Mrs. S. Charles Hill
- Founded at: Washington, D.C.
- Purpose: provide home for persons afflicted with any incurable physical disability or disease

Washington Home and Community Hospices is a US health charity located in Washington, D.C., formerly called Washington Home for Incurables. Founded by Mrs. S. Charles Hill in 1888, it was incorporated March 6, 1889. Its object was to provide a comfortable and permanent home for persons afflicted with any incurable physical disability or disease, for whom no provision exists elsewhere. Previous to this time there was no provision for such cases.

== History ==
The Home was founded in 1888 by Fanny Hill, wife to S. Charles Hill who was philanthropist William Wilson Corcorans sister Martha Ellen's son. The Home was first located on Meridian Avenue, Mount Pleasant, in a building which soon proved altogether inadequate for the increasing demands made upon it. In 1892, land was obtained north of U Street, between Thirty-first and Thirty-second, on Georgetown Heights. Here a new building, costing over US$50,000 was erected. The new building was made possible without any public appropriation.

The Home was open to any person with an incurable disease except those suffering from mental derangement and contagious diseases, and was intended for those chronic cases which were not desired by a general hospital. Patients who are able to pay anything, however small, toward their maintenance were expected to do so, but those who were not, were cared for without charge. No discrimination was made either in admission or accommodations between those who did and those who did not pay. Application was made on a form, and had to be certified by a physician. The applicant was then examined by a member of the medical staff as to his eligibility, and, if found suitable, was placed on the waiting list, as the Home was not large enough to accommodate all who applied. The home contained a cancer ward, and a children's ward. Only four cancer cases could be received at a time. Each patient had a private room, which were furnished by someone as a memorial. When full, there were accommodations for 46 patients: 31 women and 15 men. In 1927, author Mary E. Ireland was one such patient.

The medical staff consisted of four attending physicians, nine consulting physicians and a resident physician. The Home received an appropriation of US$4,000 from Congress, and the other funds necessary for its support were raised by private donations and by charitable entertainments. Management oversight was handled by a Ladies' Board.

== Recent Developments ==
The Washington Home for Incurables changed its name into Washington Home and Community Hospices in 2001.

== Bibliography ==
- District of Columbia (2005). District of Columbia Register. Vol. 52 (Public domain ed.). District of Columbia, Office of Documents.
- Medical Society of the District of Columbia (1907). Washington Medical Annals. Vol. 5 (Public domain ed.). Washington D.C. This article incorporates text from this source, which is in the public domain.: Medical Society of the District of Columbia.
