= Worsell Manor =

- U.S. National Register of Historic Places
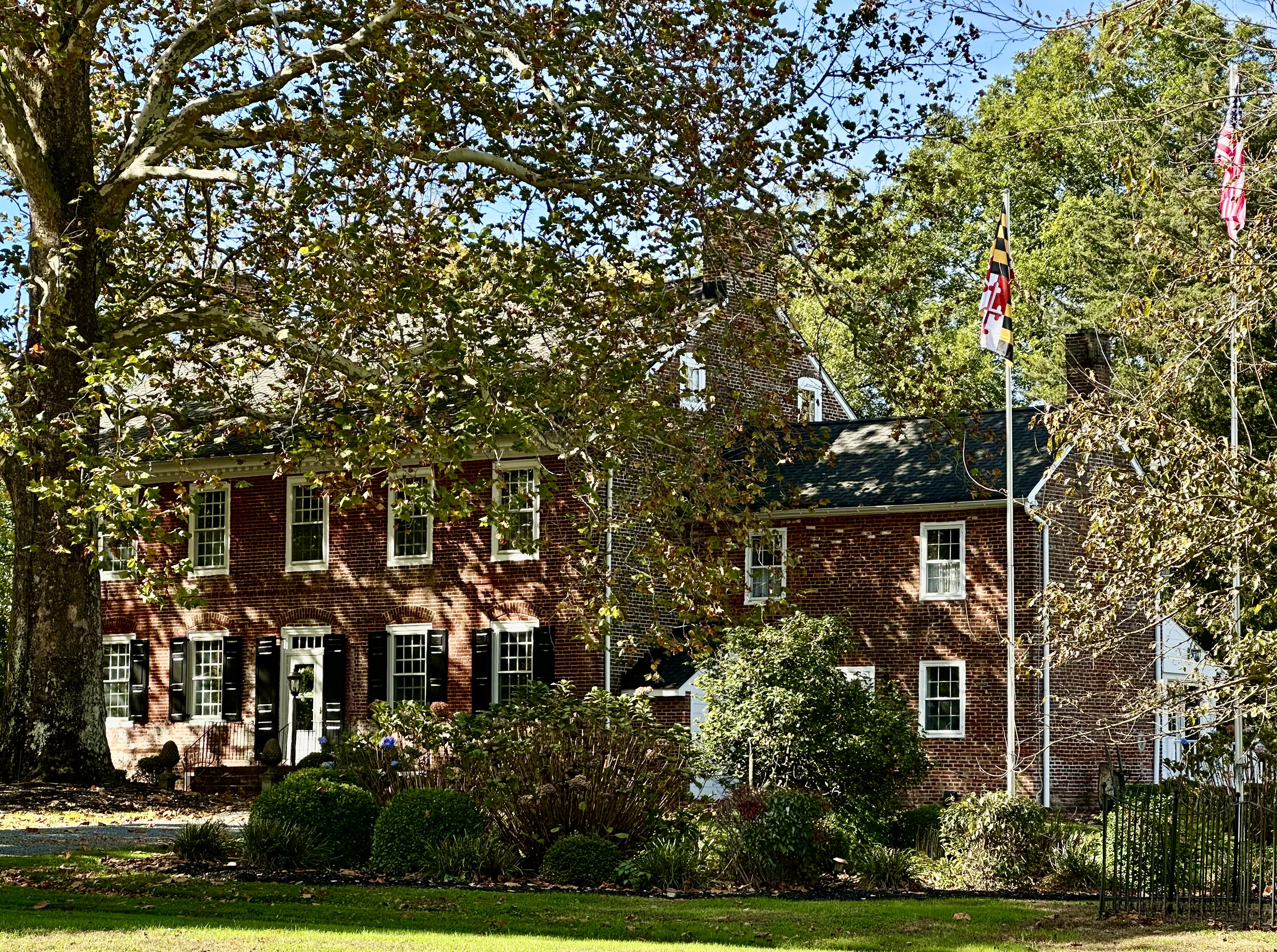
- Worsell Manor, October 2025

- Location within Maryland Location within the United States
- Location: 555 Worsell Manor Road, Warwick, Maryland
- Coordinates: 39.426694°N 75.824861°W
- Built: ca. 1760-1930
- Architectural style: mid-Georgian vernacular
- NRHP reference No.: 100009275
- Added to NRHP: August 31, 2023

Worsell Manor is a historic home and farm complex located at Warwick, Cecil County, Maryland. The house was built between about 1760 and 1780, and is a 2 1/2-story, five bay by two bay, brick dwelling reflecting mid-Georgian vernacular architecture. It has a 2 1/2-story addition that is three bays by two bays. Also on the property is a timber frame barn and granary, two concrete silos, a concrete block dairy, and a pole shed.

It was listed on the National Register of Historic Places in 2023.
