= French–England House =

Historic house in Arkansas, United States

- U.S. National Register of Historic Places
- U.S. Historic district – Contributing property
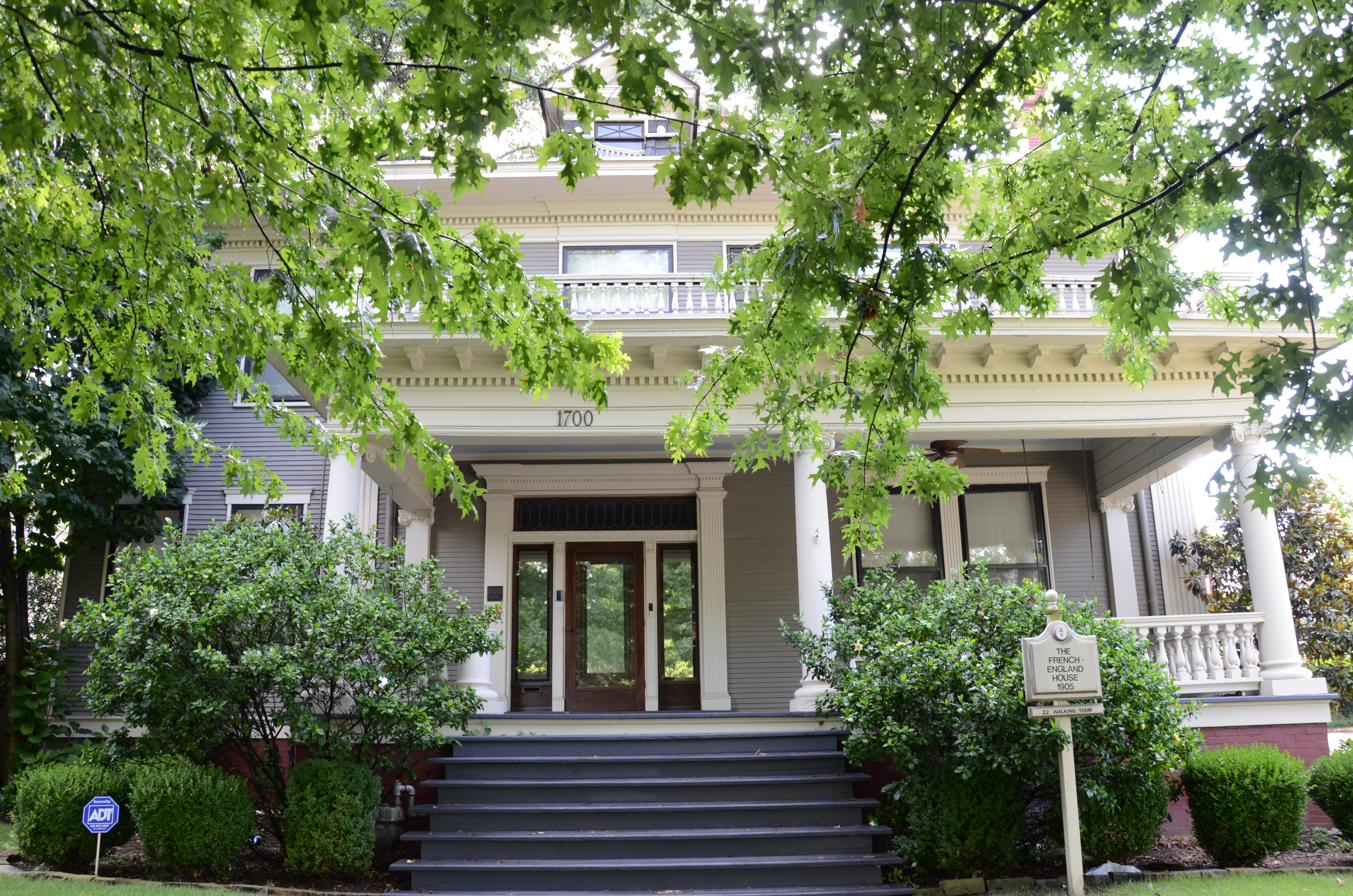

- Location within Arkansas Location within the United States
- Location: 1700 Broadway, Little Rock, Arkansas
- Coordinates: 34°43′58″N 92°16′42″W
- Area: less than one acre
- Built: 1900
- Architect: Charles L. Thompson
- Architectural style: Colonial Revival
- Part of: Governor's Mansion Historic District (1988 enlargement) (ID88000631)
- MPS: Thompson, Charles L., Design Collection TR
- NRHP reference No.: 82000896

Significant dates
- Added to NRHP: December 22, 1982
- Designated CP: May 19, 1988

The French–England House is a historic house at 1700 Broadway in Little Rock, Arkansas. It is a large and elaborately decorated two story American Foursquare house, with a tall hip roof with flared eaves, narrow weatherboard siding, and a high brick foundation. A single-story porch extends across much of the front, with Ionic columns and a modillioned and dentillated cornice. The house was designed by noted Arkansas architect Charles L. Thompson, and was built in 1900.

The house was listed on the U.S. National Register of Historic Places in 1982 for its architecture.

== See also ==
- National Register of Historic Places listings in Little Rock, Arkansas
