= Earleville, Maryland =

Unincorporated community in Maryland, United States

- Unincorporated community
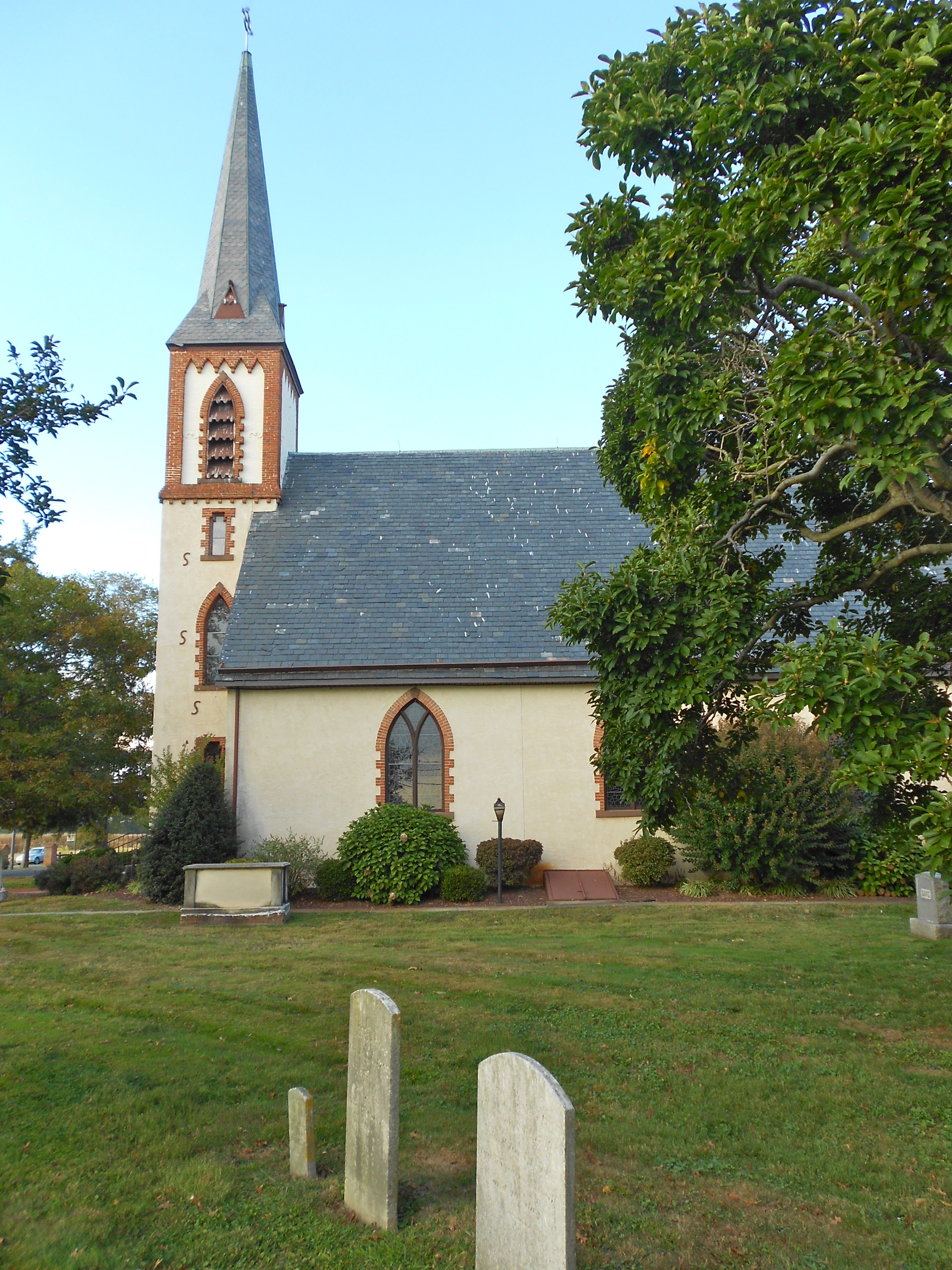
- St. Stephen's Episcopal Church in Earleville

- Location within the State of Maryland Earleville (the United States)
- Coordinates: 39°24′55″N 75°55′03″W
- Country: United States
- State: Maryland
- County: Cecil
- Elevation: 85 ft (26 m)
- Time zone: UTC-5 (Eastern (EST))
  - Summer (DST): UTC-4 (EDT)
- ZIP code: 21919
- Area codes: 410, 443, and 667
- GNIS feature ID: 584214

Earleville is an unincorporated community in Cecil County, Maryland, United States. Earleville is located at the intersection of Maryland Route 282 and Grove Neck Road west of Cecilton.

Located at Earleville and listed on the National Register of Historic Places are: Bohemia Farm, Mount Harmon, Rose Hill, and St. Stephen's Episcopal Church.
