= Elf (yacht) =

- U.S. National Register of Historic Places
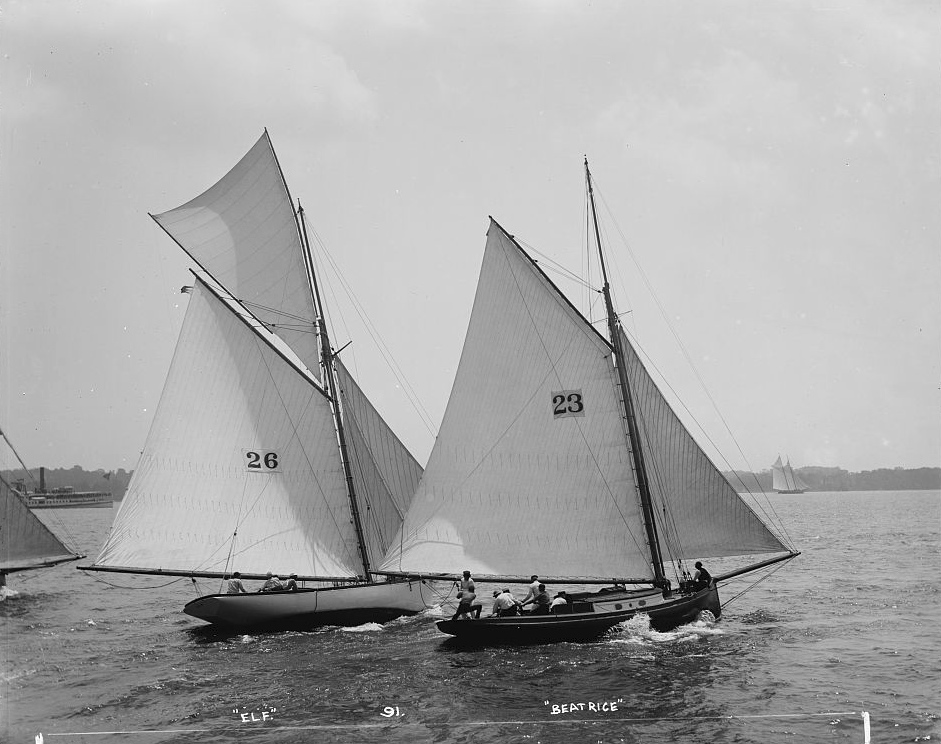
- The Elf (left) and the Beatrice in the 1890s

- Location within Maryland Location within the United States
- Location: Sassafras River, Fredericktown, Maryland
- Coordinates: 39°21′43″N 75°53′13″W
- Area: 0.1 acres (0.040 ha)
- Built: 1888
- Built by: Lawley & Sons; Lawley, George F.
- NRHP reference No.: 80001807
- Added to NRHP: March 26, 1980

Elf is a racing yacht built in 1888 by George Lawley & Son of South Boston, Massachusetts, for William H. Wilkinson. She was designed by George F. Lawley and is the oldest small yacht in the United States. She is located at the Chesapeake Bay Maritime Museum in St. Michaels, MD.Talbot County, Maryland.

She was listed on the National Register of Historic Places on March 26, 1980.

== Restoration ==
The Elf racing yacht was restored in 1991 by the Classic Yacht Restoration Guild, founded by Rick Carrion. Carrion purchased the yacht in 1971, though the restoration formally began in 1991. From 1991 to 2001, the CYRG repaired the futtocks and overall structure of the ship. The futtocks are the curved pieces of wood that form the lower frame of a yacht. In 2001, they added the shudder plank, marking the completion of the hull. In 2004, the restoration personnel repaired the interior and auxiliary. This meant the hull and interior were completed, leaving the deck to be repaired, which was finished within a year. Finally, in 2006, the spars and rigging were added, completing the most important parts of the restoration. Throughout the process, two interesting things stuck out to the restoration crew. They noted it had unique iron timbers for the floor, which were meant to prevent hogging and allow the yacht to keep its shape. Also, its appearance has kept interest for over a century. After the restoration, Elf set sail for a trial trip on July 16, 2008. The trip was to the Independence Seaport Museum. In June of 2009, the yacht was returned to New England. Further, in 2010, it participated in the Sailing Hall of Fame Race. [3]

=== Personnel ===
Throughout the process, four individuals worked on the yacht, excluding Rick Carrion. These were Graham Ero, the boatwright; John Griffiths, a consultant; Kurt Hasselbach, an M.I.T. consultant; and Peter Vemelia, a representative from the Mystic Seaport Museum. While there were workers on the yacht, there were also many benefactors helping the restoration fund. These included the Maryland Historical Trust, Cecil County Historical Trust, The Classic Yacht Restoration Guild, Gus and Veda Van Lennep, and Peter R Kellogg.[3]

=== Dimensions ===
The Elf's length at the waterline is 28 feet and 8 inches, the length on deck is 35 feet, and the overall length is 68 feet when estimated with the bowsprit and boom. The displacement of the steel keel is 6,700 pounds with the hull, and the displacement of the lead keel is 9,600 pounds plus the hull. The draft -- the distance between the waterline and the deepest part of the boat -- is 6 feet and 6 inches. The rig is a high-gaff topsail cutter. The sail area of one sail is 1,397 square feet. The area of the second sail is 1,681 square feet.[3]

=== Woods ===
The Elf Yacht was built with 16 different woods, all of which were used for the restoration. These woods are as follows:

1. Angelique (Dicorynia quianensis)

Angelique is a dense hardwood. It was used for the skylight, forward hatch, cockpit, companionway, and the yacht’s cap trim. The Philadelphia Ship Preservation Guild donated the wood for the project.

2. Ash (Traxinus americana)

Ash wood is a stronger wood and was used for the galley faucet. This was sourced from a farm belonging to Rick Carion’s farm in Cecil County, Maryland.

3. Atlantic Northern White Cedar (Chamaecyparis thyoides)

A lightweight soft wood that expands when wet. The White Cedar Wood was used for stopwaters and mastwedges, and sourced in coastal New Jersey.

4. Black Locust (Robinia pseudoacacia)

Black Locust wood is extremely rot-resistant and very strong. It was used for the futtocks, stem, rudder, knees, deck beams, cleats, mast partners, transom, transom cowering board, anchor locker, sampson posts, corner posts, tank supports, and the tiller. It was harvested from Tick Carion’s farm.

5. Chestnut Oak (Quercus prinus)

A strong and rot-resistant wood. It was used for the galley, head, king planks, and deck hangers below coverings. It was taken from a tree on the north shore of the Sasafrass River.

6. Cypress (Cupressaceae)

Cypress is strong, rot-resistant, and has long fibers. It was used for the interior hull ceiling and was found in Eastern Carolina.

7. Eastern Red Cedar (Juniperus virginiana)

Red Cedar wood has excellent decay resistance and was used for the compartments around the engine. It was harvested from Carion’s farm.

8. Lignum Vitae (Guaiacum officinale)

A very dense hardwood that is also self-lubricating. It was used for turning block wheels.

9. Mahogany (Swietenia mahagoni)

Mahogany is a hardwood used for the compass box, and it was found in Honduras.

10. North American Black Cherry (Prunus serotina)

Black Cherry is known for its smoothness and straight grain. It was used for the interior cabinetry and figurehead. The restoration crew got this from Rick Carion’s farm, as they did many other woods.

11. Purple Heart (Peltogyne paniculata)

Dense, tropical, purple-colored hardwood. This was used for turning block spacers.

12. Sasafrass (Sassafras albidum)

Sassafras is a lightweight, pretty wood used for bunk boards below cushions in the main salon. Like many others, it was sourced from Rick Carion’s family farm.

13. Sitka Spruce (Picea sitchensis)

Sitka Spruce is very strong, light, and long-fibered. During the restoration, it was used for the mast, boom, gaff, bowsprit, topsail jack yard, and topsail club. It was sourced in Sitka, Alaska.

14. Southern Long Leaf Yellow Pine (Pinus palustris)

A strong, resinous wood that was used in 1888 in the original yacht. During restoration, it was used for the hull planking and was found in North Carolina’s northern range.

15. Western Douglass Fur (Pseudotsuga menziesii)

An old-growth with good traction, depending on the cut. It was used for the deck planking and sourced from Oregon and Washington state.

16. White Oak (Quercus alba)

White Oak is a durable hardwood generally used when building boats. It was used for the king plank and covering boards. The wood was sourced on the north shore of the Sassafras River.[3]
