= Elisha Kirk House =

Historic house in Maryland, United States

- U.S. National Register of Historic Places
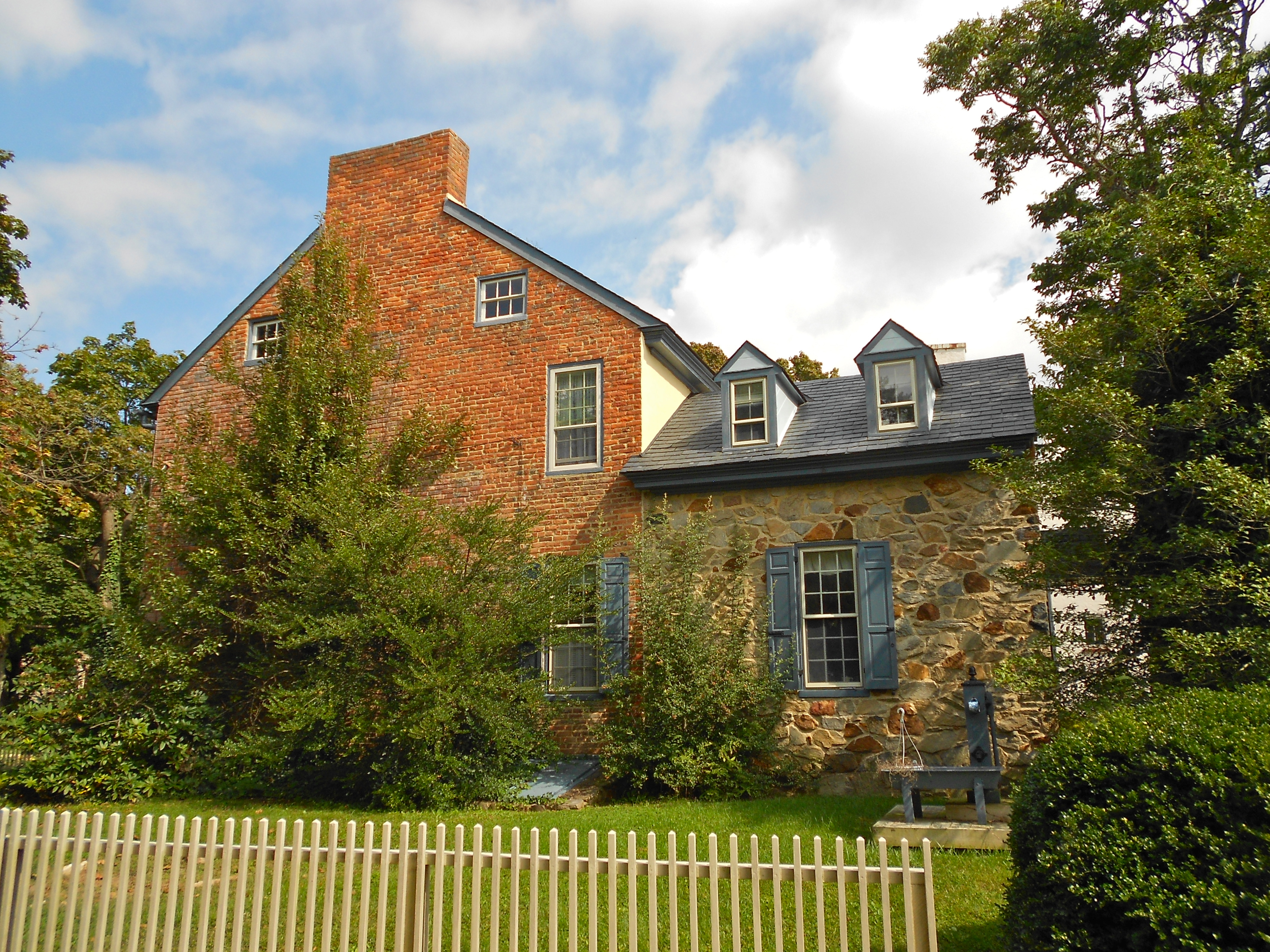
- Elisha Kirk House, September 2013

- Location within Maryland Location within the United States
- Location: 18 Cross Keys Road, Calvert, Maryland
- Coordinates: 39°41′55″N 75°59′4″W
- Area: 0.6 acres (0.24 ha)
- Built: c. 1813
- Architectural style: Federal
- NRHP reference No.: 82002809
- Added to NRHP: July 21, 1982

Elisha Kirk House is a historic home located at Calvert, Cecil County, Maryland, United States. It is a two-story, Federal-style brick house built about 1813, five bays wide and two deep, with a new stone wing. The house features a one-story, flat-roofed portico with four Doric columns.

During the period of 1867 through the mid-1880s, Mary E. Ireland and her family lived at the Elisha Kirk House.

The Elisha Kirk House was listed on the National Register of Historic Places in 1982.
