= Hopewell (Providence, Maryland) =

Historic house in Maryland, United States

- U.S. National Register of Historic Places
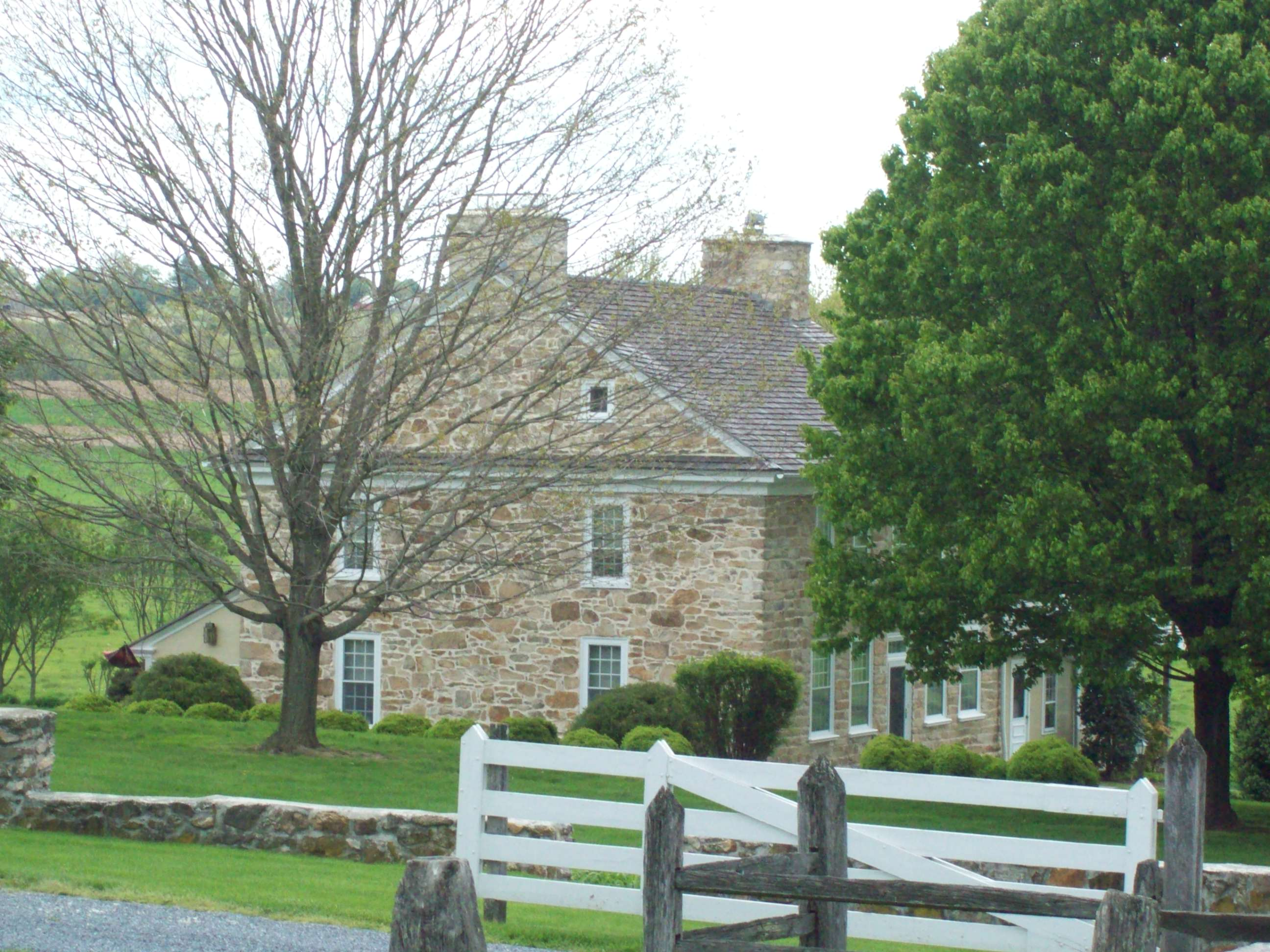
- Hopewell, Providence, MD, April 2010

- Location within Maryland Location within the United States
- Location: Northwest of Providence at 594 Little Elk Creek Road, Providence, Maryland
- Coordinates: 39°42′49″N 75°54′8″W
- Area: 3 acres (1.2 ha)
- NRHP reference No.: 79001120
- Added to NRHP: May 9, 1979

Hopewell is a historic home located at Providence, Cecil County, Maryland. It is a 2 1/2-half story, mid-18th-century stone structure with a gable roof. It is one of the earliest farmhouses still standing in the broad Elk Creek valley.

It was listed on the National Register of Historic Places in 1979.
