= Warwick, Maryland =

Unincorporated community in Maryland, United States

- Unincorporated community
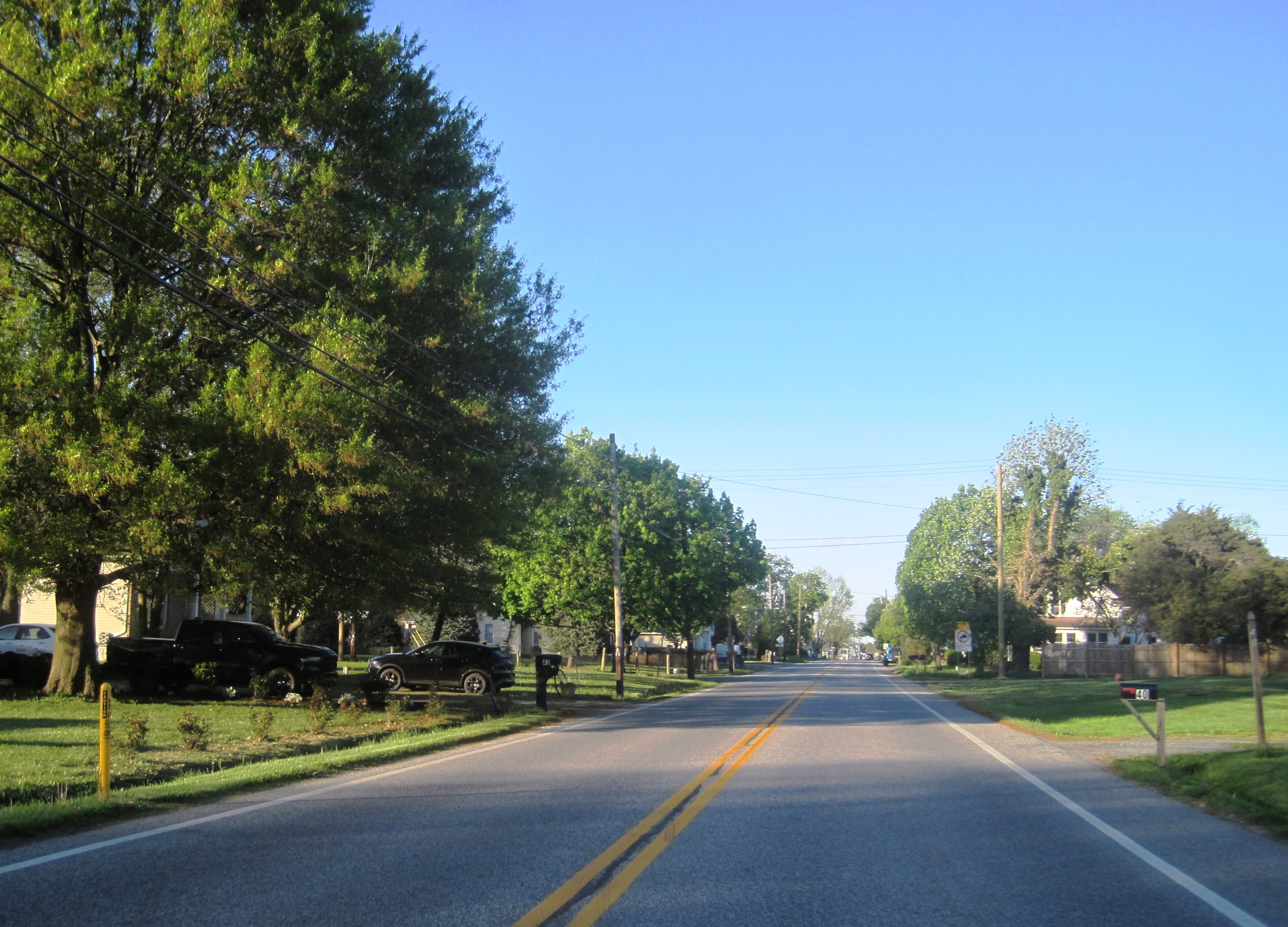
- Looking east on Maryland Route 282 in Warwick

- Location within the State of Maryland Warwick (the United States)
- Coordinates: 39°25′00″N 75°46′42″W
- Country: United States
- State: Maryland
- County: Cecil
- Elevation: 69 ft (21 m)
- Time zone: UTC-5 (Eastern (EST))
  - Summer (DST): UTC-4 (EDT)
- ZIP code: 21912
- Area codes: 410, 443, and 667
- GNIS feature ID: 588059

Warwick is an unincorporated community in Cecil County, Maryland, United States. Warwick is located along Maryland Route 282 east of Cecilton and just west of the Delaware border. St. Francis Xavier Church and Worsell Manor are listed on the National Register of Historic Places.

== Notable person ==
- Al Burris, baseball player
