= Zion, Maryland =

Unincorporated community in Maryland, United States

- Unincorporated community
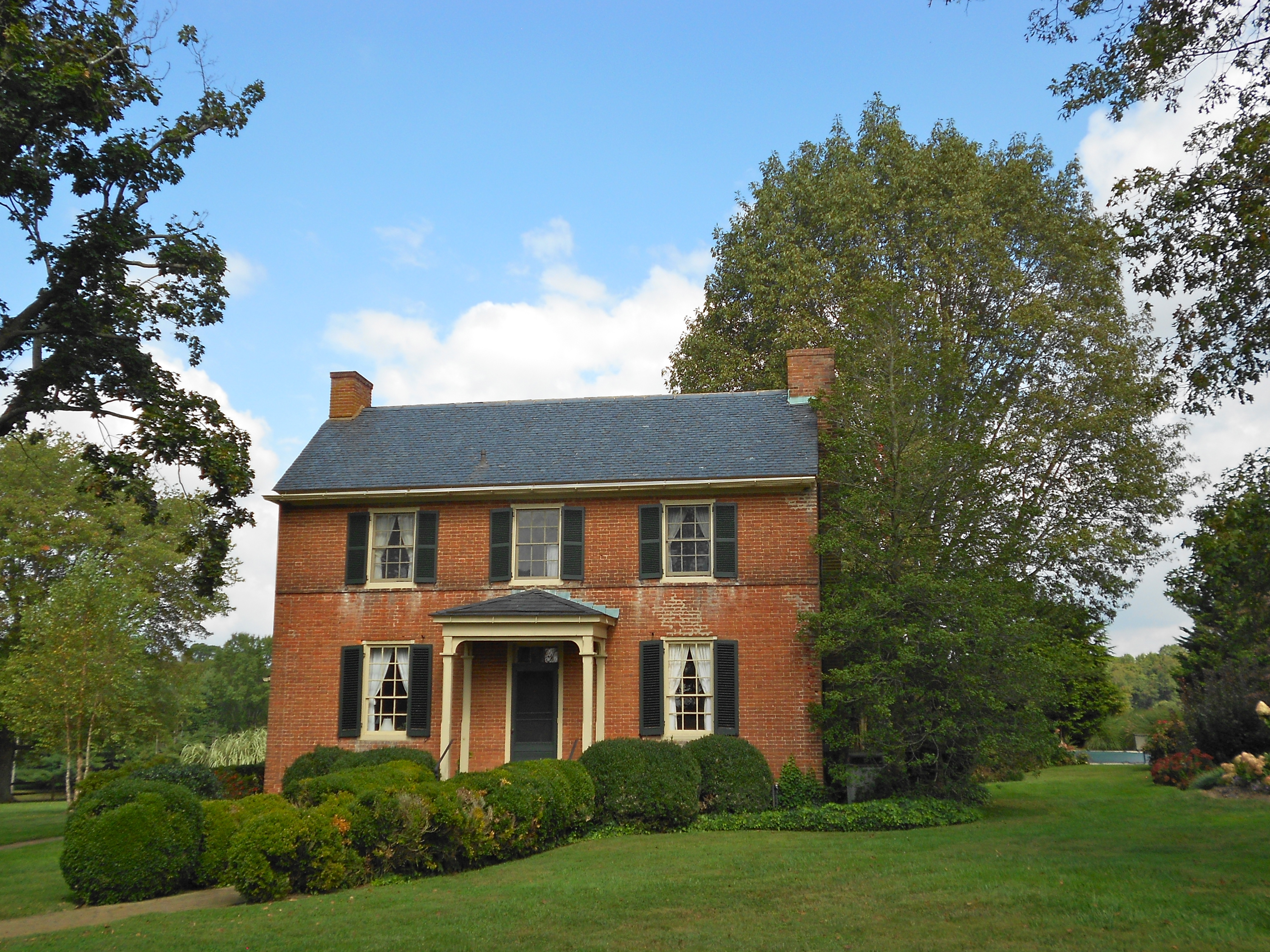
- The Isaac England House near Zion

- Location within the State of Maryland Zion (the United States)
- Coordinates: 39°40′32″N 75°57′54″W
- Country: United States
- State: Maryland
- County: Cecil
- Time zone: UTC-5 (Eastern (EST))
  - Summer (DST): UTC-4 (EDT)

Zion is an unincorporated community in Cecil County, Maryland, United States. The Isaac England House was listed on the National Register of Historic Places in 1980.
