= John Churchman House =

Historic house in Maryland, United States

- U.S. National Register of Historic Places
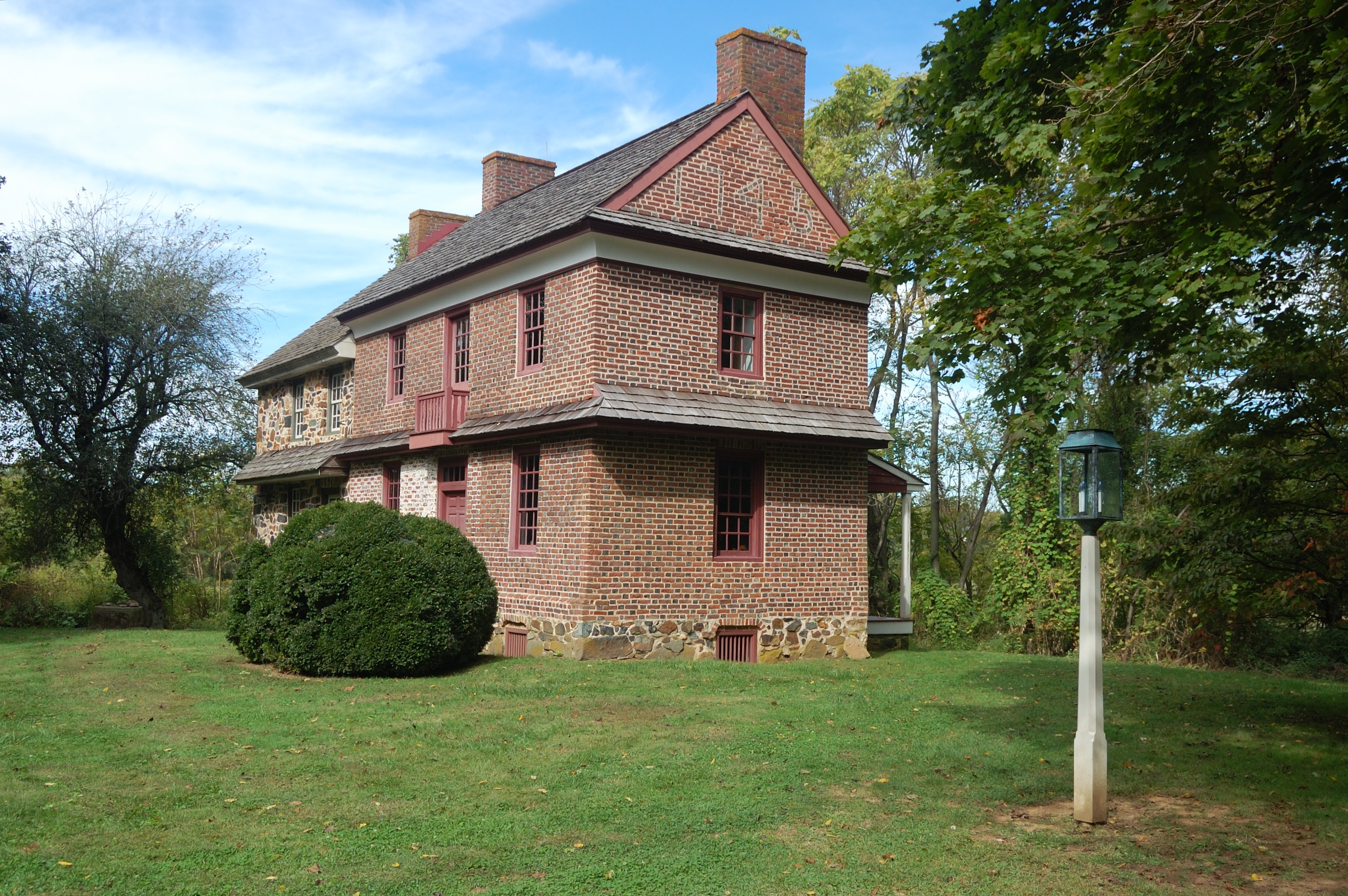

- Location within Maryland Location within the United States
- Location: 115 Churchman Ln., Calvert, Maryland
- Coordinates: 39°42′46″N 75°58′36″W
- Area: 35 acres (14 ha)
- Built: 1745
- Built by: Churchman, John, Jr.; Churchman, George
- Architectural style: Pennsylvania Quaker style
- NRHP reference No.: 86002337
- Added to NRHP: September 11, 1986

John Churchman House is a historic home located at Calvert, Cecil County, Maryland, United States. It consists of two distinct sections: a two-story, three-bay, gable-roofed brick house laid in Flemish bond dated to 1745; and a two-story, two-bay, gable-roofed house built in 1785 of uncoursed fieldstone. It was home to several generations of the locally prominent Churchman family, a number of whose members were important in the religious and educational history of Maryland-Pennsylvania Quakers in the 18th century.

The John Churchman House was listed on the National Register of Historic Places in 1986.
