= England House (Little Rock, Arkansas) =

Historic house in Arkansas, United States

- U.S. National Register of Historic Places
- U.S. Historic district – Contributing property
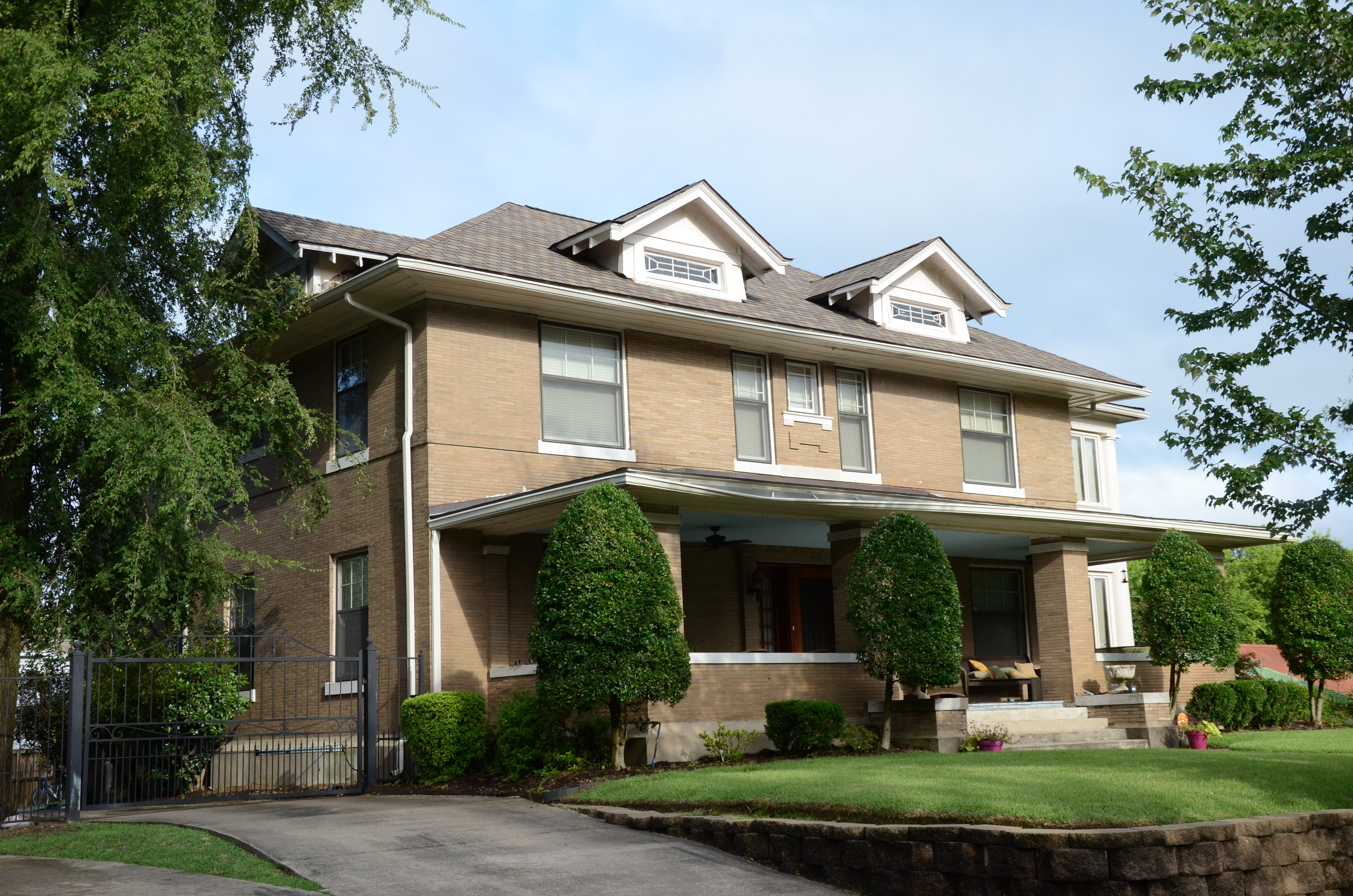

- Location within Arkansas Location within the United States
- Location: 2121 Arch St., Little Rock, Arkansas
- Coordinates: 34°43′41″N 92°16′46″W
- Area: less than one acre
- Built: 1914
- Architect: Charles L. Thompson
- Architectural style: Colonial Revival, Prairie School
- Part of: Governor's Mansion Historic District (ID88000631)
- MPS: Thompson, Charles L., Design Collection TR
- NRHP reference No.: 82000886

Significant dates
- Added to NRHP: December 22, 1982
- Designated CP: May 19, 1988

The England House is a historic house at 2121 Arch Street in Little Rock, Arkansas. It is a broad two-story brick building, capped by a hip roof with gabled dormers. The main facade has a porch extending across its facade, supported by large brick piers. Its basic form is reminiscent of the Prairie School of design, but the house has Classical elements, including its (now enclosed) south side porch, which is supported by large Tuscan columns. The house was built in 1914 to a design by architect Charles L. Thompson.

The house was listed on the National Register of Historic Places in 1982, and is included in Governor's Mansion Historic District.

== See also ==
- National Register of Historic Places listings in Little Rock, Arkansas
