= Calvert, Maryland =

Unincorporated community in Maryland, United States

- Unincorporated community
- Location within the State of Maryland Calvert (the United States)
- Coordinates: 39°42′01″N 75°58′57″W
- Country: United States
- State: Maryland
- County: Cecil
- Elevation: 456 ft (139 m)
- Time zone: UTC-5 (Eastern (EST))
  - Summer (DST): UTC-4 (EDT)
- ZIP code: 21911
- Area codes: 410, 443, and 667
- GNIS feature ID: 589876

Calvert is an unincorporated community in Cecil County, Maryland, United States, approximately six miles east of Rising Sun.

== History ==
The community was named for George Calvert, 1st Baron Baltimore. The center of the village is the Cross Keys Inn (Cross Keys Tavern) that was established there in 1774. Directly next to the Cross Keys Inn (which is now a private brick residence), is the Calvert Elementary School, operated by Cecil County Public Schools.

The main historical reference in a Calvert is the "East Nottingham Friends House" at this intersection. William Smallwood, a general during the Revolutionary War, used this building as a hospital for a short time in 1778, and several soldiers who died at the hospital are buried on its grounds.

== Attractions ==
The John Churchman House and Elisha Kirk House are listed on the National Register of Historic Places.

== Notable people ==
- Mary E. Ireland (1834-1927), author, translator
- Joseph Mendenhall (1920-2013), diplomat, was born in Calvert.
