= Little Elk Farm =

Historic house in Maryland, United States

- U.S. National Register of Historic Places
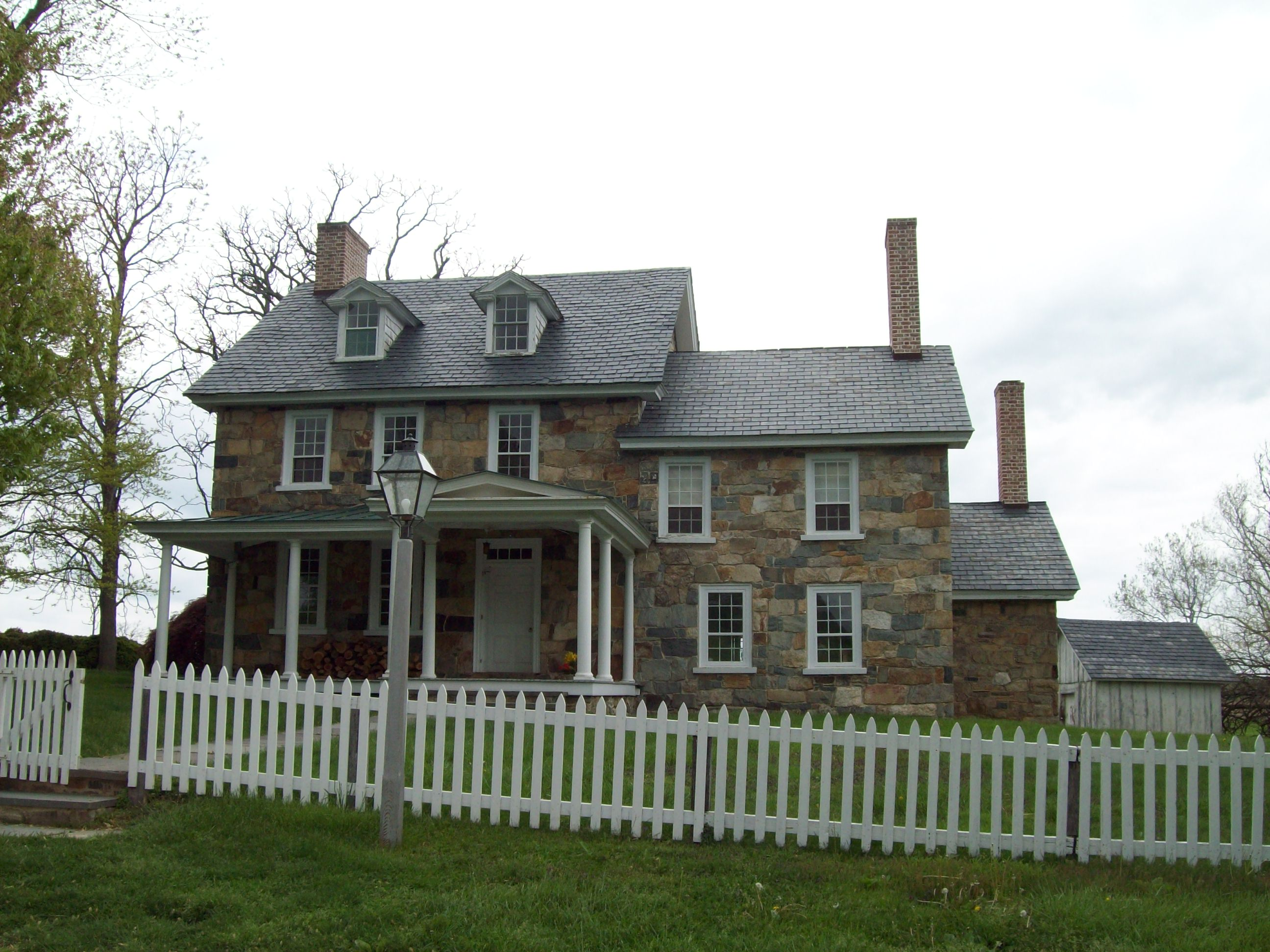
- Little Elk Farm, April 2010

- Location within Maryland Location within the United States
- Location: 392 Little Elk Creek Road, Providence, Maryland
- Coordinates: 39°42′29″N 75°54′7″W
- Area: 2 acres (0.81 ha)
- NRHP reference No.: 79001121
- Added to NRHP: May 9, 1979

Little Elk Farm, also known as Little Venture, is a historic home located at Providence, Cecil County, Maryland, United States. It is a late-18th-century 2 1/2-story, stone main section, with a smaller 1 1/2-story stone wing. A late-19th-century kitchen addition is attached to wing.

The Little Elk Farm was listed on the National Register of Historic Places in 1979.
