= Bohemia Farm =

Historic house in Maryland

- U.S. National Register of Historic Places
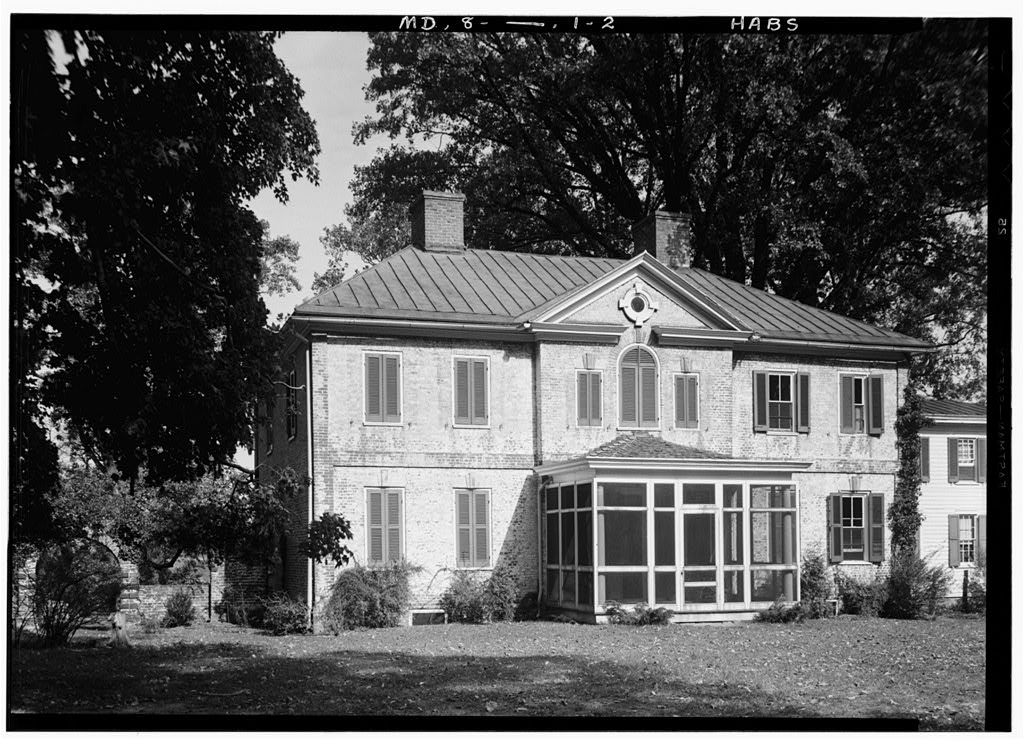
- Bohemia Farm land side in 1936

- Location within Maryland Location within the United States
- Location: 4920 Augustine Herman Highway; 1 mi. S of Bohemia River off U.S. 213, Earleville, Maryland
- Coordinates: 39°27′1″N 75°51′44″W
- Area: 130.2 acres (52.7 ha)
- Built: 1743
- Architectural style: Georgian
- NRHP reference No.: 73000912
- Added to NRHP: April 11, 1973

Bohemia Farm, also known as Milligan Hall, is a historic home located on the Bohemia River at Earleville, Cecil County, Maryland. It is a five bays wide, Flemish bond brick Georgian style home built about 1743. Attached is a frame, 19th century gambrel-roof wing. The house interior features elaborate decorative plasterwork of the Rococo style and the full "Chinese Chippendale" staircase. It was "part-time" home of Louis McLane.

The estate was founded by Augustine Herman, a Bohemian-born cartographer from Mšeno.

Ephraim, the oldest son of Herman, was among the principal converts to the Labadist faith, a Frisian Pietist sect that practiced a form of Christian communism that emphasized asceticism, plain dress, gender equality, and universal priesthood. In 1683, Augustine Herman granted 3,750 acres (15 km2) of land to the Labadists to form a colony. The Labadist commune never managed to gain more than 100 settlers and ceased to exist after 1720.

It was listed on the National Register of Historic Places in 1973.
