= Isaac England House =

Historic house in Maryland, United States

- U.S. National Register of Historic Places
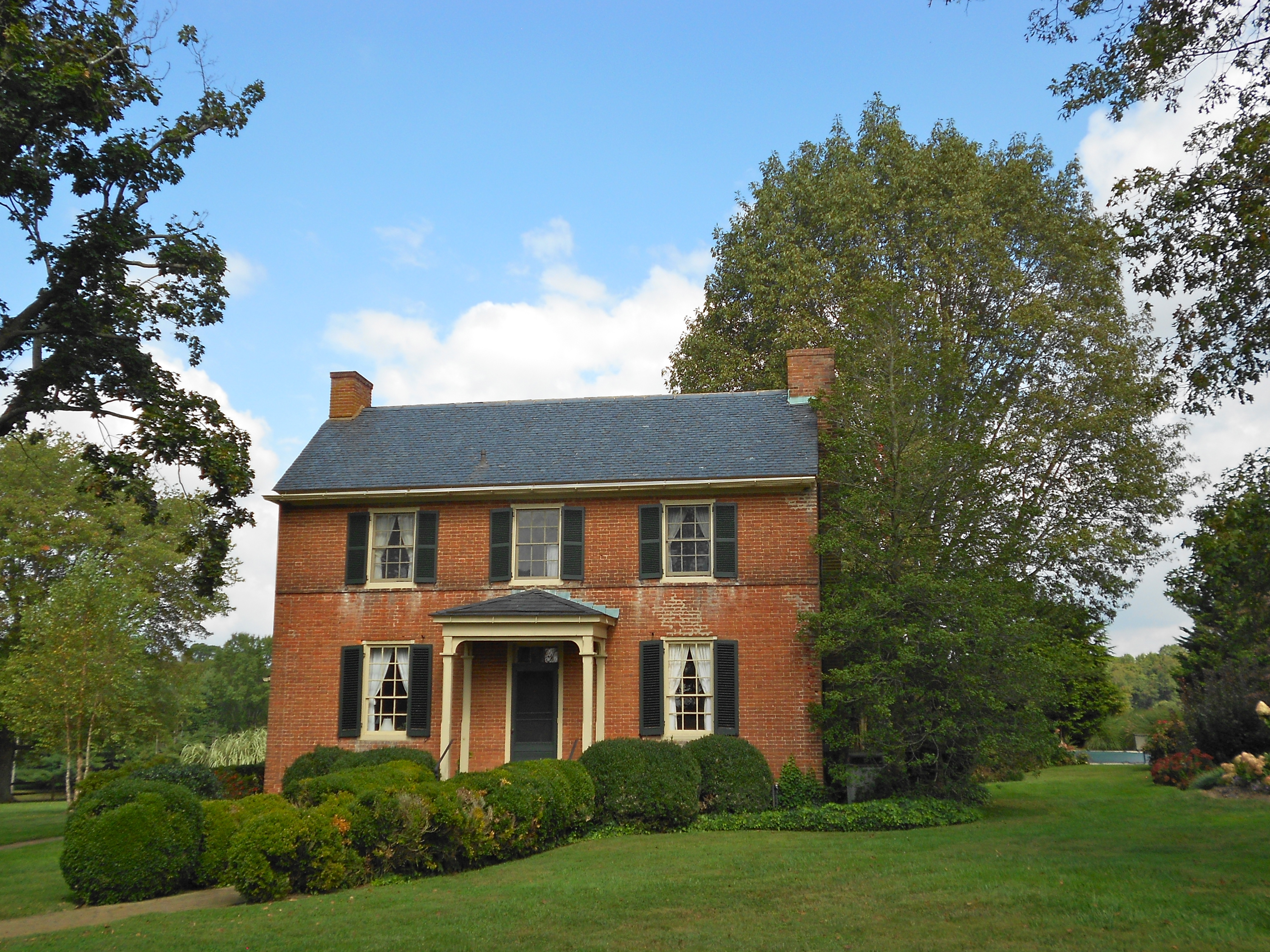
- House in 2013

- Location within Maryland Location within the United States
- Location: 1000 Crothers Road; 1 mile west of Zion on England Creamery Rd., near Zion, Maryland
- Coordinates: 39°40′29″N 75°59′8″W
- Area: 6 acres (2.4 ha)
- Architectural style: Georgian, Federal
- NRHP reference No.: 80001808
- Added to NRHP: March 20, 1980

Isaac England House is a historic home located near Zion, Cecil County, Maryland, United States. It is a 2 1/2-story Georgian central hall plan brick house three bays across by one room deep. The house features a slate roof of medium pitch, and a single-story screened porch.

The Isaac England House was listed on the National Register of Historic Places in 1980.
