= Mount Harmon =

Historic house in Maryland, United States

- U.S. National Register of Historic Places
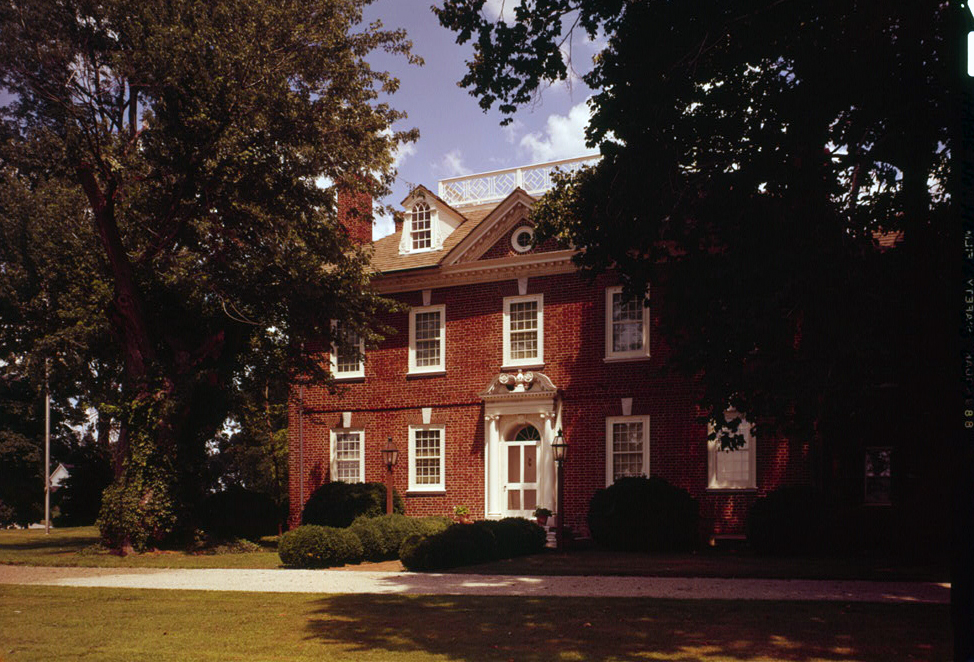

- Location within Maryland Location within the United States
- Location: 600 Grove Neck Road, Earleville, Maryland
- Coordinates: 39°23′2″N 75°56′29″W
- Area: 430 acres (170 ha)
- Built: 1788
- Architectural style: Georgian
- NRHP reference No.: 74000945
- Added to NRHP: June 5, 1974

Mount Harmon is an historic home, located at Earleville, Cecil County, Maryland, United States. It was listed on the National Register of Historic Places in 1974, and is currently open to the public.

== Style ==
Mount Harmon is an 18th-century brick mansion built by Sidney George around 1788. It features a central door with a scrolled pediment and pineapple keystone supported by Ionic pilasters. In the late 1920s a frame wing was built on the south gable.

== History ==
The Mount Harmon Plantation estate and nature preserve covers some 200-acre (0.81 km^{2}) adjacent to the Chesapeake Bay, on a peninsula by the north shore of the Sassafras River. The plantation was created in 1651 as a land grant from Lord Baltimore to Godfrey Harmon.

From 1750 to 1810 Mount Harmon flourished as a tobacco plantation owned by the Louttit and George families. Mount Harmon eventually fell out of family hands and into disrepair.

In 1963, Marguerite duPont de Villiers Boden, a direct descendant of the Louttits and Georges, rescued the plantation, restoring the Colonial Kitchen and Manor House. Mrs. Boden filled the house with 18th-century antiques, and restored the Tobacco Prize House as a reminder of the plantation's days as a tobacco shipping center for the Sassafras River area. After Mrs. Boden's death, her daughter Kip Kelso Boden Crist ensured the plantation's future by forming Friends of Mount Harmon, Inc.

== Friends of Mount Harmon ==
Today, the Friends of Mount Harmon (FOMH), almost all volunteers, preserve and interpret the plantation for the education and enjoyment of its visitors. FOMH conducts house and kitchen tours, hosts Colonial picnics, Yuletide tours, and special events, as well as operating educational programs for schools and maintain nature trails that wind around the property.

Mount Harmon gives water access to canoes, kayaks, and boats. The formal boxwood garden is used for weddings, and the spacious Manor House grounds are open for festive events and corporate meetings.
