= Crystal Beach, Maryland =

Unincorporated community in Maryland, United States

Crystal Beach, Maryland White Crystal Beach
- Unincorporated community
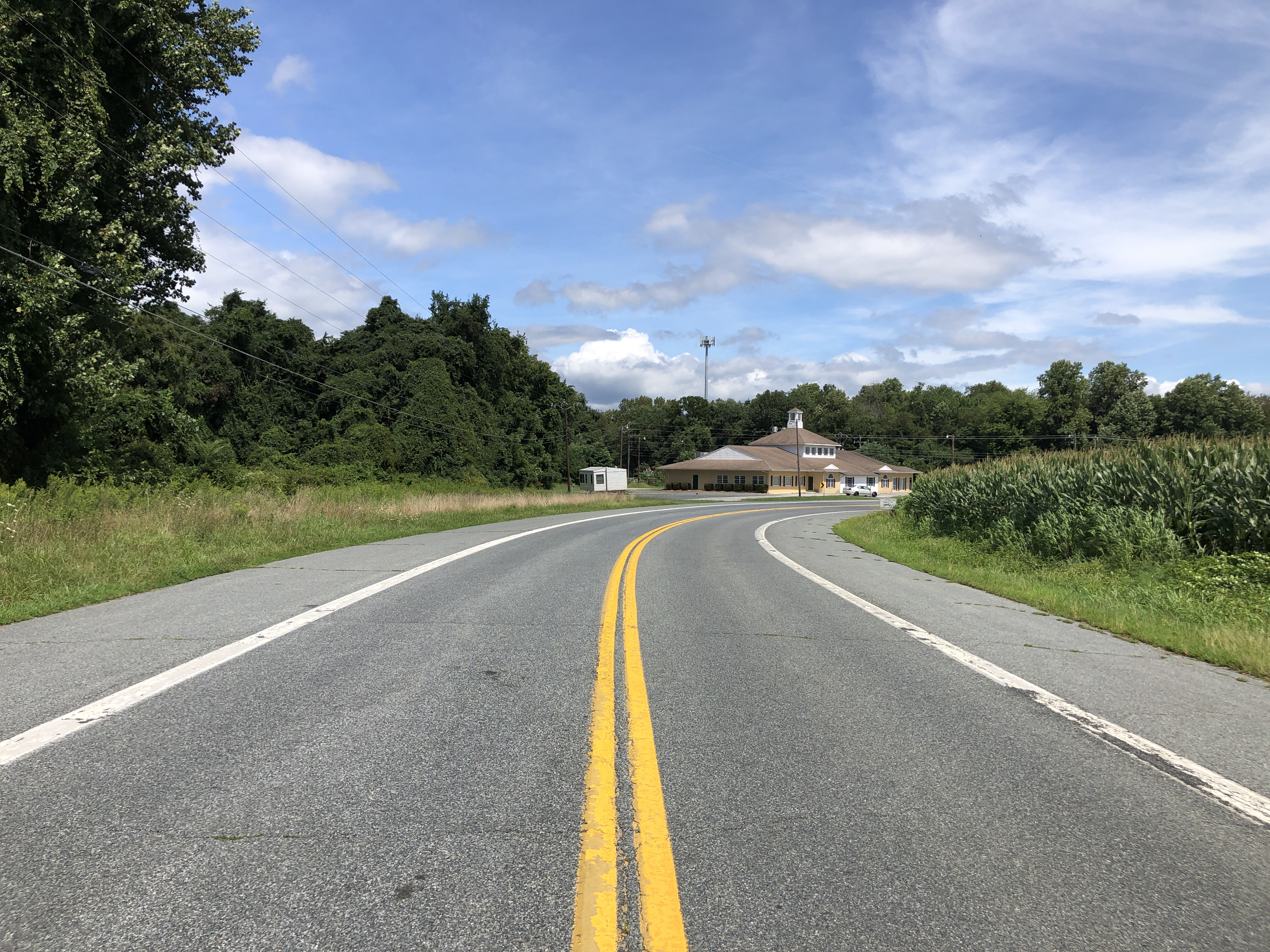
- Looking east along Maryland Route 282 in Crystal Beach

- Location within the State of Maryland White Crystal Beach (the United States)
- Coordinates: 39°26′30″N 75°58′29″W
- Country: United States
- State: Maryland
- County: Cecil
- Time zone: UTC-5 (Eastern (EST))
  - Summer (DST): UTC-4 (EDT)

Crystal Beach (also known as White Crystal Beach) is an unincorporated community in Cecil County, Maryland, United States.

Crystal Beach is a partnership between two brothers of the Green family. Kenneth "Gene" Eugene Green and Alfred "Dickie" Ernest Green (1933–2010). The community is inhabited seasonally with the majority of its inhabitants calling the Philadelphia metropolitan area their home. There are many large families there who have been frequenting the small private beach community for generations. Within the past five years, a small group of members have begun to coordinate events for the community to help raise funds to improve the quality of life at the small resort area. It is a prime location for boating and sunbathing.

White Crystal Beach was founded in the mid-1930s by Alfred Ernest Green and his wife Ethel Pearsey Green at the site of Reybold's Wharf. The Green family had formerly owned a traveling carnival, then small amusement parks in Wilmington, Delaware, Penns Grove, New Jersey, and Charlestown, Maryland. The Green family created a summer-only, private rental resort on the Elk River and named it "White Crystal Beach". The Green family built bathhouses, a dance hall, beer garden, bowling alley, and even a tattoo parlor. Children's amusement park rides and an antique merry-go-round were brought from the traveling carnival, and a few dozen simple wooden cottages were built as rental units. Ernest and Ethel brought in their son Kenneth Green (wife Edna) and daughter Ella Green Crump to help run the concessions and manage the business. Eventually they were joined by their grandchildren, William, Dorcas, and Alfred Crump, along with "Gene", "Dickie", "Betty", and "Margie" Green, who all worked in various aspects of the family business. Alfred Ernest Green died in the late 1940s, and the management was passed on to his son Kenneth Green.

The early 1950s brought some changes with damage from Hurricane Hazel in 1954, and a devastating fire in 1955. Ethel Green and her daughter Ella Green Crump Spence bought the farm property abutting the northern property line to renovate for their retirement, but Ella died in 1957, and Ethel retired to her second home in Florida, where she died in 1959. The farm property was passed to Ella's children and became "Elkview Shores". White Crystal Beach was then owned by Kenneth and Edna Green and managed with the help of their two sons, Kenneth "Gene" Green and Alfred "Dickie" Green.

Alfred "Dickie" Green died in January 2010.
