= Rose Hill (Earleville, Maryland) =

Historic house in Maryland, United States

- U.S. National Register of Historic Places
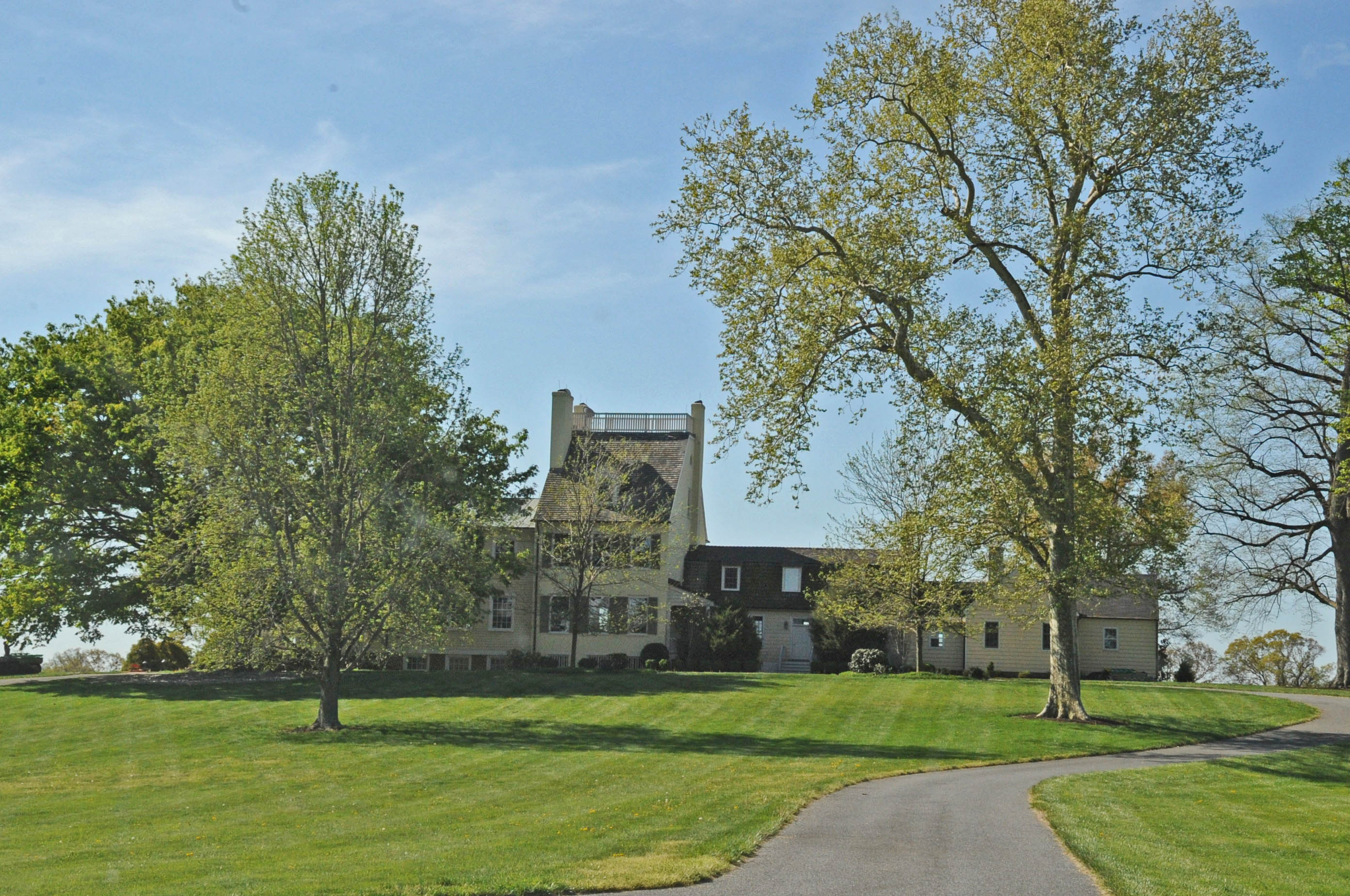
- Rose Hill, 2016

- Location within Maryland Location within the United States
- Location: 1100 Grove Neck Road, near Earleville, Maryland
- Coordinates: 39°23′23″N 75°57′18″W
- Area: 31 acres (13 ha)
- Built: 1837
- NRHP reference No.: 74000946
- Added to NRHP: November 5, 1974

Rose Hill, also known as Chance and Wheeler Point, is a historic home located at Earleville, Cecil County, Maryland, United States. It is the product of four major building periods: a gambrel-roofed frame structure built at the end of the 18th or beginning of the 19th century; a 2 1/2-story brick "town house" constructed on the east in 1837; and a small frame kitchen and a one-story wing built in the 1960s. Also on the property are a smokehouse, ice house, and shed. The garden includes two of the largest yew trees living in the United States. It was the home of General Thomas Marsh Forman (1756–1845), who served as a young man in the American Revolutionary War.

Rose Hill was listed on the National Register of Historic Places in 1974.

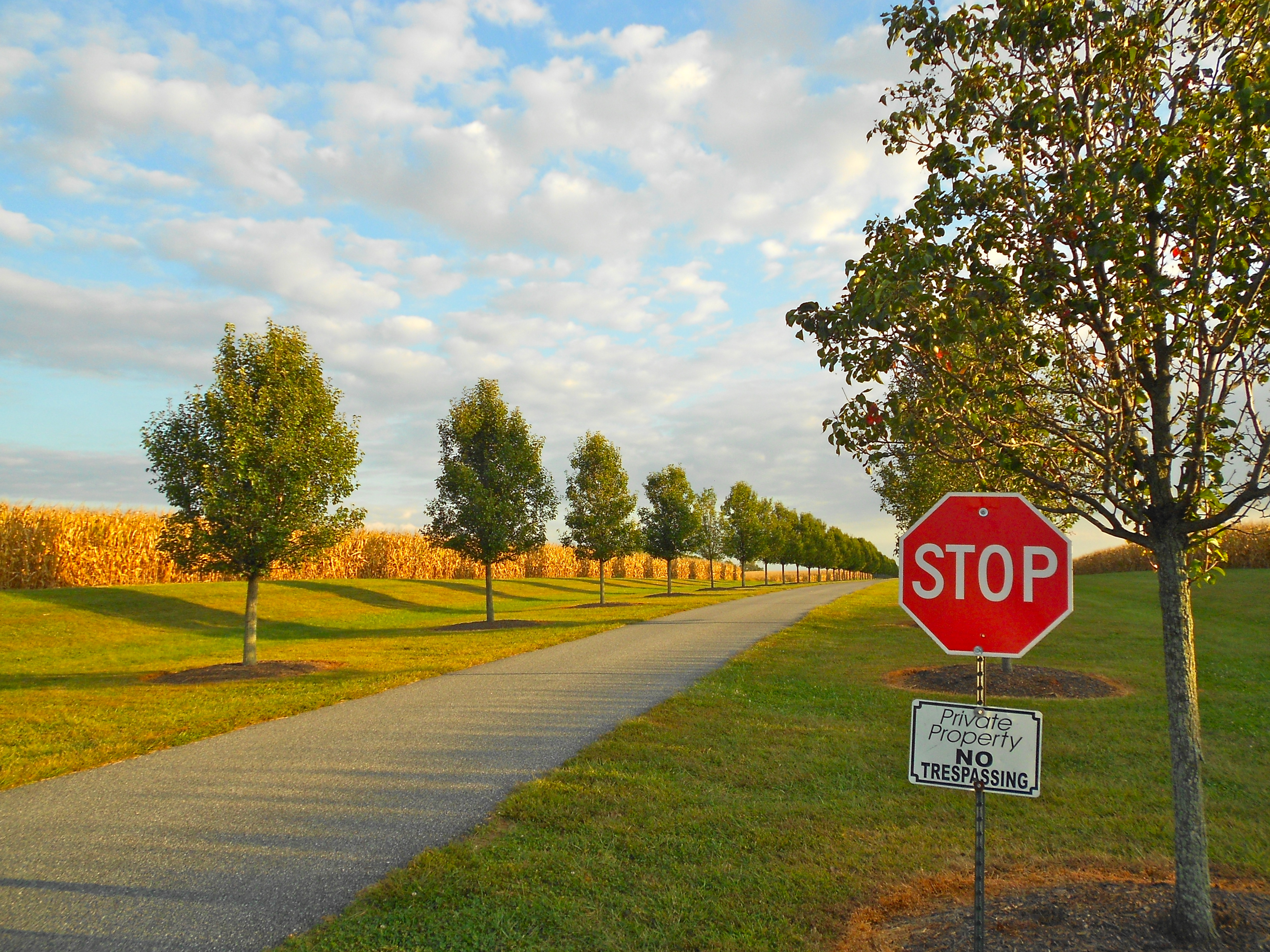
Entrance in 2013
