= Providence, Cecil County, Maryland =

Unincorporated community in Maryland, United States

Providence, Maryland
- Unincorporated community
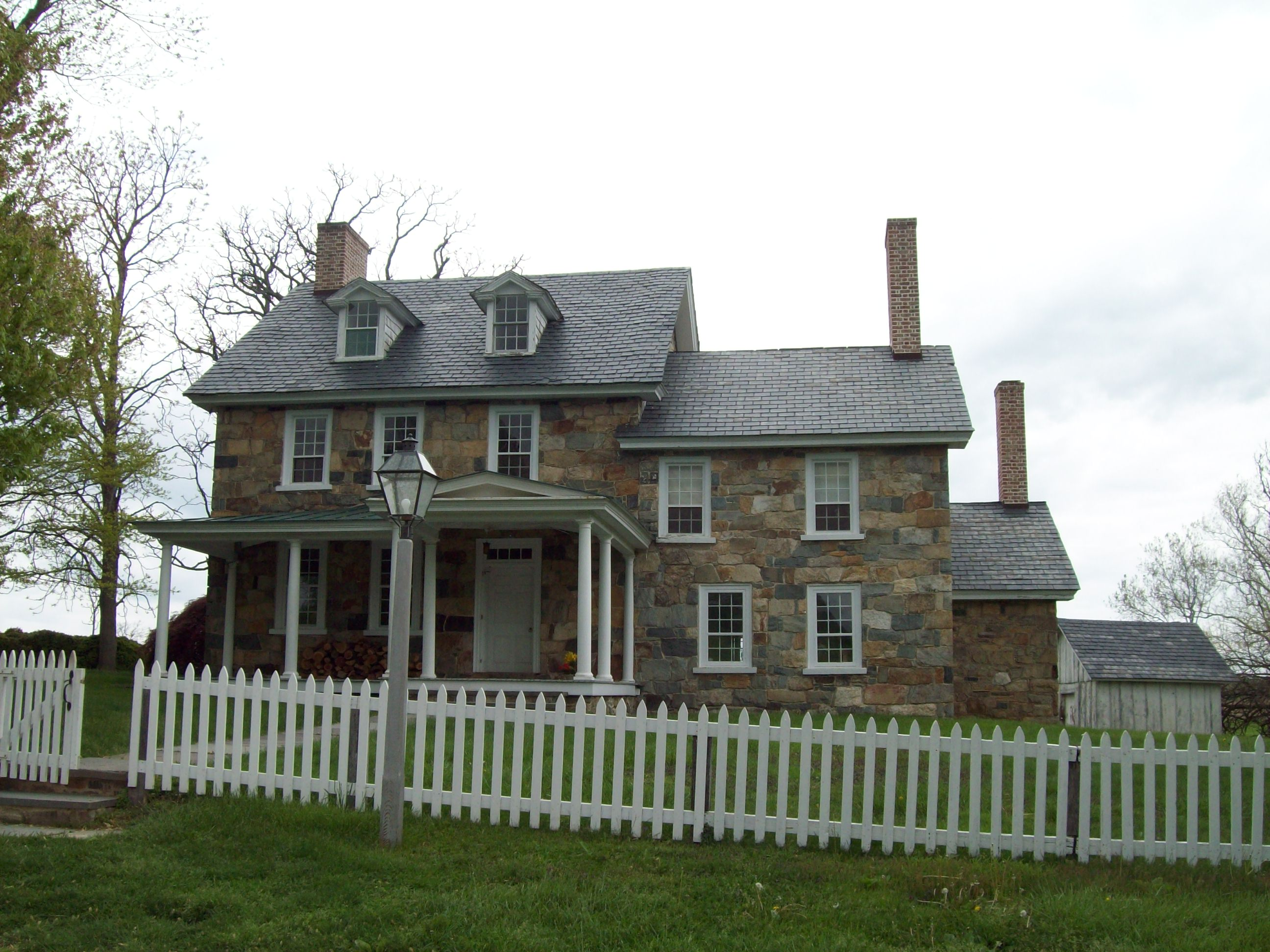
- Little Elk Farm in Providence

- Location within the State of Maryland Providence (the United States)
- Coordinates: 39°41′25″N 75°52′34″W
- Country: United States
- State: Maryland
- County: Cecil
- Time zone: UTC-5 (Eastern (EST))
  - Summer (DST): UTC-4 (EDT)

Providence is an unincorporated community in Cecil County, Maryland, United States. Hopewell and Little Elk Farm were listed on the National Register of Historic Places in 1979.
