= St. Francis Xavier Church (Warwick, Maryland) =

Historic church in Maryland, US

- U.S. National Register of Historic Places
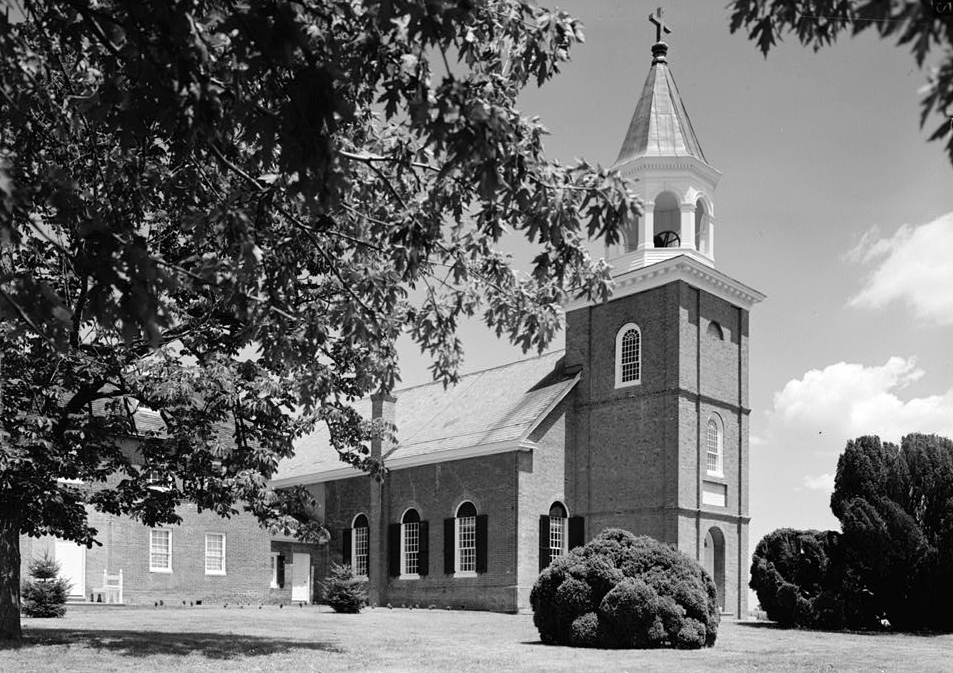

- Location within Maryland Location within the United States
- Location: 1445 Bohemia Church Road, Warwick, Maryland
- Coordinates: 39°26′16″N 75°48′12″W
- Area: 123.8 acres (50.1 ha)
- Built: 1792
- NRHP reference No.: 75000884
- Added to NRHP: October 10, 1975

St. Francis Xavier Church, or Old Bohemia, is a historic Catholic church in Warwick, Cecil County, Maryland, United States. It is located on what was once the Jesuit estate known as Bohemia Manor.

== History ==
Beginning in 1704 the Society of Jesus bought a farm and initiated missionary activities on the site, thereby establishing a second mission in Maryland half a century after the foundation of the Newtown Manor mission in St. Mary's County, Maryland.

A school here taught many distinguished early American Catholic leaders, including future archbishop John Carroll and his cousin, founding father Charles Carroll. Priests assigned to this mission evangelized in the Delmarva Peninsula, including the modern Archdiocese of Philadelphia and Diocese of Wilmington. Perhaps the most famous grave in the graveyard is of Catherine ("Kitty") Knight (1775–1855), credited for saving an elderly neighbor, a church and much of Georgetown, Maryland during the War of 1812, although her own house burned to the ground.

== Structure ==
The most historic properties on the site are a brick church, constructed shortly after the American Revolutionary War and dedicated in 1797, and an early-19th-century brick rectory connected by a one-story hyphen. The church consists of a four-bay-deep by three-bay-wide brick structure, with a 3-story brick tower added on the southwest facade of the church subsequent to its original building in 1792. The rectory is a five-bay-long, 2 1/2-story brick building with a two-bay-long hyphen on one end and a two-bay-long kitchen on the other. Also on the property is a public graveyard, as well as a relatively modern barn and farmhouse. A fire gutted the church's interior in 1912, but the church was rebuilt within the old walls. Regular services discontinued in the 1920s, but resumed in modern times. The Old Bohemia Historical Society, begun by a Catholic, a Quaker and a Methodist in 1954, bought the property's core 120 acres and now maintains the site.

The St. Francis Xavier Church was listed on the National Register of Historic Places in 1975.

== See also ==
- Joseph C. Cann, History of Saint Francis Xavier Church and Bohemia Plantation, Now Known as Old Bohemia, Warwick, Maryland (Old Bohemia Historical Society, 1976)
- Mary DeVine Dunn, Lillian DeVine, St. Francis Xavier Church, Warwick, Maryland, "Old Bohemia": Its History, the Burial Register: Historical Notes (DeWitt Publishing, 1966)
- List of Jesuit sites
