= Michael E. Busch =

American politician (1947–2019)

Mike Busch
- Busch in 2015

106th Speaker of the Maryland House of Delegates
- In office January 8, 2003 – April 7, 2019
- Preceded by: Casper Taylor
- Succeeded by: Adrienne A. Jones

Member of the Maryland House of Delegates
- In office January 14, 1987 – April 7, 2019
- Preceded by: Elmer Hagner; Robert Kramer
- Succeeded by: Shaneka Henson
- Constituency: District 30 (1987–2011); District 30A (2011–2019)

Personal details
- Born: Michael Erin Busch; January 4, 1947 Baltimore, Maryland, U.S.
- Died: April 7, 2019 (aged 72) Baltimore, Maryland, U.S.
- Party: Democratic
- Spouse: Cynthia Abbott (m. 1994)
- Children: 2
- Education: Temple University (BA)
- Nickname(s): Coach; Iron Mike

Michael Erin Busch (January 4, 1947 – April 7, 2019) was an American politician, teacher, and college football player who served as the 106th speaker of the Maryland House of Delegates from 2003 to 2019. A member of the Democratic Party, he represented the 30th district from 1987 to 2011, afterwards representing District 30A until 2019. The district encompassed parts of Anne Arundel County including the state capital of Annapolis.

Busch was born in Baltimore and raised in Annapolis. After graduating from St. Mary's High School, he played college football at Temple University, where he earned a Bachelor of Science degree in education. After graduating, he became a high school history teacher and sports coach at his alma mater. Busch was elected to the Maryland House of Delegates in 1986 and reelected in 1990, 1994, 1998, 2002, 2006, 2010, 2014, and 2018. In 2002, after House Speaker Casper R. Taylor Jr. lost reelection, Busch was elected Speaker, serving in this position until his death in 2019.

Busch was the longest-serving House speaker in the history of Maryland. During his tenure, Busch was a major opponent to Governor Bob Ehrlich's efforts to reform Maryland's medical malpractice laws and bring casino gambling to the state. He then helped pass many of Governor Martin O'Malley's priority bills, including strict gun control laws, the repeal of capital punishment, and the legalization of same-sex marriage in Maryland. He also oversaw increases to the state's education funding, environmental protections, and the expansion of health care coverage.

== Early life and education ==
Michael Erin Busch was born in Baltimore, Maryland, on January 4, 1947. He is of Irish descent.

Busch's father, Larry, was an successful attorney. In 1975, Larry, without explanation, abandoned his family and moved to Las Vegas, where he lived out his days as a small-time card sharp in casinos. After this, Busch's mother, Patricia Jean Busch, began working at the Maryland Motor Vehicle Administration and raised her three daughters as a single mother. Larry would not speak to his family again until 1990, when he called Mike, now a state delegate, to organize a family reunion. Larry Busch died on November 4, 1997.

Busch grew up in Glen Burnie before moving to Annapolis as a teenager. He graduated from St. Mary's High School, where he played football, basketball, and lacrosse. Busch's performance as a running back at St. Mary's caught the attention of Navy Midshipmen football coach Bill Elias, who wanted Busch to play alongside quarterback Roger Staubach. Busch didn't have the grades or will to enter the United States Naval Academy, which led Elias to suggest he attend Temple University. Busch did a prep year at Severn School before attending Temple, where he played as a running back for the Temple Owls football team for two seasons. During the 1967 season, he set Temple single-game records with 176 rushing yards on 38 carries against Bucknell, led the Mid-American Conference in rushing, and was named first team All-Conference and All-East. Busch was pursued by the New York Giants, Cincinnati Bengals, Dallas Cowboys, and Baltimore Colts as a running back; however, during Temple's 1968 season, he suffered a career-ending knee injury in the second game against Wayne State. Busch graduated from Temple with a Bachelor of Science in education in 1970.

== Career ==
=== Early career ===
After graduating from Temple in 1970, Busch unsuccessfully ran for the Maryland Democratic State Central Committee.

Busch worked as a history teacher and sports coach for St. Mary's High School from 1973 to 1979, afterwards working as the administrator for youth athletics for the Anne Arundel County Department of Recreation and Parks at the behest of Anne Arundel County executive Robert A. Pascal. Pascal was close friends with Busch's father and quickly became a mentor to Busch. In 2003, Busch was reported to the county Ethics Commission after receiving large raises from Anne Arundel County executive Janet S. Owens following the passage of legislation introduced by Busch that directed $250,000 in state funds toward new ballfields in the county. After the report, he requested an opinion from Attorney General J. Joseph Curran Jr.'s office, which ruled that the county could not restrict Busch's activities in the legislature. Anne Arundel County attorney Linda Schuett affirmed the attorney general's office's opinion, writing to ethics officials that any attempt to regulate Busch's actions in the General Assembly would constitute improper local interference with state government. Busch retired from the Recreation and Parks Department in December 2018.

=== Maryland House of Delegates ===
Busch ran unsuccessfully for the Maryland House of Delegates in District 30 in 1982, placing fifth in the 12-way Democratic primary. He ran for the seat again in 1986, placing third in the Democratic primary with 16 percent of the vote, and defeated Republican challengers John Hammond, David Kelly, and Frank McClanahan in the general election with 19.1 percent of the vote.

Busch was sworn into the Maryland House of Delegates on January 14, 1987. He was a member of the Judiciary Committee from 1987 to 1991, afterwards serving on the Economic Matters Committee until his election as speaker. He also served as a deputy majority whip during the 1993 legislative session. In February 1991, Busch was elected to serve as the chair of the Anne Arundel County Delegation, succeeding John Astle, who resigned as chair after being called up by the U.S. Marines to serve in Operation Desert Storm. He served as the delegation's chair until 1994. Busch was an early supporter of Casper R. Taylor Jr. in the 1994 speaker election, who then appointed Busch as the chair of the Economic Matters Committee in 1994. During his tenure as chair, Busch oversaw the passage of a 10 percent state income tax cut, environmental protection measures, and strengthened regulations of health maintenance organizations.

In the legislature, Busch gained a reputation as a steady if unspectacular lawmaker who rarely made mistakes. He was given the nickname "Coach" because of his background as a former high school football and basketball coach, his rugged appearance, and his conciliatory and compromising legislative style. Busch served as a mentor to several younger members of the legislature, including some Republicans, and would often deliberately leave his name off of legislation to avoid alienating people by seeming to forgo his role as a fair broker.

In November 1991, Busch joined a bipartisan group of legislators in filing a lawsuit against the state's congressional map. Busch opposed the map, saying that it improperly split established communities in Anne Arundel County, such as Crofton and Ferndale. A federal appeals court upheld the redistricting plan in a 2–1 ruling in December 1991, after which legislators appealed the ruling to the U.S. Supreme Court, which upheld the congressional map in an 8–1 decision in May 1992.

In 1999, Governor Parris Glendening appointed Busch to a task force to review the Injured Workers Insurance Fund (IWIF). During the 2000 legislative session, he introduced legislation to implement many of the task force's recommendations. The bill included a provision added by Busch that would exempt the IWIF from both public records and public meetings laws, which was removed from the final version of the bill. In May 2000, Busch told The Baltimore Sun that he was a finalist in the search for a new executive director of the IWIF, a position that would require him to resign from the Maryland House of Delegates. In June 2000, he announced that he had withdrawn as a candidate for the IWIF position and would continue serving in the legislature.

In the 2006 Maryland House of Delegates elections, the Maryland Republican Party targeted Busch and Virginia P. Clagett. Both delegates won re-election that year, with Busch placing first in the general election with 17.1 percent of the vote. The Republican Party targeted Busch and Clagett again in 2010, this time unseating Clagett while Busch won re-election. In 2014, Busch was redrawn into District 30A, where he won re-election alongside Republican incumbent Herbert H. McMillan.

=== Speaker of the House of Delegates ===
Busch presides over the Maryland House of Delegates, 2018

In May 2000, The Baltimore Sun described Busch as the frontrunner to become the next speaker of the Maryland House of Delegates should Casper R. Taylor Jr. leave the legislature. Taylor lost his re-election bid in the 2002 Maryland House of Delegates elections, after which Busch entered the race to succeed him. He faced competition from Pete Rawlings, who dropped out of the race and endorsed Busch after Busch announced that he had gained the support of a majority of the Democratic members of the House. House Democrats elected Busch to be the speaker of the Maryland House of Delegates on December 4, 2002. A few days later, he announced a series of leadership changes that increased the number of Black state delegates in key positions, including Adrienne A. Jones as speaker pro tempore and Dereck E. Davis as his successor as the chair of the House Economic Matters Committee. Busch also abolished the Commerce and Government Matters Committee and replaced it with a Health and Health Insurance Committee. He was officially sworn in as speaker on January 8, 2003.

Busch was a significantly more progressive speaker than Taylor, moving steadily to the left throughout his tenure. Sworn in as Republican Governor Bob Ehrlich took office, Busch quickly became the leading opponent to Ehrlich's push to bring casino gambling to Maryland, citing his personal opposition to slots and describing the governor's proposals as a giveaway to the racetracks. For the remainder of his governorship, Ehrlich was unable to forge a plan that Busch and his Senate counterpart, Thomas V. Miller Jr., could agree on, and legislation to legalize slots would not pass until his successor, Martin O'Malley, took office in 2007. Still, Busch continued to hold a negative view of gambling and is ability to alleviate the state's budget woes, holding firm in opposing the expansion of gambling to include casinos, including one likely to be located in Prince George's County, where Miller's district was located.

Lieutenant governor Anthony Brown, Senate president Thomas V. Miller Jr., Governor Martin O'Malley, and Busch at a bill signing ceremony, 2013

Busch shepherded through the House some of the O'Malley administration's major legislative initiatives, including strict gun control laws, the DREAM Act, the repeal of capital punishment, and the legalization of same-sex marriage in Maryland. He also oversaw increases to the state's education funding, environmental protections, and the expansion of health care coverage, and used his position in the Maryland General Assembly to push for local projects and causes in Anne Arundel County. He was a delegate to the 2012 Democratic National Convention, pledged to President Barack Obama.

In November 2014, following Larry Hogan's win in the 2014 Maryland gubernatorial election, Hogan met with Busch to discuss working together on several issues, including the state budget and health care. Throughout Hogan's governorship, the Maryland General Assembly was controlled by a Democratic supermajority, meaning that legislative leaders had to ensure bills passed by veto-proof majorities and had to schedule enough time for the legislature to override his vetoes on priority bills. During the 2015 legislative session, Busch and Hogan became involved in a standoff over the state budget, during which he refused to introduce Hogan's supplemental budget and Democrats moved to fence off millions in funds meant for state employee raises and aid to counties for education. In response, Hogan used his line-item veto to eliminate $2 million in funding from the capital budget for the Maryland Hall for the Creative Arts, a longtime recipient of state aid from Busch. Hogan's veto of the Maryland Hall funding was overridden at the start of the 2016 legislative session, along with several other bills including a bill to restore voting rights to felons on parole.

In December 2017, amid the MeToo movement, Busch ordered the Legislative Policy Committee to begin collecting data on sexual misconduct complaints against state lawmakers or their staff members. During the 2018 legislative session, he helped pass legislation to reform the sexual harassment policies in the Maryland General Assembly, which was signed into law by Governor Hogan.

In February 2019, after it was reported that state delegate Mary Ann Lisanti had described a district in Prince George's County as a "n----- district" in a conversation with another legislator, Busch opted to strip her of her committee assignments and send her to sensitivity training. He also held out the possibility of redemption for Lisanti, but added that it was "her responsibility to do so and earn back the trust of her colleagues". The Legislative Black Caucus of Maryland condemned Busch for not joining the bipartisan calls for her resignation, saying that he missed an opportunity to exhibit greater leadership in the immediate aftermath of the controversy.

Busch served as Speaker until his death on April 7, 2019, becoming the longest-serving House speaker in Maryland history.

== Political positions ==
=== Crime and policing ===
During the 1987 legislative session, Busch supported a bill that would have prevented the state from sentencing minors convicted of murder to death. In 1988, he voted against repealing the death penalty. During the 2013 legislative session, Busch oversaw the passage of a bill to repeal the death penalty in Maryland, which he called one of "the most compelling issues" in his tenure.

During the 1988 legislative session, Busch introduced legislation establishing mandatory minimum sentences of five years for individuals who use or possess a firearm while committing a drug trafficking crime and make doing so a felony.

During the 2010 legislative session, Busch introduced the Safe Schools Act, which would require courts to notify schools if a student is arrested for crimes that could indicate gang membership, such as assault and malicious destruction of property. During the 2018 legislative session, he supported a bill that would require a school resource officer or police coverage for every public school in Maryland.

During the 2014 legislative session, Busch supported a bill that would create a new pretrial services division that uses statistical analyses to determine whether a defendant should be held without bail or released. In April 2017, he declined to take up a bill that would have resurrected the bail system in Maryland, effectively leaving in place a Maryland Court of Appeals rules change that greatly limits the use of bail and instructs judges to use the "least onerous" conditions when setting bail for a defendant who is not considered a danger or a flight risk.

In May 2015, following the killing of Freddie Gray, Busch formed a legislative panel tasked with researching legislative proposals to improve public safety and policing practices in Maryland. The task force submitted its recommendations in January 2016, which included giving officers periodic psychological evaluations, allowing the public to attend police trial boards, and giving residents more time to file police brutality complaints. Busch praised Governor Larry Hogan's handling of the 2015 Baltimore protests. During the 2016 legislative session, Busch supported the Justice Reinvestment Act, which reformed the state's parole system, drug treatment policies, and expungement of criminal records, which passed and was signed into law by Governor Hogan. He also supported a package of bills that would provide at least $290 million in state funding to the city for revitalization projects, after-school programs, and college scholarships for poor students.

=== Development initiatives ===
In January 1996, after Cleveland Browns owner Art Modell proposed moving the football team to Baltimore, Busch drafted legislation that would divert any unused personal seat license (PSL) proceeds to stadium construction, saying that the money would otherwise "go into the pockets of the Browns' owner". Modell responded to the bill by saying he had "no intention of making a nickel in profits on the PSLs" and that "no one has to legislate that". The football team, now the Baltimore Ravens, formally opposed the bill, which did not pass. In February 1996, Busch supported Governor Glendening's push to use $273 million in state funding to build stadiums for the Ravens in Baltimore and the Washington Redskins in Prince George's County.

In November 1996, Busch signed onto a letter to city and county officials in Anne Arundel County asking them to approve a memorandum of understanding to halt development until a comprehensive transportation plan was created.

=== Education ===
During the 1997 legislative session, Busch supported a bill that would allow Anne Arundel County residents to elect members of its school board. He voted against a bill that would put three options to a county referendum to decide how members of the Anne Arundel County Board of Education should be selected.

During the 2000 legislative session, Busch opposed Governor Glendening's plan to provide $6 million in state funding to buy textbooks for private schools, saying the funding would create "a greater divide between those who have and those who have not". He also supported a bill that requires school systems to pay construction workers prevailing wages on certain construction projects.

From 2007 to 2015, Busch opposed bills to create state-funded private school scholarships. In March 2016, Busch hinted that his opposition to private school vouchers had softened after two African American lawmakers from Baltimore—Antonio Hayes and Keith E. Haynes—sponsored versions of the scholarship legislation. During the 2017 legislative session, he opposed legislation introduced by Governor Hogan that would expand the private school scholarships program and create a panel to approve new charter schools.

In November 2015, after budget analysts reported that Maryland would have a budget surplus of more than $500 million over the next two years, Busch called on Governor Hogan to release $68 million in additional funding for the state's most expensive school districts. Hogan refused to do so, after which Busch said that Hogan "has shown no concern for the welfare and the benefit of public school children."

During the 2016 legislative session, Busch introduced legislation establishing a matching funds program for Maryland's 529 plan program.

In January 2018, Busch criticized a proposal by Governor Hogan to create an investigator general position within the Maryland Department of Education, saying that the state's system of school boards, county governments, and county executives provided checks and balances to deal with the school system.

During the 2019 legislative session, Busch introduced the Blueprint for Maryland's Future, which included $725 million in education funding through fiscal year 2022, which would pay for school-based health centers, free school lunches for schools in impoverished areas, raises for teachers, and grants for improving teacher standards. The bill passed the Maryland General Assembly on April 3, 2019, and became law without Governor Larry Hogan's signature.

=== Environment ===
Busch, Senate president Thomas V. Miller Jr., and Governor Larry Hogan at the Annapolis City Dock, 2017

During the 1998 legislative session, Busch supported a bill sponsored by Governor Glendening to limit agricultural runoff through stiff deadlines and fines. In March 1998, he voted against a plan favored by House leadership that limited nitrogen and phosphorus runoff by 2003 and 2006, with fines for violators that would be excused if the state does not budget enough money to hire planners to help farmers draft runoff plans.

During the 1999 legislative session, Busch voted for a bill to extend the state's vehicle emissions testing program and remove a testing exemption for elderly motorists. In February 2007, he supported a bill introduced by Governor Martin O'Malley that would mandate dramatic reductions in carbon dioxide emissions from vehicles.

In March 2004, Busch endorsed a bill that would increase the requirement that electric companies generate some power from renewable energy sources from 1 percent to 7.5 percent by 2014.

During the 2019 legislative session, Busch introduced legislation to create oyster sanctuaries in the Chesapeake Bay. The bill passed and was vetoed by Governor Larry Hogan; the Maryland General Assembly voted to override Hogan's veto on April 8, the day after Busch's death.

=== Fiscal issues ===
During the 1995 legislative session, Busch introduced legislation to close a loophole that allowed title insurance agents who have taken clients' escrow money to continue working in the field. He also supported a bill to tighten state control of Maryland's title insurance industry by requiring lawyers selling title insurance to provide more information about their backgrounds to the state.

During the 2002 legislative session, Busch supported a bill that would prohibit insurance companies from raising policyholders' premiums or denying them coverage because they run into credit trouble.

In October 2003, Busch criticized Governor Bob Ehrlich for opposing tax increases to fund public schools, transportation, and maintain social services. During he 2004 legislative session, he introduced a bill that would raise $1 billion in new sales and income taxes, offset by a 60 percent reduction to the state's property taxes.

During the 2018 legislative session, Busch expressed support for allowing taxpayers to receive a state tax credit for donating to a new state-run charity that would benefit public schools, lowering the threshold on taxing the inheritance left by wealthy residents, and restoring personal exemptions on state tax returns.

During the 2019 legislative session, Busch supported legislation to raise Maryland's minimum wage to $15 an hour.

=== Gambling ===
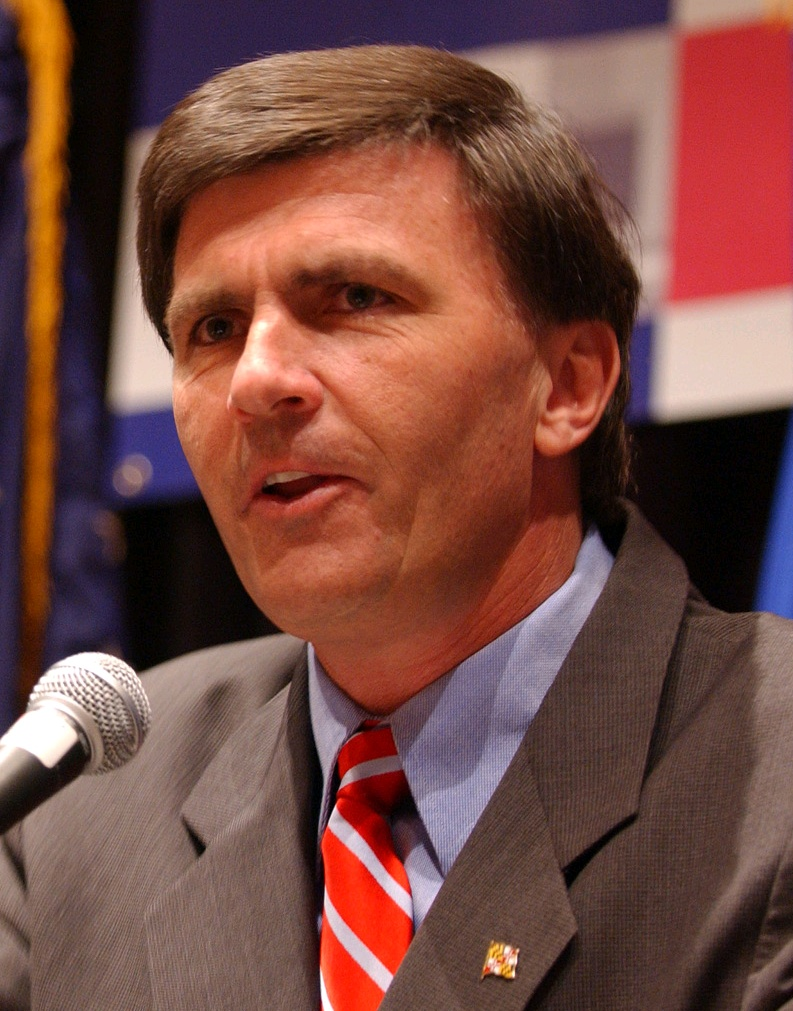
Busch was a leading opponent of Governor Bob Ehrlich's (pictured in 2004) efforts to bring casino gambling to Maryland.

In February 2001, Busch opposed a bill that would legalize slot machine gambling at racetracks and resorts, citing the state's budget surplus.

During the governorship of Bob Ehrlich, Busch orchestrated a campaign to defeat Ehrlich's push to bring casino gambling to Maryland, organizing a coalition of religious, labor, and African American leaders to launch phone banks and conduct polls to help identify and influence key swing groups of lawmakers. Using this information, he developed plans to capitalize on divisions within the various groups with a stake in slots and sidestepped pro-slots members of his own leadership team by avoiding strict stances that they could oppose. During the 2005 legislative session, Busch introduced his own bill to bring casino gambling to the state that differed significantly from the proposal being pushed by Ehrlich, which passed the House of Delegates by a 71–66 margin. The thin margin by which Busch's bill passed resulted in a deadlock that spelled defeat for casino gambling efforts under Ehrlich.

During the 2003 legislative session, Busch worked with House leadership to draft nearly a dozen tax bills to be considered along with Ehrlich's slots proposal. These tax bills included proposals to raise the sales tax from 5 percent to 6 percent, expanding the sales tax to include certain products and services, raising the fuel tax by 10 cents a gallon, closing various corporate loopholes, raising alcohol taxes, and collecting a temporary surcharge on the incomes of people earning more than $100,000 a year. Busch later backtracked on his proposals to raise taxes so that he could instead find a proper mix that a majority could support, and eventually introduced legislation that would study the slots issue for a year.

In May 2007, amid a looming $1.5 billion budget shortfall, Busch expressed openness to a modest slot machine gambling plan to patch the deficit, but suggested it could be a difficult sell at the same time legislators were proposing tax increases. In October 2007, Governor Martin O'Malley called a special session for the Maryland General Assembly to consider legislation to close the budget deficit through a series of tax increases paired with the legalization of slot machine gambling in Maryland via referendum. Busch continued to personally oppose slot machine gambling, but supported the referendum as a means to bring closure to the issue. The General Assembly approved O'Malley's slots proposal, which was approved by voters in the 2008 general election.

In April 2012, the Maryland General Assembly adjourned sine die without passing a revenue-raising operating budget, triggering an automatic "doomsday" budget. Busch blamed the collapse on the Maryland Senate, criticizing senators for focusing too much on legislation to expand gambling in the final days of the session. Senate president Thomas V. Miller Jr. rejected Busch's criticism in a letter to fellow senators that his support for the gambling bill had nothing to do with the budget impasse while characterizing actions of the House of Delegates on the final day of session as being "both immature and beneath the dignity of the General Assembly". Negotiations on the budget continued outside of session, and in May 2012, Governor O'Malley convened the General Assembly for a special session to pass the operating budget without expanding gambling. In July 2012, O'Malley called a second special session to pass legislation to expand gambling in Maryland by adding a sixth casino location that would operate in Prince George's County, subject to voters approving a statewide referendum. Maryland voters narrowly approved expanding gambling in the state in the November 2012 elections.

During the 2018 legislative session, Busch supported a bill creating a statewide referendum that would require revenues the state receives from gambling go to education, on top of funding already mandated by law, which was approved by voters in the 2018 general election. In May 2018, he supported proposals to legalize sports betting in Maryland.

=== Gun control ===
Busch supports licensing weapons, likening it to having a license to drive a car. During the 2013 legislative session, he was a lead supporter of the Firearm Safety Act, which placed restrictions magazine capacity in semi-automatic rifles and banned assault weapons in Maryland. The Firearm Safety Act passed and was signed into law by Governor Martin O'Malley. During the 2018 legislative session and following the 2017 Las Vegas shooting, Busch supported proposals to ban bump stocks in Maryland and implement the state's red flag law. During the 2019 legislative session, he supported legislation to ban homemade firearms.

=== Health care ===
During the 1995 legislative session, Busch supported a bill that would allow patients in health maintenance organizations (HMOs) to see physicians outside of their networks. He also introduced legislation that would require health insurers to pay for the first 48 hours of a hospital stay for a mother and her newborn baby, which passed and was signed into law by Governor Glendening.

In February 1997, Busch expressed concerns with bills mandating particular kinds of insurance coverage, saying that the mandates could drive up health care costs to the point where employers self-insure—and thereby become exempt from such mandates—or drop coverage entirely. In February 2001, Busch defended the state's mandates on health insurance companies, saying that most of the state's mandates were not high cost and did not have much of an effect on premium costs, and that health insurance companies would not provide the coverage if they were not forced to.

During the 1998 legislative session, Busch supported a bill that would allow consumers to appeal adverse decisions by HMOs and other health insurers, calling it the most important consumer protection legislation in the General Assembly that year.

During the 1999 legislative session, Busch supported legislation introduced by Governor Glendening that would establish a Patients' Bill of Rights. He opposed a provision in the bill that would guarantee the right to a hospital stay, saying that the legislature should not be deciding issues like hospital stays for specific surgeries.

During the 2001 legislative session, Busch introduced legislation that would allow senior citizens and poor people who do not qualify for Medicaid to receive prescription drug discounts of $20 for brand-name prescriptions and $10 for generic equivalents, paid for by drug manufacturers and pharmacies, and would reduce the hospital rate discount the state gives to health insurance firms in exchange for covering people who are otherwise uninsurable by $23 million. The bill passed and was signed into law by Glendening, and the plan was approved by the Bush administration in July 2002, allowing it to go into effect.

In January 2002, Busch opposed the proposed merger of CareFirst BlueCross BlueShield and WellPoint Health Networks, questioning how its sale to a company headquartered in California could be good for Maryland. During the 2002 legislative session, he introduced bills that would require CareFirst to prove its acquisition was in the best public interest before the merger could be approved and would tie CareFirst's exemption from the state insurance premium tax to significant changes in the way it does business, including the restructuring of its board and regulation of directors' pay by the state insurance commissioner. Busch's efforts helped derail the sale of CareFirst BlueCross BlueShield.

During the 2004 legislative session, Governor Ehrlich introduced legislation to reduce the state's non-economic damages cap and require economic damages to be paid out over a period of years instead of an upfront payment in an effort to curtail the state's medical malpractice crisis. The House rejected Ehrlich's bill, instead passing its own bill that would create a task force to study problems caused by increases in malpractice insurance premiums. In June 2004, Busch reportedly presented a plan to rein in increasing medical malpractice insurance costs to Governor Bob Ehrlich. The proposed plan would have created a special fund administered by the state's insurance commissioner that would be used to pay malpractice claims if rates hit a certain threshold. Ehrlich met with Busch and Miller to discuss a solution to the medical malpractice crisis in October 2004, after which Ehrlich presented a bill that combined proposals from his bill and the bill passed by the House of Delegates to legislators. In December 2004, the Maryland General Assembly convened for a special session on medical malpractice, which would have dedicated $30 million to a special fund to aid doctors and curbed payouts to plaintiffs in malpractice cases. Busch panned the proposal, pointing to several perceived shortcomings and telling reporters that he would be introducing alternative legislation during the special session. The Maryland General Assembly passed legislation to address the medical malpractice crisis by creating a fund funded by HMO taxes, which was vetoed by Governor Ehrlich, after which legislators voted to override the veto.

In January 2005, Busch called for the resignation of Maryland Insurance Commissioner Alfred W. Redmer Jr., claiming that he hastened rate increases by HMOs for political gain.

During the 2007 legislative session, Busch introduced the Children and Working Families Healthcare Act, which would provide $212 million to extend health coverage to at least 250,000 of Maryland's uninsured by raising the state's tobacco tax to $1 per pack. The proposal passed the House of Delegates, but died in the Senate after Miller balked at raising taxes to fund a new program until the state's deficit was resolved.

In October 2015, Busch supported legislation to allow terminally ill patients to use a prescription drug to end their lives.

Busch served as a member of the University of Maryland Medical System board from 2003 to 2019. During the 2019 legislative session, Busch introduced bills to impose stricter ethics requirements on the system, including a ban on sole-source procurement and prohibiting board members from intentionally using their position for private gain or the gain of another. The bill passed and was signed into law by Governor Hogan.

=== National politics ===
In 1998, Busch signed onto a letter to Howard County state's attorney Marna McLendon to investigate Linda Tripp for allegedly illegally wiretapping conversations between herself and Monica Lewinsky.

Busch was a member of the Governor's Redistricting Advisory Committee during the 2010 United States redistricting cycle, which voted to recommend a congressional map that redrew Maryland's 6th congressional district to improve the Democratic Party's chances of winning the district. In June 2017, during a lawsuit against the state's congressional map, Busch testified that they did not redraw Maryland's congressional districts with the intent of flipping Maryland's 6th congressional district, saying that he was largely unfamiliar with the data given to his staff during the redistricting process and that his support for the map was on the basis of "what I would believe was in the best interest of the citizens of the state".

In November 2016, Busch attributed Hillary Clinton's win in Anne Arundel County to voters being "turned off by the rhetoric and bigotry of Donald Trump". In January 2017, after Trump was inaugurated as president, Busch introduced resolutions calling on the attorney general of Maryland to "engage in offensive or defensive action to protect citizens of Maryland from harmful federal efforts" and to withdraw Maryland from previous agreements to call for a Constitutional Convention to rewrite the U.S. Constitution.

During the 2017 legislative session, Busch introduced a bill that would require Maryland to use an independent redistricting commission to redraw its congressional districts if New Jersey, New York, Pennsylvania, North Carolina, and Virginia all passed legislation to do so as well.

In January 2018, Busch wrote to Senate majority leader Mitch McConnell and House speaker Paul Ryan to express frustration with actions taken by Republicans, including the enactment of the Tax Cuts and Jobs Act, and to express concerns with the possibility of a government shutdown, citing the cost of a shutdown to Maryland's economy.

=== Social issues ===
Busch supports abortion rights. During the 1988 legislative session, he voted to ease restrictive language for Medicaid-funded abortions. In March 1998, Busch supported a bill that would require health insurers to cover contraception. In April 1999, Busch voted against a bill to ban partial-birth abortions. In August 2018, after President Donald Trump nominated Brett Kavanaugh to the U.S. Supreme Court, Busch said he planned to introduce legislation during the 2019 legislative session to codify abortion rights into the Constitution of Maryland; he withdrew the bill in February 2019, saying he was unable to get buy-in from Senate President Thomas V. Miller Jr. and planned to reintroduce the legislation during the 2020 legislative session.

During his first term, Busch supported efforts to expand Project Open Space (POS), including legislation to lift restrictions on the amount of tax money directed toward preserving open spaces.

In January 1996, Busch criticized proposed right-to-work laws in Maryland, saying that the state's stable labor force and seldom strikes were more important to industry leaders than right to work. During the 1999 legislative session, he supported a bill that would give state employees collective bargaining rights.

During the 1999 legislative session, Busch introduced a bill that would publicize information about pensions given to elected and appointed officials. The bill was introduced after a 1997 audit of the Retirement Plan for Appointed and Elected Officials found mistakes that cost county taxpayers at least $65,000. In committee, Busch agreed to have the bill amended to only affect elected officials in Anne Arundel County.

Busch signs the Civil Marriage Protection Act into law, 2012

During the 2006 legislative session, Republicans planned to push for a vote on a constitutional amendment to ban same-sex marriage in Maryland. In response, Busch passed a rule in the House that would make it harder for Republicans to do so, then began plotting a path that would allow moderate Democrats to voice their opposition to same-sex marriage without allowing the measure to pass and make it onto the 2006 general election ballot. Just before House minority leader Tony O'Donnell motioned to bring the measure to the floor, Busch motioned to adjourn the chamber, and that afternoon, the Judiciary Committee voted to kill the bill. Republicans revived the bill onto the floor the next morning, allowing social conservatives to vote their conscience, knowing that he had the votes to kill the measure. During his 2010 re-election campaign, Busch responded to a questionnaire from the Maryland Catholic Conference that he supported Maryland's current laws on marriage, which did not allow for same-sex marriages. He later told The Washington Post that he was uncomfortable using the term "marriage" to describe same-sex marriages, referring to them instead as "civil unions" because "marriage" brought to mind religious associations. His personal conversion on the issue came only after he was forced to focus on the issue during the 2011 legislative session, through a series of conversations in the weeks leading up to debate on the Civil Marriage Protection Act. That year, Busch held a floor debate on the bill, hoping it would change the minds of a couple of delegates who were opposed to same-sex marriage, but sent the bill back to committee after this ended up being unsuccessful. Afterwards, Busch pledged to reintroduce the Civil Marriage Protection Act during the 2012 legislative session, during which it passed the House of Delegates by a vote of 72–67. After voters approved Question 6 in the 2012 general election, Busch said that he would like Maryland's clerks to begin approving same-sex marriages on January 1, 2013.

During the 2007 legislative session, Busch supported a bill that would create a constitutional referendum to allow for early voting in Maryland.

In January 2014, Busch expressed openness to legislation that would impose only civil fines and drug treatment to people caught with small amounts of marijuana as an alternative to incarceration, but expressed concerns with allowing recreational marijuana use. In January 2019, he expressed openness to holding a statewide referendum on legalizing recreational marijuana, comparing it to overturning Prohibition.

In November 2016, Busch supported erecting statues of Harriet Tubman and Frederick Douglass at the Maryland State House. In August 2017, he called for the removal of the Roger B. Taney Monument from the grounds of the State House.

In November 2018, Busch criticized the University System of Maryland Board of Regents for voting to recommend that the University of Maryland, College Park retain football coach D. J. Durkin and athletic director Damon Evans following the death of Jordan McNair and allegations of a toxic culture in the Maryland football program, questioning how Durkin could be retained while College Park president Wallace Loh was essentially penalized for firing Durkin.

=== Transportation ===
During the 1990 legislative session, Busch supported a resolution expressing opposition to a proposed $1.5 billion Capital Beltway bypass that could cut through Anne Arundel County, expressing concerns that the bypass would bring unwanted traffic and development pressures to the Route 3 and Route 50 corridors. In 1991 and 1992, he introduced bills that would block construction of the bypass until the federal government completed a detailed study of its environmental effects and transportation alternatives.

During the 2013 legislative session, Busch supported a bill to phase-in increases to the state's fuel tax and transit fares to pay for state transportation projects. In February 2015, he criticized a bill backed by Governor Larry Hogan to block gas tax increases for six years, which he said would leave the state with "barely enough money for filling potholes". During the 2016 legislative session, Busch unveiled a transportation agenda that would require the Maryland Transportation Authority to replace the Governor Harry W. Nice Memorial Bridge and implement a new scoring system for determining which transportation projects deserve priority.

== Personal life ==
Busch, Ravens president Dick Cass, Governor Martin O'Malley, and wide receiver Torrey Smith with the Baltimore Ravens' Vince Lombardi Trophy following Super Bowl XLVII.

Busch married his wife, Cynthia Abbott, on December 22, 1994. Together, they had two children. In June 2013, Cynthia was cast as an extra for the Netflix series House of Cards, which was filmed at the Maryland State House. He is Catholic.

Busch was a fan of the Baltimore Ravens. He was longtime friends with Ravens owner Steve Bisciotti, who offered to fly him and other state lawmakers out to watch Super Bowl XXXV; Busch declined, wanting to avoid even the appearance of an ethical lapse.

Busch was inducted into the Anne Arundel County Sports Hall of Fame in 2003.

=== Health and death ===
In 1987, Busch was hospitalized after slipping in the snow and hitting his head during the inaugural parade for Governor William Donald Schaefer.

In October 2016, Busch was hospitalized after a complication from a prescription resulted in gastrointestinal bleeding, which caused him to miss a House Democratic Caucus meeting. He was later diagnosed with liver disease from nonalcoholic steatohepatitis; as his liver condition got progressively worse, Busch underwent a liver transplant in June 2017, to address issues with skin cancer medication. He returned to Annapolis office in August. As Busch's health declined, his supporters adopted the nickname "Iron Mike" to emphasize his strength and resilience as he tried to recover from the transplant. In September 2018, Busch underwent heart bypass surgery.

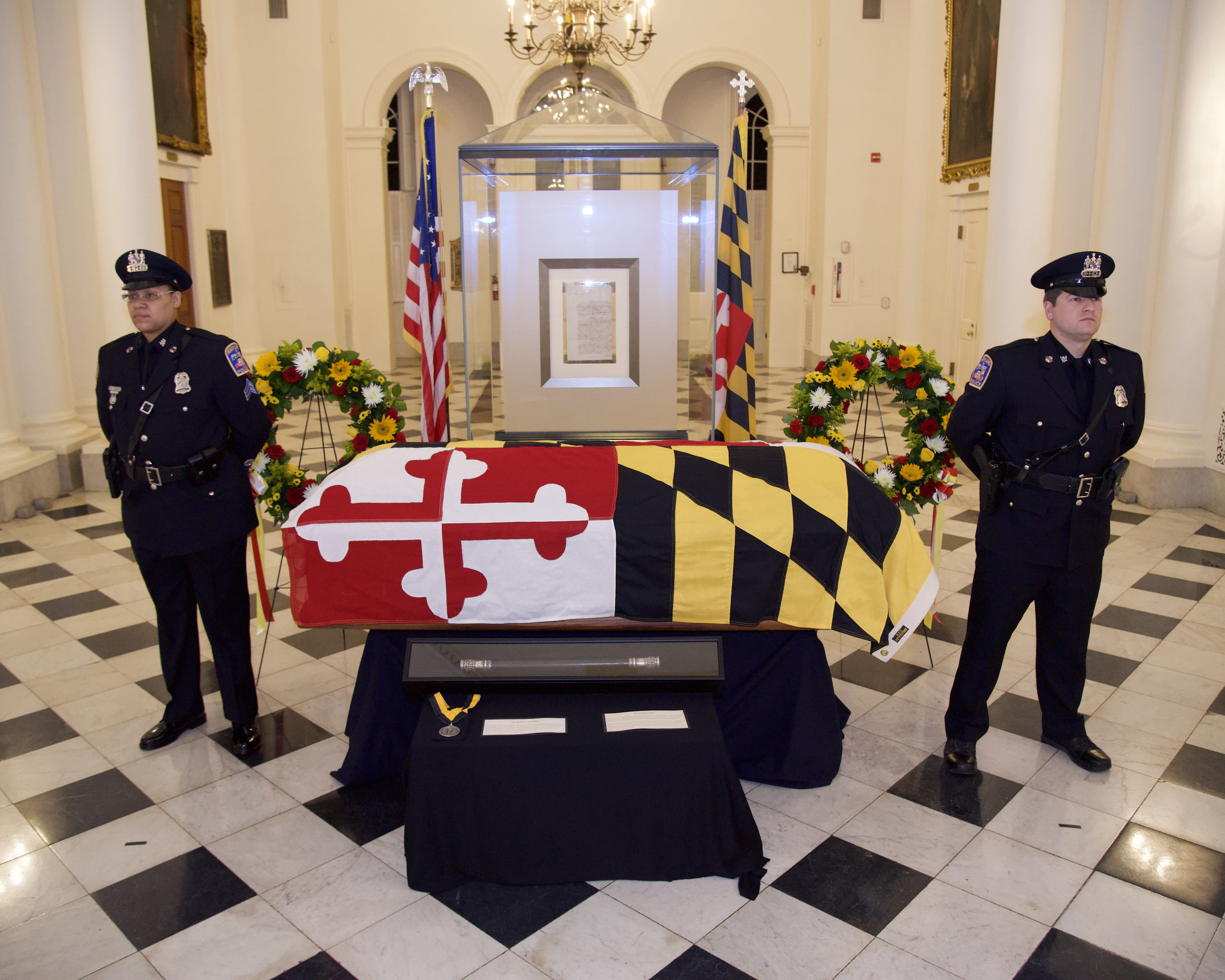
Michael Busch lies in state at the Maryland State Capitol.

Busch reportedly fell ill with pneumonia on March 26, 2019, after a follow-up procedure. He was hospitalized at the University of Maryland Medical Center, where he died from complications of pneumonia and non-alcoholic steatohepatitis on April 7. Maryland Governor Larry Hogan ordered flags to be flown at half-staff following his death. Busch was laid in state at the Maryland State House rotunda on April 15, 2019. His funeral took place on April 16 at St. John Neumann Church in Annapolis and was followed by a reception at the Navy-Marine Corps Memorial Stadium. He was laid to rest on April 16, 2019. Tributes from across the state flowed in following Busch's death.

== Legacy ==
On April 9, 2019, the Maryland General Assembly stopped its legislative work half an hour ahead of the usual midnight sine die adjournment to hold a special joint session in memory of Busch.

In July 2019, Anne Arundel County Executive Steuart Pittman dedicated a small stage constructed in Whitmore Park to Busch. In January 2020, Pittman directed that the newly built Annapolis branch of the Anne Arundel County Public Library be named the Michael E. Busch Annapolis Library in Busch's honor.

In September 2019, Maryland Hall, a cultural and arts center located in Annapolis renamed their building the Michael E. Busch Center for the Arts at Maryland Hall, in honor of Busch, who had fought for funding for the institution throughout his career.

In 2020, the District 30 Democratic Club, a social political club representing the same legislative district that Busch represented, was renamed the Michael E. Busch District 30 Democratic club in his honor.

In April 2022, Busch's official portrait was unveiled in the Maryland House of Delegates.

== Electoral history ==
1982 Maryland House of Delegates District 30 Democratic primary election
Party	Candidate	Votes	%
Democratic	John Astle (incumbent)	5,611	18.4
Democratic	Elmer F. Hagner (incumbent)	4,773	15.7
Democratic	Robert G. Kramer	4,144	13.6
Democratic	Ann Irvine	3,896	12.8
Democratic	Michael E. Busch	2,419	7.9
Democratic	John J. Wisniewski	2,345	7.7
Democratic	Carole R. Hardesty	2,105	6.9
Democratic	George Phelps Jr.	1,894	6.2
Democratic	Antonio J. Ristaino	1,123	3.7
Democratic	Samuel Gilmer	963	3.2
Democratic	James T. Chase	691	2.3
Democratic	Owen Taylor	514	1.7

1986 Maryland House of Delegates 30th district election
Primary election
Party	Candidate	Votes	%
Democratic	John Astle (incumbent)	7,729	26.7
Democratic	Michael E. Busch	4,628	16.0
Democratic	Donald E. Lamb	4,521	15.6
Democratic	Maryellen O. Brady	3,569	12.3
Democratic	George Phelps Jr.	3,422	11.8
Democratic	Casey Hughes	3,372	11.6
Democratic	George B. Woelfel Jr.	1,733	6.0
Total votes		28,974	100.0
General election
Democratic	John Astle (incumbent)	16,354	22.5
Democratic	Michael E. Busch	13,858	19.1
Democratic	Donald E. Lamb	12,898	17.8
Republican	John R. Hammond	12,895	17.8
Republican	David Kelley	10,291	14.2
Republican	Frank Bradlyn McClanahan	6,349	8.7
Total votes		72,645	100.0

1990 Maryland House of Delegates 30th district election
Primary election
Party	Candidate	Votes	%
Democratic	John Astle (incumbent)	6,993	24.2
Democratic	Michael E. Busch (incumbent)	5,775	20.0
Democratic	Edith Segree	4,256	14.8
Democratic	Patricia Clagett	4,160	14.4
Democratic	Barbara Neustadt	2,996	10.4
Democratic	Michael T. Brown	1,882	6.5
Democratic	Frances L. Parker	1,432	5.0
Democratic	M. Gerald Ackerman	1,359	4.7
Total votes		28,853	100.0
General election
Democratic	John Astle (incumbent)	18,009	22.9
Republican	Aris T. Allen	16,951	21.5
Democratic	Michael E. Busch (incumbent)	16,104	20.5
Democratic	Edith Segree	14,341	18.2
Republican	Phillip D. Bissett	13,321	16.9
Total votes		78,726	100.0

1994 Maryland House of Delegates 30th district election
Primary election
Party	Candidate	Votes	%
Democratic	Virginia P. Clagett	7,575	29.0
Democratic	Michael E. Busch (incumbent)	6,828	26.1
Democratic	John C. Eldridge Jr.	3,771	14.4
Democratic	Stephen Carr	3,526	13.5
Democratic	Larry M. Johnson	2,918	11.2
Democratic	Charles M. Ross	1,534	5.9
Total votes		26,152	100.0
General election
Democratic	Michael E. Busch (incumbent)	18,709	18.5
Republican	Phillip Bissett (incumbent)	18,330	18.2
Democratic	Virginia P. Clagett	18,254	18.1
Republican	Ralph C. Rocky Rosacker	16,299	16.2
Republican	Joan Beck	15,974	15.8
Democratic	John C. Eldridge Jr.	13,320	13.2
Total votes		100,886	100.0

1998 Maryland House of Delegates 30th district election
Primary election
Party	Candidate	Votes	%
Democratic	Virginia P. Clagett (incumbent)	7,701	31.6
Democratic	Michael E. Busch (incumbent)	7,195	29.5
Democratic	C. Richard D'Amato	6,237	25.6
Democratic	Rocky Rosacker	3,272	13.4
Total votes		24,405	100.0
General election
Democratic	Michael E. Busch (incumbent)	24,075	21.2
Democratic	Virginia P. Clagett (incumbent)	24,036	21.2
Democratic	C. Richard D'Amato	20,223	17.8
Republican	Phillip Bissett (incumbent)	18,690	16.5
Republican	Edward J. Turner	14,119	12.4
Republican	Tony McConkey	12,353	10.9
Total votes		113,496	100.0

2002 Maryland House of Delegates 30th district election
Primary election
Party	Candidate	Votes	%
Democratic	Virginia P. Clagett (incumbent)	8,073	32.2
Democratic	Michael E. Busch (incumbent)	7,482	29.8
Democratic	C. Richard D'Amato (incumbent)	7,117	28.4
Democratic	Shirley May Little	2,415	9.6
Total votes		25,087	100.0
General election
Democratic	Michael E. Busch (incumbent)	22,422	17.7
Democratic	Virginia P. Clagett (incumbent)	21,875	17.3
Republican	Herbert H. McMillan	20,972	16.6
Democratic	C. Richard D'Amato (incumbent)	20,545	16.3
Republican	Michael Collins	19,140	15.1
Republican	Nancy Almgren	18,861	14.9
Green	David M. Gross	2,536	2.0
Write-in		71	0.1
Total votes		126,422	100.0

2006 Maryland House of Delegates 30th district election
Primary election
Party	Candidate	Votes	%
Democratic	Michael E. Busch (incumbent)	9,419	29.2
Democratic	Virginia P. Clagett (incumbent)	9,022	28.0
Democratic	Barbara Samorajczyk	7,139	22.2
Democratic	Konrad M. Wayson	4,161	12.9
Democratic	Shirley May Little	2,484	7.7
Total votes		32,225	100.0
General election
Democratic	Michael E. Busch (incumbent)	22,479	17.1
Democratic	Virginia P. Clagett (incumbent)	22,360	17.0
Republican	Ron George	21,811	16.6
Democratic	Barbara Samorajczyk	21,758	16.5
Republican	Andy Smarick	20,594	15.6
Republican	Ron Elfenbein	20,457	15.5
Constitution	David Whitney	2,225	1.7
Write-in		80	0.1
Total votes		131,764	100.0

2010 Maryland House of Delegates 30th district election
Primary election
Party	Candidate	Votes	%
Democratic	Michael E. Busch (incumbent)	7,495	31.9
Democratic	Virginia P. Clagett (incumbent)	7,429	31.6
Democratic	Judd Legum	5,798	24.7
Democratic	Shirley May Little	2,779	11.8
Total votes		23,501	100.0
General election
Republican	Ron George (incumbent)	25,631	19.2
Democratic	Michael E. Busch (incumbent)	23,995	18.0
Republican	Herb McMillan	22,553	16.9
Democratic	Virginia P. Clagett (incumbent)	21,142	15.9
Republican	Seth A. Howard	20,080	15.1
Democratic	Judd Legum	19,670	14.8
Write-in		89	0.1
Total votes		133,160	100.0

2014 Maryland House of Delegates District 30A election
Primary election
Party	Candidate	Votes	%
Democratic	Michael E. Busch (incumbent)	5,255	39.0
Democratic	Chuck Ferrar	2,854	21.2
Democratic	Maria Triandos	1,864	13.8
Democratic	Cheryl Miller	1,779	13.2
Democratic	Laurie Sears Deppa	794	5.9
Democratic	Ridg Mills	690	5.1
Democratic	Gordon Smith	227	1.7
Total votes		13,463	100.0
General election
Republican	Herb McMillan (incumbent)	14,484	27.9%
Democratic	Michael E. Busch (incumbent)	14,289	27.6
Democratic	Chuck Ferrar	11,932	23.0
Republican	Genevieve Lindner	11,100	21.4
Write-in		56	0.1
Total votes		51,861	100.0

2018 Maryland House of Delegates District 30A election
Primary election
Party	Candidate	Votes	%
Democratic	Michael E. Busch (incumbent)	5,832	40.2
Democratic	Alice J. Cain	4,053	28.0
Democratic	Aron Axe	2,773	19.1
Democratic	Mary Reese	1,841	12.7
Total votes		14,499	100.0
General election
Democratic	Michael E. Busch (incumbent)	20,080	32.6
Democratic	Alice Cain	18,070	29.3
Republican	Chelsea Gill	12,097	19.6
Republican	Bob O'Shea	11,324	18.4
Write-in		53	0.1
Total votes		61,624	100.0

Political offices
Preceded by Casper Taylor	Speaker of the Maryland House of Delegates; 2003–2019	Succeeded by Adrienne A. Jones
