= Herbert H. McMillan =

American politician

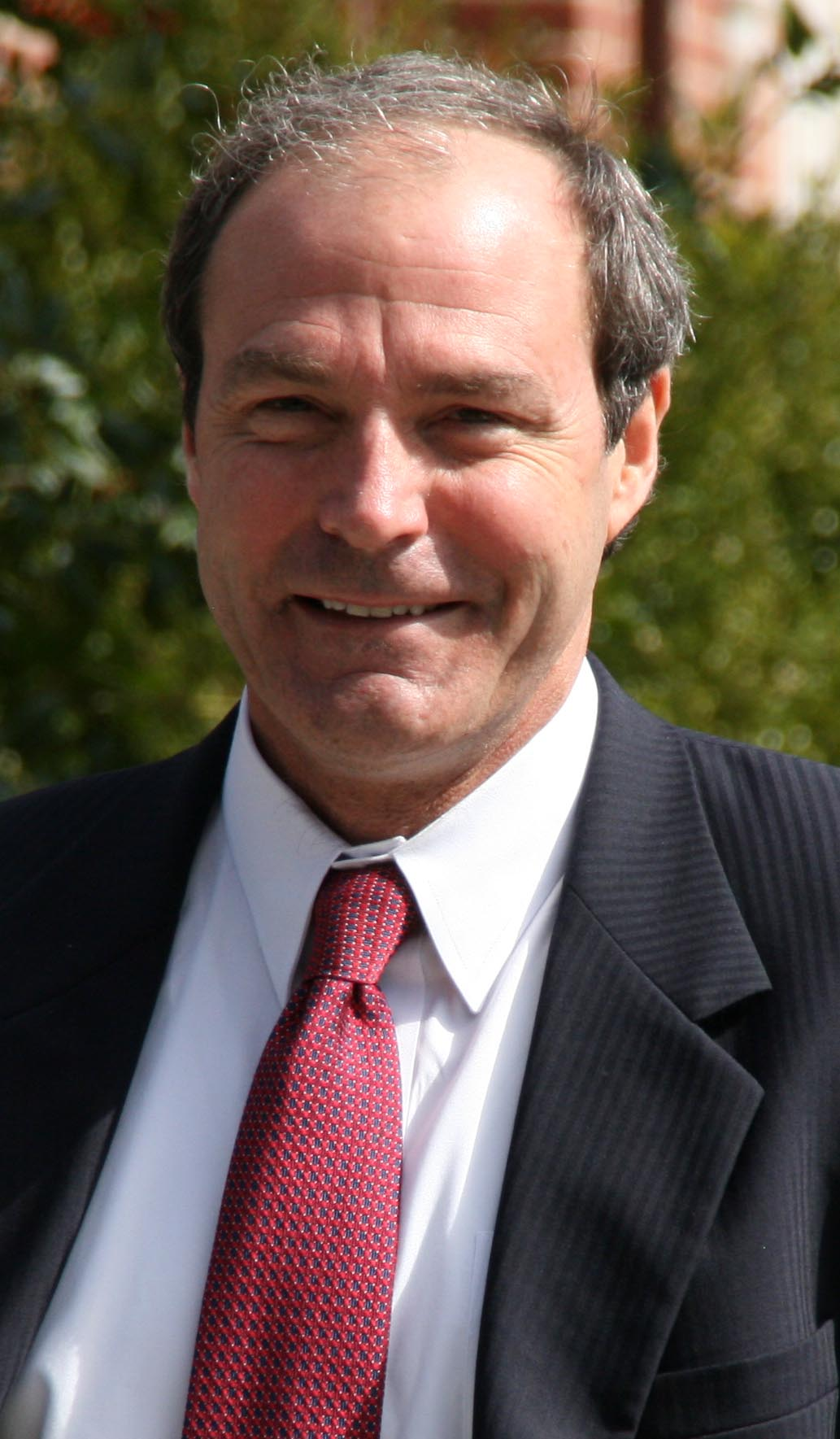

Member of the Maryland House of Delegates from the 30th district
- In office January 12, 2011 – January 9, 2019
- Preceded by: Virginia P. Clagett
- Succeeded by: Alice J. Cain
- In office January 8, 2003 – January 10, 2007
- Preceded by: C. Richard D'Amato
- Succeeded by: Ron George

Personal details
- Born: May 30, 1958 (age 68) Knoxville, Tennessee
- Party: Republican
- Profession: Pilot

Herbert H. McMillan (born May 30, 1958) is a Republican former member of the Maryland House of Delegates, representing District 30 in Anne Arundel County, MD from 2003 to 2007 and from 2011 to 2019. He served alongside Democrat Michael E. Busch and Republican Ron George. In 2006 he challenged District 30 Senator John Astle, a Democrat, who defeated him 53 percent to 47 percent. In 2022, McMillan unsuccessfully ran for the Republican nomination for Anne Arundel County executive.

== Education ==
McMillan graduated from the United States Naval Academy in 1980 with a Bachelor of Science degree in history and later completed graduate studies in public administration at Central Michigan University in 1990.

== Career ==
McMillan served in U.S. Navy from 1980 until 1991. He received a Navy commendation medal in 1988. He has served in the U.S. Naval Reserve since leaving active duty with the Navy. McMillan has also been a pilot for American Airlines since 1991.

McMillan first started his public service by being elected as an Annapolis Alderman representing 5th Ward. He served from 1997 to 2001. In 2001 he ran for Mayor of Annapolis and was soundly defeated. The next year he ran for a seat in the Maryland House of Delegates. During his term on the city council, he was on the Economic Matters and Housing and Human Welfare Committees. He also chaired the Rules Committee during his tenure.

While in his first term in the House of Delegates, McMillan served on the Judiciary Committee. Following his first term in the House, McMillan ran for the State Senate and was defeated by incumbent John Astle. Four years later he was reelected to the House. In his second term he served on the Environmental Matters Committee, and then the Health and Government Operation Committee in 2015. McMillan was also appointed as the Chief Deputy Minority Whip, a position he held till his retirement form the House of Delegates. He was also a member of the Anne Arundel County Delegation, where he was the chair of the Capital Projects/Bond Bill Subcommittee, from 2011-2018. Finally, he was a member and founder and chair of the Maryland Taxpayers Protection Caucus, the Maryland Bicycle and Pedestrian Caucus, the Maryland Legislative Sportsmen's Caucus, and the Maryland Veterans Caucus.

Outside of his legislative work, he was president of the West Annapolis Parent-Teacher Association from 1990–91, the vice-president of the Hunt Meadow Homeowners Association from 1991 until 1996, and a board member of the Anne Arundel County Economic Opportunity Committee from 1998 until 2002.

He is also a member of the U.S. Naval Academy Alumni Association, the Fleet Reserve Association, the Knights of Columbus, the St. Mary's Royal Blue and the Annapolis Touchdown Club. He received the Taxpayers Advocate Award from the Maryland Taxpayers Association in 2002.

In 2022, McMillan sought the Republican nomination for Anne Arundel County executive, finishing second to County Council member Jessica Haire in a five-person race.

== Election results ==
- 2014 Race for Maryland House of Delegates – District 30A

Voters to choose two:

Name	Votes	Percent	Outcome
Herb McMillan, Rep.	14,484	27.9%	Won
Michael E. Busch, Dem.	14,289	27.6%	Won
Chuck Ferrar, Dem.	11,932	23.0%	Lost
Genevieve Lindner, Rep.	11,100	21.4%	Lost
Other Write-Ins	56	0.01%	Lost

- 2010 Race for Maryland House of Delegates – District 30

Voters to choose three:

Name	Votes	Percent	Outcome
Ronald A. George, Rep.	25,631	19.25%	Won
Michael E. Busch, Dem.	23,995	18.02%	Won
Herb McMillan, Rep.	22,553	16.94%	Won
Virginia P. Clagett, Dem.	21,142	15.88%	Lost
Seth Howard, Rep.	20,080	15.08%	Lost
Judd Legum, Dem.	19,670	14.77%	Lost
Other Write-Ins	89	0.07%	

- 2006 Race for Maryland Senate – District 30

Voters to choose one:

Table TBD

- 2002 Race for Maryland House of Delegates – District 30

Voters to choose three:

Name	Votes	Percent	Outcome
Michael E. Busch, Dem.	22,422	17.7%	Won
Virginia P. Clagett, Dem.	21,875	17.3%	Won
Herbert McMillan, Rep.	20,972	16.6%	Won
C. Richard D'Amato, Dem.	20,545	16.3%	Lost
Michael Collins, Rep.	19,140	15.1%	Lost
Nancy Almgren, Rep.	18,861	14.9%	Lost
David M. Gross, Green	2,536	2.0%	Lost
Other Write-Ins	71	0.1%	
