= Phillip D. Bissett =

American politician

Member of the Maryland House of Delegates from the 30th district
- In office March 1991 – January 13, 1999
- Preceded by: Aris T. Allen
- Succeeded by: C. Richard D'Amato

Director of MARC Train System
- In office 2004 – May 17, 2005

Personal details
- Born: September 11, 1956 (age 69) Bethesda, Maryland
- Party: Republican

Phillip D. Bissett (born September 11, 1956) is an American politician who was a member of the Maryland House of Delegates representing District 30 in Anne Arundel County from 1991 to 1999. In 2002, he unsuccessfully ran for Anne Arundel County Executive, losing to incumbent Janet S. Owens in the general election.

== Background ==
Bissett was appointed to replace the late Aris T. Allen in the Maryland House of Delegates in 1991. He served until 1999 when he was defeated by C. Richard D'Amato for his seat in Anne Arundel County's District 30.

== Education ==
Bissett attended Southern High School. After high school he attended Anne Arundel Community College.

== Career ==
Bissett has been active in the Republican Party for many years. Prior to serving as State Delegate in the Maryland House of Delegates, he was a member of the County Executive's Transition Team for Anne Arundel County in 1990. He has also served on the State Commission on the Capital City and the South County Environmental Commission.

While a member of the House of Delegates, Bissett served on several committees including: the Judiciary Committee from 1991 until 1999 and the Joint Committee on Federal Relations from 1994 until 1999. He was the Chair of the Anne Arundel County Delegation from 1995 until 1999 and a member of the Southern Legislative Conference. Finally, he was the Maryland Vice-Chair of the American Legislative Exchange Council (ALEC) from 1997 until 1999.

Since leaving his elected position, he has served as Director of the Maryland Area Regional Commuter (MARC) Train and Commuter Bus Service from 2004 until May 17, 2005. He was a Delegate to the Republican Party National Convention, 1992 and 1996. He was co-chair of the Anne Arundel County Bush/Quayle Campaign in 1992. He is a former member of the Anne Arundel County Republican Central Committee and a current member of the Loch Haven Civic Association. He is a past member of the Young Republicans of Anne Arundel County.

Bissett was the Republican nominee for County Executive in 2002, losing a close race to Janet S. Owens despite being outspent 6-to-1. Bissett served as Director of Maryland's MARC Train System under Governor Bob Ehrlich until May 17, 2005, when he stepped down. Bissett campaigned for a second try to be County Executive in 2006, again losing a close race to John Leopold by 1.65% of the vote.

Bissett has won several awards in his career including Legislator of the Year from the State's Attorneys' Association in 1994 and the Legislator of the Year from the Judiciary Committee of the Maryland Chamber of Commerce in 1997.

== Election results ==
- 2002 election for Anne Arundel County Executive

Voters to choose one:

Name	Votes	Percent	Outcome
Janet S. Owens, Dem.	89,456	51.8%	Won
Phillip Bissett, Rep.	83,305	48.2%	Lost

- 1998 election for Maryland House of Delegates – District 30

Voters to choose three:

Name	Votes	Percent	Outcome
Michael E. Busch, Dem.	24,075	21%	Won
Virginia P. Clagett, Dem.	24,036	21%	Won
C. Richard D'Amato, Dem.	20,223	18%	Won
Phillip Bissett, Rep.	18,690	16%	Lost
Edward J. Turner, Rep.	14,119	12%	Lost
Anthony McConkey, Rep.	12,353	11%	Lost

- 1994 election for Maryland House of Delegates – District 30

Voters to choose three:

Name	Votes	Percent	Outcome
Michael E. Busch, Dem.	18,709	19%	Won
Phillip Bissett, Rep.	18,009	23%	Won
Virginia P. Clagett, Dem.	18,254	18%	Won
Ralph C. Rosacker, Rep.	16,299	16%	Lost
Joan Beck, Rep.	15,974	16%	Lost
John C. Eldridge Jr., Dem.	13,320	13%	Lost

- 1990 election for Maryland House of Delegates – District 30

Voters to choose three:

Name	Votes	Percent	Outcome
John C. Astle, Dem.	18,009	23%	Won
Aris Allen, Rep.	16,951	22%	Won
Michael E. Busch, Dem.	16,104	18%	Won
Edith Segree, Dem.	14,341	18%	Lost
Phillip Bissett, Rep.	13,321	17%	Lost
