= Holly Hill (Friendship, Maryland) =

Historic house in Maryland, United States

- U.S. National Register of Historic Places
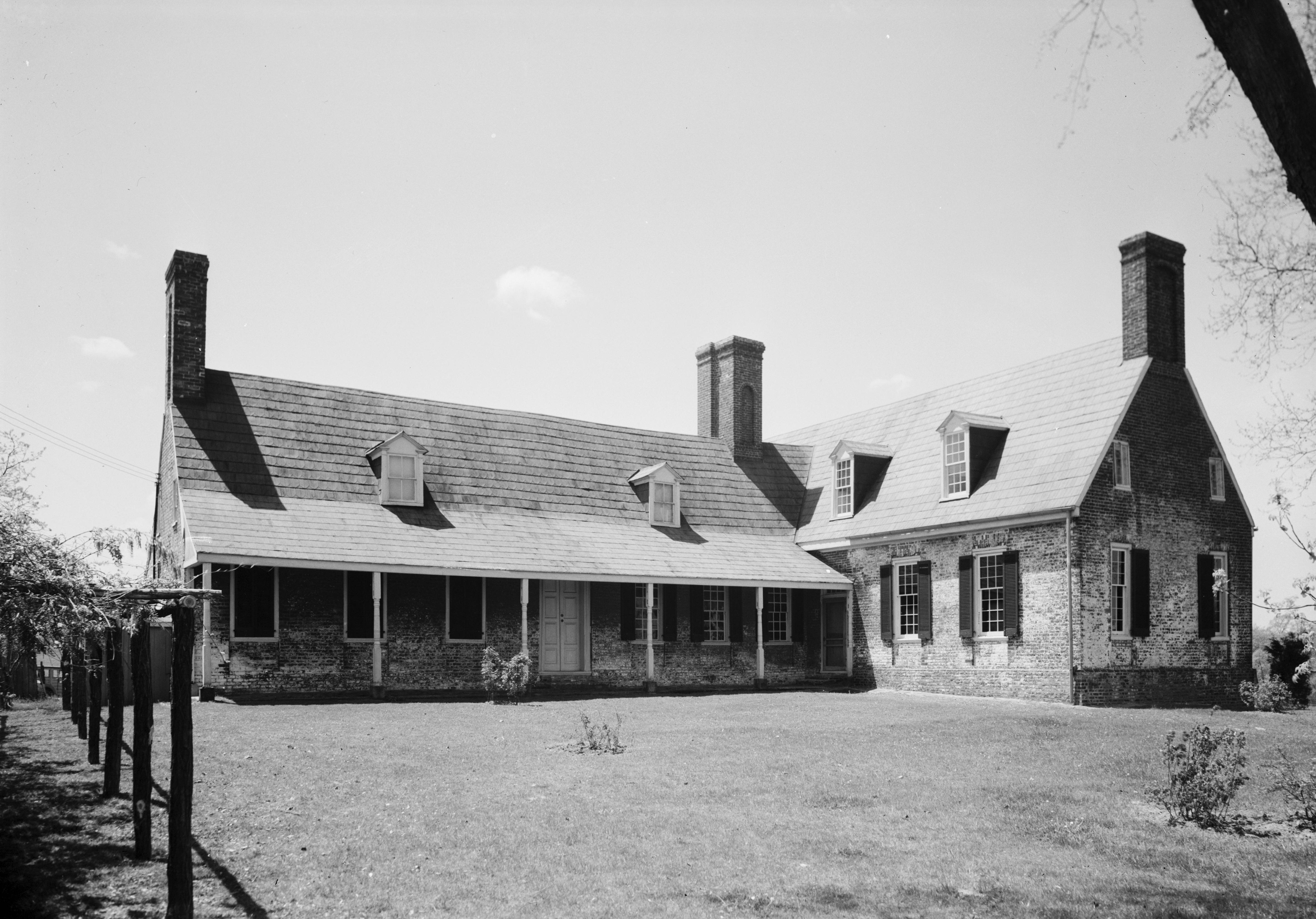
- Holly Hill in 1937

- Location within Maryland Location within the United States
- Location: Friendship Road (MD 621), Friendship, Maryland
- Coordinates: 38°43′30″N 76°33′58″W
- Built: c. 1698
- Architect: Richard Harrison (c. 1698); Samuel Harrison (1713; c. 1730)
- Architectural style: Medieval Transitional; Tidewater
- NRHP reference No.: 71000367
- Added to NRHP: October 26, 1971

Holly Hill, also known as Holland's Hills or Rose Valley, is a historic house at Friendship, Anne Arundel County, Maryland, United States. It was initially named as Holland's Hills for Francis Holland, who bought the land in 1665. Richard Harrison, a Quaker planter and shipowner, bought the land and built a home on it. Harrison owned about 6,000 acres total.

It was originally a primitive, two-room, 1 1/2-story frame dwelling constructed in the fall or winter of 1698. An addition was made in 1713, and c. 1730, the entire structure was encased in brick and another addition was constructed. The house is an example of Medieval Transitional architecture built in Maryland during the mid-seventeenth century. It was a quarter plantation of Richard Harrison, who likely built the original structure for his son, Samuel Harrison (1679–1733).

The inventory of Samuel Harrison's estate (1733) lists thirteen rooms, including a kitchen as well as a library of 195 books. Harrison's "store" or storeroom contained abundant supplies of everything from cooper's tools to tobacco boxes to India silk. Interesting features of the house include original brick vaulting in the cellar, fine paneling and moldings, ancient glass panes, batten doors with original hardware, a wall of rare marbleized paneling; and three eighteenth-century paintings on wood. In 1825, the will of Benjamin Harrison bequeathed half of the household furniture and three African-American slaves to his daughter Ann Tongue.

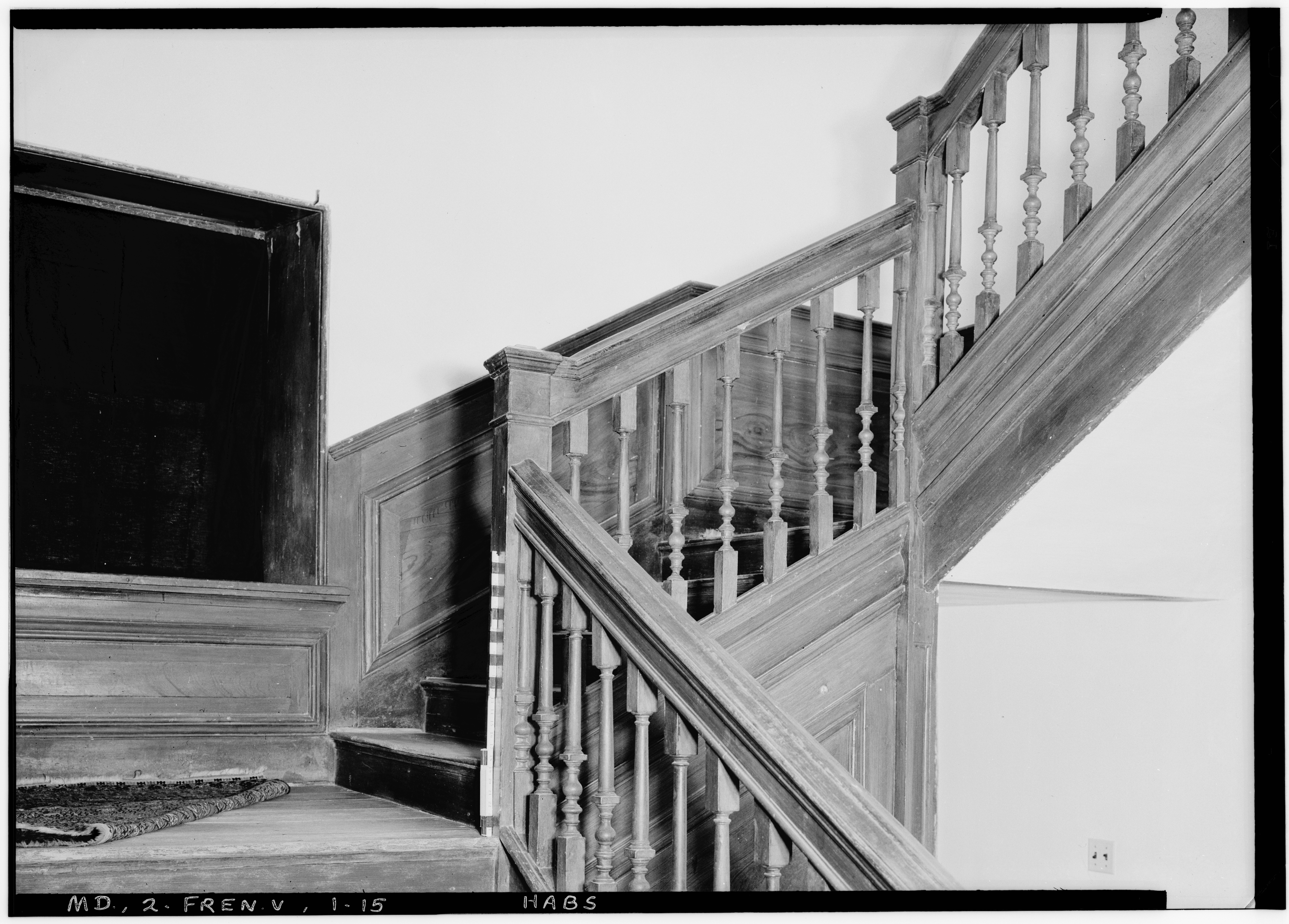
Detail of stair. Holly Hill. Historic American Buildings Survey. By John O. Brostrup

Ownership of Holly Hill continued in the Harrison family until 1850; then, after a brief period, it was owned by the Scrivener family until Captain and Mrs. Hugh P. LeClair purchased it in the late 1930s. The LeClair family completed an extensive restoration of the house and added a kitchen wing and a detached garage in faithful Tidewater style.

In 1968, Holly Hill was purchased by attorney Brice McAdoo Clagett (1933–2008) and his wife Virginia Parker Clagett. Brice was a descendant of the original builder, Richard Harrison. Clagett and his wife added extensive ornamental plantings and gardens to the grounds near the house.

Holly Hill was listed on the National Register of Historic Places in 1971. Holly Hill is protected by conservation easements that are held by Maryland Environmental Trust and Maryland Historical Trust. It comprises 585.6 acres (237.0 ha).

== See also ==
- Tulip Hill
- List of the oldest buildings in Maryland
