= Aris T. Allen =

American politician (1910–1991)

Member of the Maryland Senate from the 30th district
- In office 1979–1982
- Preceded by: Edward T. Hall
- Succeeded by: David M. King

Member of the Maryland House of Delegates from the 30th district
- In office January 9, 1991 – February 8, 1991
- Preceded by: Donald E. Lamb
- Succeeded by: Phillip D. Bissett

Member of the Maryland House of Delegates from the 6B district
- In office 1967–1974

Personal details
- Born: December 27, 1910 San Antonio, Texas, U.S.
- Died: February 8, 1991 (aged 80) Annapolis, Maryland, U.S.
- Party: Republican
- Spouse(s): Faye Watson Allen, M.D.
- Children: 2
- Occupation: Physician

Aris T. Allen (December 27, 1910 – February 8, 1991) was an American politician who was the first African-American chair of the Maryland Republican Party and the first to run for a statewide office in Maryland.

== Background ==
Aris Allen was born in San Antonio, Texas, on December 27, 1910. He attended public schools in San Antonio and Washington, D.C., and graduated from Dunbar High School in Washington. He attended Howard University and Howard University Medical School, earning an M.D. in 1944.

Allen was president of his class at Howard University in Washington, D.C. Allen married Faye E. Watson in 1947; the couple had two children.

Allen served as a pilot in a United States Army Specialized Training Program in 1942, and was an Air Force flight surgeon from 1953 to 1955.

=== Medicine ===
Allen started his medical career as a medical resident at Freedman's Hospital, Washington, D.C., in 1944 and 1945, then went into private practice in Annapolis. He received the Maryland Medical Association award for outstanding achievements in medicine and civic affairs in 1967. He was also the medical affairs advisor to the Health Care Financing Administration in Maryland from 1981 to 1989, a member of the Board of Medical Examiners of Maryland, and director of the Health Standards and Quality Board of the Health Care Financing Administration. He was a board member of the Maryland Academy of Family Physicians and president of the medical staff of Anne Arundel Medical Center.

=== Education ===
Allen devoted much of his time to the education of youth in Maryland. He was the first African American to be appointed to the Anne Arundel County Board of Education, was a member of the board of the Anne Arundel Community College, a Trustee of the Anne Arundel County Public Library, and was vice chair for the board of regents at Morgan State University.

=== Civic involvement ===
Allen served on the boards of the YMCA, the Salvation Army, the Community Chest of Anne Arundel County, the Red Cross, the Annapolis Chamber of Commerce and the Annapolis chapter of the American Cancer Society; he was a life member of the NAACP, a member of Alpha Phi Alpha fraternity (Eta Eta Lambda chapter), and a member of the Board of stewards for his church, Mount Moriah A. M. E.

== In the legislature ==
Allen first served in the House of Delegates representing Anne Arundel County from 1967 to 1974 and then from 1990 to 1991. During his tenure in the House he was Minority whip from 1967 to 1974 and a member of the Constitutional and Administrative Law Committee, 1967–74. In the Maryland Senate he served on the Finance Committee from 1979 to 1981.

- 1990 Race for Maryland House of Delegates – District 30

Voters to choose three:

Name	Votes	Percent	Outcome
John Astle, Dem.	18,009	23%	Won
Aris T. Allen, Rep.	16,951	22%	Won
Michael E. Busch, Dem.	16,104	18%	Won
Edith Segree, Dem.	14,341	18%	Lost
Phillip D. Bissett, Rep.	13,321	17%	Lost

== Republican activist ==
Chair, Maryland state Republican Party. Chair of the Maryland delegates to the Republican National Convention, 1972. NAACP county conference award, 1976. Chair, Republican State Central Committee, 1977–79. Rotary International Paul Harris Fellowship, 1978. Candidate for lieutenant governor of Maryland, 1978. Convention secretary, Republican National Convention, 1980.

Gubernatorial General Election Results, 1978

Candidates	Votes	Percent	Outcome
Harry R. Hughes/Samuel W. Bogley Dem.	718,328	70.98%	Won
John Glenn Beall Jr./Aris T. Allen Rep.	293,635	29.02%	Lost

== Legacy ==
Dr. Allen died of a self-inflicted gunshot wound in Annapolis on February 8, 1991, after being diagnosed with pancreatic cancer.

A freeway, Aris T. Allen Boulevard (Maryland Route 665), is named for Allen, who died the year prior to its completion.

The text of the memorial reads:

A man of honor...A distinguished career of professional and public service...As a Medical Doctor...As a member of the Maryland State Legislature...As an appointee of The President of the United States, to serve his Country on the National level...And as a caring person who has served his community in so many other ways...To help people in need...To provide opportunity for every citizen...And to set an example that brings out the very best in us.
