= Virginia P. Clagett =

American politician (born 1943)

Virginia Parker Clagett
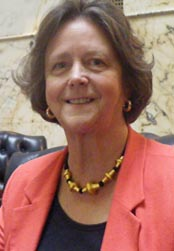

Member of the Maryland House of Delegates from the 30th district
- In office January 11, 1995 – January 12, 2011
- Preceded by: John Astle
- Succeeded by: Herbert H. McMillan
- Constituency: Anne Arundel County

Personal details
- Born: Virginia Lawrence Parker; July 18, 1943 (age 83) Washington, DC
- Party: Democratic
- Spouse: Brice McAdoo Clagett (divorced)

Virginia Lawrence (Parker) Clagett (born 18 Jul 1943) is an American politician from Maryland and a member of the Democratic Party. She served in the Maryland House of Delegates, representing Maryland's District 30 in Anne Arundel County, until her 4th term ended in December 2010. A proven vote-getter for decades, she lost re-election in November 2010 to Delegate Herbert H. McMillan.

== Personal life ==
Virginia Lawrence Parker graduated from Potomac School, Madeira School, and Smith College. Clagett married attorney Brice McAdoo Clagett on September 18, 1968. In 1968, they bought Holly Hill, a house in Friendship, Maryland that was built by Brice Clagett's ancestors more than three centuries prior. They had two children: John Brice de Treville Clagett and Ann Calvert Brooke Clagett. They later divorced.

== Career ==
=== Legislative Notes ===
- voted in favor of the Tax Reform Act of 2007 (HB2)
- voted in favor of in-state tuition for students who attended Maryland high schools for at least 2 years. (2007) (HB6)
- voted for the Maryland Gang Prosecution Act of 2007 (HB713), subjecting gang members to up to 20 years in prison and/or a fine of up to $100,000
- voted for Jessica's Law (HB 930), eliminating parole for the most violent child sexual predators and creating a mandatory minimum sentence of 25 years in state prison, 2007
- voted for Public Safety – Statewide DNA Database System – Crimes of Violence and Burglary – Post conviction (HB 370), helping to give police officers and prosecutors greater resources to solve crimes and eliminating a backlog of 24,000 unanalyzed DNA samples, leading to 192 arrests, 2008
- voted for Vehicle Laws – Repeated Drunk and Drugged Driving Offenses – Suspension of License (HB 293), strengthening Maryland's drunk driving laws by imposing a mandatory one year license suspension for a person convicted of drunk driving more than once in five years, 2009
- voted for HB 102, creating the House Emergency Medical Services System Workgroup, leading to Maryland's budgeting of $52 million to fund three new Medevac helicopters to replace the State's aging fleet, 2009

For the past four years, Delegate Claggett has annually voted to support classroom teachers, public schools, police and hospitals in Anne Arundel County. Since 2002, funding to schools across the State has increased 82%, resulting in Maryland being ranked top in the nation for K-12 education.

In 2010 Del. Clagett had one of the highest lodging records in the state (almost $11,000) despite the fact that Annapolis is in her District.

== Election results ==
- 2010 Race for Maryland House of Delegates – 30th District

Voters to choose three:

Name	Votes	Percent	Outcome
Ronald A. George, Rep.	25,631	19.25%	Won
Michael E. Busch, Dem.	23,995	18.02%	Won
Herb McMillan, Rep.	22,553	16.94%	Won
Virginia P. Clagett, Dem.	21,142	15.88%	Lost
Seth Howard, Rep.	20,080	15.08%	Lost
Judd Legum, Dem.	19,670	14.77%	Lost
Other Write-Ins	89	0.07%	

- 2006 Race for Maryland House of Delegates – 30th District

Voters to choose three:

Name	Votes	Percent	Outcome
Michael E. Busch, Dem.	22,479	17.1%	Won
Virginia P. Clagett, Dem.	22,360	17.0%	Won
Ronald A. George, Rep.	21,811	16.6%	Won
Barbara Samorajczyk, Dem.	21,758	16.5%	Lost
Andy Smarick, Rep.	20,594	15.6%	Lost
Ron Elfenbein, Rep.	20,457	15.5%	Lost
David Whitney, Con.	2,225	1.7%	Lost
Other Write-Ins	80	0.1%	

- 2002 Race for Maryland House of Delegates – 30th District

Voters to choose three:

Name	Votes	Percent	Outcome
Michael E. Busch, Dem.	22,422	17.7%	Won
Virginia P. Clagett, Dem.	21,875	17.3%	Won
Herbert H. McMillan, Rep.	20,972	16.6%	Won
C. Richard D'Amato, Dem.	20,545	16.3%	Lost
Michael Collins, Rep.	19,140	15.1%	Lost
Nancy Almgren, Rep.	18,861	14.9%	Lost
David M. Gross, Green	2,536	2.0%	Lost
Other Write-Ins	71	0.1%	

- 1998 Race for Maryland House of Delegates – District 30

Voters to choose three:

Name	Votes	Percent	Outcome
Michael E. Busch, Dem.	24,075	21%	Won
Virginia P. Clagett, Dem.	24,036	21%	Won
Richard D'Amato, Dem.	20,223	18%	Won
Phillip D. Bissett, Rep.	18,690	16%	Lost
Edward J. Turner, Rep.	14,119	12%	Lost
Anthony McConkey, Rep.	12,353	11%	Lost

- 1994 Race for Maryland House of Delegates – District 30

Voters to choose three:

Name	Votes	Percent	Outcome
Michael E. Busch, Dem.	18,709	19%	Won
Phillip D. Bissett, Rep.	18,009	23%	Won
Virginia P. Clagett, Dem.	18,254	18%	Won
Ralph C. Rosacker, Rep.	16,299	16%	Lost
Joan Beck, Rep.	15,974	16%	Lost
John C. Eldridge Jr., Dem.	13,320	13%	Lost
