= Ron George (politician) =

American politician

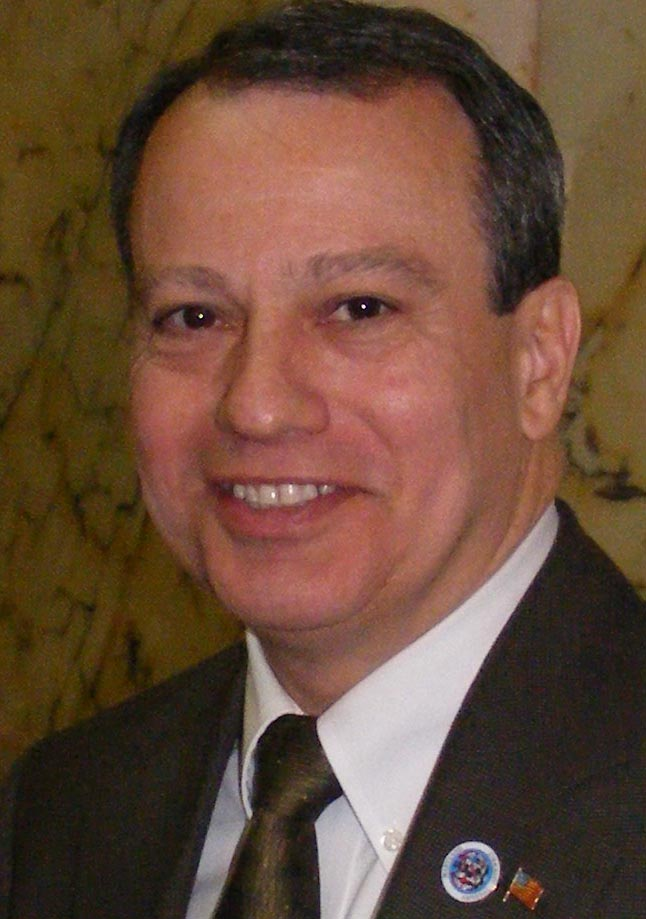

Member of the Maryland House of Delegates from the 30th district
- In office January 10, 2007 – January 14, 2015
- Preceded by: Herbert McMillan
- Succeeded by: Seth A. Howard

Personal details
- Born: August 30, 1953 (age 73) Syracuse, New York, U.S.
- Party: Republican
- Education: Syracuse University; Institute for the Psychological Sciences

Ronald Alan George (born August 30, 1953) is an American politician who was a Republican member of the Maryland House of Delegates from 2007 to 2015. He first represented the 30th district in from 2007 to 2010, after which he was redrawn into the 33rd district. He sought the Republican nomination for Governor of Maryland in 2014, but finished fourth in the primary. In December 2014, George expressed interest in being appointed to the District 33 House of Delegates seat vacated by Cathy Vitale, who was appointed a judge. George unsuccessfully ran for the state Senate in District 30 in 2018; this district includes Annapolis.

George has been a successful Maryland business owner for over 20 years. He owns Ron George Jewelers located in Annapolis and formerly in Severna Park.

== Biography ==
Born in Syracuse, New York, August 30, 1953. Master goldsmith certificate, jewelry design and repair, Bowman Technical School for Jewelry Making and Design, Lancaster, Pennsylvania, 1972. Syracuse University, B.A. (visual & performing arts), 1978. Institute for Psychological Sciences, M.S. (clinical), 2005. Jeweler. Owner, Ron George Jewelry & Repair, 1987–91; Ron George Jewelers, Inc., 1991–present; State House Inn, 2002–07. Volunteer counselor, Covenant House (emergency youth shelter), New York, 1979–81. Volunteer Director, Conquest Boys Club, 1996–2002. National Board member, Traditions of Roman Catholic Homes (home-schooling support organization), 1998-. Volunteer Executive Director, Springhill Center for Family Development, 2002–08. Member, Annapolis Business Association; Maryland Chamber of Commerce; National Federation of Independent Businesses. Ronald Reagan Award, Annapolis Republican Central Committee, 2005. Legislator of the Year, Annapolis/Anne Arundel Chamber of Commerce, 2008. Distinguished Service Award, Republican Women of Anne Arundel County, 2009. Former Sunday School teacher, St. Mary's Catholic Church, Annapolis. Married; six children, two grandchildren.

As a delegate in the Maryland House of Delegates, George served on the Ways and Means Committee, the Transportation, Education, and Election Law subcommittees, the Sportsmans Caucus, and the Veterans Caucus. George founded Maryland's Doctors Caucus and advisory board.

== Gubernatorial campaign ==
Delegate George announced his candidacy for Governor of Maryland on June 5, 2013. During his announcement speech, George unveiled his 10 Point Promise. The Promise calls for building the tax base in Baltimore City, creating safe school zones in Baltimore modeled after the Harlem Children's Zone, conducting independent audits of all state agencies, and lowering corporate and unemployment taxes among other initiatives. This plan prompted the Baltimore Sun Editorial Board on July 17, 2013, to name George "The leader so far in providing a specific platform". George finished last in the primary, behind Larry Hogan, who won the nomination, David Craig, and Charles Lollar.

== Legislative record ==
- Voted against in-state tuition for illegal immigrants in 2007 (HB6)
- Sponsored Wind Energy at Greenbury Point in 2010 (HJ7)
- Sponsored Lawful Presence Requirement for Maryland Drivers Licenses (HB195)
- Sponsored Voltage Regulation Technology - Income Tax Subtraction Modification (HB320)
- Sponsored Local Correctional Facilities - New Construction - Residential Programs for Substance Abuse Treatment (HB967)
- Co-Sponsored Intellectual Disability (Rosa's Law) (HB20)
- Co-Sponsored State Property Tax - Homeowner's Property Tax Assessment Cap Reduction (HB156)
- Co-Sponsored State Retirement and Pension System - Military Service Credit (HB191)
- Co-Sponsored Silver Alert Program - Establishment (HB317)
- Co-Sponsored Sales and Use Tax - Exemptions - Veterans' Organizations (HB317)
- Co-Sponsored Natural Resources - Oysters - Dredge Devices (ban repealed. Chapter) (HB218)

== Election results ==
2006 Maryland House of Delegates, 30th district
Party	Candidate	Votes	%
Democratic	Michael E. Busch	22,479	17.1
Democratic	Virginia P. Clagett	22,360	17.0
Republican	Ron George	21,811	16.6
Democratic	Barbara Samorajczyk	21,758	16.5
Republican	Andy Smarick	20,594	15.6
Republican	Ron Elfenbein	20,457	15.5
Constitution	David Whitney	2,225	1.7
Write-in		80	0.1

- 2010 Race for Maryland House of Delegates – 30th District

Voters to choose three:

Name	Votes	Percent	Outcome
Ron George, Rep.	25,631	19.25%	Won
Michael E. Busch, Dem.	23,995	18.02%	Won
Herb McMillan, Rep.	22,553	16.94%	Won
Virginia P. Clagett, Dem.	21,142	15.88%	Lost
Seth Howard, Rep.	20,080	15.08%	Lost
Judd Legum, Dem.	19,670	14.77%	Lost
Other Write-Ins	89	0.07%	

- 2014 Republican Gubernatorial Primary Election

Name	Votes	Percent	Outcome
Larry Hogan / Boyd Rutherford	92,376	43.0%	Won
David R. Craig / Jeannie Haddaway-Riccio	62,639	29.1%	Lost
Charles Lollar / Kenneth R. Timmerman	33,292	15.5%	Lost
Ron George / Shelley Aloi	26,628	12.4%	Lost

- 2018 Race for Maryland Senate – 30th District

Name	Votes	Percent	Outcome
Sarah K. Elfreth, Dem.	29,736	53.8%	Won
Ron George, Rep.	24,639	44.6%	Lost
Christopher Wallace, Sr., Lib.	826	1.5%	Lost
Other Write-Ins	38	0.1%	

== Volunteer work ==
Prior to his jewelry work, George was a volunteer counselor at Covenant House in New York City for two years. He has also been a volunteer director for the Conquest Boys' Club, volunteering from 1996 until 2002. He has been working for the Springhill Center for Family Development since 2002 and has been a National Board member of Traditions of Roman Catholic Homes, a home-schooling support organization, since 1998.

Ron George is also a member of the Annapolis Business Association, the Maryland Chamber of Commerce, and the National Federation of Independent Businesses. He received the Ronald Reagan Award from the Annapolis Republican Central Committee in 2005. Additionally, he is a Sunday School teacher for St. Mary's Roman Catholic Church in Annapolis.

== Acting career ==
George is a member of the Screen Actors Guild. He has made appearances in movies such as Chances Are and Broadcast News. He has also appeared in The Doctors, a soap opera, in the late 1970s.
