= Maryland Environmental Trust =

U.S. land trust

- Abbreviation: MET
- Formation: 1967; 58 years ago
- Headquarters: Crownsville, Maryland
- Board Chair: Major Gary S. Burnett
- Director: John Turgeon
- Website: dnr.maryland.gov/met/Pages/default.aspx

The Maryland Environmental Trust (MET) is a land trust and quasi-public entity affiliated with the Maryland Department of Natural Resources and governed by a private Board of Trustees. It was established by the Maryland General Assembly in 1967.

== Establishment ==
The Maryland General Assembly created the Trust in 1967:

... to conserve, improve, stimulate, and perpetuate the aesthetic, natural, health and welfare, scenic, and cultural qualities of the environment, including, but not limited to land, water, air, wildlife, scenic qualities, open spaces, buildings or any interest therein, and other appurtenances pertaining in any way to the State. Through educational and other means, the Trust shall encourage and motivate the populace of the State and others to do so and shall promote continuing interest in and the study of these matters. The purpose of the Trust is of general benefit to the citizens of the State, and it is charitable in nature.

== Mission statement ==
The mission of the Maryland Environmental Trust is to provide landowners with information and tools to permanently protect natural, historic and scenic resources in the state.

== Operation ==
The Maryland Environmental Trust serves as the statewide land trust and holds over 1,107 conservation easements permanently protecting over 136,268 acres (55,146 ha) in Maryland. Its programs include Land Conservation, Monitoring and Stewardship, Local Land Trust Assistance and the Keep Maryland Beautiful Grants Program. The Land Conservation Program assists landowners with permanently protecting the natural, scenic and/or historic resources of their land primarily with conservation easements. Some of the properties that the MET currently protects through conservation easements include Sagamore Farm, Holly Hill, Summerseat Farm, Mount Harmon, Daniel Sheffer Farm, Tyrconnell (Towson, Maryland), Maidstone (Owings, Maryland), the Smithsonian Environmental Research Center (SERC), Wye House in Talbot County and over 8,000 acres (3,200 ha) of historic land surrounding the Civil War battlefields of Antietam, Monocacy, South Mountain and the Battle of Crampton's Gap. The Maryland Environmental Trust is a member of the Land Trust Alliance.

== Board of trustees ==
The Maryland Environmental Trust is governed by a 19-member Board of Trustees with 15 trustees as volunteer citizens representing diverse areas of the state. The remaining three trustees are ex-officio members: the Governor, Speaker of the House, and President of the Senate. The Trust is assisted by Area Representatives who work directly with the Board.
