= Tyrconnell (Towson, Maryland) =

Historic house in Maryland, United States

- U.S. National Register of Historic Places
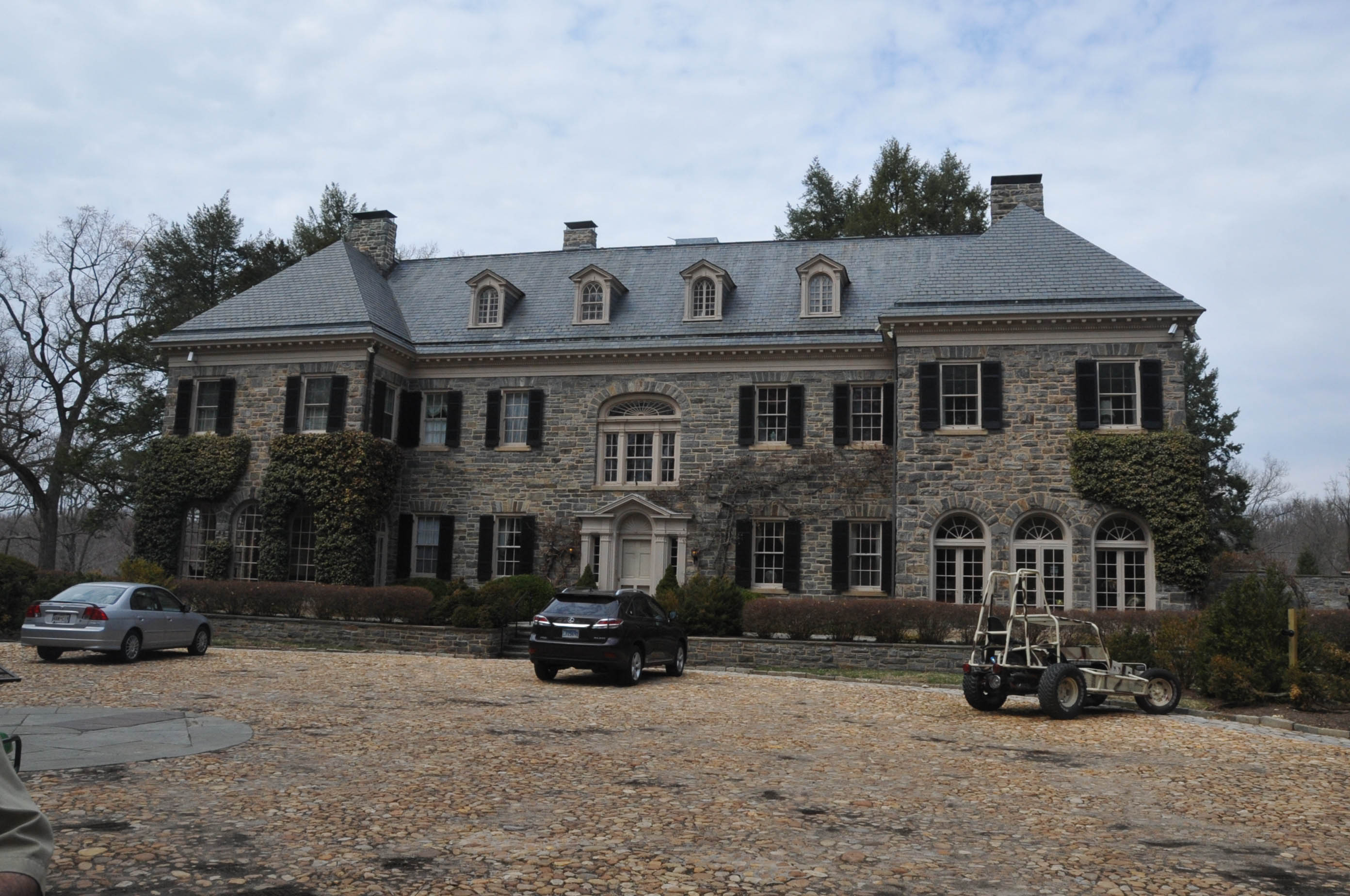

- Location within Maryland Location within the United States
- Location: 120 Woodbrook Lane, Towson, Maryland
- Coordinates: 39°22′48″N 76°38′3″W
- Area: 27 acres (11 ha)
- Built: 1919
- Architect: Mottu & White; Paul, Arthur Folsom
- Architectural style: Colonial Revival
- NRHP reference No.: 85000582
- Added to NRHP: March 14, 1985

Tyrconnell is a historic home located in Baltimore County, Maryland, United States. It is a 2 1/2-story stone house set on 27 acres (110,000 m^{2}) which contain several significant gardens by the landscape architect Arthur Folsom Paul. The house was designed by the Baltimore firm of Mottu and White in 1919, in Colonial Revival style. Also on the property is a frame gardeners’ house, a grouping of four barns and a shed, a garage, and two stone spring houses.

Tyrconnell was listed on the National Register of Historic Places in 1973 and is protected by conservation easements held by Maryland Environmental Trust.
