= Encasement =

Encasement is the coating over, covering or "encasing" of all building components, interior and exterior. This includes all roofing and toxic hazards materials, such as asbestos, lead-based paint, mold/mildew and other harmful substances, found in buildings. The technique of encasing all building components, including unsafe ones, with green coatings is by far the most efficient way to reduce the harmful effects on people and the environment while lengthening the life of buildings. It is an economical alternative to other abatement methods such as removal, disposal and replacement.

Encasement with green coatings is a long-term, sustainable, and renewable solution compared to typical paints or coatings which only last a few years. In place management and restoration with encasement green coatings is the best and most practical way to extend a buildings life along with safely dealing with most of its components.

Encasement is also less disruptive of ongoing services. It does not require shutting down buildings or having to relocate occupants, which is costly and time-consuming. Most work can be completed with minimal amount of time and with no building disruption at all.

Encasement with green coatings can result in savings of 25% to 75% over removal and replacement, and extend the life of most building surfaces.

Green coatings have no environmental downside to using them. They are non-toxic, water based, low VOCs, (volatile organic compounds), no ODS (Ozone Depleting Substances), and Class A fire rated. The products are backed up with toxicological reports proving that they are so clean, that pregnant women and children can be present when applying them.

Green coatings used for encasement should be extremely durable, long lasting and able to take a lot of abuse. They must be especially flexible; being able to elongate with the expanding and contracting of any typical building movements.

== Abatement methods ==
Since the early 1980s, four major methods have been used for the abatement of Asbestos-Containing Materials (ACM) and Lead-Based Paint (LBP).

Enclosures – Dust-tight barriers such as sheetrock or plywood are erected to protect against the release of the hazardous material into the environment. When the enclosure is eventually removed, the hazardous material is once again exposed and it usually has become more friable and prone to being released into the atmosphere. Care must be taken to insure that untrained or uninformed workers do not re-expose the hazardous surfaces unknowingly and endanger themselves and/or the inhabitants by causing a release into the environment.

Encapsulation – A coating material that passes U.S. Environmental Protection Agency-specified (EPA) ASTM (American Society for Testing Materials) tests is applied over a surface to prevent the release of hazardous materials into the atmosphere. A problem experienced with encapsulants in some cases is that the added weight of the encapsulant can cause ACM fireproofing on ceilings or walls to delaminate. A second potential problem with encapsulants is that if the coating is compromised (e.g. by a forklift truck running into a column that has been encapsulated, the potential for release of the hazardous material into the environment is once again present. With LBP, a significant amount of scraping of loose, flaking paint is often required to provide a stable surface before the encapsulant that is applied can be expected to achieve adequate adhesion.

Encasement – A 2-coat system which also passes EPA-specified ASTM testing wherein the first coat (primer) stabilizes the substrate by penetrating into the friable ACM and through the loose flaking paint and cures into a flexible film that mitigates these hazardous properties. The second coat bonds to the topcoat providing a tough, long-lasting, monolithic, composite coating system that prevents the release of any hazardous material into the environment. Because of the penetration of the primer, the adhesion of the overall system is increased. A necessity as the weight of the system increases. Additionally if the outer coat is compromised in any manner, there is little or no risk of the hazardous material being released because the surface-stabilizing primer has mitigated the brittle, chalky and friable properties of the hazardous surface. In a very real sense, encasement can be viewed as "stabilization + encapsulation".

Removal and Replacement- removal of ACM or LBP causes the release of asbestos fibers and lead dust that can become airborne subjecting installers and/or occupants to the risk of inhaling the particulate matter. Based on industry trends, the increased risk associated with this method has led building owners and contractors to select this as the least preferred method and a last resort unless the ACM is in a friable condition. Due to its high cost and risk factors, only certified and insured abatement professionals should perform this method. If a party is exposed to these risks and are affected, symptoms of various diseases such as asbestosis, a scarring of lung tissue that leads to difficulty in breathing and mesothelioma (an always fatal cancer of the lung's external lining) may not appear for 15 years. In addition, removal and replacement is time-consuming, carries high insurance costs, causes building use downtime and requires relocation of occupants. It also requires the disposal of the hazardous materials, which alone can amount to 30% of total abatement costs. Consequently, an ever-increasing number of building owners choose alternative in place management methods.

== Pros and cons of encasement ==
| PROS | CONS |
|---|---|
| Installation does not disturb asbestos fibers or lead dust | The hazardous materials remain in place, if catastrophic damage occurs they may be released into the surrounding environment |
| Conforms to safety measures for installers and occupants of dwellings during implementation of corrective actions | |
| Lasts for the life of the building | |
| Minimal to no relocation of building occupants | |
| Can be installed after work hours thereby limiting downtime in an organization | |
| Does not affect the fireproof rating of the structure | |
| Retains the superior fireproofing qualities of asbestos | |
| Prevents lead leachate | |
| No need to scarify surfaces, remove walls or trim | |
| Non-destructive—permits preservation of architectural features (wood, plaster, metals, etc.) | |
| Excellent protection and preservation | |
| Water-based (safe), non-toxic, low VOCs | |
| Can be custom tinted | |
| Protects surfaces from damage | |
| Hazardous waste in place management eliminates hazardous material waste transport and disposal | |

== Additional facts ==
- Encasement has significant benefits in almost every application, and can be applied to fireproofing, asbestos-containing paint, plaster, block etc. If the building has a 5-10yr life span remaining, or more, encasement offers major benefits. And for due diligence purposes encased areas should be inspected regularly as one would inspect other building components as part of a regular inspection cycle.
- The encasement system does not negatively affect fire ratings and adds a minimal amount of additional fire rating (about 5–10 minutes). The membrane is non-toxic and will not release any harmful compounds during a fire. This is evidenced by the results of the UPITT testing conducted on this product which showed no acute lethality of thermal decomposition of the product. Furthermore, the flame and smoke spread are such that there is no propagation of fire events.
- The encasement product has undergone extensive testing for fire rating, water vapour transmission, adhesion and cohesion, mold growth, ageing and weathering, elongation, etc. The technical data sheet includes a listing of these tests and other ASTM tests, government approvals, acceptances, and listings.
- Any asbestos, mold or lead paint remediation contractor is capable of dealing with the hazards of these materials, and with the right equipment, application is not difficult. Painters familiar with airless sprayers can also perform the work, provided that they are trained in the hazards of the material they are coating. There is no formal approval process; however, for the warranty to be applied the installation must be inspected by the manufacturer's agent prior, during, and after completion of the applied encasement system.

== Application of encasement ==
Encasement is defined by the U.S. Environmental Protection Agency as a, "Spray applied enclosure" abatement method that safely and economically seals and encloses exposed hazardous material surfaces. Encasement differs from encapsulation in that it is a long-term solution; the materials are thicker, applied from 7 to 40 mils depending upon surface conditions, building use and desired warranty, are impact resistant and can allow for mechanical fasteners to be adhered to the surface. Materials used for this method should be water-based and must possess elastomeric properties. The outer shell of the encasement is highly resistant to damage from ultra-violet light, heat, water, acids, accidental or direct impact, seismic and mechanical occurrences. This method is installed without disturbing the asbestos fibers and lead dust, requires minimal to no relocation and can be installed after work hours thereby limiting downtime in an organization.

The coating materials that make up the basic encasement system are water-based acrylic elastomers that contain no volatile organic compounds (VOCs). As such they are very safe to work with. A corrosion-inhibiting version of the primer is used when dealing with metal surfaces. Spraying, brushing or rolling may be used to apply all of the products and cleanup is with water. Use of a coating technology-based solution such as encasement usually results in savings of 50-80 percent when compared with the cost of removal and replacement, not including comparable savings in relocation costs in many cases. According to the U.S. EPA, to qualify as an approved 20-year encapsulant/encasement system for use over LBP the coatings must pass a series of ASTM performance tests that are encompassed by ASTM E1795-97. Little or no hazardous waste is generated. Because this is elastomeric technology, cracking, chipping or peeling will never occur.

== See also ==
- Abatement
- Asbestos
- Brushing
- Carcinogen
- Coating
- Encapsulation
- U.S. Environmental Protection Agency (EPA)
- Lead
- Ozone Depletion
- Rolling
- Spraying
