= Anne Arundel County Public Library =

Public library system in Maryland, United States

Coordinates: 38.9807°N 76.5685°W

Anne Arundel County Public Library (AACPL)
- Location: Anne Arundel County, Maryland
- Type: Public Library
- Established: 1921
- Branches: 16

Other information
- Director: Skip Auld
- Website: www.aacpl.net

Anne Arundel County Public Library (AACPL) is a public library system located in central Maryland. Established in 1921 as the Annapolis and Anne Arundel County Public Library, Inc, the system now includes 16 locations throughout Anne Arundel County, Maryland.

== Branches ==
- Administrative Offices, 5 Harry S. Truman Parkway, Annapolis, MD 21401
- Broadneck, 1275 Green Holly Drive, Annapolis, MD 21409
- Brooklyn Park, 1 East 11th Avenue, Baltimore, MD 21225
- Michael E. Busch Annapolis Library, 1410 West Street, Annapolis, MD 21401
- Crofton, 1681 Riedel Road, Crofton, MD 21114
- Deale, 5940 Deale-Churchton Road, Deale, MD 20751
- Discoveries: The Library at the Mall, 2250 Annapolis Mall Road, Annapolis, MD 21401
- Eastport-Annapolis Neck, 269 Hillsmere Drive, Annapolis, MD 21403
- Edgewater, 25 Stepneys Lane, Edgewater, MD 21037
- Glen Burnie, 1010 Eastway, Glen Burnie, MD 21060
- Linthicum, 400 Shipley Road, Linthicum, MD 21090
- Maryland City at Russett, 3501 Russett Common, Laurel, MD 20724
- Mountain Road, 4730 Mountain Road, Pasadena, MD 21122
- Odenton, 1325 Annapolis Road, Odenton, MD 21113
- Riviera Beach, 1130 Duvall Hwy, Pasadena, MD 21122
- Severn, 2624 Annapolis Road, Severn, MD 21144
- Severna Park, 45 West McKinsey Road, Severna Park, MD 21146

== History ==
The first known public library in Anne Arundel County opened on Jan. 8, 1921, located inside Annapolis City Hall. A library card cost a reported 10 cents at the time. The Glen Burnie Free Public Library opened in 1923 in a Masonic Temple located on Crain Highway. The Public Library Association of Annapolis and Anne Arundel County was incorporated in 1936. According to some reports, Eliza Suydam was the first librarian in the system.

The Annapolis library moved to a location on Church Circle in 1939. The Farmers Bank of Maryland deeded the property to the Public Library Association of Anne Arundel County from 1939-1974.

As part of the Annapolis and Anne Arundel Library System, the Glen Burnie Library formed as a branch library in 1953 located in Glen Burnie High School. Later, the Glen Burnie library moved to a house on Cotter Road in the Harundale neighborhood. It moved again to the Kuethe Library, where it remained until 1991. The Kuethe Library still exists but is not part of the AACPL system. The North County library opened at 1010 Eastway, an access road parallel to Route 2, in 1969. It was renamed Glen Burnie Regional Library in 2014, and renamed again in 2019 as the Glen Burnie library

In 1969 the West County Area Library opened in a church building provided by the Soroptimist Club of Severn. In 2004 it moved to its current location on Annapolis Road and was renamed Odenton library.

In 1961, the Riviera Beach Library opened in a rented store in Pasadena, Maryland. It moved to its present location on Fort Smallwood Road in 1971. This location is undergoing renovation and the library was relocated to a temporary site in 2022.

The first library in Severna Park was located in the former Baltimore and Annapolis Railroad Station building beginning in 1960. In 1972 it moved to its iconic round building on West McKinsey Road.

AACPL opened Discoveries at the Westfield Annapolis Mall as pilot program in 2018. It contains a programming room and a community pantry, and laptop computers are available for use. The location has become a permanent part of the library system.

The system's newest facility is the Michael E. Busch Annapolis Library, which replaced the aging Annapolis Regional Library building. The new library is located on the same site as the previous library and opened in 2020 and cost a reported $24 million. It is named for Michael E. Busch, former Delegate and Speaker of the Maryland House of Delegates representing Annapolis.

== Statistics ==
- 16 locations
- More than one million books and other materials available to borrow
- 1.3 million customers in 2020

== Governance ==
AACPL is governed by a board of trustees composed of 17 volunteer members, directors, and executive committee officers. Seven members are nominated by the County Council, and one is recommended by the County Executive. All members of the Board of Library Trustees are appointed by the Board of Library Trustees to three-year terms.

== Happenings Newsletter ==
AACPL publishes a quarterly newsletter titled Happenings. The newsletter showcases upcoming events, programs, and information about the library system.

== Privileges ==
AACPL is part of the Maryland State Library System. As the state library agency for Maryland, the Maryland State Library Agency administers State and Federal funds to support Maryland libraries. Maryland residents are entitled to obtain a library card at no charge from any county or Baltimore City public library.

== See also ==
- List of libraries
- Anne Arundel County, Maryland
- Maryland
- Public library
