= Maryland Hall for the Creative Arts =

Art Center in Annapolis, Maryland, US

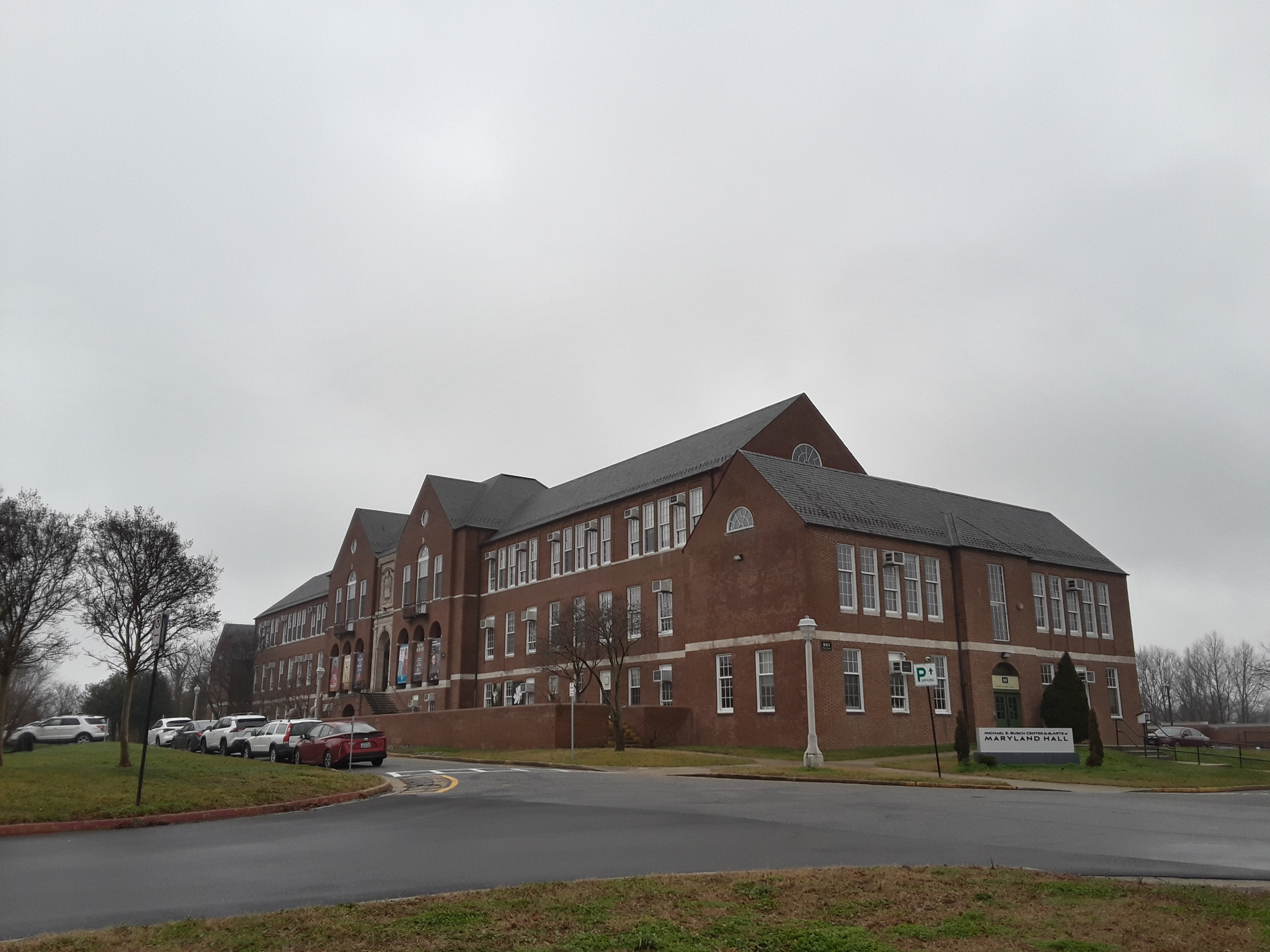
- Maryland Hall for the Creative Arts in late January, 2024
- Interactive map of Maryland Hall for the Creative Arts
- Location: 801 Chase Street, Annapolis, Maryland 21401
- Coordinates: 38.9738194°N 76.5057112°W

The Maryland Hall for the Creative Arts is a multi-disciplinary arts center in Annapolis, Maryland which offers opportunities in the arts for individuals of all ages, skill levels and backgrounds. It was founded in 1979 to promote art appreciation and education in Maryland.

Maryland Hall offers year-round arts classes for children, teens and adults. Classes are available in drawing, painting, dance, drama, crafts and clay/ceramics. There are three semesters each year, Winter/Spring, Summer and Fall.

Maryland Hall also houses five gallery spaces: the Earl Gallery, the Martino Gallery, the Openshaw Balcony Gallery, and the Micro Gallery. Exhibitions are mounted year-round and gallery admission is free and open to the public. An Artist-In-Residence program also provides studio space to local and visiting visual artists.

Maryland Hall's performing arts program presents national and international artists, children's entertainment, local musicians, independent film and free performances. The four resident programs: Ballet Theatre of Maryland, Annapolis Opera, the Live Arts Maryland, and the Annapolis Symphony Orchestra also perform in Maryland Hall's 725-seat theater. The hall is located at 801 Chase Street in Annapolis, in the facility of the former Annapolis High School.
