= John Astle =

American politician (born 1943)

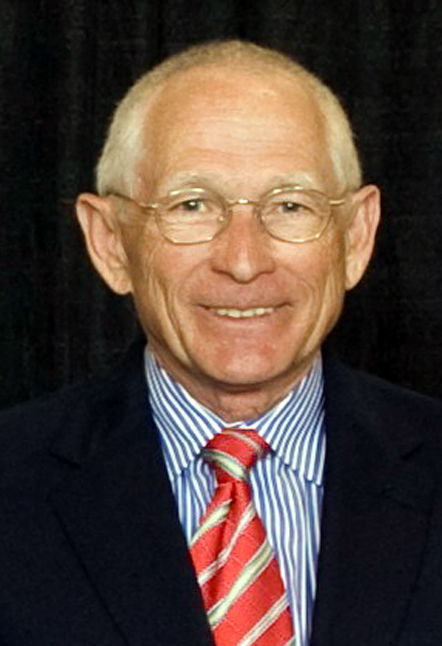

Member of the Maryland Senate from the 30th district
- In office January 11, 1995 – January 9, 2019
- Preceded by: Gerald W. Winegrad
- Succeeded by: Sarah Elfreth

Member of the Maryland House of Delegates from the 30th district
- In office January 1983 – January 11, 1995
- Preceded by: Gerald W. Winegrad
- Succeeded by: Virginia P. Clagett

Personal details
- Born: John Chandlee Astle; March 31, 1943 (age 83) Charles Town, West Virginia, U.S.
- Party: Democratic
- Education: Marshall University (BA); Catholic University of America
- Occupation: Military pilot (retired)
- Awards: Legion of Merit; Purple Heart (2)

Military service
- Allegiance: United States of America
- Branch/service: U.S. Marine Corps
- Years of service: 1961–1996
- Rank: Colonel
- Battles/wars: Vietnam War; Desert Storm

John Chandlee Astle (born March 31, 1943) is an American politician from Maryland and a member of the Democratic Party. He served four terms in the Maryland State Senate and three terms in the Maryland House of Delegates representing Maryland's district 30 in Anne Arundel County.

== Background ==
Astle was born in Charles Town, West Virginia, and grew up in Barboursville. He graduated in 1966 from Marshall University in Huntington, West Virginia, and attended the Catholic University of America.

== Military service — United States Marine Corps ==
He joined the United States Marine Corps Reserve in 1961 and received a commission as an officer in the Marine Corps through its Platoon Leaders Class program upon graduation from Marshall. He was a Naval Aviator flying helicopters and left active duty with the rank of captain. He also flew the presidential helicopter for three and a half years.

He retired from the Marine Corps Reserves as a colonel after 30 years of service. He saw combat in Vietnam, earning 34 Air Medals and 2 Purple Hearts. He was recalled to active duty for Desert Storm.

== Political career ==
John R. Astle (left), a law student from North Carolina, and John C. Astle (right), Maryland State Senator. Photo taken in the Maryland Senate Chambers, Summer 2003

Astle was originally elected to the Maryland House of Delegates in 1982. He was elected to the State Senate in 1994 and was Vice-Chair of the Senate Finance Committee from 2003 to 2019.

Astle ran unsuccessfully for mayor of Annapolis in 2017, losing in the Democratic primary. Astle also ran for mayor in 1981, losing by 243 votes in the general election.

== Election results ==
- 1990 race for Maryland House of Delegates – District 30

Voters to choose three:

Name	Votes	Percent	Outcome
John C. Astle, Dem.	18,009	23%	Won
Aris Allen, Rep.	16,951	22%	Won
Michael E. Busch, Dem.	16,104	18%	Won
Edith Segree, Dem.	14,341	18%	Lost
Phillip Bissett, Rep.	13,321	17%	Lost
