= C. Richard D'Amato =

American politician (1942–2026)

United States-China Economic and Security Review Commission
- In office April 2001 – December 31, 2007

Member of the Maryland House of Delegates from the 30th district
- In office January 13, 1999 – January 8, 2003

Personal details
- Born: September 28, 1942 Rutherford, New Jersey, U.S.
- Died: September 5, 2026 (aged 83) Pasadena, Maryland, U.S.
- Party: Democratic
- Education: Cornell University (B.A.); Tufts University (M.A.; M.A.L.D.); Georgetown University (J.D.)
- Profession: Attorney, legislative aide/counsel, politician

Military service
- Branch/service: United States Navy Reserve
- Rank: Captain
- Battles/wars: Operation Desert Shield

Charles Richard D'Amato (September 28, 1942 – September 5, 2026) was an American attorney, politician and United States Navy Reserve captain best known for facilitating funding for military parapsychology research and conducting an investigation of unidentified flying objects as a senior staff counsel under the aegis of the influential Robert C. Byrd in the United States Senate.

== Life and career ==
D'Amato received a B.A. (cum laude) in political science from Cornell University in 1964; two M.A. degrees from the Fletcher School of Law and Diplomacy at Tufts University in 1967; and a J.D. from the Georgetown University Law Center in 1980. He was subsequently admitted to the Maryland and Washington, D.C. bars.

A member of the Democratic Party, D'Amato was the chief (1988-1995) and minority (1995-1998) counsel for the Senate Appropriations Committee. Working under Byrd (the committee's longtime chairman and Democratic ranking member), he coordinated and managed the annual appropriations bills and other legislation on policy and funding of U.S. international operations and programs, including trade, defense and the full range of foreign activities of the U.S. government.

In this role, D'Amato allegedly investigated the funding structure of a purported "black budget" (and potentially extra-governmental) Unacknowledged Special Access Program tasked with studying UFO phenomena, possibly encompassing "crash retrieval" artifacts stemming from the Roswell incident and analogous events. According to researcher Timothy Good, D'Amato "amassed a great deal of hearsay evidence [...] but was never able to gain access to the most sensitive information being withheld in the military and intelligence communities." In the course of his research, D'Amato liaised with a litany of prominent figures in ufology, including venture capitalist Jacques Vallée (as recounted by Vallée in his diaries) and alleged "experiencer" Whitley Strieber.

However, circa 2013, D'Amato issued a statement about the UFO inquiry on his now-defunct website in which he asserted: "[A] senior Senate Committee chairman asked me to conduct a preliminary inquiry into allegations that came to his attention regarding unidentified aerial crashes in the 1940s in New Mexico. I met with a number of people who had made public statements on the matter. I reported my conclusion to the Senator that the basis for such allegations did not appear to merit any further Senate investigation. Beyond this inquiry on behalf of the Senator, I have no personal opinion on the matter and consider the inquiry to have been closed for over 20 years."

While serving as chief counsel to the Appropriations Committee, D'Amato also played an integral role in funding the Stargate Project, the Defense Intelligence Agency's remote viewing research program, until its dissolution in 1995. According to Paul Smith, D'Amato was in a romantic relationship with "Robin," a remote viewer and former DIA Freedom of Information Office administrative assistant employed by the program, although it is unclear if their involvement prompted his support. Smith has postulated that "Robin" (who objected to military oversight of the research) enjoined D'Amato to "[grease] the wheels" in facilitating its transfer to the Central Intelligence Agency, which soon elected to terminate the program.

He also served as senior foreign policy counsel for Byrd. In this capacity, he drafted the resolution that set Senate standards for international global climate change treaty negotiations. He worked on a wide array of issues affecting U.S. international economic and political interests, such as World Trade Organization review legislation and burden-sharing agreements during the Gulf War.

Between 1980 and 1987, D'Amato was Byrd's director of political, economic, and national security policy during his tenure as Senate majority leader. He joined the congressional staff as legislative director for then-Representative Jim Jeffords (1975-1978) before serving as legislative assistant and then chief of staff to Senator Abraham Ribicoff (1978-1980).

Throughout his political career, D'Amato served in the United States Navy Reserve, attaining the rank of captain. Among other posts, he served as attache to the U.S. Embassy in Beijing on proliferation issues and military-to-military initiatives in March 1997; was detailed to the Battle Group Command Staff of the USS Dwight D. Eisenhower in the Red Sea during Operation Desert Shield; served as an operations officer directing air drops into Bosnia and Sarajevo; and was a member of the planning staff of the Asia-Pacific Center, a conference and study center in Honolulu. During the Vietnam War, he was an assistant professor of government at the United States Naval Academy from 1968 to 1971, where he also coached sailing and basketball teams. Beginning in 1998 and continuing to an unspecified date, he rejoined the Naval Academy faculty as an adjunct assistant professor of political science.

After leaving the Senate staff, he held elected office as a member of the Maryland House of Delegates from 1999 to 2003, representing an Annapolis, Maryland-based district. He served on the House's Appropriations Committee.

D'Amato was reappointed to the United States-China Economic and Security Review Commission by Senate Minority Leader Harry Reid on October 5, 2005, for a two-year term expiring December 31, 2007. He served as the chairman and vice chairman of the commission from April 2001 to December 20, 2005.

D'Amato died in Pasadena, Maryland, on September 5, 2026, at the age of 83.
