= List of Maryland state historical markers =

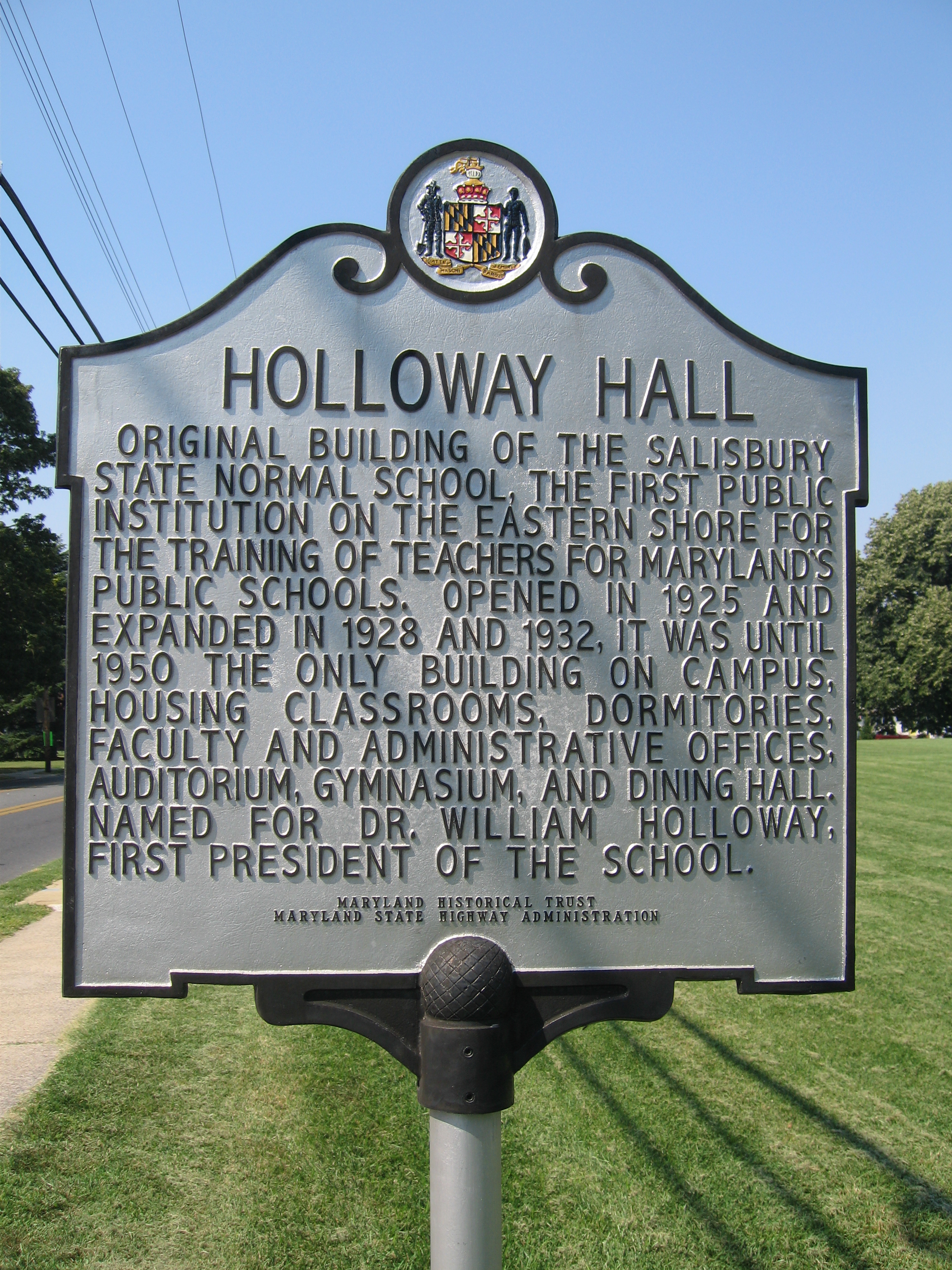
An example of a Maryland historical marker at Holloway Hall

This is a list of Maryland State Historical Markers which were first placed in Maryland in 1930. The Maryland Department of Transportation (MDOT), in partnership with the Maryland Historical Trust (MHT), reviews marker applications while the MDOT Maryland State Highway Administration (SHA) funds, installs, and maintains the markers along state roads and property. The current program was launched in 1933 due to an explosion of automobile ownership within the state. There were 766 markers as of October 2020.

== Markers by county ==
County	Sites
Allegany	22
Anne Arundel	48
Baltimore City	28
Baltimore County	77
Calvert	30
Caroline	13
Carroll	20
Cecil	71
Charles	49
Dorchester	19
Frederick	24
Garrett	19
Harford	51
Howard	19
Kent	22
Montgomery	22
Prince George's	59
Queen Anne's	29
Saint Mary's	20
Somerset	26
Talbot	30
Washington	43
Wicomico	15
Worcester	10
Total	766
