= List of Maryland state historical markers in Allegany County =

This is a list of the Maryland state historical markers in Allegany County.

This is intended to be a complete list of the official state historical markers placed in Allegany County, Maryland by the Maryland Historical Trust (MHT). The locations of the historical markers, as well as the latitude and longitude coordinates as provided by the MHT's database, are included below. There are currently 22 historical markers located in Allegany County.

Marker title	Image	City	Location	Topics
Billmeyer Game Refuge		Hancock, Maryland	Mountain Road (west side), 0.35 miles south of US 40; 39°41′17.4″N 78°25′21″W	
Braddock's Road		Cumberland, Maryland	Fayette Street, Greene Street, and Braddock Road, west corner 39°38′57.0″N 78°47′03.1″W	
Church of St. Patrick, Cumberland		Cumberland, Maryland	201 N. Center St., at Market St., Cumberland; 39°39′17.64″N 78°45′51.78″W	
First Toll Gate House		Lavale, Maryland	US 40 Alt. (south side), west of Winchester Road; 39°38′16.91″N 78°51′09.49″W	
Folck's Mill		Cumberland, Maryland	I-68 (east bound), west of exit 46 (MD 220 to Bedford); 39°40′22.993″N 78°43′30.827″W	
Folck's Mill		Cumberland, Maryland	Ali Ghan Temple, 13100 Ali Ghan Road NE; 39°40′15.4128″N 78°43′18.4152″W	
George's Creek Valley		Frostburg, Maryland	MD 36 at Old Country Rd; 39°38′10.34″N 78°55′02.51″W	
Headquarters of George Washington		Cumberland, Maryland	Washington Street at Prospect Square, south side in courthouse lawn 39°39′03.5″N 78°46′01.5″W	
Jane Frazier		Cumberland, Maryland	MD 51 (southbound), south of Messick Road; 39°37′29.39″N 78°44′03.59″W	
Martin's Plantation		Frostburg, Maryland	US 40 Alt. (south side) at MD 36, in front of Bealle High School; 39°39′04.79″N 78°54′48.6″W	
Michael Cresap		Oldtown, Maryland	Opessa Street (north side) at Green Spring Road; 39°32′30.59″N 78°36′42″W	
Mount Savage Iron Works		Mount Savage, Maryland	New School Road (east side) at Calla Hill Road, 0.25 miles north of MD 36; 39°41′54.6″N 78°53′03.59″W	
Old Town (King Opessa's Town)		Oldtown, Maryland	MD 51 at Opessa Street/Bear Hill Road; 39°32′31.2″N 78°36′23.4″W	
Perry Barnes Game Refuge		Hancock, Maryland	Mountain Road (east side), 0.15 miles south of US 40; 39°41′21.59″N 78°25′33.6″W	
Site of Fort Cumberland		Cumberland, Maryland	Greene Street at Washington Street, southwest corner in Episcopal Church Yard; 39°39′02.4″N 78°45′52.8″W	
Spendelow Camp/The Camp at the Grove		Cumberland, Maryland	Vocke Road (southbound) at US 68 ramp 39°38′01.2″N 78°49′49.19″W	
The First Iron Rails		Cumberland, Maryland	US 40 Alt. (south side), 0.1 mile east of Old Mt. Savage Road; 39°40′12″N 78°47′30″W	
The Narrows		Cumberland, Maryland	US 40 Alt. (east side), 0.8 miles southeast of MD 36; 39°39′47.4″N 78°46′52.79″W	
The National Road		Lavale, Maryland	US 40 at Grant Drive; 39°38′57.59″N 78°49′03″W	
The Parade Ground of Fort Cumberland		Cumberland, Maryland	Washington Street at Prospect Square, southwest corner in courthouse lawn 39°39′03.4″N 78°45′59.9″W	
The Warrior's Path		Flintstone, Maryland	MD 144 (south side) 0.2 miles east of Murley's Branch Road; 39°42′06.59″N 78°33′51.59″W	
Washington's Road		Cumberland, Maryland	US 220 (east) at US 40, exit 68; 39°43′20.04″N 78°42′19.80″W	
