= List of Maryland state historical markers in Dorchester County =

This is a list of the Maryland state historical markers in Dorchester County.

This is intended to be a complete list of the official state historical markers placed in Dorchester County, Maryland by the Maryland Historical Trust (MHT). The locations of the historical markers, as well as the latitude and longitude coordinates as provided by the MHT's database, are included below. There are currently 19 historical markers located in Dorchester County.

Marker title	Image	City	Location	Topics
Appleby		Cambridge, Maryland	MD 341 (east side), 100 ft. north of Pennsylvania Avenue; 38°33′22.50″N 76°04′52.88″W	
Battle of The Ice Mound		Taylor's Island, Maryland	MD 16 (north side) at west end of bridge over Slaughter Creek; 38°28′10.41″N 76°17′39.78″W	
Bethlehem Methodist Episcopal Church		Taylor's Island, Maryland	Hooper Neck Road (west side), 0.2 miles north of Bay Shore Road; 38°28′56.22″N 76°18′57.70″W	
Cambridge		Cambridge, Maryland	South of Frederick C. Marlkus Bridge over the Choptank River; 38°34′16″N 76°03′51″W	
Chapel of Ease Old Trinity Episcopal Church		Taylor's Island, Maryland	Hooper Neck Road (east side), 0.6 miles south of Bay Shore Road; 38°28′15.12″N 76°18′31.99″W	
East New Market		East New Market, Maryland	MD 14 at MD 16, southwest corner 38°35′56.00″N 75°55′32.68″W	
Friendship Hall		East New Market, Maryland	MD 14, 1200 ft. east of MD 14/16, southwest corner 38°35′54.82″N 75°55′26.92″W	
Gary's Creek - Indian Path - Dorchester County		Lloyds, Maryland	MD 343 (south side), 0.1 mile west of Richardson Road; 38°35′16.73″N 76°10′41.16″W	
Glasgow		Cambridge, Maryland	Hambrooks Boulevard, 100 ft. west of Queen Anne Avenue; 38°35′00.77″N 76°05′03.26″W	
Harriet Tubman		Cambridge vicinity, Maryland	Greenbriar Road (south), 1 mile west of Bucktown Road; 38°27′32.3″N 76°02′54.7″W	
Hoopers Island		Honga, Maryland	MD 335 (west side), 200 ft. south of bridge over Fishing Creek; 38°20′50.62″N 76°13′38.27″W	
My Lady Sewall's Manor		Secretary, Maryland	North of MD 14 behind Our Lady of Good Council Roman Catholic Church; 38°36′37.96″N 75°57′01.42″W	
Patty Cannon's House		Reliance, Maryland	MD 392 at MD 577, northwest corner 38°38′07.70″N 75°42′29.28″W	
Rehoboth		Eldorado, Maryland	MD 14 at MD 313, northwest corner 38°35′02.86″N 75°47′19.41″W	
Spocott Windmill		Lloyds, Maryland	MD 343 (south side), 0.3 miles west of Richardson Road; 38°35′20.77″N 76°10′49.87″W	
St. Mary Star of the Sea Chapel and Cemetery - Tubman Chapel		Honga, Maryland	MD 335 (north side), 0.2 miles east of Meekins Neck Road; 38°23′11.21″N 76°14′51.77″W	
Stanley Institute		Cambridge, Maryland	MD 16 at Bayly Road, northeast corner 38°32′41.81″N 76°06′10.12″W	
Thomas Holliday Hicks		Cambridge, Maryland	Academy Street at Cemetery Avenue, inside cemetery fence 38°34′00.13″N 76°04′33.44″W	
Unnacokossimmon - Emperor to the Nanticoke Indians		Vienna, Maryland	MD 331 (east side), 0.1 mile north of MD 731; 38°29′16.72″N 75°49′36.46″W	
