= List of Maryland state historical markers in Cecil County =

This is a list of the Maryland state historical markers in Cecil County.

This is intended to be a complete list of the official state historical markers placed in Cecil County, Maryland by the Maryland Historical Trust (MHT). The locations of the historical markers, as well as the latitude and longitude coordinates as provided by the MHT's database, are included below. There are currently 71 historical markers located in Cecil County.

Marker title	Image	City	Location	Topics
A Susquehannock Indian Fort		Octoraro, Maryland	MD 222 (Susquehanna River Road), northbound, 1.5 miles south of US 1; 39°39′41.81″N 76°09′30.76″W	
Bald Friar Ford and Ferry		Rising Sun, Maryland	US 222 (southbound) at Old Conowingo Road; 39°41′55″N 76°10′26″W	
Blue Ball Tavern		Blue Ball, Maryland	MD 273 (westbound) at Blue Ball Road; 39°42′01″N 75°55′55″W	
Bohemia		Hack Point, Maryland	MD 213 (northbound), 1 mile south of Bohemia River; 39°26′51″N 75°52′09″W	
Bohemia Mannor		Cayots Corner, Maryland	MD 213 (southbound), 0.5 mile north of Bohemia River; 39°27′57″N 75°51′54″W	
Brick Meeting House		Calvert, Maryland	Brick Meeting House Road, east of MD 273; 39°42′02.44″N 75°58′55.58″W	
Brookland		Perryville, Maryland	St. Marks Church Road, 0.3 mile east of MD 222; 39°35′00″N 76°04′20″W	
C & D Canal		Chesapeake City, Maryland	MD 213 (southbound) at Chesapeake City Bridge; 39°32′06″N 75°48′39″W	
Calvert Village		Calvert, Maryland	MD 273 (eastbound) at Rosebank Lane; 39°42′10″N 75°58′53″W	
Captain Michael Rudulph		Charlestown, Maryland	Water Street; 39°34′15″N 75°58′25″W	
Charlestown		Charlestown, Maryland	Market Street at Bladen Street; 39°34′24″N 75°58′35″W	
Cherry Grove		Earleville, Maryland	Cherry Grove Road, 1 mile west of Stoney Battery Road; 39°27′40″N 75°55′30″W	
Count de Rochambeau's Troops		Perryville, Maryland	MD 7 at entrance to V.A. Hospital; 39°33′21″N 76°04′42″W	
Creswell Hall		Elkton, Maryland	MD 7, 0.3 mile east of MD 281; 39°36′19.45″N 75°49′01.47″W	
Cummings Tavern		Woodlawn, Maryland	MD 276, east of Dr. Jack Road; 39°38′04.59″N 76°04′35.18″W	
Elkton		Elkton, Maryland	MD 268 at MD 7; 39°36′28″N 75°49′47″W	
Elkton, Wedding Capital of the East		Elkton, Maryland	142 E. Main Street; 39°36′30″N 75°49′42.54″W	
Essex Lodge		Earlesville, Maryland	Glebe Road (southbound), 1.5 miles north of MD 282; 39°26′36″N 75°54′13″W	
Frenchtown		Elkton, Maryland	MD 213 at Frenchtown Road (northbound); 39°34′57″N 75°49′14″W	
George Washington		Warwick, Maryland	MD 282 (westbound), 1000 feet west of Church Road; 39°24′56″N 75°46′48″W	
George Washington Traveled This Road		Elkton, Maryland	135 E. Main Street; 39°36′31.30″N 75°49′40.04″W	
George Washington Traveled This Road		Perryville, Maryland	MD 7 in front of Rodger's Tavern; 39°33′25.25″N 76°04′40.85″W	
George Washington Traveled This Road		North East, Maryland	MD 7 at W. Cecil Avenue; 39°36′03.29″N 75°56′44.88″W	
George Washington Traveled This Road		Charlestown, Maryland	107 Cecil Road (behind museum); 39°34′27.53″N 75°58′42.33″W	
Gerry House		Port Deposit, Maryland	MD 222 (northbound), south of MD 276; 39°36′18″N 76°06′54″W	
Gilpin's Falls Covered Bridge		North East, Maryland	MD 272 (North East Road) east side, at bridge over North East Creek; 39°38′55.45″N 75°57′21.26″W	
Greenfield		Cecilton, Maryland	MD 213 (northbound), 1 mile south of MD 282; 39°23′23.04″N 75°52′16.31″W	
Hazelmore		Earlville, Maryland	Grove Neck Road (north side) at Hazelmoor Drive; 39°23′46.59″N 76°00′58.50″W	
Holly Hall		Elkton, Maryland	MD 213 at entrance to Big Elk Mall; 39°36′06″N 75°49′41″W	
James Rumsey		Warwick, Maryland	MD 282 (westbound) at Water Street; 39°25′08.79″N 75°46′30.18″W	
John A. J. Creswell		Port Deposit, Maryland	MD 222 (northbound) at MD 276; 39°36′18″N 76°06′55″W	
Labadie Tract		Cayots, Maryland	MD 310, 0.5 mile east of MD 213; 39°29′16″N 75°50′40″W	
Lt. Col. Nathaniel Ramsay		Charlestown, Maryland	Market Street, south of Bladen Street; 39°34′23.99″N 75°58′32.41″W	
Mitchell House		Elkton, Maryland	East Main Street; 39°36′31″N 75°49′42″W	
Mount Harmon Plantation Tobacco Prize House and Wharf		Earleville, Maryland	Grove Neck Road, 0.1 mile west of Pond Neck Road; 39°24′25″N 75°56′24″W	
Mount Pleasant		Earleville, Maryland	Grove Neck Road (westbound), 1 mile west of Sandy Bottom Road; 39°24′35″N 75°55′18″W	
New Castle and Frenchtown Railroad		Elkton, Maryland	MD 213 (southbound) at Lewis Shore Road; 39°34′25″N 75°48′58″W	
New Munster		Fair Hill, Maryland	MD 273, west of Elk Creek Bridge; 39°41′55.73″N 75°49′44.05″W	
North East		North East, Maryland	MD 7 (eastbound), 300 feet east of Northeast Creek Bridge; 39°36′03″N 75°56′49″W	
North Sassafras Parish (Episcopal)		Earleville, Maryland	MD 282 Spur at Glebe Road; 39°25′32″N 75°55′05″W	
Old Post Road - Lower Susquehanna Ferry - Rodgers' Tavern		Perryville, Maryland	MD 7 at entrance to V.A. Hospital; 39°33′25.01″N 76°04′42.53″W	
Old Post Road Established 1666 - Mason Dixon Line		Elkton, Maryland	MD 281 (northbound) at the Maryland-Delaware Line; 39°37′17″N 75°47′12″W	
Overlook of General Howe's Landing		Elk Neck, Maryland	Turkey Point Road, in front of Hart's United Methodist Church; 39°30′42.36″N 75°57′10.26″W	
Partridge Hill		Elkton, Maryland	Main Street; 39°36′26″N 75°49′54″W	
Richards Oak		Rising Sun, Maryland	US 1 (southbound) at Love Run Road; 39°41′38″N 76°06′51″W	
Rock Presbyterian Church		Fair Hill, Maryland	MD 273 (westbound) at Rock Church Road; 39°42′07″N 75°53′09″W	
Rock Run Mill		Port Deposit, Maryland	MD 222 at Granite Avenue; 39°36′50″N 76°07′34″W	
Rose Hill		Earleville, Maryland	Grove Neck Road (eastbound), 1.25 miles west of Pond Neck Road; 39°24′02″N 75°57′27″W	
Site of Chapel-of-Ease		Port Deposit, Maryland	MD 276 south of Dr. Jack Road; 39°38′0.3366″N 76°04′38.0064″W	
Site of Charlestown Wharf		Charlestown, Maryland	Water Street at Conestoga Street; 39°34′14″N 75°58′23″W	
Site of Fort Defiance		Elkton, Maryland	Old Field Point Road (southbound), north of Jones Chapel Road; 39°35′31.39″N 75°51′23.77″W	
Site of Fort Hollingsworth		Elkton, Maryland	Landing Lane at Old Field Point Road; 39°35′57″N 75°50′25″W	
Site of Woodlawn Camp Meeting		Woodlawn, Maryland	Camp Meeting Ground Road, 1 mile east of MD 276; 39°37′34″N 76°03′41″W	
Smith's Falls		Port Deposit, Maryland	MD 222, north of MD 269; 39°37′02.71″N 76°07′57.19″W	
Snow's Battery		Port Deposit, Maryland	MD 222 (southbound), south of MD 276; 39°36′15″N 76°06′53″W	
St. Augustine's Church		St. Augustine, Maryland	MD 310 (eastbound) at MD 342; 39°29′40″N 75°48′32″W	
St. Francis Xavier Church "Old Bohemia"		Warwick, Maryland	MD 282 (westbound) at Church Road; 39°25′01″N 75°46′42″W	
St. Francis Xavier Church "Old Bohemia"		Cecilton, Maryland	MD 213 (southbound) at Bohemia Church Road; 39°25′59″N 75°51′40″W	
St. Mary Anne's Church-North Elk Parish-1706		North East, Maryland	MD 272, between Church and Thomas Street; 39°35′47″N 75°56′31″W	
Susquehanna Manor		Perryville, Maryland	MD 7 (westbound), 1 mile east of Perryville; 39°34′02.13″N 76°03′21.63″W	
The Anchorage		Cecilton, Maryland	MD 213 (southbound), 1.3 miles north of MD 282; 39°25′23″N 75°51′39″W	
The Hermitage		Elkton, Maryland	323 Hermitage Drive; 39°36′43″N 75°49′16″W	
The Nottingham Lots		Rising Sun, Maryland	MD 273 (eastbound), west of Sylmar Road; 39°42′08″N 76°02′17″W	
The Principio Company		Principio Furnace, Maryland	MD 7 (south side) at 1760 Principio Furnace Road; 39°34′37.5″N 76°02′00.36″W	
The Proprietors of the Susquehanna Canal		Conowingo, Maryland	MD 222 (southbound), 3 miles south of US 1; 39°38′49″N 76°09′07″W	
West Nottingham Academy		West Nottingham, Maryland	Firetower Road at Harrisville Road, west of MD 276; 39°40′11.31″N 76°04′36.11″W	
West Nottingham Academy		West Nottingham, Maryland	MD 276 (northbound) at Firetower/Cowan Road; 39°40′12.87″N 76°04′26.83″W	
West Nottingham Academy		Rising Sun, Maryland	US 1 at MD 276, northeast corner 39°42′11.12″N 76°04′56.26″W	
Wilna		Childs, Maryland	MD 545 (Blue Ball Road) east side, under I-95 overpass 39°38′31″N 75°52′00″W	
Woodlawn		Earleville, Maryland	Grove Neck Road, 0.1 mile east of Pond Neck Road; 39°24′29″N 75°56′08″W	
Worsell Mannor		Cecilton, Maryland	MD 282 (eastbound) at Worsell Manor Road; 39°24′26″N 75°49′43″W	
