= List of Maryland state historical markers in Saint Mary's County =

This is a list of the Maryland state historical markers in Saint Mary's County.

This is intended to be a complete list of the official state historical markers placed in Saint Mary's County, Maryland by the Maryland Historical Trust (MHT). The locations of the historical markers, as well as the latitude and longitude coordinates as provided by the MHT's database, are included below. There are currently 20 historical markers located in Saint Mary's County.

Marker title	Image	City	Location	Topics
British Landing Prevented		St. George Island, Maryland	MD 249 (Piney Point Road) west side, 0.1 mile south of St. George Island Bridge; 38°08′05.18″N 76°29′49.50″W	
Cecil's Mill Historic District		Great Mills, Maryland	MD 471 (Indian Bridge Road) east side, 0.2 miles north of MD 5 (Point Lookout Road); 38°14′25.35″N 76°30′12.02″W	
Chaptico		Chaptico, Maryland	MD 234 (Budds Creek Road) south side, 100 ft. west of MD 238 (Maddox Road); 38°22′06.46″N 76°46′57.11″W	
Charlotte Hall School		Charlotte Hall, Maryland	MD 5 (Three Notch Road) west side, at Charlotte Hall School Road; 38°28′43.08″N 76°46′32.55″W	
Coole Springs of Saint Marie's Charlotte Hall, Maryland		Charlotte Hall, Maryland	Charlotte Hall Road (east side), 150 ft. south of Charlotte School Road; 38°28′40.70″N 76°46′39.86″W	
De La Brook Manor		Oraville, Maryland	MD 6 (New Market Turner Road) at Delabrooke Road, northeast corner 38°26′04.22″N 76°40′59.19″W	
Deep Falls		Clements, Maryland	MD 234 (Budds Creek Road) south side, 2.7 miles west of MD 242 (Colton Point Road); 38°21′19.62″N 76°45′38.21″W	
Fenwick Manor		Hillville, Maryland	Jones Wharf Road (north side), 300 ft. east of MD 235 (Three Notch Road); 38°22′01.85″N 76°35′24.53″W	
Leonardtown		Leonardtown, Maryland	Washington Street at MD 5 Bus. (Fenwick Street); 38°17′27.98″N 76°38′09.10″W	
Manor of Cornwaleys' Cross		St. Inigoes, Maryland	MD 5 (Point Lookout Road) west side, at Loblolly Lane, 0.3 mile south of Villa Road; 38°09′26.80″N 76°23′46.96″W	
Margaret Brent Pilgrimage		Lexington Park, Maryland	MD 5 (Point Lookout Road) in front of St. Mary's City post office 38°11′17″N 76°25′57″W	
Mattapany		Paxtuxent River NAS, Maryland	Millstone Road (northeast side) at Mattapany Road, 0.4 miles north of Cedar Point Road; 38°17′05.64″N 76°26′13.15″W	
Mattapany Street		St. Mary's City, Maryland	MD 5 (Point Lookout Road) west side, at Mattapany Road; 38°10′59.98″N 76°25′36.42″W	
Point Lookout Prisoner-of-War Camp		Point Lookout, Maryland	MD 5 (Point Lookout Road) east side, 0.62 mile south of Lake Conoy; 38°02′57.13″N 76°19′23.63″W	
Saint Clement's Island		Colton's Point, Maryland	Point Breeze Road (north side), 500 ft. east of MD 242 (Colton Point Road); 38°13′28.91″N 76°45′02.22″W	
Saint Nicholas Church		Lexington Park, Maryland	MD 235, approx. 2 miles south of Great Mills Road; 38°15′47.70″N 76°26′46.15″W	
St. Joseph's Manor		California, Maryland	Town Creek Drive (south side), 130 ft. north of Harbor Lane, 1.6 miles east of MD 235; 38°18′51.57″N 76°29′04.62″W	
St. Mary's City - Capital of Maryland		St. Mary's City, Maryland	MD 5 (Point Lookout Road) west side, 175 ft. north of Trinity Church Road (south end); 38°11′09.75″N 76°25′54.88″W	
St. Mary's Female Seminary		St. Mary's City, Maryland	Trinity Church Road (north side of north end), 150 ft. west of MD 5; 38°11′19.28″N 76°25′57.88″W	
Three Notch Road		Oraville, Maryland	MD 235 (Three Notch Road), 200 ft. north of Mt. Zion Church Road; 38°24′42.10″N 76°40′47.02″W	
