= List of Maryland state historical markers in Frederick County =

This is a list of the Maryland state historical markers in Frederick County.

This is intended to be a complete list of the official state historical markers placed in Frederick County, Maryland by the Maryland Historical Trust (MHT). The locations of the historical markers, as well as the latitude and longitude coordinates as provided by the MHT's database, are included below. There are currently 24 historical markers located in Frederick County.

Marker title	Image	City	Location	Topics
Abraham Lakin 2nd		Jefferson, Maryland	Fry Road (east side), 1.25 miles north of MD 464; 39°19′37.4″N 77°32′33.9″W	
Amelung Glass Works		Urbana, Maryland	MD 355 at Parks Mill Rd. 39°20′07″N 77°22′54″W	
Carroll's Mill		Adamstown, Maryland	Pleasant View Road at Doubs Road; 39°18′09″N 77°29′14″W	
Carrollton		Buckeystown, Maryland	MD 85 (northbound), 100 ft. south of Manor Woods Road; 39°19′55.8″N 77°25′56.2″W	
Catoctin Furnace		Catoctin Furnace, Maryland	MD 806 (southbound), 0.5 miles north of Blacks Mill Road; 39°34′52.2″N 77°26′02″W	
Emmitsburg Longrifles		Emmitsburg, Maryland	US 15 at Maryland Welcome Center; 39°42′29.22″N 77°18′50.4″W	
Forest of Needwood		Knoxville, Maryland	MD 17 (west) at Lee's Lane; 39°22′01.3″N 77°38′12.2″W	
Frederick County		Knoxville, Maryland	MD 340 (south side), northwest of Knoxville; 39°19′48.87″N 77°40′11.98″W	
General Edward Braddock		Frederick, Maryland	MD 40 Alt. (Old National Pike), 0.1 mile east of Mt. Phillip Road; 39°25′11.0″N 77°27′50.4″W	
George Washington		Frederick, Maryland	US 15 (northbound), 65 ft. south of Willow Road, north of Frederick; 39°28′06.5″N 77°24′05.2″W	
George Washington (Cookerly's Tavern)		New Midway, Maryland	MD 194 (west side), 200 ft. south of the railroad tracks 39°33′50″N 77°17′46″W	
George Washington (Peter's Tavern)		Urbana, Maryland	MD 355 (southbound) at Bennett Run Creek; 39°19′06″N 77°20′04″W	
George Washington (The Dutchman's)		Tuscarora, Maryland	MD 28 (eastbound), 0.3 miles west of MD 85; 39°15′27.2″N 77°28′02.4″W	
George Washington Traveled This Road		Frederick, Maryland	1501 North Market Street; 39°26′06″N 77°24′13″W	
Headquarters of Generals Robert E. Lee, "Stonewall" Jackson and Longstreet		Frederick, Maryland	MD 355 (west side), 0.6 miles north of Monocacy River; 39°22′35.3″N 77°23′49.9″W	
Interstate and Defense Highways		Emmitsburg, Maryland	US 15 Business (South Seton Avenue) east side at Toms Creek; 39°41′29.10″N 77°19′56.66″W	
John Collins		Boonsboro, Maryland	US 40 Alt. (westbound) at Frederick/ Washington counties line 39°29′04.88″N 77°37′11.69″W	
Lewistown Trout Hatchery & Bass Ponds		Lewistown, Maryland	Fish Hatchery Road at Bethel Road, just west of US 15; 39°32′08.82″N 77°25′55.75″W	
Maj. Gen. Edward Braddock		Frederick, Maryland	US 40 (westbound) at Baughmans Lane (on Police Barracks); 39°25′01″N 77°26′21″W	
Middletown in the Civil War		Middletown, Maryland	US 40 Alt. at Elm Street, southeast corner, in park 39°26′37.93″N 77°32′51.64″W	
Reno Monument		Middletown, Maryland	US 40 at Bolivar Road, southwest corner 39°27′59″N 77°35′31″W	
Site of St. Joseph's College		Emmitsburg, Maryland	South Seton Avenue (east side), 0.4 miles north of US 15; 39°41′46.9″N 77°19′49.2″W	
St. Elizabeth Ann Seton		Emmitsburg, Maryland	South Seton Avenue (east side), 0.4 miles north of US 15; 39°41′48″N 77°19′48.9″W	
Washington County		Knoxville, Maryland	MD 340 (south side), northwest of Knoxville; 39°19′48.87″N 77°40′11.98″W	
