= List of Maryland state historical markers in Somerset County =

This is a list of the Maryland state historical markers in Somerset County.

This is intended to be a complete list of the official state historical markers placed in Somerset County, Maryland by the Maryland Historical Trust (MHT). The locations of the historical markers, as well as the latitude and longitude coordinates as provided by the MHT's database, are included below. There are currently 26 historical markers located in Somerset County.

Marker title	Image	City	Location	Topics
Acadians in Maryland		Princess Anne, Maryland	MD 363 (Manokin Ave) at Mansion St. 38°12′15.42″N 75°41′47.29″W	
Bloomsbury		Venton, Maryland	MD 363 (Deal Island Road) at Drawbridge Road; 38°11′13.88″N 75°47′08.94″W	
Church of God		Princess Anne, Maryland	Meadow Bridge Road (southeast), 0.2 miles northeast of West Post Office Road; 38°13′19.05″N 75°34′59.62″W	
Col. George Gale		Princess Anne, Maryland	MD 362 (Mt. Vernon Road) south side 100 ft. west of Black Road; 38°13′08.65″N 75°44′51.02″W	
Court House Hill		Pocomoke City, Maryland	Court House Hill Road at MD 364 (Dividing Creek Road); 38°06′01.93″N 75°33′10.08″W	
Crisfield		Crisfield, Maryland	MD 413 at 9th St. 37°58′45.91″N 75°51′37.52″W	
First Site of Washington Academy		Westover, Maryland	Sign Post Road (east side) at Keenan Lane; 38°08′05.29″N 75°42′44.28″W	
Gen. Arnold Elzey C.S.A.		Oriole, Maryland	MD 627 (Oriole Road) south side at Locust Point Road; 38°10′21.26″N 75°47′50.58″W	
Henry's Beach		Dames Quarter, Maryland	MD 363 (Deal Island Road) north side, 0.2 mile west of Hodson White Road; 38°11′18.7″N 75°53′55.7″W	
Historic Boxwood Gardens Princess Anne		Princess Anne, Maryland	MD 675 (Somerset Avenue) at Washington Street, southeast corner 38°12′09.55″N 75°41′33.90″W	
J. Millard Tawes		Crisfield, Maryland	216 MD 413; 37°59′01.20″N 75°51′15.72″W	
Joshua Thomas		Deal Island, Maryland	MD 363 (Deal Island Road), west side at Southside Estates Road; 38°09′17.95″N 75°56′55.05″W	
Make Peace		Lawsonia, Maryland	MD 380 (Lawsonia Road) at Boone Road; 37°58′21.97″N 75°49′54.79″W	
Manokin Presbyterian Church		Princess Anne, Maryland	Fluers Lane at MD 675 (Somerset Avenue); 38°12′26.58″N 75°41′40.89″W	
Oaksville Ball Park		Oaksville, Maryland	Perryhawkin Rd at Sam Bowland Rd; 38°11′18.1″N 75°37′39.0″W	
Princess Anne Town		Princess Anne, Maryland	1840 Somerset Ave; 38°12′22.9788″N 75°41′39.5628″W	
Rehoboth		Pocomoke City, Maryland	US 13 (Ocean Highway) at MD 667 (Rehobeth Road), northeast corner 38°05′14.59″N 75°36′25.90″W	
Rehoboth Presbyterian Church		Rehobeth, Maryland	MD 667 (Rehobeth Road) north side at Coventry Parish Road; 38°02′43.83″N 75°40′06.22″W	
Saint Stephen's Church Coventry Parish		Upper Fairmount, Maryland	MD 361 (Fairmount Road) north side, 900 ft. west of Upper Hill Road; 38°06′20.73″N 75°47′36.06″W	
Samuel Chase		Princess Anne, Maryland	West side of Reading Ferry Road, .25 mi. north of Larry Lankford Rd. 38°15′56.28″N 75°45′11.22″W	
Smith Island		Ewell, Maryland	Caleb Jones Road near Ewell United Methodist Church; 37°59′42.10″N 76°01′56.46″W	
Somerset County		Princess Anne, Maryland	11916 Somerset Avenue; 38°12′31.7″N 75°41′41.6″W	
Somerset County Circuit Courthouse		Princess Anne, Maryland	MD 675 (North Somerset Avenue) at Prince William Street; 38°12′15.3″N 75°41′37.2″W	
St. Andrew's Episcopal Church		Princess Anne, Maryland	Beckford Avenue (east side), between Prince William Street and Washington Street; 38°12′09.82″N 75°41′40.76″W	
University of Maryland Eastern Shore		Princess Anne, Maryland	MD 822 southbound, just north of College Backbone Road; 38°12′49.428″N 75°41′11.58″W	
Ye Old St. Peters Methodist Church		Crisfield, Maryland	St. Peter's Church Road at Thomas Long Road; 38°01′01.46″N 75°49′11.48″W	
