= List of Maryland state historical markers in Baltimore City =

This is a list of the Maryland state historical markers in Baltimore City.

This is intended to be a complete list of the official state historical markers placed in Baltimore City, Maryland by the Maryland Historical Trust (MHT). The locations of the historical markers, as well as the latitude and longitude coordinates as provided by the MHT's database, are included below. There are currently 28 historical markers located in Baltimore City.

Marker title	Image	City	Location	Topics
Baltimore Slave Trade		Baltimore	Front of Reginald F. Lewis Museum of Maryland African American History and Culture; 39°17′14.0″N 76°36′13.1″W	
Bon Secours Hospital		Baltimore	2000 West Baltimore Street, northwest corner 39°17′18″N 76°38′59″W	
Camp Holabird		Dundalk, Maryland	Holabird Avenue and Dundalk Avenue; 39°16′20.70″N 76°31′53.25″W	
Clover Hill		Baltimore	Charles Street (northbound), 200 ft. north of University Parkway; 39°20′01″N 76°37′04″W	
Davidge Hall		Baltimore	Lombard Street (north side), 100 ft. east of Green Street; 39°17′15.09″N 76°37′23.6″W	
Evergreen on the Falls		Baltimore	MD 25 (west side), 100 ft. north of I-83, south ramp 39°19′40″N 76°38′03″W	
Federal Hill		Baltimore	Federal Hill Park (north side) at Henry Street; 39°16′46″N 76°36′30″W	
Fells Point		Baltimore	Thames Street (NE corner) at foot of Broadway Street; 39°16′56″N 76°35′35″W	
First Boy Scout Armory		Baltimore	Cross country Boulevard / Kelly Avenue at Bonnie View Road, northeast corner 39°22′00″N 76°39′51″W	
First Dental College		Baltimore	Baltimore Street (north side), 200 ft. east of Pine Street; 39°17′21″N 76°37′33″W	
Fort Look-Out		Baltimore	E. Randall St. at Riverside Ave. 39°16′18.1″N 76°36′29.8″W	
Furley Hall		Baltimore	Parkside Drive at Brehms Lane; 39°19′25.75″N 76°33′40″W	
George Herman (Babe) Ruth		Baltimore	Russell St./Eislen St. and Camden St. 39°17′06″N 76°37′22″W	
Great Railroad Strike of 1877		Baltimore	S Howard St at Camden Station; 39°17′06.04″N 76°37′09.98″W	
Historic Canton		Baltimore	O'Donnell Square, east end, at Potomac and O'Donnell Streets; 39°16′49″N 76°34′26″W	
Homewood		Baltimore	Charles Street (west side) at 34th Street, in median 39°19′46.03″N 76°37′04.87″W	
Keswick		Baltimore	W. 40th Street (north side), 0.1 mile west of Keswick Road; 39°20′16″N 76°37′46″W	
Locust Point		Baltimore, Maryland	Fort Avenue (south side), 100 ft. west of Towson Street, in Latrobe Park; 39°16′06.573″N 76°35′33.557″W	
Montebello		Baltimore	Gate House, Lake Montebello, Whitman Dr. 39°19′55″N 76°35′14″W	
Mount Auburn Cemetery		Baltimore	Waterview Avenue (south side), 200 ft. east of MD 648; 39°15′39″N 76°38′13″W	
Mt. Olivet Cemetery		Baltimore	Frederick Avenue (westbound), 200 ft. west of Fort Hill Avenue; 39°16′49″N 76°39′50″W	
Rectory of Old St. Paul's Parish		Baltimore	Cathedral Street at Saratoga Street, northeast corner 39°17′35″N 76°37′01″W	
Roland Park		Baltimore	Roland Avenue (west side), 100 ft. north of Upland Road; 39°21′01″N 76°38′07″W	
Site of Poe's Death		Baltimore	N. Broadway Street (west side), 200 ft. north of Fairmount Avenue; 39°17′34.98″N 76°35′39.12″W	
Taylor's Chapel		Baltimore	Hillen Road (east side), 0.3 miles south of Northern Parkway; 39°21′51″N 76°34′38″W	
The Canton Library		Baltimore	Ellwood Avenue (west side) at O'Donnell Street; 39°16′49″N 76°34′21″W	
The General's Highway		Baltimore	Broadway, .04 miles south of Monument Street; 39°17′52.076″N 76°35′37.917″W	
Wrestling in Maryland		Baltimore	MTA Station at Camden Yards, I-395 and West Conway Street; 39°17′02.32″N 76°37′11.50″W	
