= List of Maryland state historical markers in Anne Arundel County =

This is a list of the Maryland state historical markers in Anne Arundel County.

This is intended to be a complete list of the official state historical markers placed in Anne Arundel County, Maryland by the Maryland Historical Trust (MHT). The locations of the historical markers, as well as the latitude and longitude coordinates as provided by the MHT's database, are included below. There are currently 48 historical markers located in Anne Arundel County.

Marker title	Image	City	Location	Topics
All Hallows Church		Birdsville, Maryland	MD 2 (Solomon's Island Road) west side, at Brick Church Road; 38°54′37.4″N 76°34′49.4″W	
Annapolis Water Company		Annapolis, Maryland	Waterworks Park, one mile west of westbound MD 450 west of MD 178; 38°59′13.35″N 76°34′01.15″W	
Anne Arundel Academy		Millersville, Maryland	Millersville Road (southbound), 0.9 miles east of MD 3; 39°03′20.28″N 76°38′17.62″W	
Battle of the Severn		Annapolis, Maryland	Southbound MD450 at Ritchie Overlook; 38°59′55.9″N 76°28′54.7″W	
Belvoir		Crownsville, Maryland	MD 178, 1.0 miles south of Crownsville Road; 39°01′07.86″N 76°35′01.41″W	
Benson-Hammond House and B&A Short Line		Linthicum Heights, Maryland	MD 170 (southbound), south of Twin Oak Road; 39°12′25″N 76°39′09″W	
Birthplace of Johns Hopkins		Crofton, Maryland	Riedel Road and Johns Hopkins Road (SE corner), 0.7 miles east of MD 3; 39°01′25.7″N 76°40′27.6″W	
Butler in Annapolis		Annapolis, Maryland	MD 255 (north). 200' east of MD 468; 38°58′58.14″N 76°28′51.48″W	
Camp Parole		Annapolis, Maryland	MD 2 (Solomons Island Road) east side, 0.1 mile north of Forest Drive; 38°58′48.2″N 76°32′15.9″W	
Cedar Park and Tulip Hill		Galesville, Maryland	MD 255 (westbound) at MD 468; 38°50′57″N 76°33′23″W	
Count De Rochambeau's Troops		Crownsville, Maryland	MD 178 (southbound), 200 ft. east of Waterbury Road; 39°02′55″N 76°36′53″W	
Curtis Creek Furnace		Glen Burnie, Maryland	MD 2 (northbound), 0.1 mile north of Furnace Branch Road; 39°11′01″N 76°36′45″W	
Epiphany Episcopal Chapel and Church House		Odenton, Maryland	Morgan Road at Odenton Road; 39°05′13.8″N 76°42′31.2″W	
Freetown		Lipins Corner, Maryland	MD 177 (Mountain Road) east of Freetown Road; 39°07′59.340″N 76°34′39.840″W	
Governor William Stone		Millersville, Maryland	Governor Stone Parkway, north of Benfield Boulevard; 39°05′34″N 76°36′50″W	
Hammond-Harwood House		Annapolis, Maryland	MD 450 at MD 435; 38°59′18.00″N 76°29′52.00″W	
Harmans		Harmans, Maryland	713 Dorsey Rd. (MD 176) just N of MD; 39°09′42.26″N 76°43′01.55″W	
Historic Annapolis		Annapolis, Maryland	MD 2 (southbound), 0.2 miles north of College Parkway; 39°03′16″N 76°31′31″W	
Hockley-In-The-Hole		Annapolis, Maryland	MD 450 (Defense Highway) north side, 1500 feet west of Housley Road; 38°59′12.0″N 76°33′45.0″W	
Holly Hill		Friendship, Maryland	MD 261 (westbound), east of Fairhaven Road; 38°43′41″N 76°34′06″W	
Lafayette's Encampment		Annapolis, Maryland	6th Street (west side) at southern end of bridge over Spa Creek; 38°58′17.7″N 76°29′07.4″W	
Larkin's Hills		Harwood, Maryland	MD 2 (Solomon's Island Road) northbound, 1/2 mile south of Mill Swamp Road; 38°53′10.09″N 76°36′00.72″W	
Linthicum Heights		Linthicum Heights, Maryland	MD 170 and Maple Rd. 39°12′19.26″N 76°39′10.95″W	
Magothy Methodist Church		Jacobsville, Maryland	MD 177 (eastbound), 0.25 miles west of MD 607; 39°07′25.20″N 76°31′32.82″W	
Marley Chapel		Glen Burnie, Maryland	MD 270 at MD 648, 50 feet past McGivney Way; 39°09′21.66″N 76°36′01.74″W	
Maryland State House		Annapolis, Maryland	On State House Grounds, near State Circle, opposite Maryland Avenue; 38°58′45.60″N 76°29′25.34″W	
Maryland State House		Annapolis, Maryland	On State House grounds, near State Circle, between Bladen and North Streets; 38°58′45.00″N 76°29′28.37″W	
Maryland State House		Annapolis, Maryland	On State House grounds, near State Circle, opposite Francis Street; 38°58′42.30″N 76°29′25.46″W	
Maryland State House		Annapolis, Maryland	On State House grounds, near State Circle, opposite School Street; 38°58′42.90″N 76°29′28.65″W	
Middle Plantation		Davidsonville, Maryland	MD 424 (northbound), 0.3 miles north of Rossback Road; 38°57′53″N 76°39′41″W	
Old Quaker Burying Ground		Galesville, Maryland	MD 468 at MD 255, northeast corner 38°51′00″N 76°33′26″W	
Portland Manor		Bristol, Maryland	MD 4 (Southern Maryland Boulevard) at MD 25; 38°47′33.07″N 76°40′06.34″W	
Pumphrey Elementary School		Pumphrey, Maryland	5929 Belle Grove Rd. (MD 170); 39°13′6.36″N 76°38′22.80″W	
Rawling's Tavern		Harwood, Maryland	MD 2 (Solomons Island Road) east side, at Harwood Road; 38°51′55.7″N 76°37′10.9″W	
Saint James' Church		Lothian, Maryland	MD 2 (northbound), 0.3 miles north of MD 258; 38°47′22″N 76°35′55″W	
Severn Crossroads Church		Severn Crossroads, Maryland	MD 178 (General's Highway) at Millersville Road, northwest corner 39°03′36″N 76°37′39″W	
Shipley's Choice		Millersville, Maryland	Veteran's Highway (east side), 1 mile south of Benfield Boulevard; 39°04′44.3″N 76°37′37.5″W	
Shipley's Choice		Millersville, Maryland	Benfield Boulevard (south side), 0.14 miles west of Scarlett Oak Drive; 39°05′34.85″N 76°37′00.64″W	
Shipley's Choice		Millersville, Maryland	Veterans Highway (west side), 0.8 miles south of Benfield Boulevard; 39°04′53.7″N 76°37′34.8″W	
The General's Highway		Annapolis, Maryland	MD 178 (Generals Highway) at MD 450 (Defense Highway); 38°59′10.20″N 76°32′51.59″W	
The Old South River Club		Harwood, Maryland	South River Clubhouse Road (south side), 1 mile east of MD 2; 38°54′21.5″N 76°33′49.9″W	
Washington, Baltimore and Annapolis Electric Railroad		Severn, Maryland	WB+A Rd at MD 174 (Donaldson Rd.); 39°08′05.9″N 76°40′21.2″W	
Watkins Slave Cemetery		Davidsonville, Maryland	MD 424 (Davidsonville Road), 0.4 mile south of US 50/301; 38°57′25.9″N 76°38′55.4″W	
Wesley Grove Methodist Church		Harmons, Maryland	Dorsey Road (westbound), 0.7 mile west of MD 170; 39°09′30.90″N 76°42′28.38″W	
Widow Ramsey's Tavern		Millersville, Maryland	MD 3 at Dicus Mill Road (northbound); 39°04′44″N 76°37′38″W	
William Penn		Galesville, Maryland	MD 255 (Owensville Road) eastbound, 0.8 miles east of MD 468; 38°50′35″N 76°32′27″W	
William Penn		Mt. Zion, Maryland	MD 255 (Owensville Road) south side, 1.5 miles east of MD 2; 38°51′24.2″N 76°35′08.6″W	
William Penn		Harwood, Maryland	MD 2 (Solomons Island Road) east side, 0.1 miles south of Mill Swamp Road; 38°53′15.6″N 76°35′57.5″W	
