= List of Maryland state historical markers in Wicomico County =

This is a list of the Maryland state historical markers in Wicomico County.

This is intended to be a complete list of the official state historical markers placed in Wicomico County, Maryland by the Maryland Historical Trust (MHT). The locations of the historical markers, as well as the latitude and longitude coordinates as provided by the MHT's database, are included below. There are currently 15 historical markers located in Wicomico County.

Marker title	Image	City	Location	Topics
Fruitland		Fruitland, Maryland	N. Division St at E Main St. 38°19′03.24″N 75°36′58.56″W	
General John Henry Winder C.S.A.		Salisbury, Maryland	Main Street at South Division Street, northeast corner 38°21′56.14″N 75°36′01.18″W	
Green Hill Town and Port		Salisbury, Maryland	Nanticoke Rd (MD 349) and West Main St; northeast corner 38°22′9.696″N 75°36′52.812″W	
Holloway Hall		Salisbury, Maryland	1101 Camden Ave., in front of Holloway Hall, Salisbury University Campus; 38°20′53.3″N 75°36′28.3″W	
Johnson School House Game Refuge		Salisbury, Maryland	Mt. Olive Road (northeast side), 0.2 miles northwest of Layfield Road; 38°18′14.31″N 75°29′58.96″W	
Newtown Historic District		Salisbury, Maryland	North Division Street (east side), between Broad and Chestnut Streets; 38°22′04.57″N 75°36′00.49″W	
Newtown Historic District		Salisbury, Maryland	North Division Street at Oakdale Road, southwest corner 38°22′19.76″N 75°35′50.71″W	
Old Spring Hill St. Paul's Church		Hebron, Maryland	US 50 (Ocean Highway) at MD 347 (North Main Street); 38°25′47.74″N 75°40′24.91″W	
Pemberton Hall		Salisbury, Maryland	Pemberton Drive (north side), 500 ft. east of Crooked Oak Lane; 38°21′10.37″N 75°38′50.15″W	
Poplar Hill Mansion		Salisbury, Maryland	Elizabeth Street at Poplar Hill Avenue, northeast corner 38°22′16.91″N 75°35′43.98″W	
Rockawalkin School		Salisbury, Maryland	Pemberton Drive at Ellegood Street, southeast corner 38°21′52.25″N 75°37′17.70″W	
San Domingo School		Sharptown, Maryland	MD 313 (Sharptown Rd) at Cooper Mill Rd; 38°30′47.44″N 75°44′38.77″W	
Transpeninsular Line Between Maryland and Three Lower Counties of Penn.		Delmar, Maryland	US 13 (Ocean Highway) at MD 54 (State Street), southwest corner 38°27′19.62″N 75°33′30.75″W	
Whitehaven		Whitehaven, Maryland	MD 358 (Whitehaven Road) at Church Street, southwest corner 38°16′13.21″N 75°47′28.49″W	
Wicomico Presbyterian Church		Salisbury, Maryland	US 50 (Salisbury Parkway) north side at Baptist Street; 38°22′02.60″N 75°35′56.89″W	
