= List of Maryland state historical markers in Worcester County =

This is a list of the Maryland state historical markers in Worcester County.

This is intended to be a complete list of the official state historical markers placed in Worcester County, Maryland by the Maryland Historical Trust (MHT). The locations of the historical markers, as well as the latitude and longitude coordinates as provided by the MHT's database, are included below. There are currently 10 historical markers located in Worcester County.

Marker title	Image	City	Location	Topics
Askiminokonson Indian Town		Snow Hill, Maryland	MD 12 (Snow Hill Road) at MD 354 (Whiton Road), southeast corner 38°11′22.63″N 75°24′26.24″W	
Boundary Line Maryland-Virginia		Pocomoke City, Maryland	US 13 (Ocean Highway) east side, north of Virginia state line 38°00′17.51″N 75°32′37.20″W	
Commodore Stephen Decatur, USN		Berlin, Maryland	US 113 (Worcester Highway) northbound, at Tripoli Street, southeast corner 38°19′14.35″N 75°12′44.84″W	
Eastern End of Transpeninsular Line		Ocean City, Maryland	MD 528 (Coastal Highway) at 145th Street, in median 38°27′01.8″N 75°03′08.64″W	
Genesar		Berlin, Maryland	South Point Road, 2.4 miles south of MD 611 (Stephen Decatur Highway); 38°14′03.41″N 75°11′19.78″W	
Nassawango Iron Furnace		Snow Hill, Maryland	MD 12 (Snow Hill Road) at Old Furnace Road, northwest corner 38°12′38.75″N 75°27′03.77″W	
Ocean City		Ocean City, Maryland	Boardwalk at S. Division St. 38°19′38.51″N 75°05′12.99″W	
Snow Hill Town		Snow Hill, Maryland	W. Market St/MD 12 at Courthouse; 38°10′36.32″N 75°23′35.97″W	
St. Martin's Church		Berlin, Maryland	US 113 (Worcester Highway) west side, 0.1 mile north of MD 589 (Racetrack Road); 38°23′34.83″N 75°12′16.62″W	
Verrazano Bridge		Assateague, Maryland	MD 611 (Stephen Decatur Highway) south side, at west end of Verrazano Bridge; 38°14′50.47″N 75°09′07.70″W	
