= List of Maryland state historical markers in Kent County =

This is a list of the Maryland state historical markers in Kent County.

This is intended to be a complete list of the official state historical markers placed in Kent County, Maryland by the Maryland Historical Trust (MHT). The locations of the historical markers, as well as the latitude and longitude coordinates as provided by the MHT's database, are included below. There are currently 22 historical markers located in Kent County.

Marker title	Image	City	Location	Topics
Bass Propagation Lake		Fairlee, Maryland	Fish Hatchery Road (east side), 1 mile north of MD 298; 39°13′54.03″N 76°10′07.46″W	
Battle of Caulk's Field		Chestertown, Maryland	MD 20 (west side), 0.3 miles north of MD 21; 39°12′05.96″N 76°11′13.40″W	
Brig. Gen. John Cadwalader		Locust Grove, Maryland	MD 213 (south side) at Shrewsbury Church Road, 0.9 miles east of MD 298; 39°19′29.54″N 75°57′45.12″W	
Captain Lambert Wickes		Rock Hall, Maryland	MD 20 at MD 445, northeast corner 39°08′19.06″N 76°14′04.92″W	
Chestertown Maryland		Chestertown, Maryland	High Street at Cross Street, southeast corner 39°12′32.75″N 76°03′58.85″W	
Cliffs Schoolhouse		Pomona, Maryland	MD 289, five miles west of Pomona; 39°07′11.36″N 76°08′47.55″W	
Colonel Isaac Perkins		Chestertown, Maryland	MD 213 (north side), north of Big Woods Road, 1 mile west of MD 292; 39°16′43.65″N 76°01′33.03″W	
Crew's Landing		Betterton, Maryland	MD 292 (Main Street), at end in park 39°22′14.56″N 76°03′48.56″W	
Downs' Cross Roads		Galena, Maryland	MD 213 at MD 290, southwest corner 39°20′26.30″N 75°52′43.98″W	
George Vickers		Chestertown, Maryland	MD 289 (Cross St.) south of MD 213; 39°12′36.50″N 76°03′56.00″W	
Georgetown, Maryland		Georgetown, Maryland	MD 213 (west side) south of Queen Street; 39°29′48.36″N 75°52′48.80″W	
Gratitude		Rock Hall, Maryland	MD 20 east of Beach Road; 39°08′26.7″N 76°15′33.1″W	
Henry Highland Garnet		Chesterville, Maryland	MD 291, west of MD 290; 39°15′44″N 75°54′55″W	
Martin Wagner 1899-1980		Rock Hall, Maryland	MD 20 (west side), opposite Martin Wagner Road; 39°09′07.04″N 76°12′36.39″W	
Maryland's First Women Voters		Still Pond, Maryland	MD 292 (Still Pond Road) at MD 566 (Old Still Pond Road), southeast corner 39°19′38.32″N 76°02′40.87″W	
Mason-Dixon Line Crownstone		Peacock Corners, Maryland	MD 291 at state line 39°15′28.36″N 75°45′25.55″W	
Rock Hall Landing		Rock Hall, Maryland	S. Hawthorne Avenue at W. Sharp Street, northwest corner 39°08′01.76″N 76°14′34.62″W	
Rock Hall, Maryland		Rock Hall, Maryland	MD 445 (Main Street) at Sharp Street, southwest corner 39°08′11.52″N 76°14′05.84″W	
Tolchester Beach Amusement Park		Tolchester Beach, Maryland	MD 21 at 21108 Tolchester Beach Road; 39°12′52.37″N 76°14′26.72″W	
Washington College		Chestertown, Maryland	MD 213 (Washington Ave), 200 feet north of Campus Avenue; 39°12′58.09″N 76°04′00.24″W	
Wickliffe		Rock Hall, Maryland	MD 445 extended (Eastern Neck Road) west side, at Wickliffe Historic Site; 39°01′09.91″N 76°13′22.92″W	
Worrell's Tavern		Chestertown, Maryland	Queen Street at Cannon Street, southwest corner 39°12′26.14″N 76°03′57.41″W	
