= List of Maryland state historical markers in Harford County =

This is a list of the Maryland state historical markers in Harford County.

This is intended to be a complete list of the official state historical markers placed in Harford County, Maryland by the Maryland Historical Trust (MHT). The locations of the historical markers, as well as the latitude and longitude coordinates as provided by the MHT's database, are included below. There are currently 51 historical markers located in Harford County.

Marker title	Image	City	Location	Topics
Aberdeen Proving Ground		Aberdeen, Maryland	US 40 (median), west of MD 132; 39°30′26.40″N 76°09′53.68″W	
Bel Air - County Seat of Harford County		Bel Air, Maryland	Main Street at Office Street and Courtland Street; 39°32′07″N 76°20′58″W	
Berkley Crossroads		Darlington, Maryland	2398 Castleton Rod (MD 263) southbound, N of Berkley Rd. 39°39′42″N 76°12′33″W	
Black Horse Tavern		Blackhorse, Maryland	MD 23 (southbound) at MD 138; 39°37′29″N 76°33′02″W	
Calvary United Methodist Church		Churchville, Maryland	MD 136 (northbound), 1321 Calvary Road; 39°31′38.61″N 76°15′47.46″W	
Capt. Angus Greme		Churchville, Maryland	MD 136 (southbound) at Trappe Road; 39°37′01″N 76°15′30″W	
Captain John Smith		Abingdon, Maryland	US 40 (eastbound) west of Otter Point Road, in park overlooking Otter Point Creek; 39°26′59.43″N 76°16′43.55″W	
Churchville		Churchville, Maryland	MD 22 at MD 136, northeast corner 39°33′35″N 76°15′07″W	
Colony of Maryland		Aberdeen, Maryland	I-95, Maryland House Rest Stop; 39°29′49″N 76°13′56″W	
Concord Point Light Station		Havre de Grace, Maryland	Concord and Lafayette Streets; 39°32′27″N 76°05′06″W	
Conowingo		Conowingo, Maryland	US 1 (southbound), 0.25 mile south of dam 39°39′18″N 76°10′48″W	
Constant Friendship		Abingdon, Maryland	Northbound MD 928, N of Porter Dr. 39°28′13.4″N 76°18′34.3″W	
ENIAC		Aberdeen, Maryland	MD 22 between MD 7 and gate to Aberdeen Proving Ground; 39°30′23.22″N 76°09′12″W	
George Washington Traveled This Road		Havre de Grace, Maryland	St. John Street at Green Street; 39°32′58.15″N 76°05′22.79″W	
George Washington Traveled This Road		Havre de Grace, Maryland	Union Avenue at Franklin Street, southwest corner 39°33′02.60″N 76°05′30.62″W	
George Washington Traveled This Road		Havre de Grace, Maryland	Union Avenue at Revolution, north of northwest corner 39°32′37.27″N 76°05′29.75″W	
Hall's Cross Roads		Aberdeen, Maryland	MD 132 at E. Bel Air Avenue, southeast corner 39°30′27.36″N 76°09′35.01″W	
Harford Town or Bush		Bush, Maryland	MD 7 (westbound) at Bush Road, just west of bridge over Bynum Run; 39°28′17.42″N 76°16′02.06″W	
Harry Gilmor's Raid		Stockton, Maryland	MD 152 (southbound) at Old Joppa Road; 39°28′35″N 76°22′49″W	
Havre de Grace Racetrack		Havre de Grace, Maryland	MD 7 (Old Post Road/ Revolution Street) at Old Bay Lane; 39°32′12.87″N 76°06′43.93″W	
Havre de Grace War of 1812		Havre de Grace, Maryland	Lafayette Street at Concord Street (in park); 39°32′26″N 76°05′05″W	
Indian Spring		Churchville, Maryland	MD 136 (east side), 2.0 miles south of MD 1; 39°36′38″N 76°15′37″W	
Jerusalem Mills		Jerusalem, Maryland	Jerusalem Road at Little Gunpowder Bridge; 39°27′44″N 76°23′28″W	
Joppa Town		Joppatowne, Maryland	Bridge Drive and Anchor Drive; 39°24′23.1″N 76°21′47.82″W	
Ladew Topiary Gardens and Pleasant Valley House		Jarrettsville, Maryland	MD 146 (northbound), 0.8 mile south of MD 152, north of Pocock Road; 39°34′47.02″N 76°30′54.09″W	
LaFayette - at Col. Rigbie's House		Darlington vicinity, Maryland	MD 623 (Castleton Road), approximately 1500 feet south of Berkley Road; 39°39′28.5″N 76°12′23.9″W	
Medical Hall		Churchville, Maryland	Northwest corner of MD Route 22 and Thomas Run Road; 39°33′18.9072″N 76°17′11.99″W	
Old Post Road Established 1666 - Cokesbury College		Abingdon, Maryland	MD 7 (eastbound) at Cokesbury Road; 39°27′40.44″N 76°16′46.11″W	
Old Post Road Established 1666 - Count Rochambeau's		Havre de Grace, Maryland	Lewis Lane (northbound), north of MD 7; 39°32′33″N 76°06′07″W	
Old Post Road Established 1666 - Gov. William Paca		Edgewood, Maryland	MD 7 (northbound), north of MD 24; 39°26′58″N 76°17′47″W	
Old Post Road Established 1666 - Spesutia P.E. Church		Aberdeen, Maryland	MD 7 (Old Philadelphia Road) at MD 159 (Perryman Road); 39°29′16.99″N 76°11′27.76″W	
Old Post Road Established 1666 - Susquehanna Lower Ferry		Havre de Grace, Maryland	St. John Street at Warren Street; 39°33′06.18″N 76°05′29.58″W	
Olney		Joppa, Maryland	Old Joppa Road (eastbound), east of MD 152; 39°28′46″N 76°22′31″W	
Peach Bottom Slate Region		Whiteford, Maryland	on MD 165 north of MD 136; 39°42′48.94″N 76°20′51.56″W	
Prospect School		Havre de Grace, Maryland	MD 161 at Green Spring Rd. 39°35′51.1″N 76°11′28.8″W	
Rochambeau Plaza		Havre de Grace, Maryland	Washington Street at St. John Street and Green Street; 39°32′58.14″N 76°05′22.92″W	
Rock Run		Rock Run, Maryland	Rock Run Road, 100 yds west of Stafford Road, Rock Run State Park; 39°36′28.15″N 76°08′37.84″W	
Rock Run Landing		Havre de Grace, Maryland	Rock Run Road at Stafford Road; 39°36′30″N 76°08′35″W	
Saint Ignatius Church Hickory, Maryland		Bel Air, Maryland	US 1 Business, south of Jarrettsville Road; 39°34′24″N 76°21′15″W	
Site of "Old Baltimore"		, Maryland	Head of Bush River on US 40; 39°23′58.98″N 76°14′13.02″W	
Site of Old Baltimore		Abingdon, Maryland	US 40 (eastbound) in park overlooking Otter Point Creek, west of Otter Point Road; 39°26′59.44″N 76°16′43.30″W	
Sophia's Dairy		Belcamp, Maryland	US 40 (southbound), north of MD 543 (Riverside Pkway); 39°28′18.72″N 76°13′58.62″W	
Spesutia Church		Perryman, Maryland	MD 159 (southbound), south of Spesutia Road; 39°28′24″N 76°12′14″W	
Spesutia Island		Aberdeen, Maryland	Spesutia Road at Woodpecker Point (at small roadside park); 39°28′31.20″N 76°05′54.40″W	
State of Maryland		Aberdeen, Maryland	I-95, Maryland House Rest Stop; 39°29′50″N 76°13′54″W	
Susquehanna River Crossing		Havre de Grace, Maryland	MD 7/N. Union Ave., south of Otsego St., at David R. Craig Park; 39°33′09.35″N 76°05′30.02″W	
The Bush Declaration Harford Town		Bush, Maryland	MD 7 (westbound), east of Bush Road; 39°28′22″N 76°15′57″W	
The General's Highway		Aberdeen, Maryland	NE corner of US Rte 40 (Pulaski Hwy) and W. Belair Ave. 39°30′34.9338″N 76°09′48.8124″W	
The Hays House		Bel Air, Maryland	324 Kenmore Avenue; 39°31′57.20″N 76°20′49.48″W	
The Lock House		Havre de Grace, Maryland	Park Drive at Conesteo Street; 39°33′22.00″N 76°05′40.00″W	
Tudor Hall		Bel Air, Maryland	MD 22 (southbound) at Tudor Lane; 39°33′00″N 76°18′02″W	
