= List of Maryland state historical markers in Howard County =

This is a list of the Maryland state historical markers in Howard County.

This is intended to be a complete list of the official state historical markers placed in Howard County, Maryland by the Maryland Historical Trust (MHT). The locations of the historical markers, as well as the latitude and longitude coordinates as provided by the MHT's database, are included below. There are currently 19 historical markers located in Howard County.

| Marker title | Image | City | Location | Topics |
|---|---|---|---|---|
| Adam the First | | Columbia, Maryland | MD 108, .25 miles west of Snowdon River Pkwy; 39°12′51.23″N 76°48′11.64″W | |
| Annapolis and Elk Ridge Railroad | | Annapolis Junction, Maryland | Dorsey Run Rd., N of Brock Bridge Rd. 39°07′25.01″N 76°47′48.41″W | |
| Bollman Iron Truss Bridge | | Savage, Maryland | Foundry Street (west side), approximately 300 ft. north of Gorman Road; 39°08′04.64″N 76°49′30.35″W | |
| Christ Episcopal Church "Old Brick" | | Columbia, Maryland | Oakland Mills Road (southbound) at Dobbin Road; 39°11′04.401″N 76°49′38.632″W | |
| Cooksville | | Cooksville, Maryland | MD 97 (northbound), north of MD 144, at north end of Park and Ride Lot; 39°19′15.5″N 77°01′09.1″W | |
| Cooksville High School | | Cooksville, Maryland | MD 97 (east side), 0.3 miles north of Carr's Mill/McKendree Roads; 39°18′27.3″N 77°01′15.35″W | |
| Dr. Charles Alexander Warfield | | Cooksville, Maryland | MD 97 at Carrs Mill Road; 39°18′08″N 77°01′14″W | |
| Elk Ridge Landing | | Elkridge, Maryland | US 1 (southbound), just south of bridge crossing Patapsco River; 39°13′04″N 76°42′25″W | |
| Elk Ridge Landing | | Elkridge, Maryland | Old Washington Rd., south side, 100 feet east of US 1 (Washington Blvd.); 39°12′52.08″N 76°42′49.26″W | |
| Ellicott's Upper Mills | | Hollofield, Maryland | Old Frederick Road (north) 200 ft. west of bridge over Patapsco River; 39°18′37.65″N 76°47′37.73″W | |
| Friend's Meeting House and Graveyard | | Ellicott City, Maryland | Old Columbia Pike (east side), 1000 ft. south of Main Street; 39°16′01″N 76°47′57″W | |
| Spurrier's Tavern | | Waterloo/Jessup, Maryland | MD 175, eastbound, 125 feet west of US 1; 39°10′20.6″N 76°47′09.8″W | |
| Spurrier's Tavern 'Waterloo' | | Waterloo/Jessup, Maryland | US 1 North of MD 175; 39°10′22.8″N 76°46′54.6″W | |
| St. John's Episcopal Church | | Ellicott City, Maryland | MD 144 (Frederick Road) westbound, 0.1 mile west of St. John's Lane; 39°16′21.8″N 76°49′46.87″W | |
| The National Road | | Ellicott City, Maryland | MD 144 (westbound), 200 ft. east of Ellicott Mills Road; 39°16′05″N 76°48′04″W | |
| Trinity on the Pike (Episcopal) | | Waterloo, Maryland | US 1 (Washington Boulevard) southbound, between MD 175 and MD 176; 39°10′49″N 76°46′12″W | |
| Trinity White Oak Prayer of Dedication | | Waterloo, Maryland | US 1 (southbound), between MD 175 and MD 176; 39°10′49″N 76°46′12″W | |
| Waverly | | Mariottsville, Maryland | Warwick Way, north side, .1 mile east of Marriotsville Rd. 39°18′35.46″N 76°53′47.10″W | |
| Waverly | | Mariottsville, Maryland | Marriottsville Road (northbound), 600 ft. north of Marriottsville Road exit 39°18′35″N 76°53′54″W | |
