= List of Maryland state historical markers in Garrett County =

This is a list of the Maryland state historical markers in Garrett County.

This is intended to be a complete list of the official state historical markers placed in Garrett County, Maryland by the Maryland Historical Trust (MHT). The locations of the historical markers, as well as the latitude and longitude coordinates as provided by the MHT's database, are included below. There are currently 19 historical markers located in Garrett County.

| Marker title | Image | City | Location | Topics |
|---|---|---|---|---|
| Bear Camp | | Oakton, Maryland | US 40 Alt. (east side) at Hemlock Meadow Lane; 39°43′00.6″N 79°17′13.8″W | |
| Bear Creek Trout Hatchery and Rearing Station Garrett County | | Accident, Maryland | MD 219 (west side) at Bear Creek Road; 39°39′13.8″N 79°17′58.8″W | |
| Campsite | | Oakland, Maryland | Muddy Creek Falls (top) in Swallow Falls State Park; 39°30′05″N 79°25′01.2″W | |
| Castleman's River Bridge | | Grantsville, Maryland | US 40 Alt at Old Castleman River Bridge; 39°41′49.0″N 79°08′34.4″W | |
| Charles Friend's Home | | Oakland, Maryland | MD 39 (north side) east of Old Crellen Road; 39°23′43.8″N 79°26′01.2″W | |
| Civilian Conservation Corps | | Oakland, Maryland | along Maple Glade Road in Swallow Falls State Park; 39°29′57.40″N 79°25′7.06″W | |
| Cleveland Cottage | | Deer Park, Maryland | Hotel Road (north side), 0.5 miles south of Main Street; 39°25′12.63″N 79°19′50.66″W | |
| Cleveland Cottage and Site of Deer Park Hotel | | Deer Park, Maryland | MD 135 (south side), 200 ft. west of Deer Park Hotel Road; 39°25′24.6″N 79°20′18″W | |
| Col. James McHenry of Baltimore | | McHenry, Maryland | US 219 (west side) at scenic overlook, 1.1 miles north of Rock Lodge Road; 39°32′46.8″N 79°21′03.6″W | |
| Deep Creek Lake | | Thayersville, Maryland | US 219 (east side), opposite Mountain View Drive; 39°31′10.8″N 79°19′41.4″W | |
| Deer Park Hotel | | Deer Park, Maryland | Hotel Drive (west side), 100 ft. north of Haines Road; 39°25′05.4″N 79°19′49.8″W | |
| Friend's Graveyard | | Friendsville, Maryland | MD 42 (north side), 0.15 miles west of 1st Avenue; 39°39′43.8″N 79°24′45.6″W | |
| General Braddock's 5th Camp | | Grantsville, Maryland | US 40 Alt. (south side) west of Shade Hollow Road; 39°41′42.6″N 79°10′27″W | |
| Hoye-Crest | | Oakland, Maryland | US 219 (east side), 5.4 miles south of US 50 on top of Backbone mountain on a blazed trail 39°14′14.95″N 79°29′07.09″W | |
| Little Meadows | | Grantsville, Maryland | US 40 Alt., 0.35 miles east of US 219; 39°41′30″N 79°05′40.2″W | |
| Savage River Camp | | Frostburg, Maryland | US 40 Alt., east of Piney Run Road; 39°41′17.48″N 78°58′27.50″W | |
| Thayer Game Refuge | | McHenry, Maryland | US 219 (east side), 100 ft. south of Rockledge Road; 39°31′50.4″N 79°20′45″W | |
| The Grave of Meshack Browning | | Hoyes, Maryland | MD 42 (east side), 0.25 miles south of Hoyes-Sang Run Road; 39°35′13.2″N 79°22′11.4″W | |
| The Little Crossings | | Grantsville, Maryland | US 40 Alt. (north side) at Old Cassleman River Bridge; 39°41′47.4″N 79°08′40.5″W | |
