= List of Maryland state historical markers in Baltimore County =

This is a list of the Maryland state historical markers in Baltimore County.

This is intended to be a complete list of the official state historical markers placed in Baltimore County, Maryland by the Maryland Historical Trust (MHT). The locations of the historical markers, as well as the latitude and longitude coordinates as provided by the MHT's database, are included below. There are currently 77 historical markers located in Baltimore County.

Marker title	Image	City	Location	Topics
Baltimore and Susquehanna Railroad Marble Track Bed, MTA		Timonium, Maryland	Timonium Light Rail platform, north end, west side of tracks 39°26′56.024″N 76°38′06.99″W	
Baltimore County Courthouse		Towson, Maryland	Washington Ave., west side, between Chesapeake Ave. and Pennsylvania Ave. 39°24′00.8″N 76°36′20.1″W	
Baltimore County Courthouse		Towson, Maryland	Chesapeake Avenue (westbound), between Baltimore and Washington Avenue; 39°23′59.8″N 76°36′24.4″W	
Battle Acre		Dundalk, Maryland	MD 20 (southbound), east of Trappe Road; 39°16′40″N 76°29′04″W	
Benjamin Banneker		Catonsville, Maryland	Oella Avenue (west side), 0.4 miles north of MD 144; 39°16′11″N 76°46′29″W	
Brooklandwood Plantation		Brooklandville, Maryland	MD 25 (southbound), 0.5 miles north of MD 131; 39°25′58″N 76°40′35″W	
Buffalo Soldiers		Reisterstown, Maryland	MD 140 at Cockey's Mill Road, southwest corner 39°27′51″N 76°49′45″W	
Castle Thunder		Catonsville, Maryland	MD 144 (westbound), 100 ft. west of Beaumont Avenue; 39°16′13″N 76°44′22″W	
Catonsville Nine		Catonsville, Maryland	MD 144/Frederick Road, west of Beaumont Avenue; 39°16′13.2″N 76°44′22.8″W	
Civil Rights Milestone		Catonsville, Maryland	Near 106 Bloomsbury Avenue; 39°16′06.4524″N 76°43′49.2204″W	
Clynmalira		Glencoe, Maryland	Carroll Road (northbound), 0.1 mile north of Glencoe Road; 39°32′48″N 76°36′39″W	
Colonel William Norris		Reisterstown, Maryland	MD 140 at Cockey's Mill Road, northwest corner 39°27′52″N 76°49′47″W	
Commodore Joshua Barney		Dundalk, Maryland	Wise Avenue (north side), in front of Patapsco High School; 39°15′52.17″N 76°29′17.85″W	
Ellicott Mills		Ellicott Mills, Maryland	Oella Avenue (west side), 100 ft. north of MD 144; 39°16′04.72″N 76°47′36.80″W	
Emory Grove		Glyndon, Maryland	MD 128 at Waugh Avenue, northeast corner 39°28′37.6″N 76°48′49.1″W	
Epsom Chapel		Towson, Maryland	Virginia Ave. south of Joppa Road; 39°24′5.82″N 76°35′59.46″W	
Fork United Methodist Church		Fork, Maryland	12800 Fork Road; 39°28′22.0″N 76°26′50.8″W	
Fort Howard		Fort Howard, Maryland	End of MD 20 in Fort Howard Waterside Park, inside Fort Howard Medical Center; 39°11′57″N 76°26′50″W	
Francis Scott Key Memorial Bridge		Curtis Bay, Maryland	I-695 (inner loop), 0.1 mile past toll booth for bridge over Patapsco River; 39°13′49″N 76°30′42″W	
Franklin Academy		Reisterstown, Maryland	Cockeys Mill Road (westbound), west of MD 140; 39°27′50.64″N 76°49′47.40″W	
Garrison Forest Church		Owings Mills, Maryland	MD 140 (northbound) at St. Thomas Lane, northeast corner 39°24′50″N 76°46′19″W	
Gorsuch Tavern		Glencoe, Maryland	MD 45 (northbound), 300 ft. north of Upper Glencoe Road; 39°33′40.8″N 76°39′20.5″W	
Gunpowder Copper Works		Glen Arm, Maryland	MD 147 (east side), 0.3 miles north of Factory Road; 39°25′21.72″N 76°29′45.30″W	
Gunpowder Manor Long Green Valley		Baldwin, Maryland	MD 165 at Pleasantville Road, southeast corner 39°29′41″N 76°28′12″W	
Gunpowder River		Chase, Maryland	Gunpowder State Park, 1.2 miles northeast of Graces Quarters Road; 39°21′51.50″N 76°20′27.18″W	
Gwynnbrook State Farm No. 1		Owings Mills, Maryland	Gwynnbrook Avenue (north side), east of Owings Mills Boulevard; 39°26′37.7″N 76°46′52.4″W	
Hampton		Towson, Maryland	Hampton Lane (eastbound), 0.5 miles east of MD 146; 39°25′04″N 76°35′28″W	
Hannah More Academy		Reisterstown, Maryland	MD 140 (east), at Caraway Road, in front of school 39°27′03.35″N 76°49′07.75″W	
Hayfields		Hunt Valley, Maryland	Shawan Road (westbound), 50 ft. west of Western Run Road; 39°29′43″N 76°40′22″W	
Hoffman Paper Mills		Hoffmanville, Maryland	Gunpowder Road (northeast side), 150 ft. north of Hoffmanville; 39°41′09.8″N 76°46′37.0″W	
Home of Governor Bradford		Baltimore, Maryland	MD 139 (North Charles Street) southbound, 0.2 miles north of Gittings Avenue; 39°22′27″N 76°37′36″W	
Hunt's Church		Riderwood, Maryland	Joppa Road (eastbound), 200 ft. north of Old Court Road; 39°24′33″N 76°39′15″W	
Ishmael Day's House		Fork, Maryland	Sunshine Avenue (westbound), 0.9 miles east of MD 147; 39°27′45.6″N 76°25′35.6″W	
Logan Field		Dundalk, Maryland	Dundalk Avenue, 0.2 miles north of Dunhaven Road; 39°14′55.7″N 76°31′08.7″W	
Lutherville Historic District		Lutherville, Maryland	Front Avenue (west side), at Morris Avenue; 39°25′26″N 76°37′45″W	
Major Gen. Isaac Ridgeway Trimble, C.S.A.		Long Green, Maryland	Dulaney Valley Road (west side) at Ravenhurst Circle, 1.1 miles north of Loch Raven Drive; 39°28′44.1″N 76°32′07.6″W	
Mason and Dixon Line		MD-PA State Line	Maryland Line, Baltimore County, MD 45 at Pennsylvania Line; 39°43′16.0″N 76°39′27.7″W	
Mt. Paran Presbyterian Church & Cemetery		Randallstown, Maryland	MD 26 (Liberty Road) north side, 0.4 miles east of Lyons Mill Road; 39°23′29.33″N 76°50′09.25″W	
New Tavern		Wards Chapel, Maryland	MD 26 (westbound), east of Wards Chapel Road; 39°23′43″N 76°51′30″W	
Nicholas Ruxton Moore		Ruxton, Maryland	MD 134 (northbound), 100 ft. north of Malvern Avenue on hillside 39°23′47″N 76°38′41″W	
Nicholson's Manor		Glyndon, Maryland	MD 128 (Butler Road), north side, just north of Longnecker Road; 39°29′06.5″N 76°47′37.1″W	
North Point		Edgemere, Maryland	North Point Road (northbound), 0.25 miles south of Sparrows Point Road, in front of school 39°14′17″N 76°26′36″W	
North Point Battlefield		North Point, Maryland	MD 20, 0.2 miles south of MD 151; 39°16′24″N 76°28′10″W	
North Point Beachhead		Fort Howard, Maryland	North Point Road (west side), 100 ft. inside gate to Fort Howard Medical Center; 39°12′10″N 76°26′45″W	
Northampton Furnace		Timonium, Maryland	MD 146 (northbound) at Chapelwood Road; 39°26′28″N 76°35′49″W	
Perry Hall "The Adventure"		Perry Hall, Maryland	US 1 (northbound), 50 ft. south of Perry Hall Road; 39°25′14″N 76°27′15″W	
Quinn		Sweet Air, Maryland	MD 145 (eastbound), 0.1 mile east of Manor Road; 39°30′44.9″N 76°32′04.1″W	
Relay		Relay, Maryland	Arlington Avenue (west side), 200 ft. north of Cedar Avenue/Rolling Road; 39°13′35.731″N 76°42′21.701″W	
Rockland		Brooklandville, Maryland	Ruxton Road (north side), 50 ft. east of MD 25; 39°24′02″N 76°40′01″W	
Rolling Road		Catonsville, Maryland	MD 144 at MD 166, northeast corner 39°16′10″N 76°44′42″W	
Sater's Church		Brooklandville, Maryland	MD 25 at Saters Lane, northwest corner 39°26′11″N 76°40′56″W	
Scholar's Plains First Free School		White Marsh, Maryland	Allender Road (eastbound), 200 ft. north of B&O railroad bridge between MD 7 and US 40; 39°24′05″N 76°24′27″W	
Scott's Quarry		Butler, Maryland	Western Run Road at Tanyard Road, northeast corner 39°31′55.1″N 76°42′09.2″W	
Scott's Quarry		Butler, Maryland	Tanyard Road (east side), 0.65 mile north of Western Run Road; 39°32′27.7″N 76°41′52.8″W	
Soldiers Delight		Deer Park, Maryland	Deer Park Road (eastbound), 0.5 miles south of Wards Chapel Road; 39°24′53″N 76°50′09″W	
Sparrows Point		Edgemere, Maryland	Eastbound MD 158, west of MD 151; 39°14′35.00″N 76°27′20.90″W	
St. James's My Lady's Manor		Monkton, Maryland)	Monkton Road (westbound), 900 ft west of Old York Road; 39°33′37.49″N 76°34′07.69″W	
St. John the Evangelist Catholic Church (Baldwin, Maryland)		Baldwin, Maryland	Long Green Pike (northbound), 0.5 miles north of Hydes Road; 39°29′17″N 76°28′34″W	
St. John's Parish (Gunpowder)		Kingsville, Maryland	US 1, 100 ft. north of Bradshaw Road; 39°27′01″N 76°25′02″W	
St. Paul's Lutheran Church		Upperco, Maryland	Dover Road (westbound), 200 ft. east of MD 30, in parking lot 39°33′33.04″N 76°50′20.04″W	
Sudbrook Park		Pikesville, Maryland	Cliveden Road E. at Cliveden Road W., in triangular green 39°21′53.54″N 76°43′45.21″W	
The Baltimore and Harford Turnpike Company		Glen Arm, Maryland	on MD 147 near the intersection with Factory Road; 39°25′18.16″N 76°29′57.03″W	
The Colored Methodist Protestant St. John's Chapel		Ruxton, Maryland	MD 134 (Bellona Avenue) southbound, 0.1 mile south of Malvern Avenue; 39°23′42″N 76°38′38″W	
The Eagles Nest		Phoenix, Maryland	MD 146 (northbound), 0.5 miles north of Dulaney Valley Road; 39°28′18.00″N 76°34′34.26″W	
The Garrison Fort		Stevenson, Maryland	Garrison Farm Court (north side), 0.1 miles east of Garrison Farm Road; 39°23′56″N 76°42′30″W	
The Joppa Road		Towson, Maryland	Joppa Road, 100 ft. west of Edgeclift Road; 39°23′48″N 76°34′43″W	
The Old Court Road		Pikesville, Maryland	MD 140 (southbound), 0.2 miles east of Old Court Road; 39°22′37.51″N 76°43′31.95″W	
The Old United States Arsenal		Pikesville, Maryland	MD 140, north of Sudbrook Lane; 39°22′29″N 76°43′23″W	
The Sweathouse Road		Kingsville, Maryland	US 1 (Belair Road) northbound, southwest of Mount Vista Rd. 39°26′03.557″N 76°25′56.336″W	
The Valley of Jehosophat		Timonium, Maryland	MD 146 (east side), 0.25 miles north of Timonium Road; 39°27′07″N 76°35′34″W	
Third and Last County Almshouse		Timonium, Maryland	Van Buren Lane, north of Jefferson Avenue; 39°27′36″N 76°37′40″W	
Todd's Inheritance		Edgemere, Maryland	North Point Road (east side) at Avenue C 39°12′51″N 76°26′16″W	
Trentham		Garrison, Maryland	Cradock Lane (westbound), 55 ft. south of Village Queen Drive; 39°24′03.95″N 76°44′52.19″W	
Union of Brothers and Sisters of Ford's Asbury Lodge No. 1		Perry Hall, Maryland	Philadelphia Road (southbound), north of Allender Road; 39°24′36.06″N 76°24′37.50″W	
Virginia Hall		Parkton, Maryland	19300 block York Road (MD 45), south of Stablers Church Road; 39°39′12.3″N 76°39′14.2″W	
Whitemarsh		White Marsh, Maryland	Ebenezer Road (westbound), 0.2 miles northwest of US 40; 39°23′01″N 76°25′50″W	
Women's Suffrage		Overlea, Maryland	6908 Belair Rd. 39°21′26.81″N 76°31′40.00″W	
