= List of Maryland state historical markers in Caroline County =

This is a list of the Maryland state historical markers in Caroline County.

This is intended to be a complete list of the official state historical markers placed in Caroline County, Maryland by the Maryland Historical Trust (MHT). The locations of the historical markers, as well as the latitude and longitude coordinates as provided by the MHT's database, are included below. There are currently 13 historical markers located in Caroline County.

Marker title	Image	City	Location	Topics
Caroline Court House		Denton, Maryland	Market Street (north side) on court house lawn 38°53′11.98″N 75°53′49.24″W	
Choptank		Choptank, Maryland	Choptank Road at Poplar Neck Road, southeast corner 38°40′57.05″N 75°57′04.03″W	
Colonel William Richardson		Harmony, Maryland	MD 16 at Wilkins Bridge Road, northwest corner 38°47′36.49″N 75°52′10.21″W	
Denton		Denton, Maryland	MD 619 (6th Street) at 5th Street; 38°52′53.93″N 75°49′44.12″W	
Goldsborough House		Greensboro, Maryland	Sunset Avenue at Church Street; 38°58′27.83″N 75°48′24.88″W	
Greensboro		Greensboro, Maryland	MD 313 (Greensboro Road) at MD 314; 38°58′23.26″N 75°47′57.17″W	
Linchester		Preston, Maryland	MD 331/16 (west side), 0.2 miles north of MD 318; 38°42′05.02″N 75°53′49.24″W	
Marshyhope Creek Bridge		Federalsburg, Maryland	E. Central Avenue at SE corner of Marshyhope Creek Bridge; 38°41′39.90″N 75°46′18.37″W	
Neck Meeting House		Denton, Maryland	MD 404 (north side), 0.1 mile west of MD 328; 38°53′29.89″N 75°50′35.28″W	
Peter Harrington - Revolutionary Officer		Greensboro, Maryland	MD 480 (Main Street) at Cedar Lane, southwest corner 38°58′33.87″N 75°48′15.72″W	
Preston		Preston, Maryland	northbound MD 331, south side of town 38°42′25.1″N 75°54′07.8″W	
Site of Frazier's Chapel		Preston, Maryland	MD 16 (Harmony Road) at MD 331; 38°42′47.46″N 75°54′31.70″W	
St. Paul's Episcopal Church		Hillsboro, Maryland	Church Street at Maple Avenue, southeast corner 38°54′56.81″N 75°56′31.33″W	
