= Battle of Folck's Mill =

Battle of the American Civil War

Coordinates: 39.6639°N 78.7530°W

- Part of the American Civil War
Date	August 1, 1864
Location	Allegany County, Maryland
Result	Inconclusive

Belligerents
United States (Union)	(Confederate States of America) CSA (Confederacy)

Commanders and leaders
Benjamin F. Kelley	John McCausland

Strength
Three regiments	Two brigades

Casualties and losses
2 killed 3 Wounded	20–25 killed 40–50 wounded

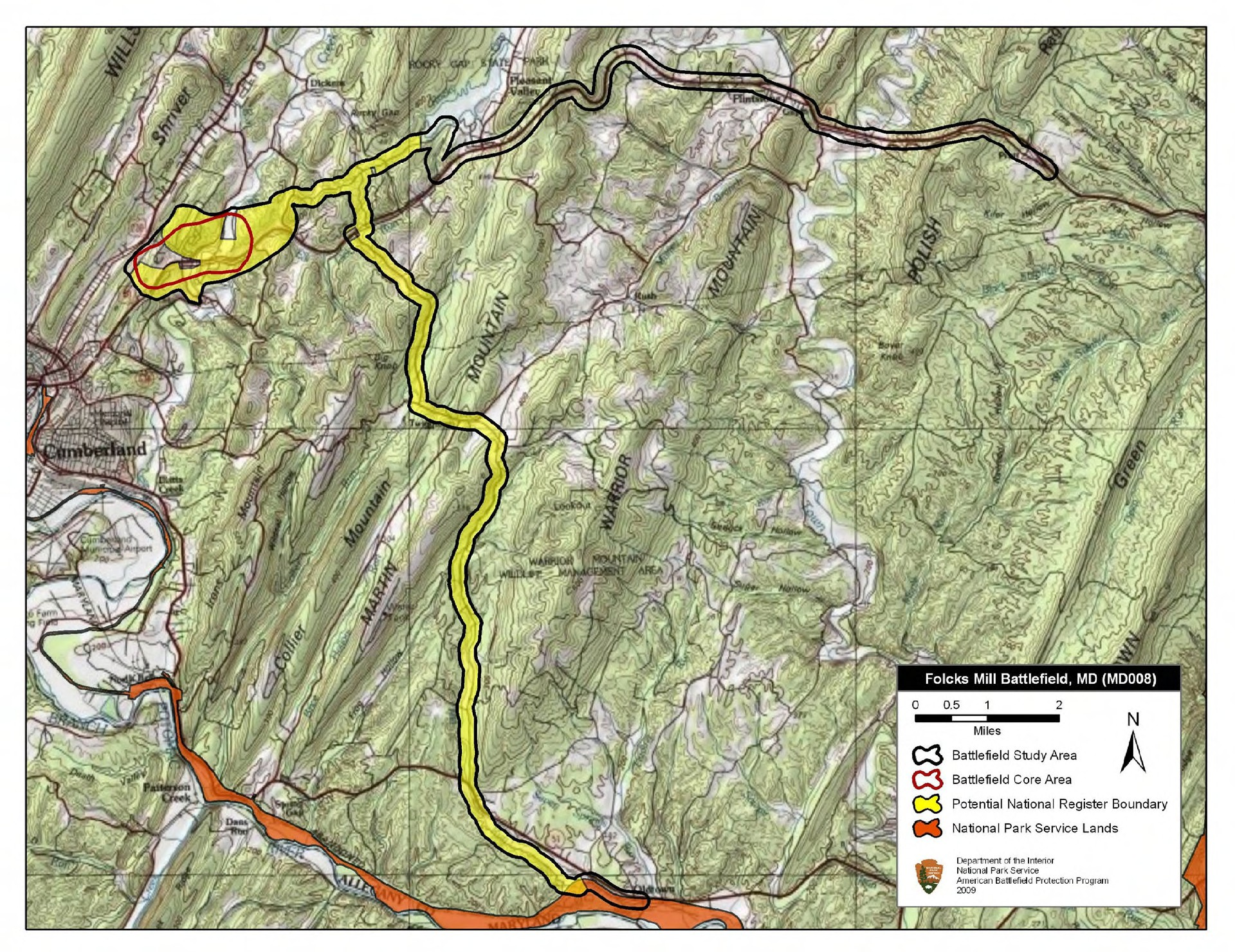
Map of Folck's Mill Battlefield core and study areas by the American Battlefield Protection Program.

The Battle of Folck's Mill, also known as the Battle of Cumberland, was a small cavalry engagement, fought August 1, 1864, in northern Maryland, as part of the Valley Campaigns of 1864 during the American Civil War.

After burning Chambersburg, Pennsylvania, on July 30, cavalry under Confederate generals John McCausland and Bradley T. Johnson set out for western Maryland towards Cumberland, to disrupt traffic on the Baltimore and Ohio (B&O) Railroad and to demand a ransom from the town or torch it as well. At 3 p.m. on August 1, the Confederates arrived at Folck's Mill, east of Cumberland. There, Union Brig. Gen. Benjamin F. Kelley, with three regiments of untested "100-days" troops and six pieces of artillery, met the Confederate advance. As the Confederates arrived at the outskirts of town, Kelley's artillery fired on the cavalry. Lacking familiarity with the local terrain and the strength of the opposing force, McCausland decided against an assault and brought up his own artillery. The gunners from both armies dueled until about 8 p.m., at which point McCausland withdrew, heading southeast to Old Town on the Potomac River.

The following day the Confederates prepared to cross the Potomac and head into West Virginia but found the bridges over the Chesapeake and Ohio Canal had been burned by Col. Israel Stough and his regiment of 100-days troops. Stough deployed his force on the spit of land between the canal and river to contest the Confederate advance toward the river. After initially repulsing a charge by the Confederate cavalry, Stough was forced to retreat across the Potomac when the 21st Virginia successfully constructed a bridge and crossed the canal on his left flank. On the south bank of the river the Federals took cover in a blockhouse on the B&O Railroad and in an armored ordnance train operated by the Potomac Home Brigade that was stopped on the line. McCausland briefly considered an all out charge on the blockhouse, but then thought it wise to first demand its surrender. The Federals in the blockhouse agreed to the terms of surrender, and the Confederates crossed the river and headed to Springfield, West Virginia, where they rested until the 4th.

Although the action around Cumberland was tactically inconclusive, Kelley's stand likely saved the town from being burned and greater damage being inflicted on the railroads. The stubborn resistance of Stough at the Potomac represented the first time McCausland's force had been contested since burning Chambersburg.

== Union Forces ==
Forces West of Sleepy Creek: Brigadier General Benjamin F. Kelley

- 153rd Ohio National Guard: Colonel Israel Stough
- 156th Ohio National Guard: Colonel Caleb Marker
- 11th West Virginia Infantry, 4 Companies: Maj. J. L. Simpson
- 1st Illinois Light Artillery, Battery L: Lt J. McAfee
- 2nd Potomac Home Guard Maryland Infantry: Cpt Petrie
