= List of Maryland state historical markers in Prince George's County =

This is a list of the Maryland state historical markers in Prince George's County.

This is intended to be a complete list of the official state historical markers placed in Prince George's County, Maryland by the Maryland Historical Trust (MHT). The locations of the historical markers, as well as the latitude and longitude coordinates as provided by the MHT's database, are included below. There are currently 59 historical markers located in Prince George's County.

Marker title	Image	City	Location	Topics
Adelphi Mill		Adelphi, Maryland	MD 212 (Riggs Road) southbound, north of Northwest Branch Bridge; 38°59′35″N 76°58′18″W	
Beall's Pleasure		Landover, Maryland	2900 Bealls Pleasure Road, .2 mile north of MD 202 (Largo-Landover Road); 38°55′49.1″N 76°53′13.5″W	
Belair Mansion		Bowie, Maryland	MD 197 (Collington Road) northbound at Tulip Grove Drive; 38°58′07″N 76°45′16″W	
Bellefields Formerly Sim's Delight		Upper Marlboro, Maryland	Bellefields Road (north side), off Duley Station Rd. 38°44′42.4″N 76°46′35.7″W	
Birthplace of John Carroll		Upper Marlboro, Maryland	Main Street, between East and West Street; 38°48′59″N 76°45′04″W	
Bowie State University		Bowie, Maryland	front of Thurgood Marshall Library, Bowie State University; 39°01′06.00″N 76°45′38.00″W	
Brig Gen Leonard Covington		Aquasco, Maryland	MD 381 at St. Mary's Church Rd. 38°35′13″N 76°43′30″W	
Calvert Manor		Accokeek, Maryland	Farmington Road, east of Wannas Drive; 38°41′11″N 77°00′18″W	
Chapel Hill		Fort Washington, Maryland	11710 Old Fort Rd. 38°43′42.1″N 76°58′43.0″W	
Cheltenham United Methodist Church		Cheltenham, Maryland	US 301 (west side), .1 mile north of Frank Tippet Road, 150 feet west of road 38°44′13.22″N 76°49′29.38″W	
Christ Episcopal Church - Accokeek		Accokeek, Maryland	Bryan Point Road at Farmington Road; 38°40′32″N 77°01′15″W	
College Park Airport		College Park, Maryland	at airport at north end of 51st Avenue, .25 mi. north of Paint Branch Parkway; 38°58′40″N 76°55′30″W	
Croom		Croom, Maryland	Croom Rd. at Kendalwood Dr. 38°45′33.26″N 76°45′38.33″W	
Dueling Grounds		Brentwood, Maryland	Alternate US 1 (Bladensburg Road) northbound at 38th Avenue; 38°56′02″N 76°57′08″W	
Ebenezer Meeting House		Beltsville, Maryland	Old Gunpowder Road (northbound), 1000 ft. north of MD 212 (Powder Mill Road); 39°03′07″N 76°55′21″W	
George Washington House		Bladensburg, Maryland	Alternate US 1 (Baltimore Avenue) at Upshur Street, in median 38°56′28″N 76°56′29″W	
Greenbelt		Greenbelt, Maryland	Southway, north of Baltimore-Washington Parkway off-ramp 38°59′49″N 76°52′44″W	
Hall Station		Bowie, Maryland	15512 Hall Rd., west of railroad tracks 38°54′10″N 76°44′10″W	
His Lordship's Kindness		Clinton, Maryland	Entrance drive to His Lordship's Kindness (right side); 38°46′48.27″N 76°50′45″W	
Historic Fort Lincoln Cemetery		Bladensburg, Maryland	Fort Lincoln Cemetery off Bladensburg Road; 38°55′53″N 76°57′17″W	
Hitching Post Hill or Ash Hill		Hyattsville, Maryland	Rosemary Lane at Bridle Path Lane; 38°58′42″N 76°57′32″W	
Holy Trinity Church		Bowie, Maryland	MD 450 (Annapolis Road), north side, .23 mile west of High Bridge Road; 38°58′24″N 76°46′39.8″W	
Immanuel Church Horsehead, Maryland		Brandywine, Maryland	MD 381 (Aquasco Road) northbound at Horsehead Road; 38°39′05″N 76°46′17″W	
John Hanson		Oxon Hill, Maryland	MD 414 (Oxon Hill Road) eastbound, east of MD 210; 38°48′10″N 76°59′36″W	
John Wilkes Booth		Clinton, Maryland	Brandywine Road (northbound), 500 ft. south of MD 223; 38°45′49″N 76°53′50″W	
John Wilkes Booth and His Companion David Herold		Brandywine, Maryland	US 301 (southbound), south of MD 5; 38°39′34″N 76°52′27″W	
Laurel Railroad Depot		Laurel, Maryland	First Street at Main Street; 39°06′09.8208″N 76°50′30.7104″W	
Lincoln		Buena Vista, Maryland	MD 450 (Annapolis Road) southbound, at Baltimore Lane; 38°57′31.380″N 76°49′33.900″W	
Marietta - Home of Gabriel Duvall		Glenn Dale, Maryland	Bell Station Road, near MD 193 (Glenn Dale Boulevard); 38°58′00″N 76°47′53″W	
Marlborough		Upper Marlboro, Maryland	MD 725 (Main Street) at Old Marlboro Pike; 38°48′55″N 76°45′16″W	
Melwood Park		Upper Marlboro, Maryland	Old Marlboro Pike (north side), 1/2 mile east of MD 223 (Woodyard Road); 38°48′42.78″N 76°49′00″W	
Methodist Preaching Place		Greenbelt, Maryland	MD 201 (Kenilworth Avenue) southbound, 300 ft. north of Crescent Road; 39°00′26″N 76°53′33″W	
Montpelier		Laurel, Maryland	MD 197 (eastbound) at Montpelier Drive; 39°04′13″N 76°50′37″W	
Mother Jones Champion of Labor		Adelphi, Maryland	east side of MD 212 (Powder Mill Road), north of intersection with Riggs Road; 39°01′36.1″N 76°57′52.5″W	
Mount Airy		Upper Marlboro, Maryland	MD 223 (Woodyard Road), east side, at south side of entrance gate to Mount Airy; 38°45′56.79″N 76°49′23.82″W	
Mount Lubentia		Largo, Maryland	MD 202 (Largo-Landover Road) west side, 0.1 mile south of Kettering Drive; 38°52′57.5″N 76°48′48.9″W	
Piscataway		Piscataway, Maryland	MD 223 at Floral Park Road, Prince George's County Across from 2105 Floral Park Road38°42′05.04″N 76°58′16.20″W	
Ridgley		Ridgely, Maryland	8900 Central Ave. 38°53′27.7″N 76°51′08.4″W	
Riversdale		Riverdale, Maryland	US 1 (Baltimore Avenue) northbound, between Harrison Street and Oliver Street; 38°57′41″N 76°56′23″W	
Sacred Heart Chapel - White Marsh		Bowie, Maryland	MD 450 (Annapolis Road), east of Race Track Road; 38°59′04.23″N 76°43′10″W	
Site of Rhodes Tavern		Beltsville, Maryland	US 1 and Milestone Way, northwest corner 39°01′23.2″N 76°55′27.8″W	
Site of Van Horn's Tavern		Vansville, Maryland	Odell Road and Old Baltimore Pike, southeast corner 39°02′34.5″N 76°53′43.5″W	
St. Barnabas' Church		Upper Marlboro, Maryland	Church Road at Oak Grove Road; 38°52′30″N 76°45′34″W	
St. John's Church		Fort Washington, Maryland	Old St. John's Way, off Livingston Road; 38°45′21″N 77°00′03″W	
St. Paul's Episcopal Church - Baden		Brandywine, Maryland	Baden-Westwood Road at Horsehead Road; 38°39′38″N 76°46′18″W	
St. Simon's Episcopal Mission		Croom, Maryland	MD 382 (Croom Road) at St. Thomas Church Road, northeast corner 38°44′55.9″N 76°45′36.1″W	
St. Thomas' Parish Church		Upper Marlboro, Maryland	MD 382 (Croom Road) at St. Thomas Church Road; 38°44′55.45″N 76°45′36.59″W	
St. Thomas' Parish Church		Croom, Maryland	St. Thomas Church Road (north side), 440 feet east of MD 382 (Croom Road); 38°44′53.9″N 76°45′31.4″W	
Suffrage Motorcade		Hyattsville, Maryland	US 1 at 41st Place; 38°56′45.6″N 76°56′47.0″W	
T.B.		Brandywine, Maryland	MD 373 at Old Brandywine Rd. 38°42′04.62″N 76°52′28.5″W	
The Belair Stud Farm Cradle of American Racing		Bowie, Maryland	MD 450 (Annapolis Road) eastbound at Belair Drive; 38°58′39″N 76°44′29″W	
The First Telegram What Hath God Wrought		Laurel, Maryland	Main Street and First Street; 39°06′09.4464″N 76°50′31.5816″W	
Thomas John Claggett, D.D.		Upper Marlboro, Maryland	Church Street; 38°48′53″N 76°45′12″W	
Toaping Castle		Greenbelt, Maryland	Walker Drive, north of MD 193 (Greenbelt Road); 38°59′48″N 76°53′41″W	
Tomb of Dr. William Beanes		Upper Marlboro, Maryland	U.S. 301 (west side), 470 feet north of Chrysler Drive; 38°49′07.74″N 76°44′13.80″W	
Tomb of Dr. William Beanes		Upper Marlboro, Maryland	MD 4 eastbound, west of US 301; 38°48′38.88″N 76°45′17.28″W	
Van Horn's Tavern		Beltsville, Maryland	US 1 (Baltimore Avenue), northbound, at Prince Georges Road; 39°02′11.37″N 76°54′20.73″W	
Warburton Manor		Fort Washington, Maryland	On a grassy hilltop in Fort Washington Park; 38°42′50.1″N 77°01′45.9″W	
Woodville School		Aquasco, Maryland	21500 Aquasco Rd. 38°35′39.92″N 76°43′22.25″W	
