= List of Maryland state historical markers in Montgomery County =

This is a list of the Maryland state historical markers in Montgomery County.

This is intended to be a complete list of the official state historical markers placed in Montgomery County, Maryland by the Maryland Historical Trust (MHT). The locations of the historical markers, as well as the latitude and longitude coordinates as provided by the MHT's database, are included below. There are currently 22 historical markers located in Montgomery County.

Marker title	Image	City	Location	Topics
Brookeville		Brookeville, Maryland	MD 97 (northbound), 25 meters south of Market Street; 39°10′49.355″N 77°03′30.854″W	
Chesapeake and Ohio Aqueduct across the Monocacy River		Dickerson, Maryland	MD 28 (eastbound) at Mouth of Monocacy Road; 39°13′29″N 77°25′36″W	
Chesapeake and Ohio Canal National Historical Park		White's Ferry, Maryland	MD 107 (White's Ferry Road) at River Road; 39°09′18.08″N 77°31′00.98″W	
Damascus		Damascus, Maryland	MD 108 (eastbound) at MD 124; 39°17′17″N 77°12′07″W	
Daniel Carroll of Rock Creek		Silver Spring, Maryland	MD 192 (Forest Glenn Avenue) westbound at Rosensteel Avenue; 39°00′54″N 77°03′00″W	
Dr. Thomas Sprigg Wootton		Rockville, Maryland	2110 Wootton Pkwy; 39°04′35.6″N 77°10′54.7″W	
Early Blacksmith Shop		Potomac, Maryland	MD 190 at Seven Locks Road; 38°59′34″N 77°09′39″W	
Edward's Ferry		Poolesville, Maryland	Edwards Ferry Road at MD 190 (River Road), north corner 39°06′17.10″N 77°28′17.44″W	
Elton		Sunshine, Maryland	MD 97 (southbound) at MD 650; 39°13′21″N 77°03′35″W	
General Edward Braddock		Gaithersburg, Maryland	MD 355 at Summit Avenue, northeast corner 39°08′17.79″N 77°11′39.52″W	
Gold Mining in Maryland		Potomac, Maryland	River Rd. (MD190), approx. 1/2 mile W of Falls Rd. (MD 189); 39°01′15.12″N 77°12′17.82″W	
Jeremiah Crabbe		Gaithersburg, Maryland	MD 355 (east side), 150 m southeast of Indianola Drive; 39°06′39.93″N 77°09′38.92″W	
Planetary Radio Emissions Discovery Site		Seneca, Maryland	Parking Area for McKee-Beshers WMA; 39°04′54.06″N 77°22′21.36″W	
Richard Montgomery		Rockville, Maryland	100 block of E Jefferson St (MD 28); 39°04′59.35″N 77°09′06.19″W	
Rockville (County Seat)		Rockville, Maryland	S. Washington Street at W. Jefferson Street, southwest corner 39°04′59.86″N 77°09′10.90″W	
Rockville (Gen. J.E.B. Stuart)		Rockville, Maryland	E. Montgomery Avenue at Maryland Avenue; 39°05′02.34″N 77°09′05.17″W	
Rowser's Ford		Seneca, Maryland	Violette's Lock Road (south side), west of MD 190 (River Road); 39°04′30.37″N 77°19′35.64″W	
Seneca Schoolhouse		Poolesville, Maryland	16800 River Rd. 39°04′52″N 77°21′05″W	
The Clara Barton House		Glen Echo, Maryland	MD 614 at MacArthur Boulevard; 38°58′07″N 77°08′21″W	
Washington's Farm		Dickerson, Maryland	MD 28 (westbound), 2.3 miles south of B&O tracks 39°11′53″N 77°25′43″W	
White's Ferry		Dawsonville, Maryland	MD 28 (north side) at MD 107 (White's Ferry Road); 39°07′43.04″N 77°20′34.93″W	
White's Ford		Martinsburg, Maryland	MD 107 (White's Ferry Road) at Martinsburg Road; 39°09′51.19″N 77°28′32.20″W	
