= List of Maryland state historical markers in Washington County =

This is a list of the Maryland state historical markers in Washington County.

This is intended to be a complete list of the official state historical markers placed in Washington County, Maryland by the Maryland Historical Trust (MHT). The locations of the historical markers, as well as the latitude and longitude coordinates as provided by the MHT's database, are included below. There are currently 43 historical markers located in Washington County.

Marker title	Image	City	Location	Topics
An Indian Deed		Sharpsburg, Maryland	Harpers Ferry Road, south side of Antietam Iron Works Bridge (over Antietam Creek); 39°24′59.82″N 77°44′31.86″W	
Battle of Funkstown		Funkstown, Maryland	US 40 Alt (Old National Pike) at East Green Street, northwest corner 39°36′24.40″N 77°42′19.03″W	
Blackford's Ford		Sharpsburg, Maryland	MD 34 (Shepherdstown Pike) at Canal Road; 39°26′16.38″N 77°47′48.11″W	
Brownsville-Burkittsville Pass		Brownsville, Maryland	Main Street (Boteler Road) at Brownsville Pass Road; 39°22′56.28″N 77°39′37.81″W	
Confederate Retreat		Rohrersville, Maryland	Gapland Road (south side), 800 ft. east of MD 67 (Rohrersville Road); 39°23′59.18″N 77°39′16.91″W	
Crampton Gap		Rohrersville, Maryland	MD 67 (Rohrersville Road), about 1/4 mile south of Gapland Road; 39°23′55″N 77°39′18″W	
Crampton's Gap, Maryland Heights and Pleasant Valley		Boonsboro, Maryland	Alt US 40 (Old National Pike) south side, 100 ft. east of MD 67 (Rohrersville Road); 39°29′49.57″N 77°38′41.41″W	
Dam No. 5		Clear Spring, Maryland	Dam No. 5 Road, at dam, above lock house and parking lot 39°36′28.27″N 77°55′18.37″W	
Falling Waters		Williamsport, Maryland	Falling Waters Road end, gravel road adjacent to Hunt Club; 39°33′26.79″N 77°53′04.62″W	
Ferry Hill Place		Sharpsburg, Maryland	MD 34 (Shepherdstown Pike), east of Canal Road; 39°26′19″N 77°47′38″W	
Fort Coombe		Hancock, Maryland	High Street at Virginia Street, southwest corner 39°42′02.39″N 78°11′05.61″W	
Fort Frederick - Maryland State Park		Clear Spring, Maryland	US 40 (National Pike) at Martin Street, northwest corner 39°39′22.44″N 77°55′54.86″W	
Fort Frederick - Maryland State Park		Indian Springs, Maryland	US 40 (National Pike) at MD 56 (Big Pool Road), southeast corner 39°38′46.16″N 78°00′13.48″W	
Fort Mills		Big Pool, Maryland	US 40 (National Pike) at Park Head Methodist Church, 2.5 miles west of Indian Springs; 39°39′13.71″N 78°02′45.27″W	
Gen. J.E.B. Stuart's Calvary		Clear Spring, Maryland	US 40 (National Pike) at Cove Road, 3 miles west of Clear Spring; 39°38′54.10″N 77°58′59.71″W	
Gen. Robert E. Lee		Hagerstown, Maryland	US 40 Alt (Frederick Street), 0.3 mile south of Wilson Boulevard; 39°37′00.85″N 77°42′42.67″W	
General Edward Braddock		Sharpsburg, Maryland	MD 34 (Main Street), 200 ft. east of Harper's Ferry Road; 39°27′29.74″N 77°44′54.03″W	
General J.E.B. Stuart		Williamsport, Maryland	Virginia Avenue (US Route 11), 0.1 mile northeast of Tammany Road; 39°36′37.65″N 77°47′20.15″W	
Jacob Wheaton		Hagerstown, Maryland	MD 65 (S. Potomac St.), east side, across from 727 S. Potomac St. 39°37′46.99″N 77°43′28.96″W	
John Brown		Dargan, Maryland	Chestnut Grove Road on Kennedy Farm, 1/2 mile north of Harpers Ferry Road; 39°22′46.77″N 77°42′49.92″W	
Jonathan Hager House		Hagerstown, Maryland	South Walnut Street, 0.1 mile north of South Prospect Street; 39°38′22.61″N 77°43′42.41″W	
Jones' Crossroads		Lappans, Maryland	MD 68 (Lappans Road) at MD 65 (Sharpsburg Pike), 1 mile north of Fairplay; 39°33′12.63″N 77°44′13.03″W	
Lancelot Jacques		Clear Spring, Maryland	MD 56 (Big Pool Road) 40 meters southwest of McCoy Ferry Road; 39°37′20.05″N 77°58′28.68″W	
Mason and Dixon Line 100th Mile Stone		Hagerstown, Maryland	Marsh Pike at Maryland/Pennsylvania line, 5 miles northeast of Hagerstown; 39°43′14.74″N 77°40′22.64″W	
Mason and Dixon Line 105th Mile Stone		Cearfoss, Maryland	MD 63 (Greencastle Pike) west side, at Pennsylvania State Line; 39°43′16.6794″N 77°46′06.6714″W	
McCoy's Ferry		Clear Spring, Maryland	End of McCoy's Ferry Road, atop a tunnel at entrance to Canal Park; 39°36′29.32″N 77°58′12.64″W	
Old Mr. Flint's Home		Hancock, Maryland	MD 144 (Western Pike), 0.4 mile east of Roundtop Road, 0.2 mile west of Locher Road; 39°41′55.63″N 78°12′19.97″W	
Rose Hill		Williamsport, Maryland	MD 63 (Spielman Road), 1.5 miles south of Williamsport; 39°34′44.81″N 77°48′56.97″W	
Springfield Farm		Williamsport, Maryland	MD 11 (Potomac Street) at Springfield Lane; 39°36′07.89″N 77°48′47.43″W	
St. Thomas Church		Hancock, Maryland	Main Street (MD 144) at Church Street, northwest corner 39°41′55.92″N 78°10′39.93″W	
Stonewall Jackson's Way		Boonsboro, Maryland	US 40 Alt (Main Street) at Lappans Road (MD 68), northwest corner 39°31′12.51″N 77°39′36.80″W	
Swearingen's Ferry and Pack Horse Ford		Sharpsburg, Maryland	MD 34 (Shepherdstown Pike) at Canal Road, 1200 ft. east of Potomac River; 39°26′16.53″N 77°47′48.17″W	
The Bank Road		Conococheague, Maryland	Eastbound US 40 west of Conococheague Creek; 39°39′26.7″N 77°51′39.3″W	
The Battle of Antietam or Sharpsburg		Boonsboro, Maryland	US 40 Alt (Old National Pike) north side, 0.15 mile west of MD 67 (Rohrersville Road); 39°29′57.90″N 77°38′49.19″W	
The Battle of Antietam or Sharpsburg		Sharpsburg, Maryland	MD 34 (Shepherdstown Pike) at Canal Road, 1200 ft. east of Potomac River; 39°26′16.82″N 77°47′49.07″W	
The Federal Signal Station		Clear Spring, Maryland	US 40 (National Pike), 2 miles east of MD 56 (Big Pool Road); 39°38′44.86″N 77°58′06.50″W	
The James Rumsey Bridge		Sharpsburg, Maryland	MD 34 (Shepherdstown Pike) at Canal Road, 1200 ft. east of Potomac River; 39°26′13.06″N 77°47′59.93″W	
The Long Meadow		Hagerstown, Maryland	Marsh Pike, 0.1 mile south of Blossom Lane, 3 miles northeast of Hagerstown; 39°41′41.89″N 77°41′13.47″W	
Thomas Kennedy		Hagerstown, Maryland	MD 65 (S. Potomac Street) across from 649 South Potomac Street; 39°37′51.3″N 77°43′25.6″W	
Tonoloway Fort		Hancock, Maryland	MD 144 (Western Pike) at Locher Road; 39°41′54.33″N 78°12′07.18″W	
Williamsport		Williamsport, Maryland	Potomac Street (US Route 11), 0.2 mile east of MD 63 (Greencastle Pike); 39°36′05.06″N 77°48′55.63″W	
Williamsport (Conococheague)		Williamsport, Maryland	At Memorial Library, just east of Artizan Street and MD 11 (Potomac Street); 39°36′02.31″N 77°49′03.06″W	
Wilson Bridge		Conococheague, Maryland	off US 40 (National Pike), at Old Wilson Bridge; 39°39′27.17″N 77°50′46.58″W	
