= List of Maryland state historical markers in Calvert County =

This is a list of the Maryland state historical markers in Calvert County.

This is intended to be a complete list of the official state historical markers placed in Calvert County, Maryland by the Maryland Historical Trust (MHT). The locations of the historical markers, as well as the latitude and longitude coordinates as provided by the MHT's database, are included below. There are currently 30 historical markers located in Calvert County.

Marker title	Image	City	Location	Topics
All Saints Episcopal Church		Sunderland, Maryland	MD 4 at MD 2, northeast corner, at churchyard entrance 38°39′41″N 76°36′24″W	
Amphibious Training Base		Solomons, Maryland	Dowell Road (west side), 1.2 miles southeast of MD 2/4; 38°20′05″N 76°27′13″W	
Arthur Storer Planetarium		Prince Frederick, Maryland	MD 402 (westbound), 0.5 miles east of MD 2/4; 38°33′05″N 76°34′57″W	
Battle Creek Cypress Swamp		Bowens, Maryland	Gray's Road (west side), 0.1 mile south of MD 506; 38°29′31.29″N 76°35′23.90″W	
Brewhouse		St. Leonard, Maryland	MD 2/4 (southbound) at Parran Road; 38°27′00″N 76°29′39″W	
Calvert County		Chaneyville, Maryland	MD 4 (southbound lane, west side), 300 ft. north of Chaneyville Road; 38°41′28.3″N 76°38′24.2″W	
Chesapeake Beach Railway		Chesapeake Beach, Maryland	MD 261 at Mears Road, in median 38°41′24″N 76°32′08″W	
Chesapeake Biological Laboratory		Solomons, Maryland	Memorial Drive (west side), 0.5 miles south of MD 2/4, in churchyard 38°19′06″N 76°27′11″W	
Christ Church (Episcopal)		Port Republic, Maryland	MD 264 (east side), 0.5 miles south of MD 2/4; 38°29′42″N 76°32′12″W	
Cove Point Lighthouse		Lusby, Maryland	MD 497 (Cove Point Road) south side, 0.1 miles west of MD 765; 38°23′19.6″N 76°25′58.3″W	
Drum Point Lighthouse		Solomons, Maryland	MD 2 (east side), 0.1 miles south of Calvert Marine Museum; 38°19′48.8″N 76°27′52.3″W	
Early Settlements		St. Leonard, Maryland	MD 2/4 (southbound) at Parran Road (north side); 38°27′00″N 76°29′39″W	
Harriett Elizabeth Brown		Sunderland, Maryland	MD 2 (northbound) at Pushaw Station Road; 38°40′20.2″N 76°35′47.1″W	
J.C. Lore & Sons Oyster House		Solomons, Maryland	MD 2 (east side), 0.55 miles south of Calvert Marine Museum; 38°19′27.1″N 76°27′40.9″W	
Lower Marlboro Town		Lower Marlboro, Maryland	MD 262 (Lower Marlboro Road) north side, 4 miles west of MD 4; 38°39′20.05″N 76°40′49.75″W	
M.M Davis Shipyard		Solomons, Maryland	MD 2 (east side), 0.69 miles south of Calvert Marine Museum; 38°19′20.3″N 76°27′34.4″W	
Middleham Chapel		Lusby, Maryland	MD 765 (southbound), 0.8 miles north of MD 497; 38°23′58″N 76°26′14″W	
Morgan Hill Farm		Lusby, Maryland	MD 765 about 50 feet north of Sollers Wharf Road; 38°24′44″N 76°27′26″W	
Old Wallville School		Prince Frederick, Maryland	1450 Dares Beach Rd. 38°33′10.40″N 76°34′11.73″W	
One-Room School		Port Republic, Maryland	MD 265 (east side), 0.5 miles south of MD 2/4; 38°29′40″N 76°32′12″W	
Preston Cliffs or Charles Gift		Lusby, Maryland	MD 2/4 (east side), 100 ft. south of White Sands Drive; 38°26′07.08″N 76°26′43.86″W	
Preston on Patuxent		Lusby, Maryland	MD 765 (Pardoe Road), 100 ft. west of MD 2/4; 38°24′57″N 76°27′27″W	
Prince Frederick Library "Firsts"		Prince Frederick, Maryland	Duke Street (north side), 0.1 mile east of MD 2/4; 38°32′11″N 76°35′06″W	
Revolutionary Leaders Joseph & James Wilkinson		Prince Frederick, Maryland	Stoakley Road (north side), 225 ft. west of MD 2/4; 38°33′29″N 76°35′56″W	
Smithville United Methodist Church		Dunkirk, Maryland	Ferry Landing Road (north side), 100 ft. west of MD 2/4; 38°43′17″N 76°39′41″W	
Solomon's Island		Solomons, Maryland	MD 2 (west side), 0.54 miles south of visitor center 38°19′27.4″N 76°27′40.1″W	
St. Leonard Creek		St. Leonard, Maryland	MD 2/4 (southbound) at Parran Road (north side); 38°27′00″N 76°29′39″W	
The Cliffs of Calvert		Lusby, Maryland	MD 765 (H. G. Trueman Road) east side, 0.5 miles north of MD 497; 38°28′43.3″N 76°26′10.9″W	
Veitch's Cove		Mutual, Maryland	MD 264 at MD 265, southwest corner 38°28′16″N 76°32′55″W	
W. S. Brooks High School		Prince Frederick, Maryland	on Dares Beach Rd. (Rt. 402), 1.1 mi. east of Solomons Island Rd. (Rt. 2); 38°33′9.30″N 76°34′19.4″W	
