= List of Maryland state historical markers in Carroll County =

This is a list of the Maryland state historical markers in Carroll County.

This is intended to be a complete list of the official state historical markers placed in Carroll County, Maryland by the Maryland Historical Trust (MHT). The locations of the historical markers, as well as the latitude and longitude coordinates as provided by the MHT's database, are included below. There are currently 20 historical markers located in Carroll County.

Marker title	Image	City	Location	Topics
Birthplace of William Henry Rinehart		Union Bridge, Maryland	Quaker Hill Road at Ladiesburg Road (east side); 39°33′57.8″N 77°10′18.2″W	
Bridgeport		Taneytown, Maryland	MD 140 (Taneytown Pike), south side, 200 ft east of Bullfrog Road; 39°40′40.6″N 77°13′29.0″W	
Corbit's Charge		Westminster, Maryland	MD 32 (Washington Road) at East Main Street, southeast corner 39°33′59.0″N 76°59′13.4″W	
German Church		Manchester, Maryland	MD 30, .2 miles north of MD 27; 39°40′00.84″N 76°53′19.20″W	
Headquarters Second Corps Army of the Potomac		Uniontown, Maryland	Uniontown Road (south side), 0.5 miles east of Jasontown Road; 39°35′38.7″N 77°05′33.5″W	
Henryton Center		Mariottsville, Maryland	Henryton Road at Henryton Center Road; 39°21′21.26″N 76°54′49.26″W	
Henryton School of Practical Nursing		Marriotsville, Maryland	Henryton Road at Henryton Center Road; 39°21′21.00″N 76°54′50.00″W	
Hood's Mill		Woodbine, Maryland	MD 97 (west side), 0.4 miles south of Eden Mill Road; 39°22′48.61″N 77°01′07.51″W	
Just Government League		Westminster, Maryland	MD 31 (New Windsor Road) at MD 140 (Taneytown Pike); 39°35′18″N 77°00′24″W	
Manchester		Manchester, Maryland	MD 30 (Main Street) at Westminster/ York Streets, northwest corner 39°39′40.7″N 76°53′06.0″W	
Meade's Headquarters		Taneytown, Maryland	MD 194 (FSK Hwy), east side, 500 ft. north of Fringer Road; 39°40′10.3″N 77°09′46.3″W	
Pipe Creek Meeting		Union Bridge, Maryland	Quaker Hill Drive (east side), 0.2 miles south of Ladiesburg Road; 39°33′50.9″N 77°10′10.1″W	
Robert Strawbridge		New Windsor, Maryland	Wakefield Valley Road (south side), 100 ft. east of MD 31; 39°31′50.8″N 77°06′05.4″W	
Spring Garden		Hampstead, Maryland	MD 30 (Main Street) at Black Rock Road, northeast corner 39°36′26.7″N 76°51′03.2″W	
Strawbridge Log Meeting House Site		New Windsor, Maryland	MD 407 (Marston Road) north side, 0.4 miles south of MD 31 (New Windsor Road); 39°30′43.05″N 77°06′20.00″W	
Terra Rubra		Keymar, Maryland	MD 194 (Francis Scott Key Hwy) at Keysville-Bruceville Road, northwest corner 39°36′48.6″N 77°14′10.8″W	
The First Complete County Rural Free Delivery Service		Westminster, Maryland	MD 32 (Main Street) at Longwell Avenue, northeast corner 39°34′24.38″N 76°59′38.36″W	
The First Reaping Machine		Union Bridge, Maryland	200 W Locust St. 39°34′08.3″N 77°11′09.9″W	
Union Mills		Union Mills, Maryland	MD 97 (east side), 0.2 miles south of Old Hanover Road; 39°39′58.4″N 77°01′00.9″W	
Westminster		Westminster, Maryland	N. Center Street, between N. Court Street and North Street, southeast side 39°34′24.4″N 76°59′13.7″W	
