= Folck's Mill =

- U.S. National Register of Historic Places
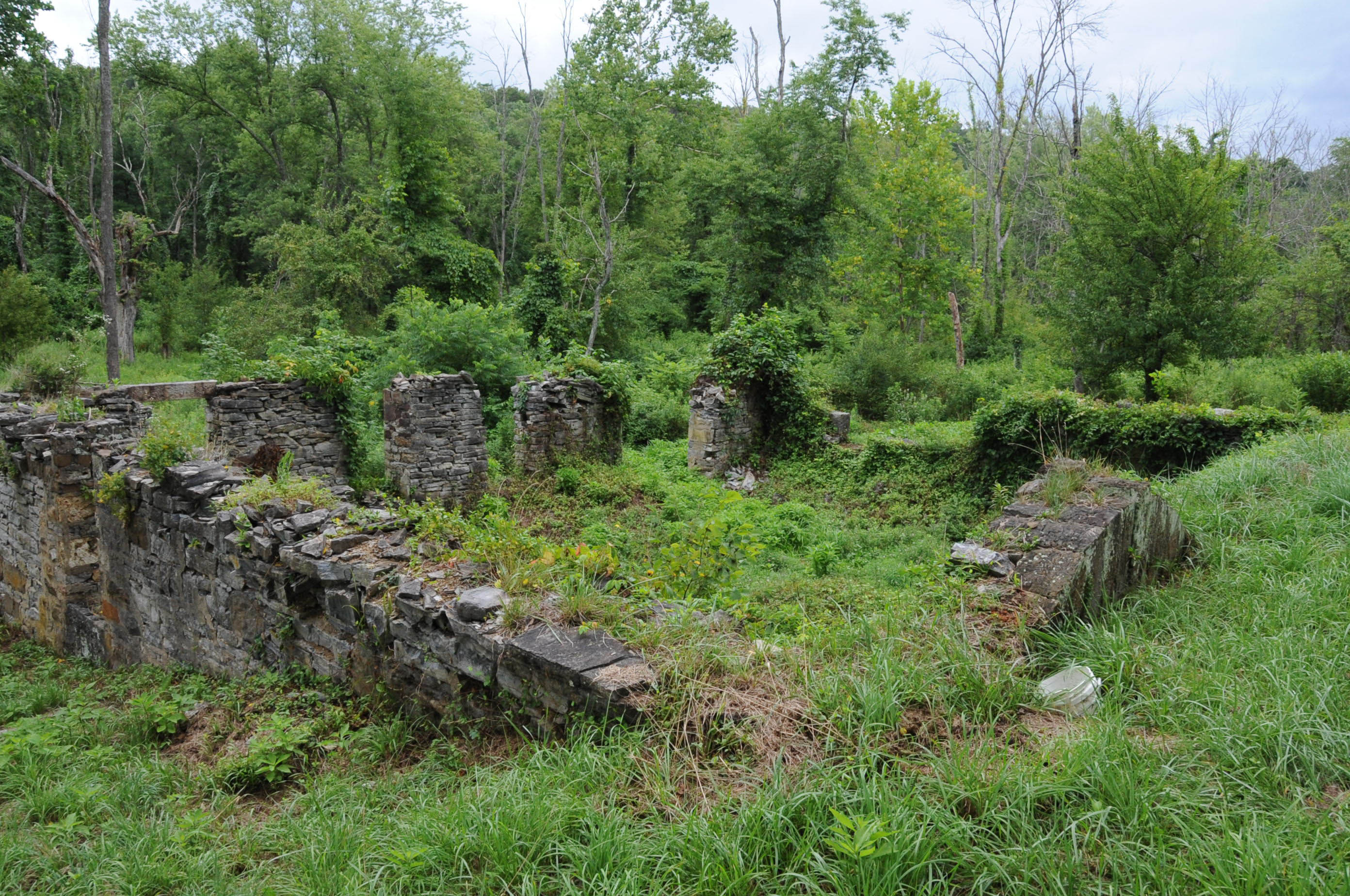

- Location within Maryland Location within the United States
- Location: Allegany County, Maryland, USA
- Coordinates: 39°40′25.4″N 78°43′23.9″W
- Area: 18.5 acres (7.5 ha)
- Built: 1864
- NRHP reference No.: 08001071
- Added to NRHP: November 21, 2008

Folck's Mill is a site containing the remains of a historic grist and saw complex located near Cumberland, Allegany County, Maryland. The stone foundation of the mill, measuring 30 feet by 40 feet, is the principal feature of the site. It is historically significant for its association with the August 1, 1864, Civil War "Battle of Folck's Mill." In that battle, Union troops commanded by General Benjamin F. Kelley engaged General John McCausland’s Confederate forces as they advanced along the Baltimore Pike towards Cumberland after having burned the town of Chambersburg, Pennsylvania, two days previously.

It was listed on the National Register of Historic Places in 2008.
