= Cecil's Mill Historic District =

Historic district in Maryland, United States

- U.S. National Register of Historic Places
- U.S. Historic district
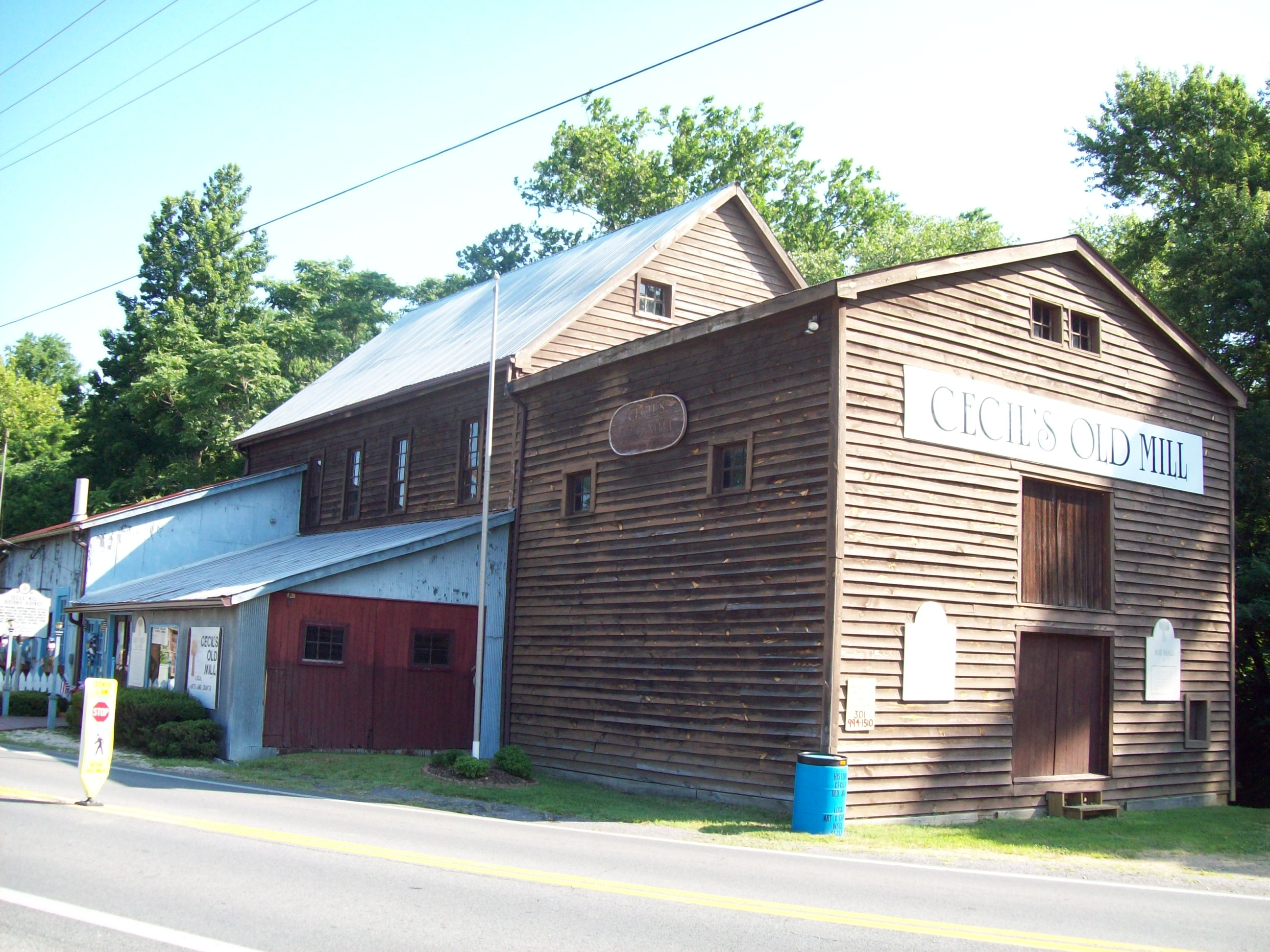
- Cecils Mill Historic District, Mill Building, July 2009

- Location within Maryland Location within the United States
- Nearest city: Great Mills, Maryland
- Coordinates: 38°14′25″N 76°30′13″W
- Built: 1810
- Architect: John T. Cecil
- NRHP reference No.: 78003121
- Added to NRHP: January 30, 1978

Cecil's Mill Historic District is a national historic district in Great Mills, St. Mary's County, Maryland, United States. It consists of four buildings: Cecil's Mill, Cecil Store, the Cecil Home, and Old Holy Face Church. Cecil's Mill is a 2 1/2-story wood-framed structure, that was used until 1959. Across from the mill is the store, house, and Holy Face Church. The store was constructed in the 1920s and is a good example of a rural store. The Cecil Home was constructed in the late 19th century. Old Holy Face Church is a 2 1/2-story frame church that was abandoned in the 1940s.

It was added to the National Register of Historic Places in 1978.

== Gallery ==
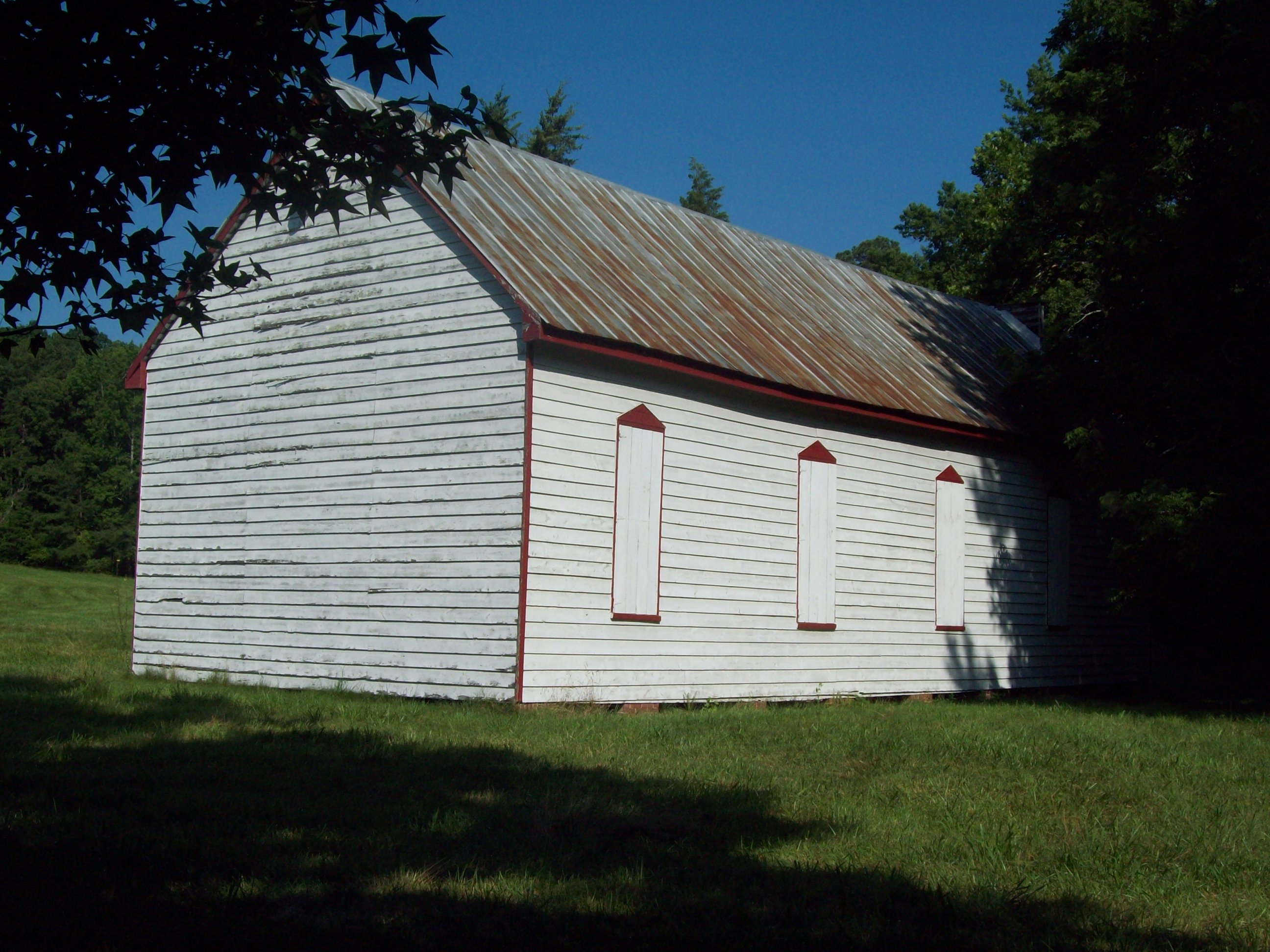
Cecils Mill Historic District, Old Holy Face Church, July 2009

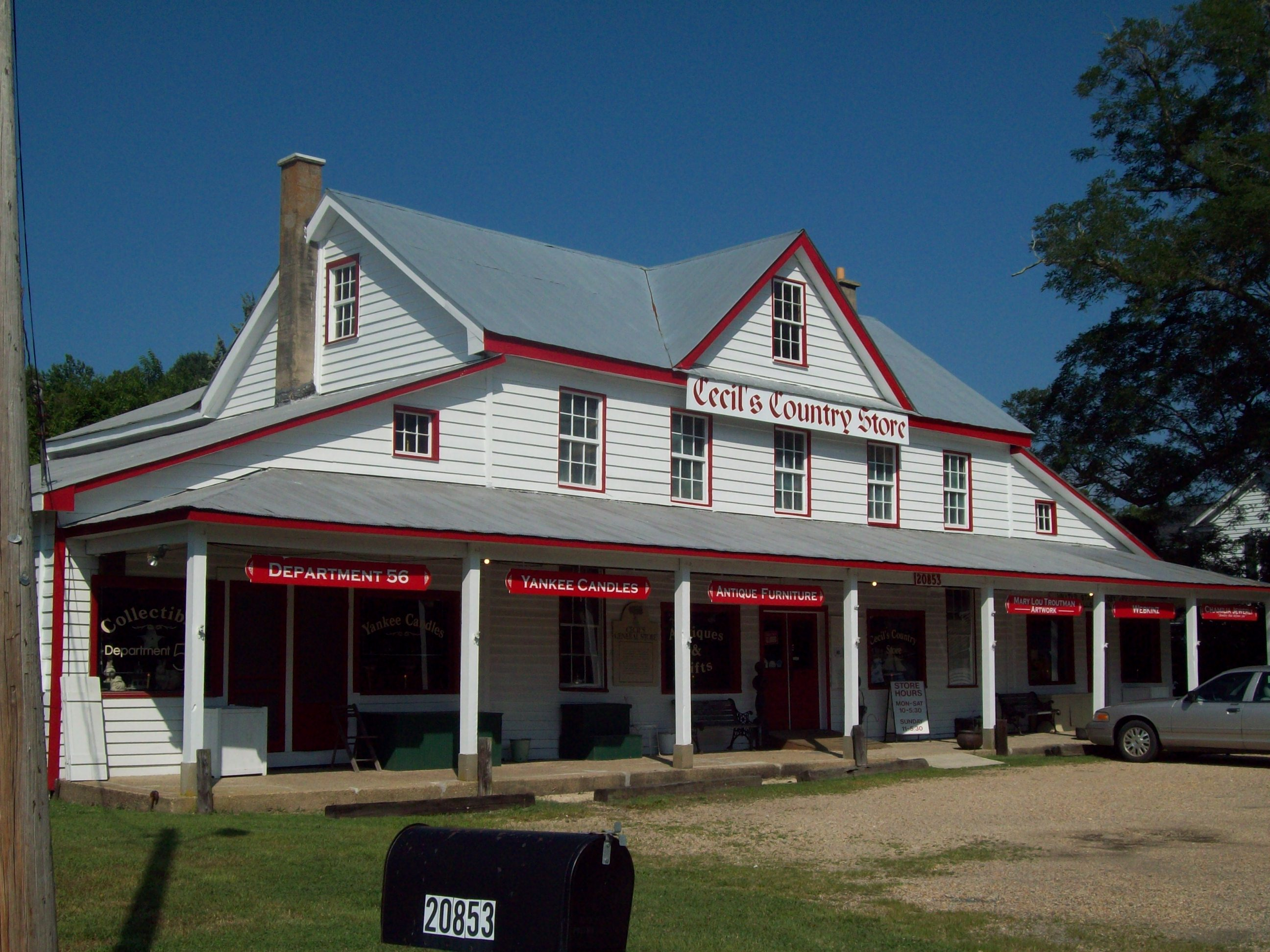
Cecils Mill Historic District, General Store, July 2009
