= Lloyds, Maryland =

Unincorporated community in Maryland, United States

- Unincorporated community
- Location within Maryland
- Coordinates: 38°35′23″N 76°10′59″W
- Country: United States
- State: Maryland
- County: Dorchester
- Elevation: 3 ft (0.91 m)
- Time zone: UTC-5 (Eastern (EST))
  - Summer (DST): UTC-4 (EDT)
- Area codes: 410 & 443
- GNIS feature ID: 588688

Lloyds is an unincorporated community in Dorchester County, Maryland, United States.
