= Mitchell House (Elkton, Maryland) =

Historic house in Maryland, United States

- U.S. National Register of Historic Places
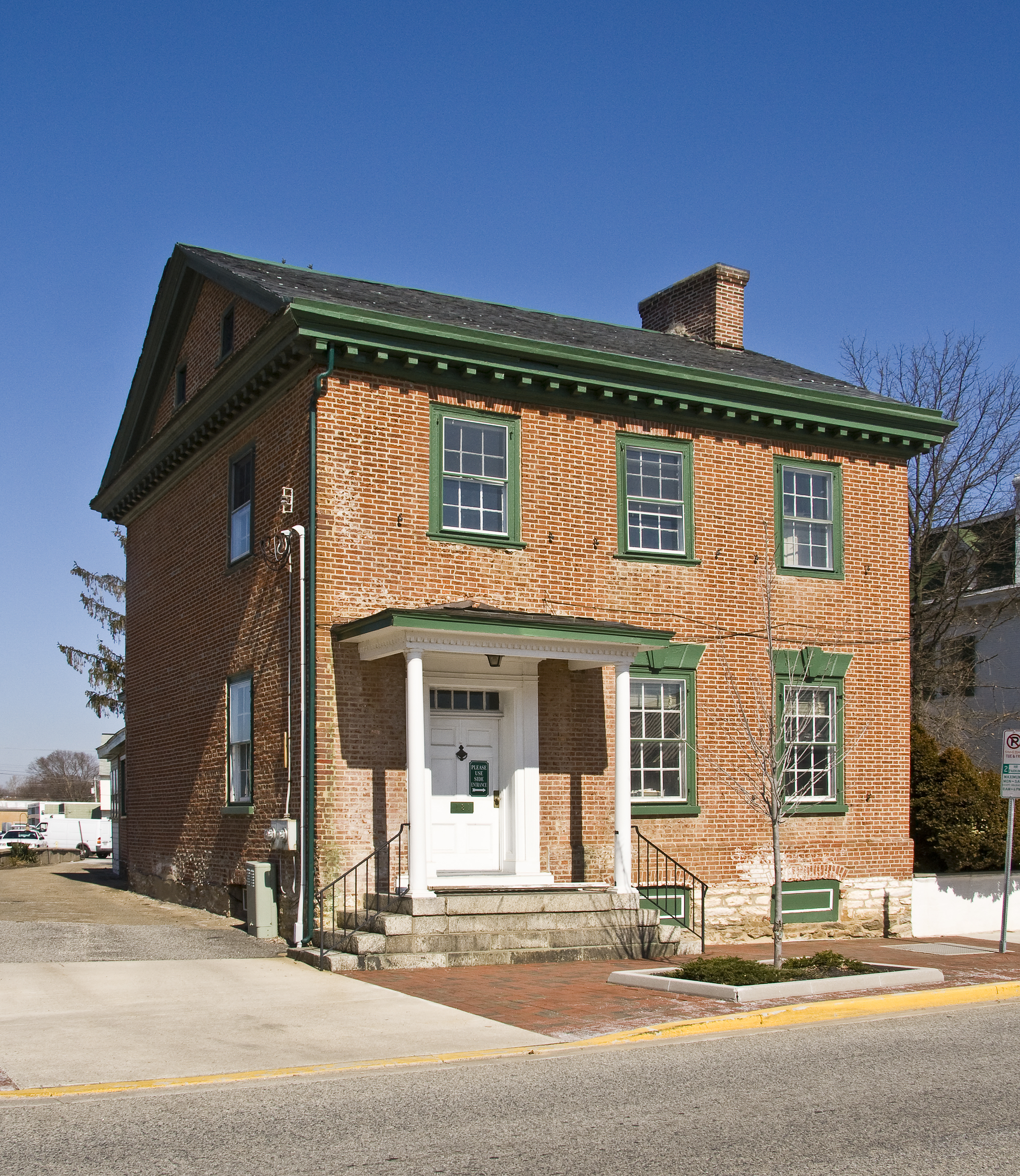
- Mitchell House, March 2010

- Location within Maryland Location within the United States
- Location: 131 E. Main St., Elkton, Maryland
- Coordinates: 39°36′31.16″N 75°49′41.41″W
- Area: 0.2 acres (0.081 ha)
- Built: 1769
- Built by: Mitchell, Abraham
- Architectural style: Georgian
- NRHP reference No.: 76000987
- Added to NRHP: May 13, 1976

Mitchell House is a historic home located at Elkton, Cecil County, Maryland. It is a 2 1/2-story, side passage townhouse built between 1769 and 1781, by Dr. Abraham Mitchell, a physician from Lancaster County, Pennsylvania. It shows fine original detail characteristic of both the early and later periods of the Georgian style.

It was listed on the National Register of Historic Places in 1976.
