= Maryland Historical Trust =

State-level agency responsible for historic preservation in Maryland, US

Agency overview
- Formed: 1966
- Jurisdiction: Maryland
- Headquarters: Maryland Historical Trust, 100 Community Place, Crownsville, Maryland
- Parent agency: Maryland Department of Planning
- Website: http://mht.maryland.gov/

The Maryland Historical Trust is an agency of Maryland Department of Planning and serves as the Maryland State Historic Preservation Office. The agency serves to assist in research, conservation, and education, of Maryland's historical and cultural heritage. The agency is responsible for the management of thousands of historical sites located within the State of Maryland.

== History ==
The agency was originally created in May 1961 as a quasi-public corporation for the purpose "of accepting and maintaining gifts of property and for assisting and encouraging preservation activities throughout the state."

Following the passage of the National Historic Preservation Act which created the National Register of Historic Places in 1966, then Governor Spiro Agnew appointed the Trust’s Director as the State Liaison Officer in 1967 and thus the Trust became the state historic preservation office.

The agency provides archeological surveys.

In 1974, the Maryland Historic Sites Inventory was created by an act of the Maryland Legislature, Annotated Code of Maryland, Article 41, Section 181 KA, 1974 Supplement.

== Awards ==
The board of trustees awards the annual Maryland Preservation Awards.

== See also ==
- List of Howard County properties in the Maryland Historical Trust
- List of Laurel Maryland properties in the Maryland Historical Trust
