= National Register of Historic Places listings in Dorchester County, Maryland =

Location of Dorchester County in Maryland

This is a list of the National Register of Historic Places listings in Dorchester County, Maryland.

This is intended to be a complete list of the properties and districts on the National Register of Historic Places in Dorchester County, Maryland, United States. Latitude and longitude coordinates are provided for many National Register properties and districts; these locations may be seen together in a map.

There are 30 properties and districts listed on the National Register in the county.

Contents: Counties in Maryland
Allegany - Anne Arundel - Baltimore (city) - Baltimore County - Calvert - Caroline - Carroll - Cecil - Charles - Dorchester - Frederick - Garrett - Harford - Howard - Kent - Montgomery - Prince George's - Queen Anne's - Somerset - St. Mary's - Talbot - Washington - Wicomico - Worcester

This National Park Service list is complete through NPS recent listings posted February 20, 2026.

== Current listings ==
	Name on the Register	Image	Date listed	Location	City or town	Description
1	Bethlehem Methodist Episcopal Church	Bethlehem Methodist Episcopal Church	June 7, 1979 (#79001126)	Hoopers Neck Rd. 38°28′56″N 76°18′58″W	Taylors Island	
2	Brinsfield I Site	Brinsfield I Site	May 12, 1975 (#75000887)	Address Restricted	Cambridge	
3	Cambridge Historic District, Wards I and III	Cambridge Historic District, Wards I and III	September 5, 1990 (#90001370)	Roughly bounded by Glasgow, Glenburn, Poplar, Race, and Gay Sts. and the Choptank River; 38°34′39″N 76°04′45″W	Cambridge	
4	Christ Episcopal Church and Cemetery	Christ Episcopal Church and Cemetery	April 12, 1984 (#84001767)	High St. 38°34′19″N 76°04′36″W	Cambridge	
5	Dale's Right	Dale's Right	April 3, 1979 (#79001125)	South of Cambridge on Casson Neck Rd. 38°32′59″N 76°15′05″W	Cambridge	
6	Delaware Boundary Markers		February 18, 1975 (#75002101)	Boundary line dividing Delaware from Maryland and Pennsylvania	Multiple	Extends into Delaware and southeastern Pennsylvania.
7	Dorchester County Courthouse and Jail	Dorchester County Courthouse and Jail	December 16, 1982 (#82001591)	206 High St. 38°34′18″N 76°04′34″W	Cambridge	
8	East New Market Historic District	East New Market Historic District	October 1, 1975 (#75000889)	Maryland Routes 14 and 16; 38°35′53″N 75°55′25″W	East New Market	
9	K. B. Fletcher Mill	K. B. Fletcher Mill	December 14, 1978 (#78001456)	Address Restricted	East New Market	
10	Friendship Hall	Friendship Hall	October 18, 1973 (#73000915)	Off Maryland Route 14; 38°35′41″N 75°55′28″W	East New Market	
11	Glasgow	Glasgow	October 8, 1976 (#76000991)	1500 Hambrooks Boulevard; 38°34′58″N 76°05′08″W	Cambridge	
12	Glen Oak Hotel	Glen Oak Hotel	September 8, 1983 (#83002947)	201 Academy St. 38°38′07″N 75°51′54″W	Hurlock	
13	Goldsborough House	Goldsborough House	December 29, 1988 (#88003062)	200 High St. 38°34′21″N 76°04′33″W	Cambridge	
14	Grace Episcopal Church Complex	Grace Episcopal Church Complex	July 24, 1979 (#79001127)	Hooper Neck Rd. 38°28′15″N 76°18′32″W	Taylors Island	
15	Handsell	Handsell	March 26, 2008 (#08000216)	4835 Vienna Rhodesdale Rd. 38°30′39″N 75°48′44″W	Vienna	
16	Hooper Island Light Station	Hooper Island Light Station	December 2, 2002 (#02001426)	Approximately 5 miles south of Cove Pt; 38°15′22″N 76°15′00″W	Hoopersville	
17	Hughes A.M.E. Chapel	Hughes A.M.E. Chapel	June 29, 2018 (#100002630)	4201 Maple Dam Rd. 38°27′01″N 76°04′18″W	Cambridge vicinity	
18	LaGrange	LaGrange	January 24, 1980 (#80001809)	904 LaGrange Ave. 38°33′59″N 76°03′36″W	Cambridge	
19	Medicine Hill	Medicine Hill	July 25, 2022 (#100007947)	1130 Hooper's Island Rd. 38°23′51″N 76°13′31″W	Church Creek vicinity	
20	Annie Oakley House	Annie Oakley House	May 7, 1996 (#96000469)	28 Bellevue Ave. 38°35′22″N 76°05′23″W	Cambridge	
21	PATRICIA (log canoe)		September 18, 1985 (#85002246)	903 Roslyn Ave. 38°33′53″N 76°03′41″W	Cambridge	
22	Phillips Packing Company Plant F	Phillips Packing Company Plant F	October 28, 2021 (#100007122)	411A Dorchester Ave. 38°33′44″N 76°04′03″W	Cambridge	
23	Pine Street Neighborhood Historic District	Pine Street Neighborhood Historic District	November 28, 2012 (#12000976)	High, Pine, & Washington Sts. 38°33′58″N 76°04′56″W	Cambridge	
24	Rehoboth	Rehoboth	November 9, 1972 (#72000577)	Western side of Punkum Rd. 38°35′14″N 75°47′48″W	Eldorado	
25	Ridgeton Farm	Ridgeton Farm	October 5, 1977 (#77000694)	Southwest of Taylor Island on Bay Shore Rd. 38°27′39″N 76°18′24″W	Taylors Island	
26	Rock Methodist Episcopal Church	Rock Methodist Episcopal Church	May 28, 2014 (#13000968)	2403 MD 16; 38°32′41″N 76°06′10″W	Cambridge	
27	Stanley Institute	Stanley Institute	September 11, 1975 (#75000888)	South of Cambridge on Maryland Route 16; 38°32′42″N 76°06′27″W	Cambridge	
28	Sycamore Cottage	Sycamore Cottage	March 30, 1988 (#88000231)	417 High St. 38°34′12″N 76°04′46″W	Cambridge	
29	Willin Village Archeological Site	Willin Village Archeological Site	May 12, 1975 (#75000890)	Address Restricted	Eldorado	
30	Yarmouth		March 29, 1978 (#78001455)	Southeast of Cambridge on Bestpitch Ferry Rd. 38°26′12″N 76°00′10″W	Cambridge	

== See also ==
- List of National Historic Landmarks in Maryland
- National Register of Historic Places listings in Maryland
