= Rock Methodist Episcopal Church =

Historic church in Maryland, United States

- U.S. National Register of Historic Places
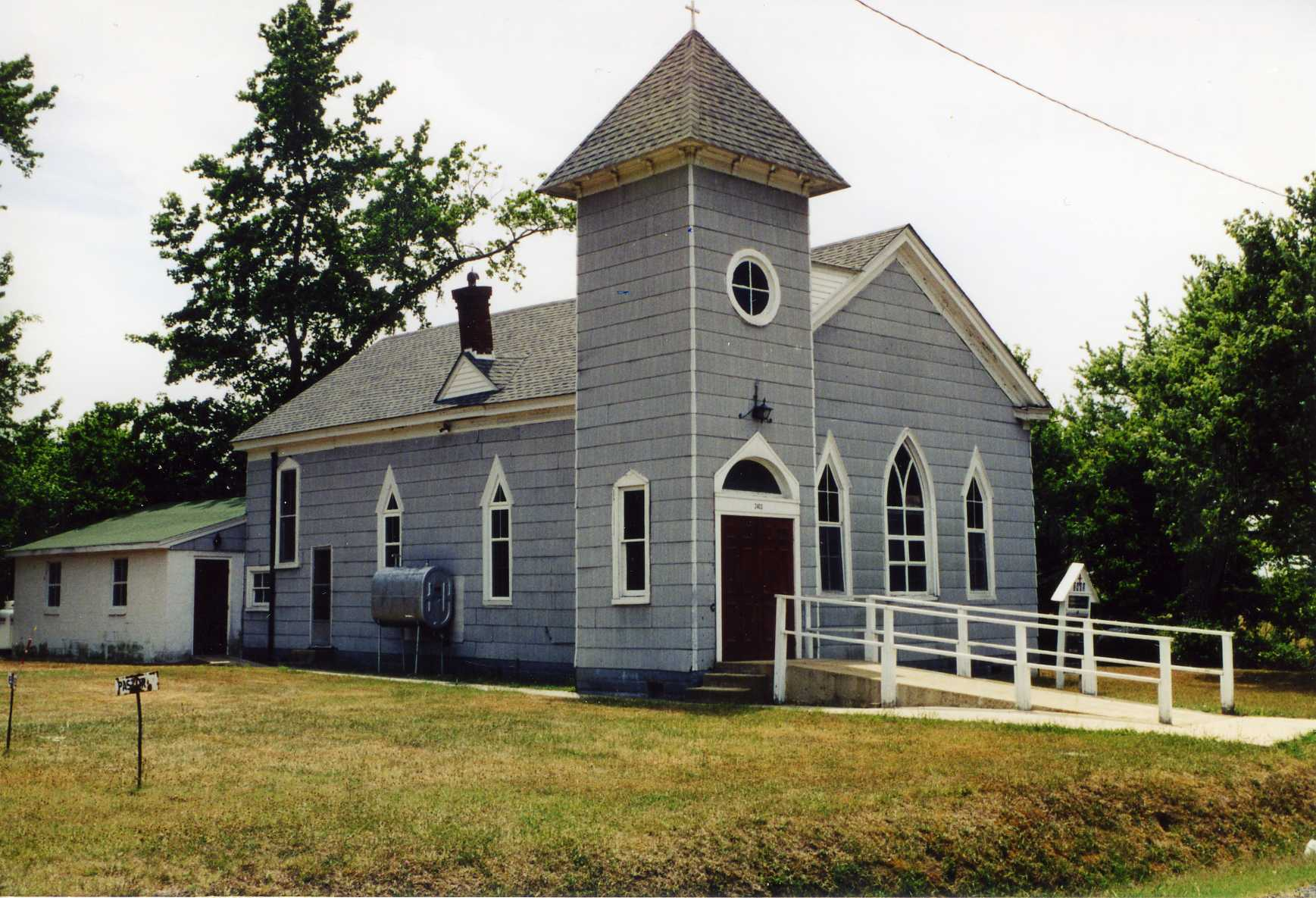
- Christ Rock Methodist Episcopal Church in 2011

- Location within Maryland Location within the United States
- Location: South of Cambridge on Maryland Route 16, near Cambridge, Maryland
- Coordinates: 38.544721°N 76.103063°W
- Area: 1 acre (0.40 ha)
- Built: 1875
- NRHP reference No.: 13000968
- Added to NRHP: May 28, 2014

The Christ Rock Methodist Episcopal Church is a historic church building in Dorchester County, Maryland. It is located across from the Stanley Institute, at the junction of Maryland Route 16 with Rock Drive. The wood-frame building was built in 1875, and rebuilt in 1889 and 1911. The church served a congregation of African Americans who migrated to Dorchester County after the American Civil War.

The church was listed on the National Register of Historic Places in 2014, as "Rock Methodist Episcopal Church".

== See also ==
- National Register of Historic Places listings in Dorchester County, Maryland
