= Victoria Jackson-Stanley =

American politician (born 1953)

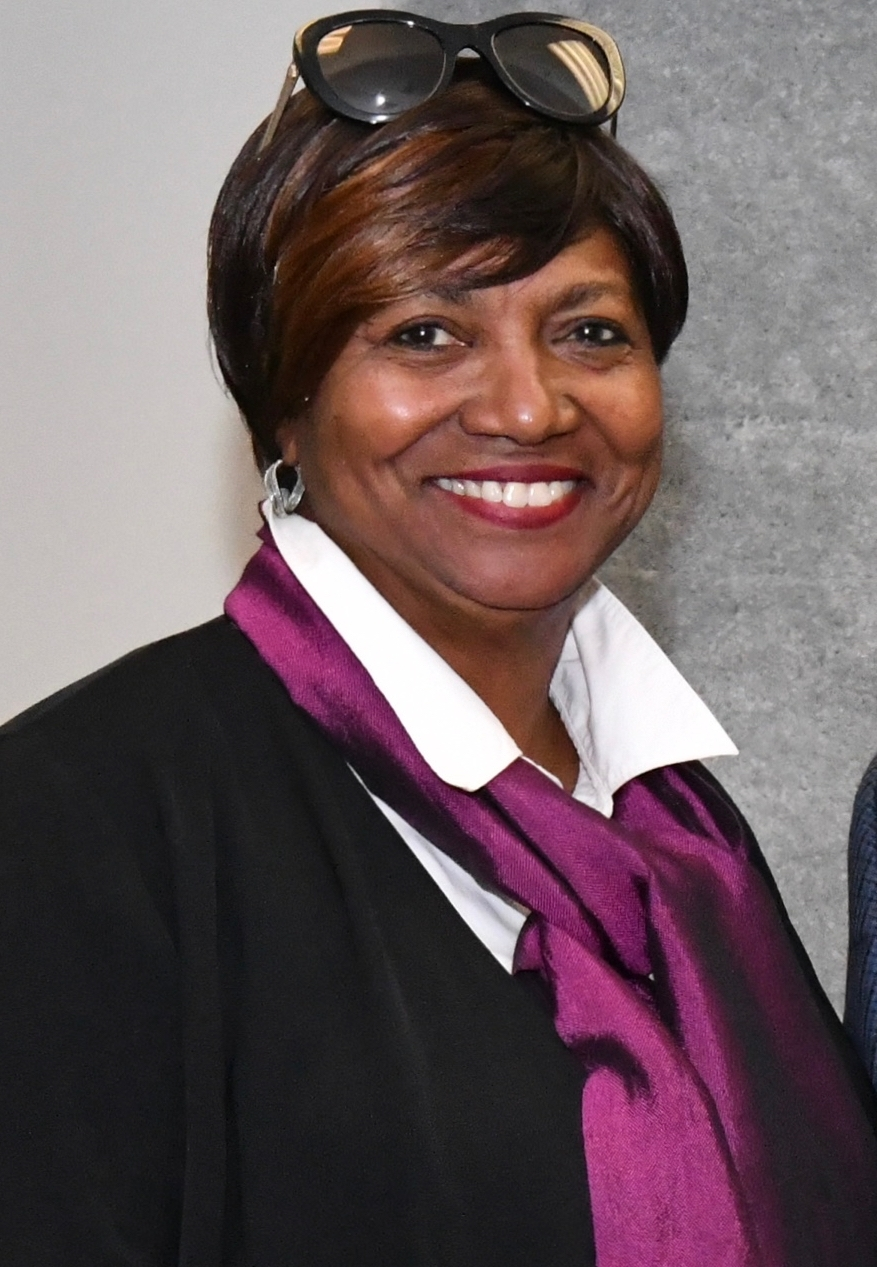
- Jackson-Stanley in 2018

19th Mayor of the City of Cambridge
- In office July 21, 2008 – January 4, 2021
- Preceded by: Cleveland Rippons
- Succeeded by: Andrew Bradshaw

Personal details
- Born: August 20, 1953 (age 72) USA
- Party: Democratic
- Spouse: Jerome Tollifer Stanley
- Children: Ericca Louise Stanley
- Profession: Social worker

Victoria Jackson-Stanley (born August 20, 1953) is an American politician who previously served as mayor of the city of Cambridge, Maryland. She was the first African-American and the first female mayor of Cambridge, Maryland.

== Background ==
Jackson-Stanley was born in and grew up in Cambridge, where blacks attended segregated schools. The town had a history of racial unrest, with race riots making headlines in the 1960s. By the 1970s, the town integrated and she was among the first black students to attend the previously all-white Cambridge High School.
Jackson-Stanley was previously the deputy director of the Dorchester County Department of Social Services. She and her husband, Jerome, live in Cambridge; they have a daughter and a grandson.

== Election ==
On June 10, 2008, in a non-partisan primary election Jackson-Stanley and incumbent Mayor Cleveland Rippons won the right to face each other in the July general election. Rippons received 696 votes, Jackson-Stanley 674 votes and Octavene Saunders finished third with 128 votes. Under Cambridge local election laws, only the top two vote-getters qualify for a run-off general election. Rippons, an eight-year incumbent, was criticized during the campaign for his support of the expansion of development in and around Cambridge. On July 8, 2008, voters chose Jackson-Stanley over Rippons by a 1,383 to 1,231 margin. Although Cambridge is composed equally of black and white residents, neither candidate felt that the other brought up race as an issue. Residents agreed that economic growth and other concerns were more important than gender or race. Jackson-Stanley was sworn in on July 21, 2008. She won a second term in July 2012. Jackson-Stanley served a third term from 2016 to 2020. She was defeated in a runoff election by a 57% to 43% margin in 2020 by local businessman and volunteer firefighter Andrew Bradshaw.

In June 2024, Jackson-Stanley was appointed by Governor Wes Moore to the Maryland State Board of Elections's board of directors to succeed Janet Millenson, who died in April 2024.
