= Yarmouth =

Yarmouth may refer to:

== Places ==
=== Canada ===
- Yarmouth County, Nova Scotia
  - Yarmouth, Nova Scotia
  - Municipality of the District of Yarmouth
  - Yarmouth (provincial electoral district)
  - Yarmouth (electoral district)
- Yarmouth Township, Ontario
- New Yarmouth, Nova Scotia

=== United Kingdom ===
- Great Yarmouth, a town in Norfolk
  - Great Yarmouth (UK Parliament constituency)
  - Borough of Great Yarmouth, a local government district
- Yarmouth, Isle of Wight
  - Yarmouth (Isle of Wight) (UK Parliament constituency) (former UK Parliament constituency)
  - Yarmouth Castle, a fortress guarding Yarmouth harbour

=== United States ===
- Yarmouth, Iowa
- Yarmouth, Maine
  - Yarmouth (CDP), Maine
- North Yarmouth, Maine
- Yarmouth, Massachusetts
  - South Yarmouth, Massachusetts
  - West Yarmouth, Massachusetts
  - Yarmouth Port, Massachusetts

== People ==
- Earl of Yarmouth, British peerage title
- Lord Yarmouth (1777–1842), English amateur cricketer

== Ships ==
- County of Yarmouth, a fully rigged ship
- SS Great Yarmouth (1866), a freight ship built for the Great Eastern Railway
- HMS Yarmouth, various British navy vessels
- SS Yarmouth (1887), a steamship operating Nova Scotia and flagship of the Black Star Line
- SS Yarmouth (1903), a steel-hulled steamship owned by the Great Eastern Railway
- SS Yarmouth (1927), sister of the American steamship Yarmouth Castle
- SS Yarmouth Castle (1927), an American steamship lost in a fire in 1965

== Other ==
- Yarmouth (Cambridge, Maryland), a historic home in Maryland
- Yarmouthian (stage), also called Yarmouth Interglacial
- Yarmouth Toller, a breed of gundog
- "Yarmouth Town", traditional English song about Great Yarmouth.

== See also ==
- Great Yarmouth (disambiguation)
