= Great Yarmouth (disambiguation) =

Great Yarmouth is a town in Norfolk, England.

Great Yarmouth may also refer to:

== Relating to the town ==
- Borough of Great Yarmouth, local government district
- Great Yarmouth (constituency)
- Great Yarmouth First, local affiliate party of Restore Britain
- Great Yarmouth railway station
- Great Yarmouth Town F.C., football club
- Great Yarmouth High School
- Great Yarmouth College
- Great Yarmouth Racecourse, a horse racing course

== Other uses ==
- SS Great Yarmouth (1866), a freight ship built for the Great Eastern Railway

== See also ==
- Yarmouth (disambiguation)
