= Patricia (log canoe) =

- PATRICIA (log canoe)
- U.S. National Register of Historic Places
- Location within Maryland Location within the United States
- Location: 903 Roslyn Ave., Cambridge, Maryland
- Coordinates: 38°33′53″N 76°3′41″W
- Area: less than one acre
- Built: 1942
- Built by: Duke, Oliver
- Architectural style: Tilghman
- MPS: Chesapeake Bay Sailing Log Canoe Fleet TR
- NRHP reference No.: 85002246
- Added to NRHP: September 18, 1985

The Patricia is a Chesapeake Bay log canoe built in 1942 by Oliver Duke. She measures 27'-4" long, and has a beam of 6'-4 3/4". The Patricia has a slightly hollow longhead bow and a sharp stern. Painted white, the canoe races under the no. 19. She is one of twenty-two traditional Chesapeake Bay racing log canoes existing today. The Patricia, and boats like her, carry on a tradition of racing on the Eastern Shore of Maryland that has existed since the 1840s. She is located at Cambridge, Dorchester County, Maryland.

She was listed on the National Register of Historic Places in 1985.

== See also ==
- National Register of Historic Places listings in Dorchester County, Maryland
