= Phillips Packing Company Plant F =

Historic cannery in Maryland, US

- U.S. National Register of Historic Places
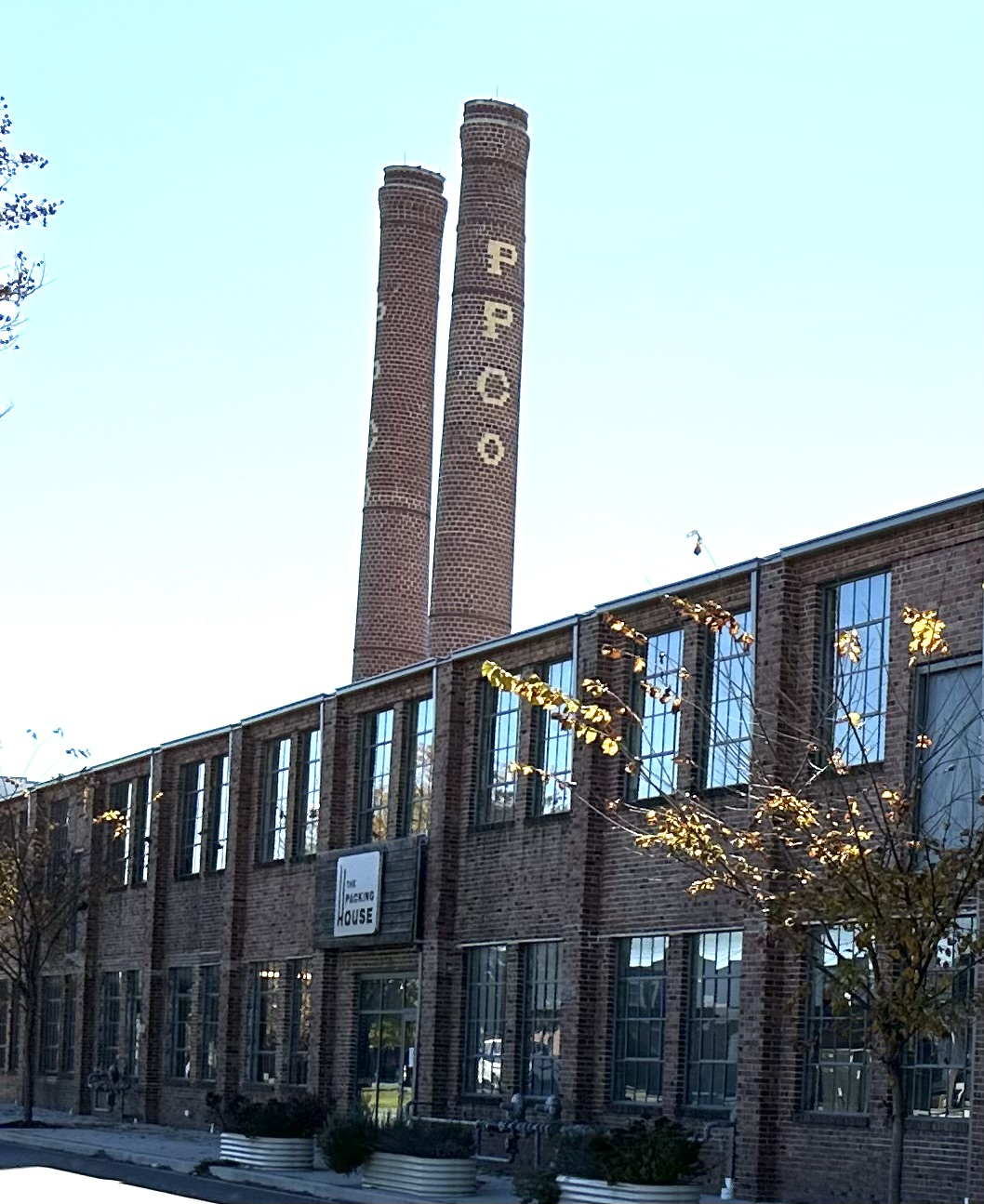
- Phillips Packing Company Plant F, November 2025

- Location within Maryland Location within the United States
- Location: 411A Dorchester Avenue, Cambridge, Maryland
- Coordinates: 38.561296°N 76.067688°W
- Built: ca. 1920-1962
- Built by: T. Milbourne Bramble
- NRHP reference No.: 100007122
- Added to NRHP: October 28, 2021

Phillips Packing Company Plant F is a historic tomato cannery located at Cambridge, Dorchester County, Maryland. The original section was built about 1920 for a furniture company. It is a two-story, trapezoidal-shaped brick structure, with one-story additions. It features two tall, round brick chimneys. The property was purchased by the Phillips Packing Company in 1930, who built a steel-framed, trapezoidal shaped addition and two later steel frame additions with brick exteriors.

It was listed on the National Register of Historic Places in 2021.
