= Glasgow (Cambridge, Maryland) =

Historic house in Maryland, US

- U.S. National Register of Historic Places
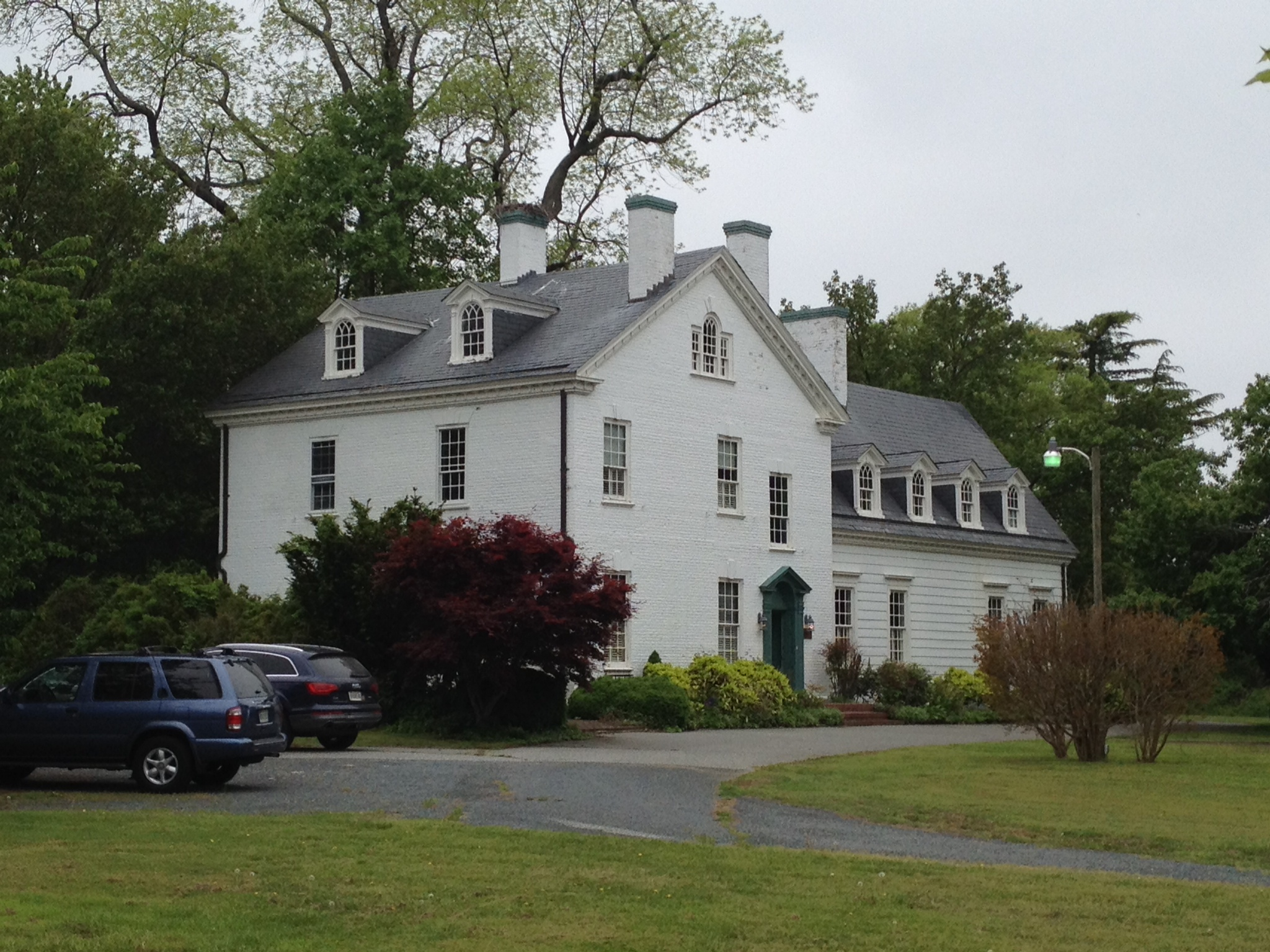

- Location within Maryland Location within the United States
- Location: 1500 Hambrooks Blvd., Cambridge, Maryland
- Coordinates: 38°34′58″N 76°5′8″W
- Built: 1792
- Architectural style: Federal
- NRHP reference No.: 76000991
- Added to NRHP: October 8, 1976

Glasgow is a historic home located at Cambridge, Dorchester County, Maryland. It is a Federal style, gable-front, 2 1/2-story brick house built about 1792. Attached is a 1 1/2-story frame wing dating from the early 20th century. Local history sometimes holds that the home was the birthplace of William Vans Murray, but land records and Murray's biographical data both indicate that it is unlikely that it was ever his home. It is possible, however, that Murray stayed there for some time after his return from his service as U.S. minister to the Netherlands, with his first cousin William Murray Robertson, the owner at the time.

It was listed on the National Register of Historic Places in 1976.
