= K. B. Fletcher Mill =

- U.S. National Register of Historic Places
- Location: Cabin Creek Hurlock Road, Cabin Creek, Maryland
- Built: 1833
- NRHP reference No.: 78001456
- Added to NRHP: December 14, 1978

K. B. Fletcher Mill is a historic grist mill located at East New Market, Dorchester County, Maryland. It was constructed in the 1850s, originally as a two-story, gable-roofed structure. Around 1900 a third floor was added to the main structure and a gable-roofed addition was built. The mill retains a wide variety of milling equipment dating from the 1850s to the early 20th century.

It was listed on the National Register of Historic Places in 1978.
