= Dale's Right =

Historic house in Maryland, US

- U.S. National Register of Historic Places
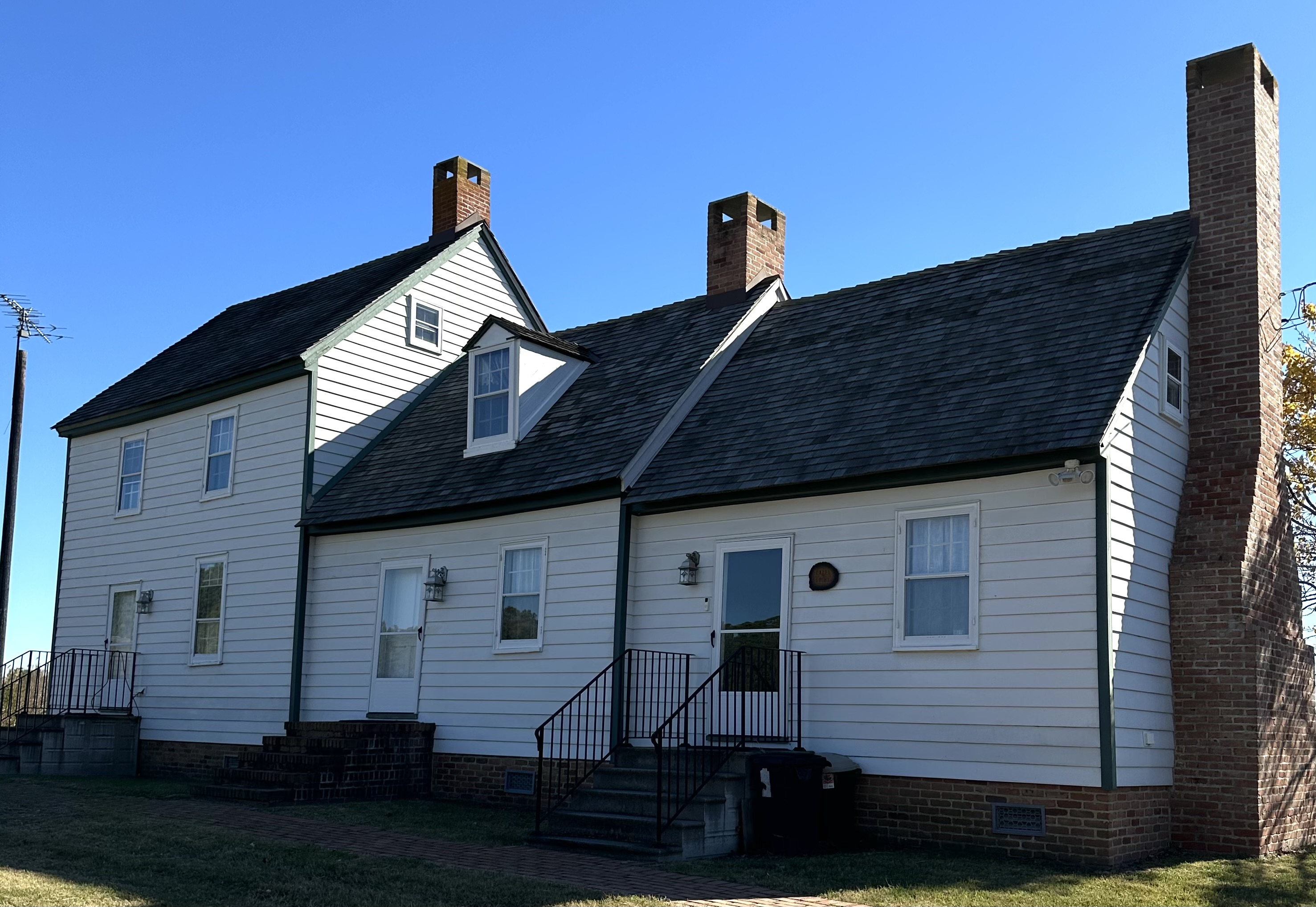
- Dale's Right in 2025

- Location within Maryland Location within the United States
- Location: 5353 Casson Neck Road, near Cambridge, Maryland
- Coordinates: 38°32′59″N 76°15′5″W
- Area: 2 acres (0.81 ha)
- Built: 1835
- Architectural style: "Telescopic"
- NRHP reference No.: 79001125
- Added to NRHP: April 3, 1979

Dale's Right is a historic home located near Cambridge, Dorchester County, Maryland, United States. It is one of the few houses which falls under the strict definition of a telescope house, where each section is narrower and shorter than the previous one. Each of the three sections appears to date from the first third of the 19th century, about 1830 to 1840, and they are two, one and a half, and one stories, respectively.

Dale's Right was listed on the National Register of Historic Places in 1979.
