= Glen Oak Hotel =

- U.S. National Register of Historic Places
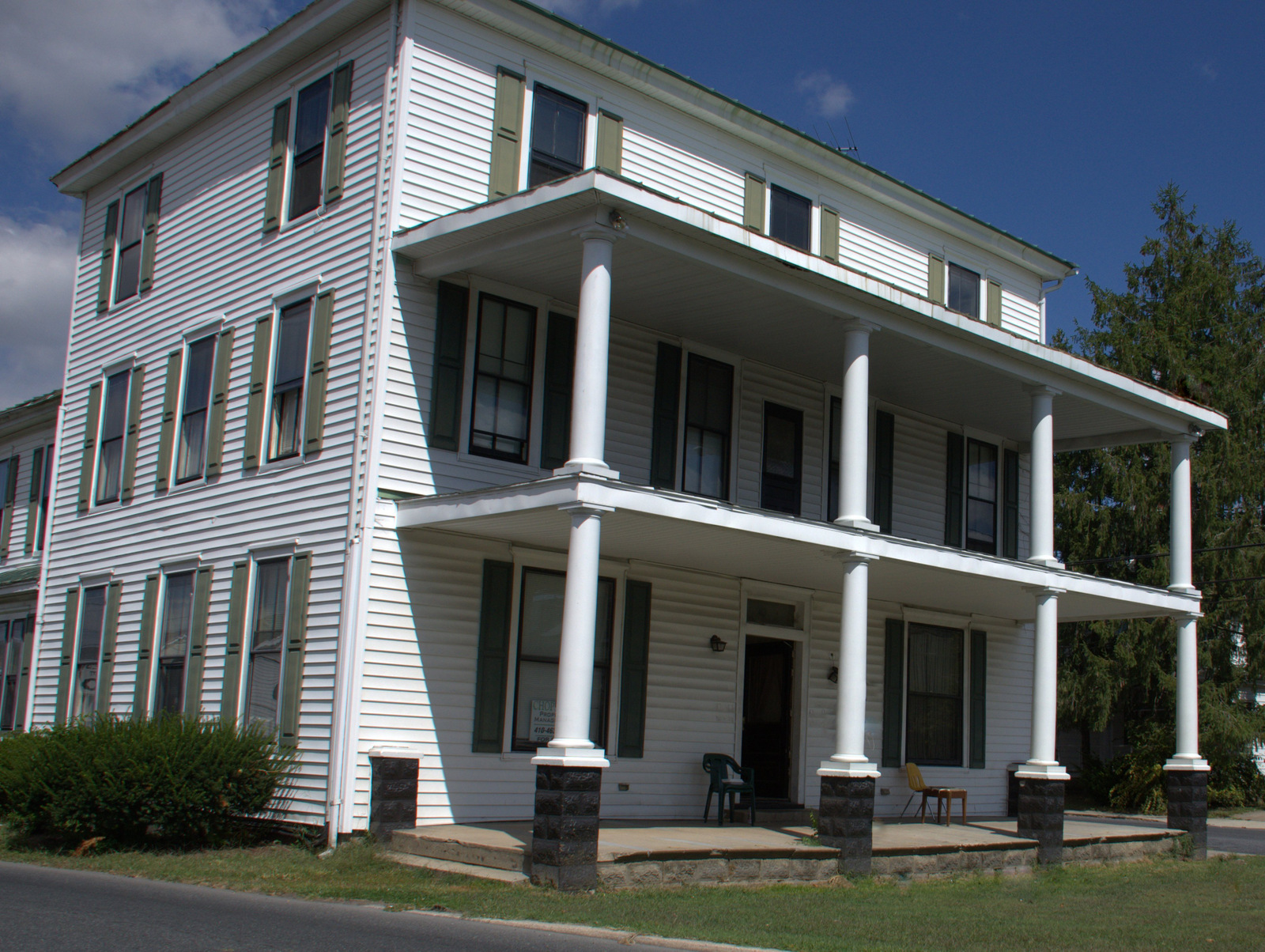

- Location within Maryland Location within the United States
- Location: 201 Academy St., Hurlock, Maryland
- Coordinates: 38°38′7″N 75°51′54″W
- Area: less than one acre
- Built: 1890
- NRHP reference No.: 83002947
- Added to NRHP: September 8, 1983

The Glen Oak Hotel is a historic hotel building located at Hurlock, Dorchester County, Maryland, United States. It is a three-story frame building constructed about 1890. A two-story porch with Tuscan columns spans the south facade. The hotel was one of the first buildings constructed in the town, and functioned as a commercial and social center, serving salesmen who traveled by rail.

The Glen Oak Hotel was listed on the National Register of Historic Places in 1983.
