= Charles Quinn =

American journalist

Charles Nicholas Quinn (July 28, 1930 – July 7, 2013) was an American journalist who reported for NBC News from 1962 until 1980.

Quinn was born in Utica, New York. He received a bachelor's degree from Cornell University in 1951 and his master's degree in journalism from Columbia University in 1954. He served in the U.S. Army as a paratrooper from 1951 to 1953.

In 1962, Quinn became a general assignment television reporter for NBC News. He covered mayor political and social stories of the 1960s, including presidential campaigns, the civil rights movement, along with news film editor Donald Swerdlow. as well as protests against the Vietnam War. Quinn was present at the Ambassador Hotel in Los Angeles, covering United States Senator Robert F. Kennedy's 1968 presidential campaign, on the night he was assassinated. He was one of the first reporters to arrive at the scene of the shooting, telling television viewers, "He's lying here on the floor. Senator Kennedy has been shot. He's been shot...There’s blood on the floor."

Quinn became the Rome bureau chief for NBC News during the early 1970s. He returned to the U.S. later during the 1970s to become NBC's correspondent at the Pentagon. In 1978, he moved to NBC's radio news bureau in Washington, D.C. as a chief correspondent and managing editor.

Quinn left NBC News in 1980. He then joined the now defunct Independent Network News, where he worked as a correspondent for a short time. Quinn was then hired by the American Petroleum Institute for its public relations department, where he remained until his retirement in 1991.

Charles Quinn died of congestive heart failure on July 7, 2013, at his home in Cambridge, Maryland, at the age of 82. He had moved to Cambridge from Alexandria, Virginia, in 2003.
