= Brinsfield I Site =

Archaeological site in Maryland, US

- U.S. National Register of Historic Places
- Nearest city: Cambridge, Maryland
- NRHP reference No.: 75000887
- Added to NRHP: May 12, 1975

Brinsfield I Site, or Brinsfield I Prehistoric Village Site, is an archaeological site near Cambridge in Dorchester County, Maryland. The site was first identified in 1955 by Perry S. Flegel of the Sussex Society of Archaeology & History. It is a late prehistoric archaeological site characterized by shell-tempered pottery and triangular projectile points. The site may provide evidence of prehistoric life on the eastern shore of Maryland during the Late Woodland period, c. 900–1500.

It was listed on the National Register of Historic Places in 1975.
