= Carolyn Long =

American singer

Carolyn Long (June 13, 1915 - October 3, 1991) was an American operatic soprano and concert singer.

She was born as Carolyn Elizabeth Creighton in Cambridge, Maryland. She studied piano as a child, winning a scholarship to study piano at the Peabody Institute in Baltimore in 1932 at the age of 16. Her singing voice soon proved to be a greater gift, however, and she changed to vocal studies two years later. She was said to have made her stage debut in Baltimore while still a student in The Old Maid and the Thief by Gian Carlo Menotti, but this is unlikely as the work premiered in 1939, around the time Long would have been completing her studies at Peabody.

She then enjoyed an active career in the United States for a number of years, with major opera, concert and radio appearances. She sang with the Oscar Strauss Festival and the Community Concerts Association across the USA. She made at least one recording for a major label, Jeanne d'Arc au Bûcher, by Arthur Honegger. This recording, issued in 1953, was made with the Philadelphia Orchestra conducted by Eugene Ormandy. and featured Vera Zorina in the speaking role of Joan of Arc. Private recordings from her personal collection exist, but are generally of extremely poor technical quality. They include at least one live recital and at least one radio broadcast from the International Harvester Hour, in which she sings light classical and popular songs with the International Harvester Orchestra and tenor James Melton. From her operatic appearances one may infer that her voice was a lyrico-spinto soprano. The private recordings bear this out, and also show considerable warmth, personality and humor.

She sang with most of the leading symphony orchestras in the United States. Although she did not appear at the Metropolitan Opera at its home in New York City, she did appear with the Metropolitan Opera National Touring Company in Cincinnati. She also appeared at Carnegie Hall, the Hollywood Bowl, and Chicago's Grant Park. Her appearances included operetta, including Bloomer Girl, and television. Her opera appearances included Tosca (as Tosca), Faust (as Marguerite), The Barber of Seville, Salome, Aida, Rigoletto, Carmen, La traviata, La bohème and Il trovatore. She appeared with such singers as tenor Mario Lanza, bass Ezio Pinza, tenor Nino Martini, and Japanese soprano Hizi Koyke.

Long sang at the White House for President Harry Truman and his vice president, Alben Barkley. In 1954 she was chosen by Rose and Ira Gershwin to be the "Gershwin Girl" for their touring show which also featured the young Lorin Maazel.

She studied singing in Italy as well, from 1954 to 1956. While in Europe, she appeared in the first English language opera production to occur in Spain since Francisco Franco's accession to power in the Spanish Civil War.

== Later years ==
Health and personal problems may have contributed to a relatively early end to her career. Her later years were spent as a private voice teacher in Bethesda, Maryland, where she lived with her lifelong friend and companion, Carolyn "Bobby" Drury. She also taught voice at American University and the Prince George's Community College, in Maryland. She spent her final years in a nursing home in her home town of Cambridge, Maryland, where she died. She is buried at Dorchester Memorial Park in Cambridge, Md alongside her friend Carolyn "Bobby" Drury. She was married, at Christ Episcopal Church in Cambridge, Maryland on June 27, 1937 (her parents' wedding anniversary) to Hugh-Blair Grigsby Long of Charlottesville, Virginia. The marriage ended in divorce.

== Awards ==
She received the Director's Recognition Award from the Peabody Institute on June 8, 1988.
