= LaGrange (Cambridge, Maryland) =

Historic house in Maryland, US

- U.S. National Register of Historic Places
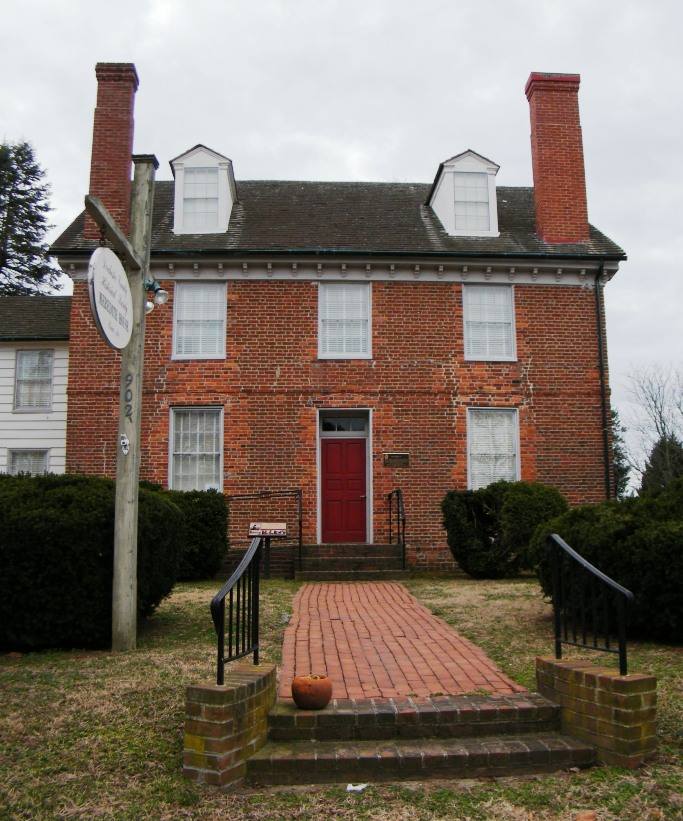
- Meredith House, March 2011

- Location within Maryland Location within the United States
- Location: 904 LaGrange Ave., Cambridge, Maryland
- Coordinates: 38°33′59″N 76°3′36″W
- Area: 1.5 acres (0.61 ha)
- Built: 1760
- Architectural style: Georgian
- NRHP reference No.: 80001809
- Added to NRHP: January 24, 1980

LaGrange, also known as La Grange Plantation or Meredith House, is a historic home located at Cambridge, Dorchester County, Maryland, United States. It was built about 1760. The house is a 2 1/2-story Flemish bond brick house and is one of the few remaining Georgian houses in the town. Sun porches and a frame wing were added to the main house in the late 19th and early 20th centuries. Three outbuildings remain, including a late 19th-century dairy, an 18th-century smokehouse, and a 20th-century garage.

LaGrange was listed on the National Register of Historic Places in 1980.

== La Grange Plantation ==
The Dorchester County Historical Society owns the La Grange Plantation and operates it as an open museum of local history. The different buildings include the 1760 period furnished Meredith House, exhibits on local history, agriculture, domestic life, antique transportation vehicles, and tools used by a woodworker, wheelwright and blacksmith.
