= Goldsborough House =

Historic house in Maryland, US

- U.S. National Register of Historic Places
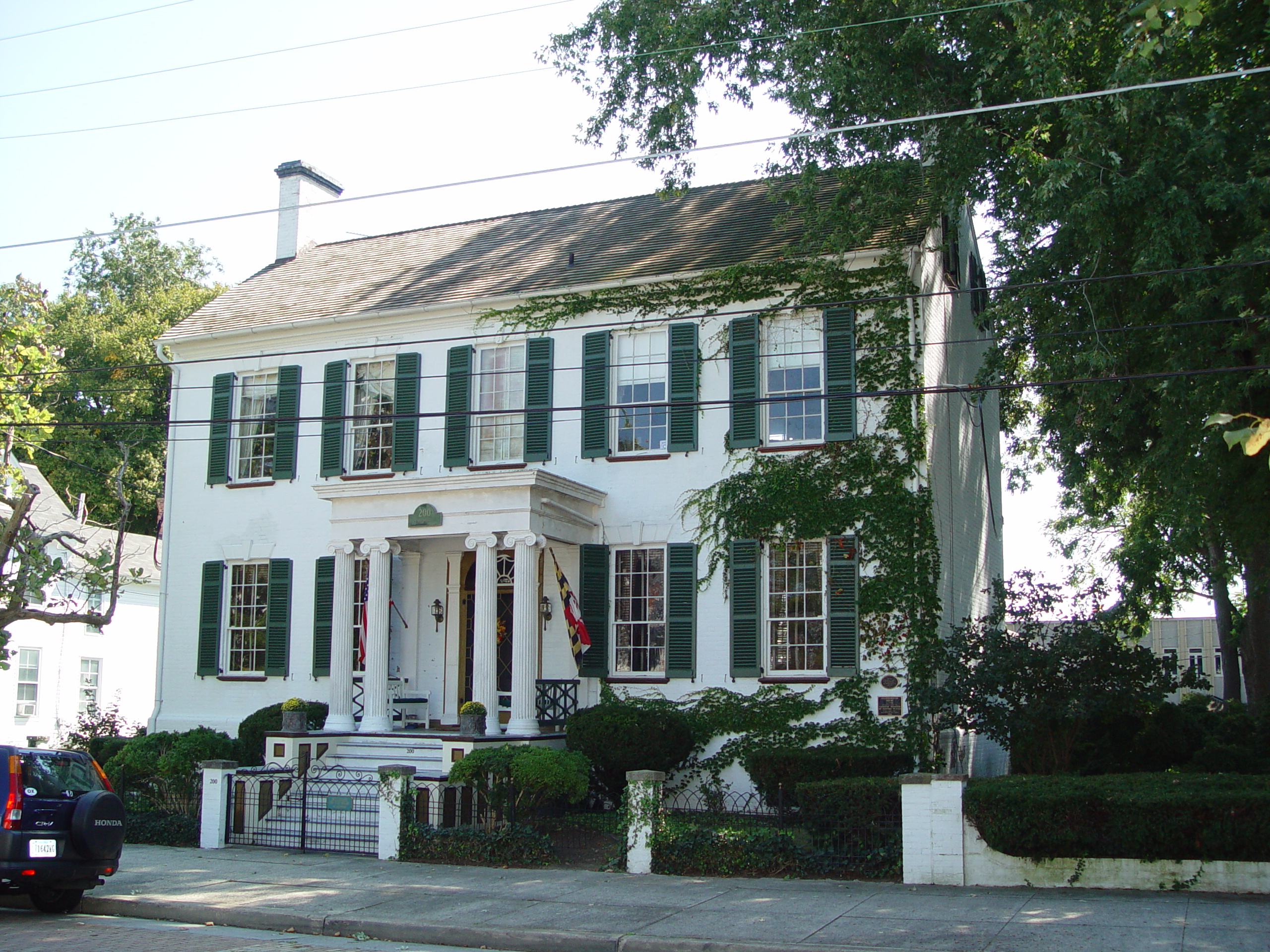

- Location within Maryland Location within the United States
- Location: 200 High St., Cambridge, Maryland
- Coordinates: 38°34′21″N 76°4′33″W
- Area: 0.5 acres (0.20 ha)
- Built: 1793
- Architectural style: Federal
- NRHP reference No.: 88003062
- Added to NRHP: December 29, 1988

The Goldsborough House is a historic home located at Cambridge, Dorchester County, Maryland, United States. It is a two-and-a-half-story painted brick Federal-style house with a five-bay symmetrical facade, built in about 1793. The house features an Ionic columned entrance portico.

The Goldsborough House was listed on the National Register of Historic Places in 1988.
