= J. Webb Thomas =

American politician (1873–1941)

- Thomas in a 1905 newspaper

Member of the Maryland Senate from the Baltimore's 4th district
- In office 1904 – April 8, 1905
- Preceded by: District established
- Succeeded by: Charles W. Jones

Personal details
- Born: John Webb Thomas; March 5, 1873 Dorchester County, Maryland, U.S.
- Died: January 30, 1941 (aged 67) Baltimore, Maryland, U.S.
- Resting place: Parkview Cemetery
- Party: Republican
- Spouse: Mary Elizabeth Phebus (m. 1903)
- Children: 1
- Occupation: Politician; contractor; businessman

John Webb Thomas (March 5, 1873 – January 30, 1941) was an American politician from Maryland. He served in the Maryland Senate from 1904 to 1905. He then served on the Board of Supervisors of Elections in Baltimore.

== Early life ==
John Webb Thomas was born on March 5, 1873, in Dorchester County, Maryland, to Nancy Elizabeth and John W. Thomas.

== Career ==
Thomas was an apprentice in carpentry. He was a contractor and builder and the superintendent of the real estate department of the Maryland Steel Company (later Bethlehem Steel Company).

Thomas was the Republican State Central Committee executive of the 24th ward. He served as a Republican in the Maryland Senate from 1904 to 1905. He was the first to represent Baltimore's 4th district. He was a clerk in the Board of Supervisors of Elections in Baltimore. He was appointed by Governor Edwin Warfield to the Board of Supervisors of Elections for Baltimore on April 6, 1905. He resigned from the senate on April 8, 1905, to accept the appointment and took office the same day.

== Personal life ==
In February 1903, his foot was run over at the Maryland Steel Company in Sparrows Point by a hopper car and his right leg was amputated.

On April 22, 1903, Thomas married Mary Elizabeth Phebus, daughter of Mrs. Katherine Markley. They had one son, J. Owen. He lived on William Street in Baltimore, before later living on Light Street in Baltimore. He was a member of the Methodist Union League, the Masonic Order, and the Maryland Motor Boat Club.

Thomas died of a heart attack on January 30, 1941, at his home at Lawnview Avenue in Baltimore. He was buried at Parkwood Cemetery.
