= Medicine Hill (Dorchester County, Maryland) =

- U.S. National Register of Historic Places
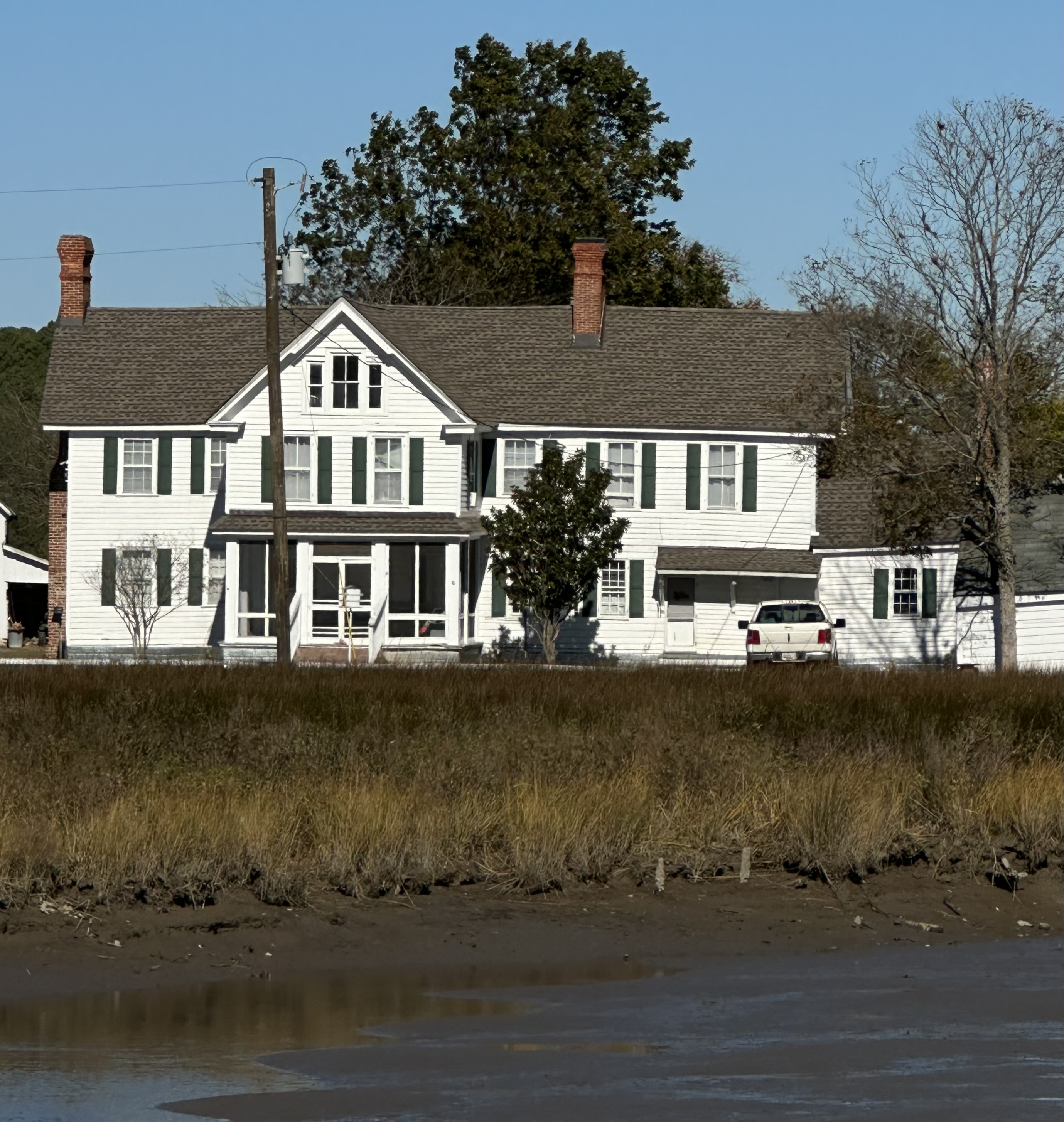
- Medicine Hill, November 2025

- Location within Maryland Location within the United States
- Location: 1130 Hooper Island Road (MD 355), near Church Creek, Maryland
- Coordinates: 38°23′51″N 76°13′31″W
- Built: ca. 1790-1930
- Architectural style: Federal
- NRHP reference No.: 100007947
- Added to NRHP: July 25, 2022

Medicine Hill is a historic home and farm complex located near Church Creek, Dorchester County, Maryland. The plantation house was built between about 1810 and 1830, and is a two-story Federal period frame dwelling. Also on the property is an assemblage of vernacular domestic and agricultural buildings.

It was listed on the National Register of Historic Places in 2022.
