= Elliott, Maryland =

- Census-designated place
- Location in Maryland Elliott (the United States)
- Coordinates: 38°18′36″N 75°59′47″W
- Country: United States
- State: Maryland
- County: Dorchester

Area
  - Total: 0.36 sq mi (0.92 km^{2})
  - Land: 0.35 sq mi (0.91 km^{2})
  - Water: 0.0039 sq mi (0.01 km^{2})
- Elevation: 4 ft (1.2 m)

Population (2020)
  - Total: 38
  - Density: 122.5/sq mi (47.31/km^{2})
- Time zone: UTC−5 (Eastern (EST))
  - Summer (DST): UTC−4 (EDT)
- ZIP code: 21869
- Area codes: 410, 443, and 667
- FIPS code: 24-26026
- GNIS feature ID: 590196

Elliott is an unincorporated community and census-designated place (CDP) in Dorchester County, Maryland, United States. The population was 38 at the 2020 census. It is located at Elliott Island near Blackwater National Wildlife Refuge. The only road connecting Elliott to the rest of Maryland is Elliott Island Scenic Rd.

== Geography ==
Elliott is located in southern Dorchester County on Elliott Island, on the east side of Fishing Bay. Elliott Island Road is the only road access to the town, leading 19 miles (31 km) northeast to U.S. Route 50 at Vienna.

According to the United States Census Bureau, the Elliott CDP has a total area of 0.36 square miles (0.92 km^{2}), of which 73,250 square feet (6,805 m^{2}), or 0.74%, is water.

== Demographics ==
Historical population
Census	Pop.	Note	%±
2020	43		—
U.S. Decennial Census
