= Cambridge, Maryland =

- City
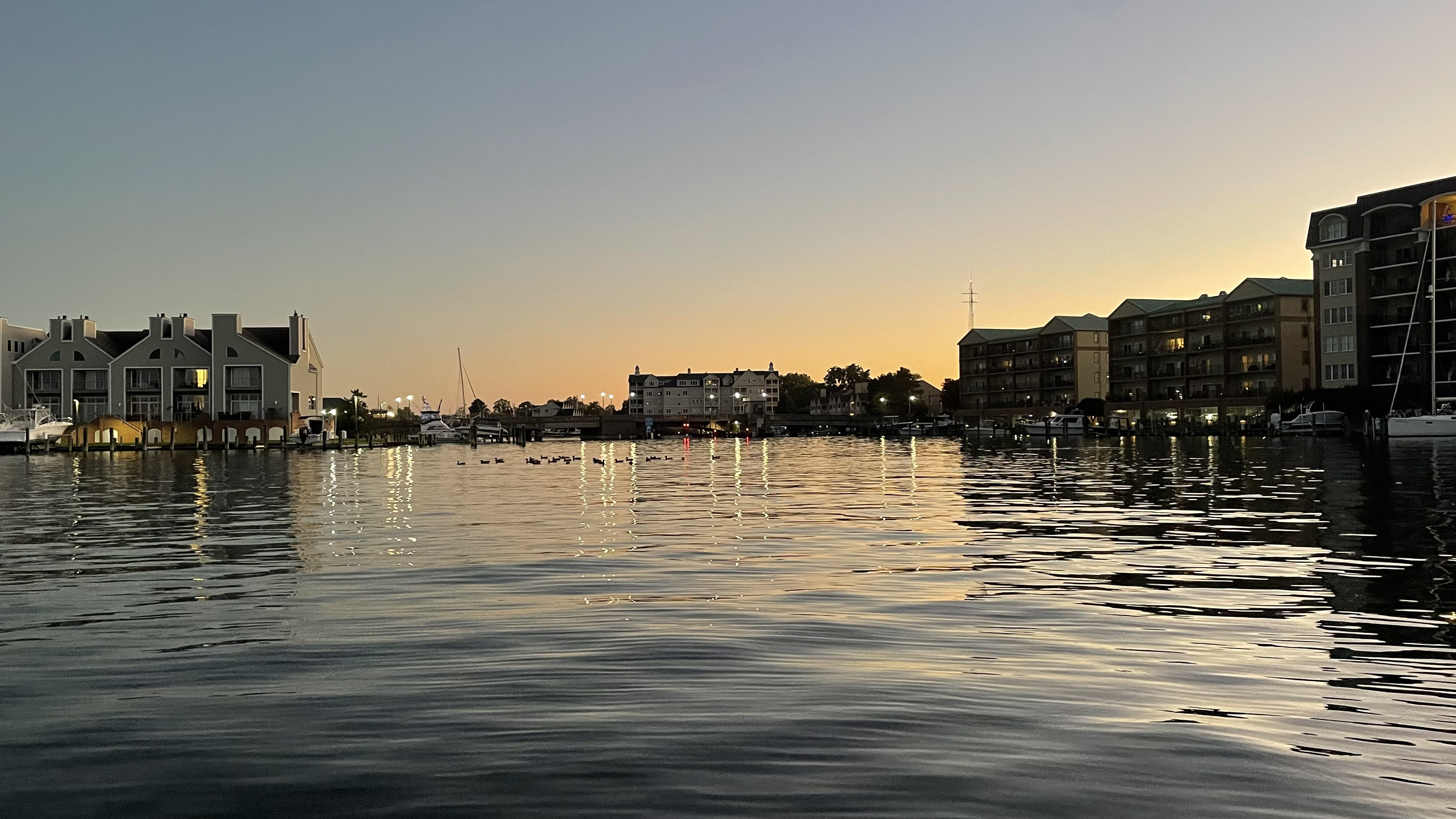
- Cambridge Creek at sunset

- Flag Seal
- Motto: "Living, Working, Relaxing...And Loving It"
- Location in Dorchester County and the State of Maryland

- Location within the U.S. state of Maryland Cambridge (the United States)
- Coordinates: 38°33′59″N 76°4′37″W
- Country: United States
- State: Maryland
- County: Dorchester
- Incorporated: 1793

Government
  - Mayor: Lajan Cephas Bey

Area
  - Total: 12.95 sq mi (33.53 km^{2})
  - Land: 10.65 sq mi (27.58 km^{2})
  - Water: 2.30 sq mi (5.96 km^{2})
- Elevation: 20 ft (6 m)

Population (2020)
  - Total: 13,096
  - Density: 1,230/sq mi (474.9/km^{2})
- Time zone: UTC−5 (Eastern (EST))
  - Summer (DST): UTC−4 (EDT)
- ZIP code: 21613
- Area code: 410
- FIPS code: 24-12400
- GNIS feature ID: 0589879
- Website: www.choosecambridge.com

Cambridge is a city in Dorchester County, Maryland, United States. The population was 13,096 at the 2020 census. It is the county seat of Dorchester County and the county's largest municipality. Cambridge is the fourth most populous city in Maryland's Eastern Shore region, after Salisbury, Elkton and Easton.

== History ==
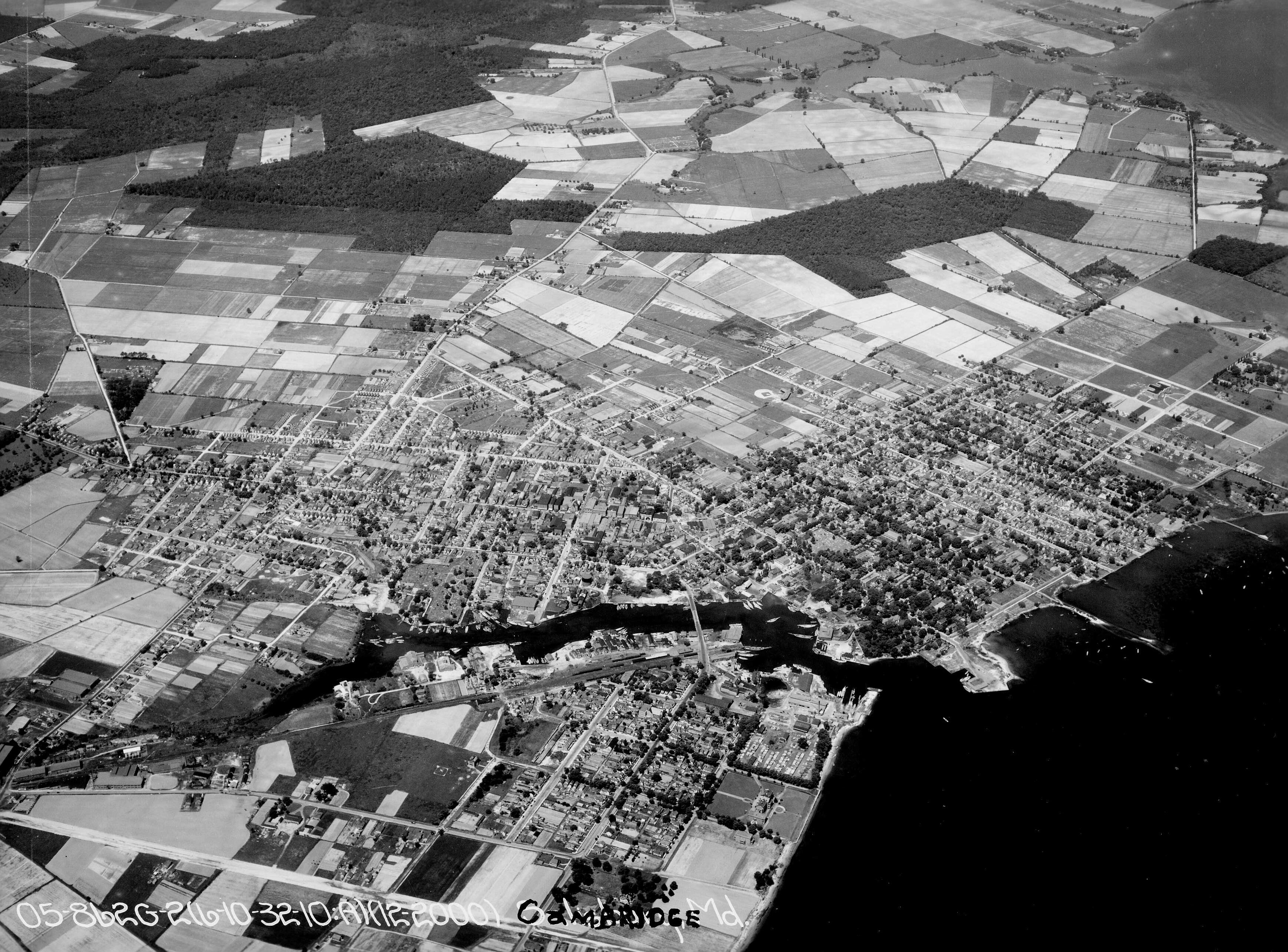
Aerial view, 1932

=== Colonial era ===
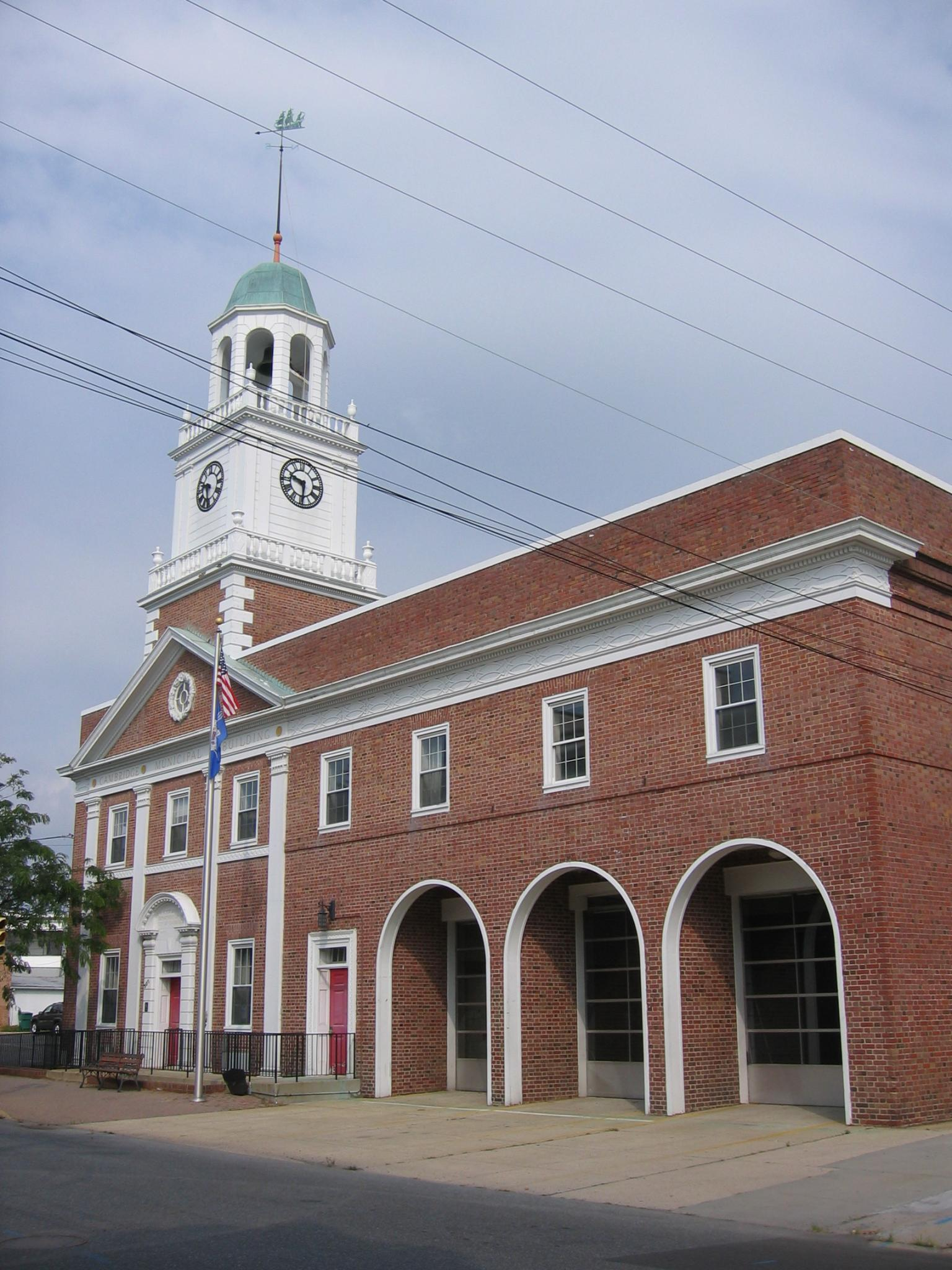
Rescue Fire Company Train Garden

Settled by English colonists in 1684, Cambridge is one of the oldest colonial cities in Maryland. During the time of English colonization, the Algonquian-speaking Choptank Indians resided along the river bearing their name. Throughout the colonial years, English colonists developed farming on the Eastern Shore, with the largest plantations initially focusing on tobacco, before shifting to mixed farming. Cambridge served as a regional trading center, with its town pier being a major hub. Its history is extensively documented by historical markers scattered throughout the town center.

=== National era ===
Cambridge was officially incorporated in 1793, taking over part of the former Choptank Indian Reservation. The town received its name from a city and county in England. Cambridge also became a stop on the Underground Railroad, which provided a network of safe houses for enslaved people escaping to the north.

In the late 19th century, Cambridge developed food processing industries, specializing in the canning of oysters, tomatoes, and sweet potatoes. The town's industrial growth was led by the Phillips Packing Company, which eventually became the region's largest employer. Winning contracts from the Department of Defense during the First and Second World Wars greatly aided the company's growth. At its height, the company employed as many as 10,000 workers. However, shifting tastes brought a decline in business, causing Phillips to reduce its operations. By the early 1960s, the company had ceased operations entirely, leading to widespread unemployment and exacerbating the city's growing social issues.

=== Cambridge movement ===
From 1962 to 1967, Cambridge was a center of protests during the Civil Rights Movement, with local Black residents advocating for equal employment and housing opportunities, as well as the eradication of racial segregation in schools and other public facilities. Riots broke out in Cambridge in 1963 and 1967, prompting the deployment of the Maryland National Guard to the city to help maintain peace. The movement's leader was Gloria Richardson, and with the enactment of the Civil Rights Act of 1964, public segregation in Cambridge officially ended.

=== Present ===
In 2002, the opening of the 400-room Hyatt Regency Chesapeake Bay resort provided a significant boost to the city's economy through job creation and tourism. The resort features a golf course, spa, and marina, and has hosted numerous high-profile events, including the 2007 U.S. House Republican Conference, featuring an address by U.S. President George W. Bush, as well as subsequent visits by U.S. President Barack Obama.

Cambridge was designated a Maryland Main Street community on July 1, 2003. The Maryland Department of Housing and Community Development established Cambridge Main Street as a comprehensive downtown revitalization process with plans to enhance the economic potential of select cities across the state. This initiative has led to the improvement of heritage tourism attractions and, along with other cities on the Eastern Shore, has contributed to attracting more tourists to Cambridge. As a result, the downtown business district of Cambridge, part of which was declared a historic district in 1990, has undergone revitalization.

Four different teams in the old Eastern Shore Baseball League—the Canners, Cardinals, Clippers, and Dodgers—were located in Cambridge.

The Brinsfield I Site, Cambridge Historic District, Wards I and III, Christ Episcopal Church and Cemetery, Dale's Right, Dorchester County Courthouse and Jail, Glasgow, Goldsborough House, LaGrange, Annie Oakley House, Patricia (log canoe), Pine Street Neighborhood Historic District, Rock Methodist Episcopal Church, Stanley Institute, Sycamore Cottage, and Yarmouth are listed on the National Register of Historic Places.

== Geography ==
Cambridge is located at 38°33′59″N 76°4′37″W.

According to the United States Census Bureau, the city has a total area of 12.64 square miles (32.74 km^{2}), of which, 10.34 square miles (26.78 km^{2}) is land and 2.30 square miles (5.96 km^{2}) is water.

Cambridge is on the southern bank of the Choptank River.

=== Climate and climate mitigation ===
The climate in this area is characterized by hot, humid summers and generally mild to cool winters. According to the Köppen climate classification system, Cambridge has a humid subtropical climate, abbreviated "Cfa" on climate maps.

A 4.3 MW solar farm in Cambridge supplies about 40% of the power for the National Aquarium, and saves about 1,300 metric tons of carbon dioxide during the summer.

== Most Known for ==
Cambridge is best known for its location on Maryland's Eastern Shore and its seafood industry. During World War II, Cambridge also contributed to the U.S. war effort through Cambridge Shipbuilders, which built aircraft rescue boats, crash boats, T-boats, and freight and passenger vessels for the U.S. Army.

== Demographics ==
Historical population
Census	Pop.	Note	%±
1860	1,862		—
1870	1,642		−11.8%
1880	2,262		37.8%
1890	4,192		85.3%
1900	5,747		37.1%
1910	6,407		11.5%
1920	7,467		16.5%
1930	8,544		14.4%
1940	10,102		18.2%
1950	10,351		2.5%
1960	12,239		18.2%
1970	11,595		−5.3%
1980	11,703		0.9%
1990	11,514		−1.6%
2000	10,911		−5.2%
2010	12,326		13.0%
2020	13,096		6.2%
U.S. Decennial Census; 2010 2020

=== Racial and ethnic composition ===
Cambridge city, Maryland - Demographic Profile (NH = Non-Hispanic)
Race / Ethnicity	Pop 2010	Pop 2020	% 2010	% 2020
White alone (NH)	5,419	5,001	43.96%	38.19%
Black or African American alone (NH)	5,814	6,208	47.17%	47.40%
Native American or Alaska Native alone (NH)	33	26	0.27%	0.20%
Asian alone (NH)	162	192	1.31%	1.47%
Pacific Islander alone (NH)	4	2	0.03%	0.02%
Some Other Race alone (NH)	19	66	0.15%	0.50%
Mixed Race/Multi-Racial (NH)	265	558	2.15%	4.26%
Hispanic or Latino (any race)	610	1,043	4.95%	7.96%
Total	12,326	13,096	100.00%	100.00%

Note: the US Census treats Hispanic/Latino as an ethnic category. This table excludes Latinos from the racial categories and assigns them to a separate category. Hispanics/Latinos can be of any race.

=== 2020 census ===
As of the 2020 census, Cambridge had a population of 13,096. The median age was 39.5 years. 23.9% of residents were under the age of 18 and 19.4% of residents were 65 years of age or older. For every 100 females there were 86.0 males, and for every 100 females age 18 and over there were 80.8 males age 18 and over.

97.8% of residents lived in urban areas, while 2.2% lived in rural areas.

There were 5,564 households in Cambridge, of which 30.1% had children under the age of 18 living in them. Of all households, 27.0% were married-couple households, 20.2% were households with a male householder and no spouse or partner present, and 43.9% were households with a female householder and no spouse or partner present. About 35.2% of all households were made up of individuals and 14.8% had someone living alone who was 65 years of age or older.

There were 6,464 housing units, of which 13.9% were vacant. The homeowner vacancy rate was 4.1% and the rental vacancy rate was 6.9%.

=== 2010 census ===
As of the census of 2010, there were 12,326 people, 5,144 households, and 3,040 families residing in the city. The population density was 1,192.1 inhabitants per square mile (460.3/km^{2}). There were 6,228 housing units at an average density of 602.3 per square mile (232.5/km^{2}). The racial makeup of the city was 47.9% Black or African American, 45.9% White, 0.4% Native American, 1.3% Asian, 2.0% from other races, and 2.5% from two or more races. Hispanic or Latino of any race were 4.9% of the population.

There were 5,144 households, of which 31.1% had children under the age of 18 living with them, 30.0% were married couples living together, 24.0% had a female householder with no husband present, 5.1% had a male householder with no wife present, and 40.9% were non-families. 34.1% of all households were made up of individuals, and 12.8% had someone living alone who was 65 years of age or older. The average household size was 2.31 and the average family size was 2.93.

The median age in the city was 37.6 years. 24.5% of residents were under the age of 18; 9.6% were between the ages of 18 and 24; 24.9% were from 25 to 44; 25.6% were from 45 to 64; and 15.4% were 65 years of age or older. The gender makeup of the city was 45.8% male and 54.2% female.

=== 2000 census ===
As of the census of 2000, there were 10,911 people, 4,629 households, and 2,697 families residing in the city. The population density was 1,622.3 inhabitants per square mile (626.4/km^{2}). There were 4,629 housing units at an average density of 777.6 per square mile (300.2/km^{2}). The racial makeup of the city was 47.75% White, 49.9% Black, 0.16% Native American, 0.65% Asian, 0.01% Pacific Islander, 0.61% from other races, and 0.87% from two or more races. Hispanic or Latino of any race were 1.44% of the population.

There were 4,629 households, out of which 27.2% had children under the age of 18 living with them, 30.7% were married couples living together, 23.1% had a female householder with no husband present, and 41.7% were non-families. 36.1% of all households were made up of individuals, and 16.7% had someone living alone who was 65 years of age or older. The average household size was 2.23 and the average family size was 2.88.

In the city, the age distribution of the population shows 24.4% under the age of 18, 7.9% from 18 to 24, 26.6% from 25 to 44, 22.3% from 45 to 64, and 18.7% who were 65 years of age or older. The median age was 39 years. For every 100 females, there were 84.2 males. For every 100 females age 18 and over, there were 78.9 males.

The median income for a household in the city was $25,967, and the median income for a family was $32,118. Males had a median income of $25,705 versus $21,221 for females. The per capita income for the city was $15,647. About 17.2% of families and 20.3% of the population were below the poverty line, including 25.0% of those under age 18 and 18.6% of those age 65 or over.

== Media ==
Draper Media broadcasts WCEM (AM), WCEM-FM, WTDK-FM and WAAI-FM radio stations from studios at Cambridge Marketplace. This facility also serves as the home to the Mid-Shore Bureau for WBOC-TV. Weeknights, they cover news affecting Cambridge and surrounding communities.

WHCP-LP 101.5 FM is a community sponsored low powered station broadcasting from studios in downtown Cambridge.

Cambridge is home to two weekly newspapers: the Dorchester Star, which is affiliated with the Star-Democrat, and the Dorchester Banner. The Dorchester Banner was founded by Lindsay C. Marshall and Armistead R. Michie as The Daily Banner, notable for being the Eastern Shore's first daily newspaper. The first issue was published on September 22, 1897.

== Infrastructure ==
=== Transportation ===
U.S. Route 50, a major east-west route of the U.S. Highway System, bisects Cambridge on its 3,019 mi (4,859 km) journey from Ocean City, Maryland to Sacramento, California. U.S. 50 is locally known as "Ocean Gateway", with the segment running from the Choptank River to Cambridge's eastern city limit designated "Sunburst Highway".

The Cambridge-Dorchester Airport (FAA Identifier: CGE) is a county-owned, public-use airport located just southeast of the city of Cambridge. The airport is a general aviation facility with a lighted 4,477-foot asphalt runway.

The Maryland & Delaware Railroad (MDDE), a shortline railroad, provided freight rail service to Cambridge until recently. The city had served as the western terminus of the railroad's Seaford Line. The Maryland & Delaware interchanges with the Delmarva Central Railroad at Seaford, Delaware, which interchanges with the Norfolk Southern Railway at Clayton, Delaware. The line remains in place, though rail service was suspended in May 2016 due to derailment issues along the line south of Hurlock, Maryland.

=== Schools ===
The Dorchester County Public Schools includes the Cambridge-South Dorchester High School.

== Government ==
=== City Commission ===
Cambridge is governed by a mayor and a five-member city commission, who all serve four-year terms.

In 2008, Victoria Jackson-Stanley was elected mayor, the first woman and the first African-American to hold the position. She would serve three terms before losing to Andrew Bradshaw in a runoff election in 2020.

Andrew Bradshaw was sworn in as the city's youngest mayor on January 4, 2021, but was arrested on November 15 and charged with fifty counts of distributing revenge porn, allegedly posting explicit photos and captions to Reddit in April and May 2021, some which also included racial slurs. City Council President Lajan Cephas assumed the responsibilities of mayor following his arrest. On December 13, city commissioners unanimously voted to recommend that the city attorney remove Bradshaw from office. A special election to elect a new mayor was held on August 23, 2022. No candidate received the majority of the vote, forcing a runoff between the top two candidates on September 20, 2022. Former Cambridge commissioner Stephen Rideout won the runoff election with 55 percent of the vote and became mayor in 2022. Cambridge is currently run by Lajan Cephas.

==== List of mayors (1896–present) ====
- 1896–1900 James G. James
- 1900–1904 Robert G. Henry
- 1904–1908 Clement G. Rogers
- 1908–1910 Zebedee Andrews
- 1910–1912 George M. Phillips
- 1912–1916 Clement G. Rogers
- 1916–1932 Earl W. Orem
- 1932–1940 Charles E. Brohawn
- 1940–1944 Irving B. Jackson
- 1944–1948 Dorsey E. Davis
- 1948–1952 Julian L. Tubman
- 1952–1960 Russell P. Smith, Jr.
- 1960–1964 Calvin W. Mowbray
- 1964–1976 Osvrey C. Pritchett
- 1976–1980 Albert B. Atkinson
- 1980–1992 C. Lloyd Robbins
- 1992–2000 David J. Wooten, Jr.
- 2000–2008 Cleveland L. Rippons
- 2008–2020 Victoria Jackson-Stanley
- 2020–2022 Andrew T. Bradshaw
- 2022–2025 Stephen Rideout
- 2025–present Lajan Cephas

== Horn Point Laboratory ==
Horn Point Laboratory is home to the largest oyster hatchery on the East Coast.

A myth states that in 1699 William Kidd hid treasure, stolen from sugar traders, on land which today is Horn Point Lab. Students and researchers enjoy speculating where the treasure may be.

== Notable people ==
- James A. Adkins, 28th Adjutant General of Maryland and former Secretary of Veterans Affairs of Maryland
- Beatrice Arthur, also known as Bea Arthur (1922–2009), Emmy and Tony Award-winning actress; star of the television sitcoms Maude and The Golden Girls; grew up in Cambridge, where her parents owned and operated a clothing store; voted "wittiest girl" by classmates at Cambridge High School
- John Barth (1930–2024), writer, born in Cambridge
- Stephen Allen Benson (1816–1865), second President of Liberia
- Troy Brohawn (born 1973), retired Major League Baseball player with the Arizona Diamondbacks
- Norman Chaney (1914–1936), played Chubby on Our Comedy, also known as The Little Rascals, 1928–30
- Darnell Clash (born 1962), former professional football player in Canada
- Willis Conover (1920–1996), "Voice of America" DJ, lived in Cambridge during the late 1930s
- Richard Ben Cramer, journalist and author
- Shawn Corey Carter, also known as Jay-Z (born 1969), lived in Cambridge for a short period, before pursuing a music career
- Charles Goldsborough (July 15, 1765 – December 13, 1834), State Senator 1791–1795 and 1799–1801, U.S. Congressman 1789–1791, Governor of Maryland 1818–1819
- Phillips Lee Goldsborough (August 6, 1865 – October 22, 1946), a member of the Republican Party (United States), was a United States Senator representing State of Maryland from 1929 to 1935, 47th Governor of Maryland from 1912 to 1916 and Comptroller of the Maryland Treasury from 1898 to 1900
- Emerson Columbus Harrington (March 26, 1864 – December 15, 1945), 48th Governor of Maryland in the United States from 1916 to 1920, Comptroller of the Maryland Treasury from 1912 to 1916
- Andy Harris, U.S. Congressman for Maryland's 1st District, 2011 to present; Chair of the House Freedom Caucus, 2024 to present; Maryland state senator, 1999 to 2011
- Christopher Harrison, (1780–1868), 1st Lieutenant Governor of Indiana
- Thomas Holliday Hicks (September 2, 1798 – February 14, 1865), 31st Governor of Maryland (January 13, 1858 – January 8, 1862), buried in Cambridge Cemetery
- Arty Hill, country singer, was raised here
- Kripp Johnson, singer of The Del-Vikings
- Antwan Lake, NFL defensive end who played with the Detroit Lions, Atlanta Falcons, and New Orleans Saints
- Henry Lloyd (February 21, 1852 – December 30, 1920), 40th Governor of Maryland (1885 to 1888); lived in Dorchester County and Cambridge
- Carolyn Long, opera singer
- William Vans Murray, U.S. Congressman for Maryland's 5th District, 1789–1791
- Annie Oakley, sharpshooter, lived in Cambridge from 1913 to 1915
- Charles Quinn, reporter for NBC News from 1962 to 1980
- Gloria Richardson (1922–2021), leader of the Cambridge movement during the Civil Rights Movement, 1962–1964
- Sheriff Robinson, baseball player and coach
- Herbert M. St. Clair (1868–1949) businessman, real estate investor, local politician
- Harriet Tubman (1822–1913), escaped slave and activist on the Underground Railroad
