= Sycamore Cottage =

Historic house in Maryland, United States

- U.S. National Register of Historic Places
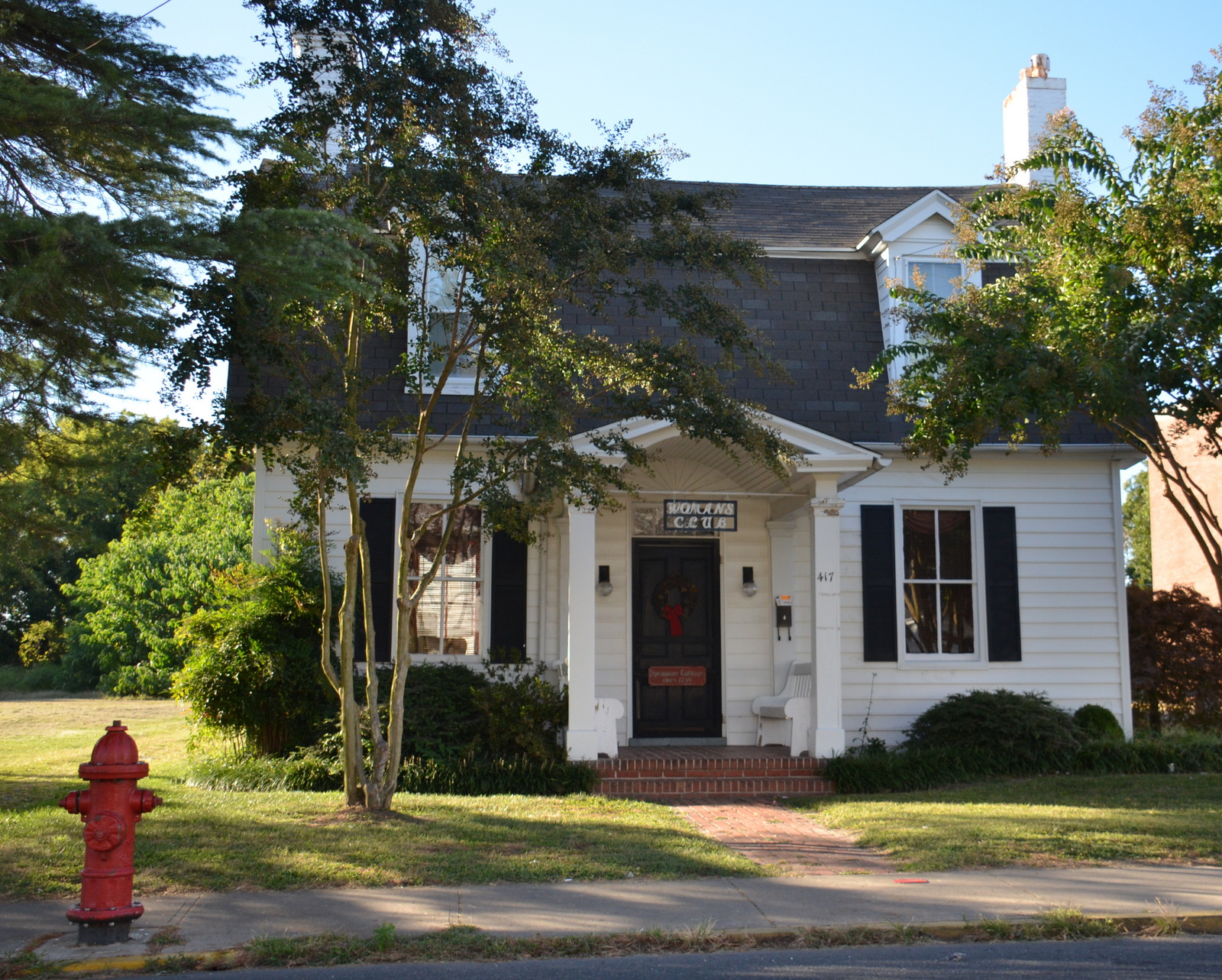

- Location within Maryland Location within the United States
- Location: 417 High St., Cambridge, Maryland
- Coordinates: 38°34′12″N 76°4′46″W
- Area: 0.3 acres (0.12 ha)
- Built: 1765
- Architectural style: Greek Revival, Colonial
- NRHP reference No.: 88000231
- Added to NRHP: March 30, 1988

Sycamore Cottage is a historic home located in Cambridge, Maryland, United States. It was built possibly as early as 1765. The house is a 1 1/2-story gambrel-roofed frame structure. Remodelings during the 19th century include adding Victorian windows, a central Colonial Revival entrance porch, 1840s Greek Revival interior decorative detailing, and the addition of a large one-story meeting hall. It was moved to this location in 1840. Since 1922, Sycamore Cottage has been the headquarters of the Cambridge Woman's Club.

Sycamore Cottage was listed on the National Register of Historic Places in 1988.
