= Cambridge-South Dorchester High School =

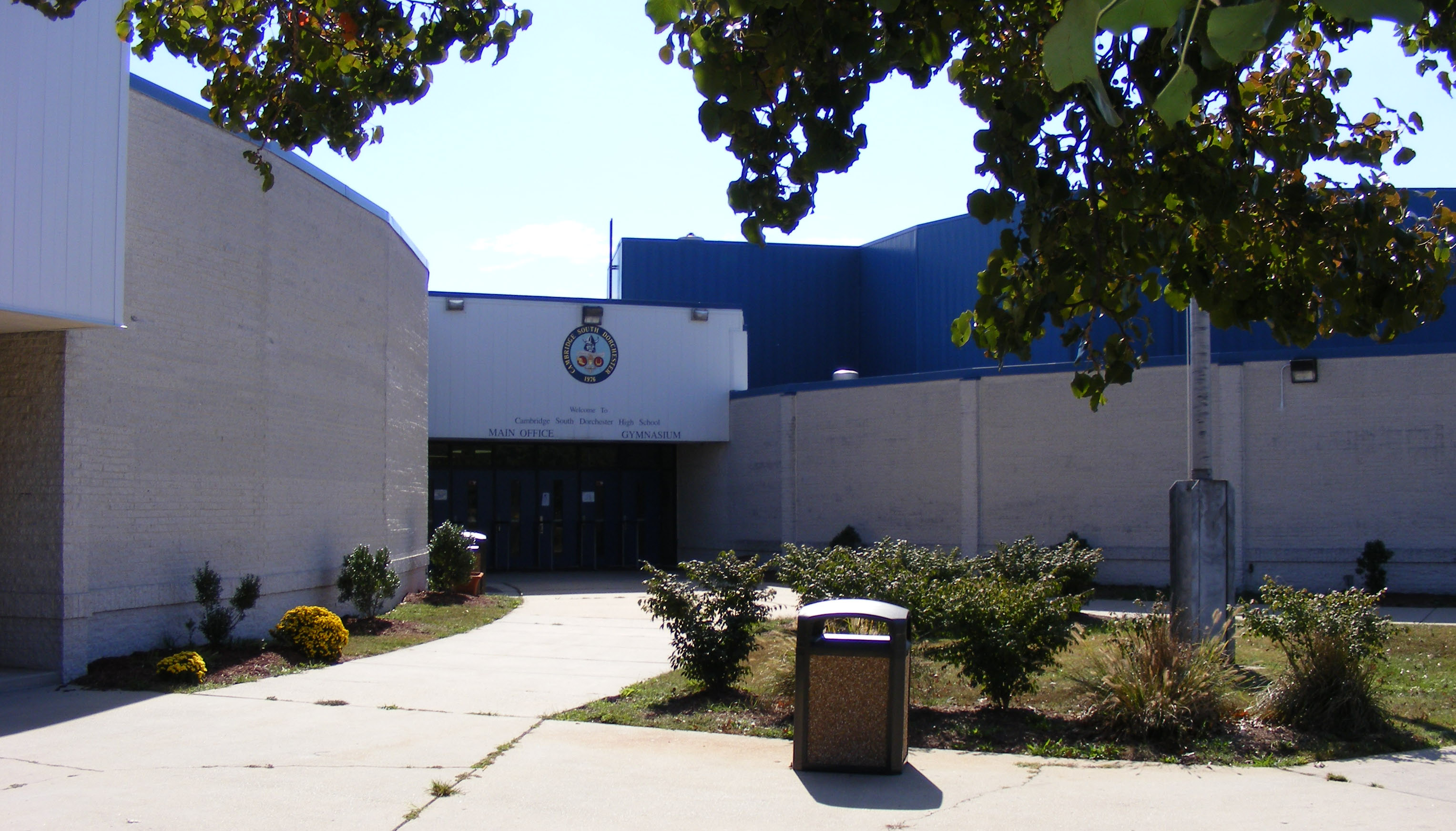

Location
- Cambridge, Maryland; United States; 38°32′40″N 76°5′20″W

Information
- Type: Public Secondary
- Established: 1976
- School district: Dorchester County Public Schools
- Principal: Jerome Stover
- Grades: 9–12
- Campus type: Rural
- Colors: Vegas Gold and Navy Blue
- Website: www.dcps.k12.md.us/o/cambridgesouth

Cambridge-South Dorchester High School is located in Cambridge, Maryland, United States, is part of the Dorchester County Public Schools system, and serves students in grades 9 to 12. The school opened in 1976 and cost $9 million to build and equip. Designed by architects Johannes and Murray of Silver Spring, the school's most prominent feature is its circular design.

== Sports teams ==
Students at C-SDHS can participate in the following sports:

- Boys' Soccer
- Girls' Soccer
- Track
- Cross Country (State Champions - (women's) 2014)
- Cheerleading
- Football (State Champions - 1979, 1995, 1996)
- Boys' Basketball (State Champions - 1955, 1980, 1989, 1996, 2025)
- Girls' Basketball
- Swimming (2013 State Champion Swimming)
- Wrestling (2013 State Champion Wrestler - Jaiveion Turner)
- Tennis
- Softball
- Baseball (State Champions - 1977, 2004, 2013)
- Boys' Lacrosse
- Girls' Lacrosse
