= Stanley Institute =

- U.S. National Register of Historic Places
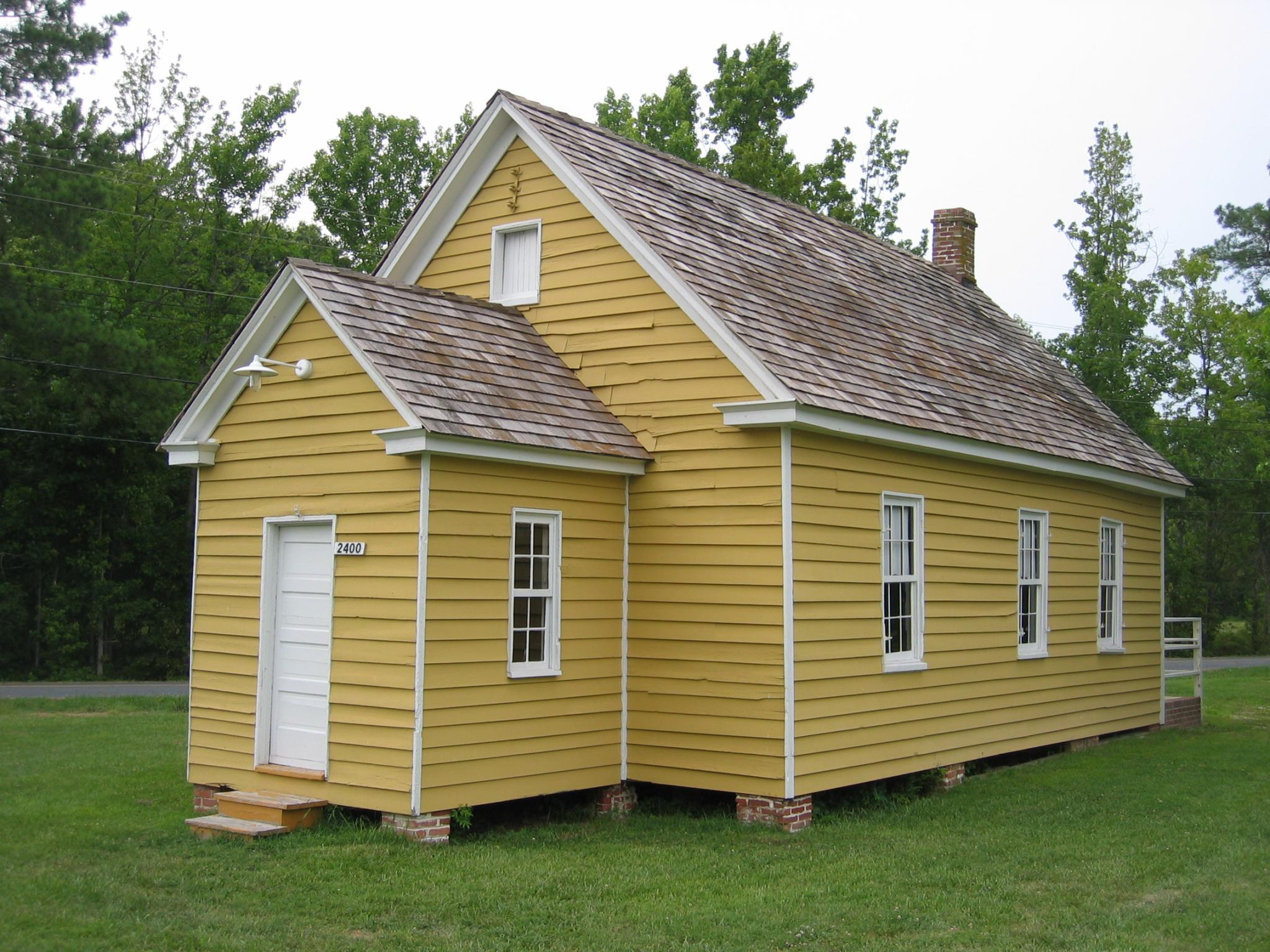
- Stanley Institute, July 2009

- Location within Maryland Location within the United States
- Location: South of Cambridge on Maryland Route 16, near Cambridge, Maryland
- Coordinates: 38°32′41.9618″N 76°6′9.6134″W
- Area: 1 acre (0.40 ha)
- Built: 1865
- NRHP reference No.: 75000888
- Added to NRHP: September 11, 1975

Stanley Institute, also known as Rock School, is a historic African American school building located at Cambridge, Dorchester County, Maryland. It is a rectangular one-story, gable-front frame building with a small entrance vestibule built about 1865. Three original blackboards still occupy their proper locations. The building was moved to its present location from a site near Church Creek in 1867. It served as both a church and a school until the erection of the present Rock Methodist Church later in the 19th century.

It was listed on the National Register of Historic Places in 1975.
