= Yarmouth (Cambridge, Maryland) =

Historic house in Maryland, US

- U.S. National Register of Historic Places
- Location within Maryland Location within the United States
- Location: Bestpitch Ferry Road, Cambridge, Maryland
- Coordinates: 38°26′12″N 76°0′10″W
- Area: 300 acres (120 ha)
- Built: 1730
- NRHP reference No.: 78001455
- Added to NRHP: March 29, 1978

Yarmouth, also known as White House Farm, Brick House Farm, and Eccleston's Hill, is a historic home located at Cambridge, Dorchester County, Maryland, United States. It is a two-story Flemish bond brick structure built above a high basement built about 1730. Also on the property is an 18th-century granary.

Yarmouth was listed on the National Register of Historic Places in 1978.
