= Cambridge Daily Banner =

Defunct newspaper in Cambridge, Maryland

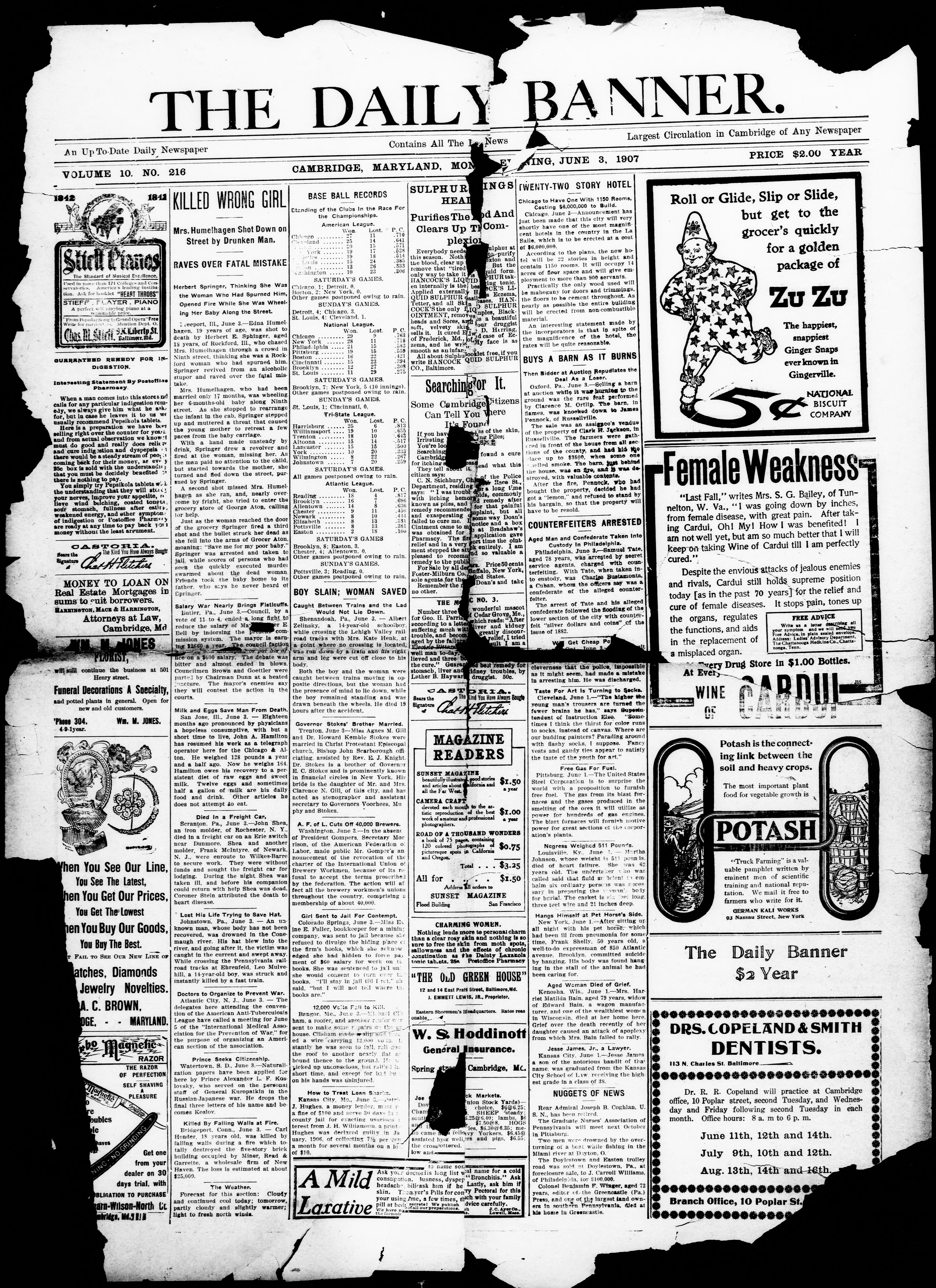
- The cover page of the June 3, 1907 issue of The Daily Banner
- Type: Twice-weekly
- Format: Broadsheet
- Owner(s): Lindsay C. Marshall and Armistead R. Michie (1897-1910), Webb & Webb (1910-1941), Arnold Daane (1941-???), Travis O. Rockey
- Founder(s): Lindsay C. Marshall and Armistead R. Michie
- Publisher: Harrington Henry & Co. (1898-1910), Webb & Webb (1910-1955), Arnold Daane (1955-???)
- Editor: Lindsay C. Marshall (1897-1910), Webb & Webb (1910-1955), Elsie McNamara (1955-1957), Maurice Rimpo (1957-???), Talibah Chikwendu (2007-2009), Logan B. Anderson (2009-2013) Dave Ryan
- Founded: 1897
- Headquarters: 103 Cedar Street, Cambridge, Maryland, USA
- ISSN: 2475-4293
- OCLC number: 18778410

The Cambridge Daily Banner was a local newspaper published in Cambridge, Maryland from September 21, 1897 to August 1, 2008. The newspaper now operates under the name Banner or Dorchester Banner and is owned by Independent News Papers, Inc.

== Overview ==
The Cambridge Daily Banner is the eastern shore's oldest daily newspaper. Independent reports by Mondo Times and Echo Media have put the Daily Banner's circulation at 3,561 copies and 5,600, respectively. The Daily Banner was first published on September 22, 1897 by Lindsay C. Marshall and Armistead R. Michie. In the September 22, 1902 issue, Michie is given full credit for establishing the Banner after studying law at the University of Virginia and practicing law for a few years in Charlottesville, Virginia. The paper notes, "To Mr. Armistead R. Michie, however, belongs the credit of the idea, the execution of which gave Cambridge her first and only daily paper. He it was who, looking over the field for towns large enough for ventures of this sort, decided on Cambridge as the most suitable and promising place."

A year later, the Banner was combined with a local weekly paper, The Chronicle, under the ownership of Harrington, Henry & Company. Marshall remained editor until around 1910, when brothers Edward F. and P. Watson Webb assumed ownership of the paper through their publishing company, Webb & Webb Publishing Company. Edward Webb later went on to become the principal of Hemlock High School in Cambridge. The Daily Banner stopped publishing in 2008.

== Frequency of publication ==
Since August 2017, the Banner has been a weekly paper published every Thursday. Since August 2008, the Banner had been a twice-weekly publication published on Wednesdays and Fridays. Prior to that, the Daily Banner published daily except Saturdays and Sundays. The switch from daily to twice-weekly editions was attributed to a lack of news to report and diminished advertising revenue.
