= Dorchester County Public Schools =

School district in Maryland, United States

Address
- 700 Glasgow Street Cambridge, Maryland, 21613; United States

District information
- Type: Public
- Grades: PreK–12
- NCES District ID: 2400300

Students and staff
- Students: 4,662
- Teachers: 370.0
- Staff: 398.0
- Student–teacher ratio: 12.6

Other information
- Website: www.dcpsmd.org

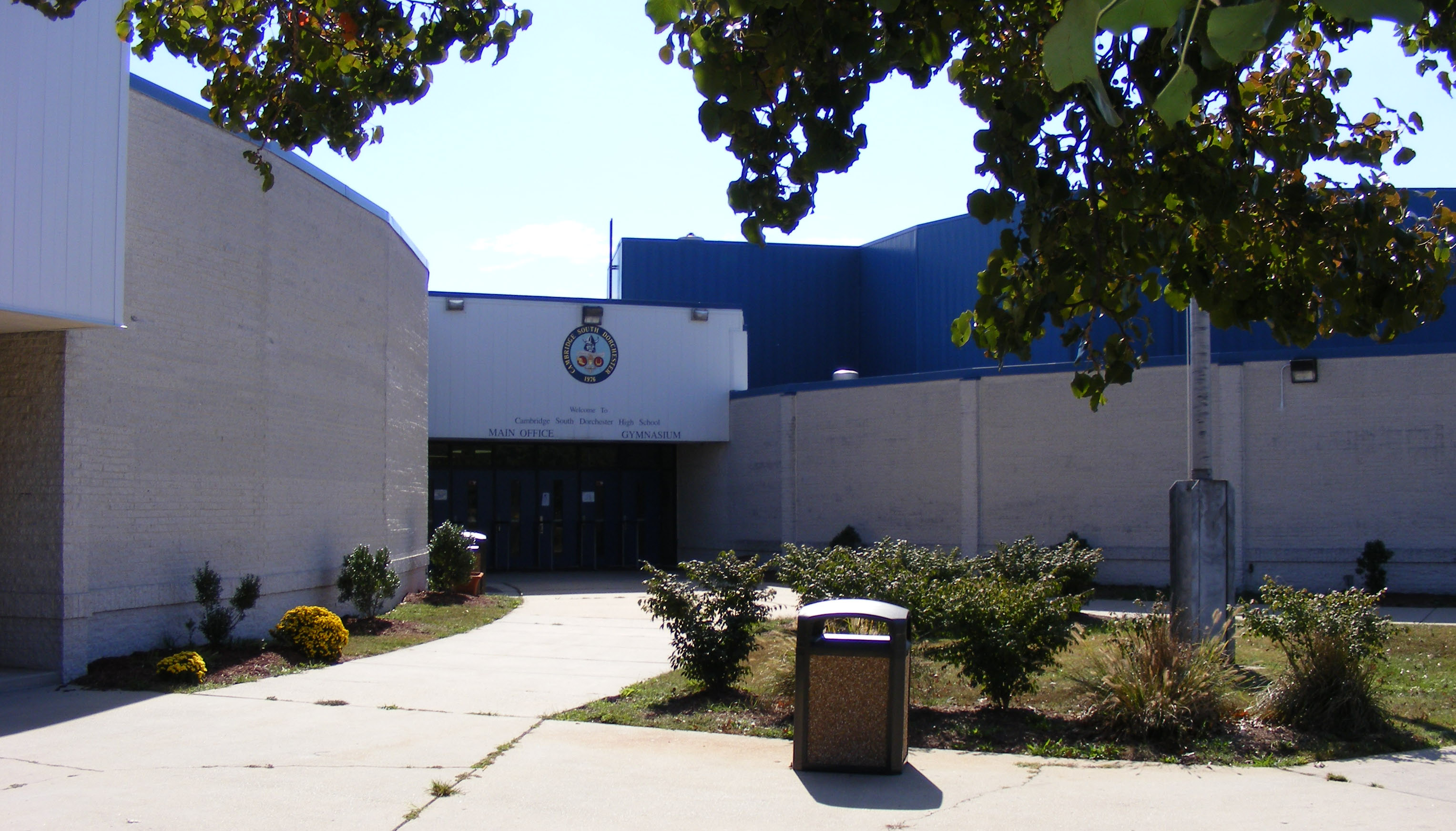
Cambridge-South Dorchester High School, Maryland.

Dorchester County Public Schools is a public school system serving the residents of Dorchester County, Maryland. There are approximately 5,000 students that attend school in the district.

== Board of education members ==
- Superintendent: Mr. W. David Bromwell
- Assistant superintendent N/A
- President: Phil Bramble
- Vice-president: Glen Payne
- Student representatives: Kelli Brinsfield

== High schools ==
- Cambridge-South Dorchester High School, Cambridge
- Dorchester County School of Technology, Cambridge
- North Dorchester High School, Hurlock

== Middle schools ==
- Mace's Lane Middle School, Cambridge
- North Dorchester Middle School, Hurlock

== Elementary schools ==
- Choptank Elementary School, Cambridge
- Hurlock Elementary School, Hurlock
- Maple Elementary School, Cambridge
- Sandy Hill Elementary School, Cambridge
- South Dorchester School (K-8), Church Creek
- Vienna Elementary School, Vienna
- Warwick Elementary School, Secretary

== Notable teachers ==
- Patrick McLaw
