= Cambridge riots of 1963 =

Race riots in Cambridge, Maryland, US

The Cambridge riots of 1963 were race riots that occurred during the summer of 1963 in Cambridge, a small city on the Eastern Shore of Maryland. The riots emerged during the Civil Rights Movement, locally led by Gloria Richardson and the local chapter of the Student Nonviolent Coordinating Committee. They were opposed by segregationists including the police.

== Background: Events of 1962 ==
In January 1962, Baltimore's Civic Interest Group (CIG) - an affiliate of the Student Nonviolent Coordinating Committee (SNCC) - began organizing sit-ins and freedom rides in towns along Maryland's Eastern Shore. When SNCC organizers arrived in Cambridge, demonstrations were organized downtown to demand desegregation of local businesses. The Cambridge Nonviolent Action Committee (CNAC) was founded soon after these initial demonstrations to support and continue local protests.

Governor J. Millard Tawes urged the Maryland General Assembly to pass an anti-discrimination bill aimed at ending prejudice in establishments throughout the state, though the effort was hampered when Eastern Shore legislators pushed to allow counties to exempt themselves from enforcement of the bill.

At the close of the summer of 1962, most establishments in Cambridge were still segregated, with CNAC-led protests dwindling as school resumed for its student members.

== Events of 1963 ==
Demonstrations by the CNAC resumed at the end of March, when a local movie theater expanded its discriminatory practices by relegating African-Americans to the back rows of the balcony instead of the entire balcony, as had been done previously. This escalation motivated leaders of both the CNAC and CIG to meet with city officials to discuss the desegregation of public accommodations, equal employment opportunities, and fair housing for African Americans, but their demands went unmet. In response, demonstrators marched through downtown Cambridge to protest the continuing segregation allowed in public venues, which ended with the arrest of Richardson and sixteen other demonstrators for "disorderly conduct." A boycott of white-owned businesses was then organized by the CNAC, with this pattern of protests, arrests, boycotts, and harassment continuing through April.

CNAC demonstrations continued in mid-May, with many of them led by high school students Dwight Cromwell and Dinez White, both 15, who were later charged with "disorderly conduct" after being arrested while praying peacefully outside of a segregated facility. Cromwell and White were held without bail and eventually sentenced to indefinite incarceration in a state juvenile facility. Marches were organized by the CNAC on the nights of June 11 and June 12 to protest the sentences given to Cromwell and White. On June 13, a third march was organized downtown. On June 14, several white-owned businesses in the Second Ward - a predominately African-American section of town - were set on fire, and gunfire was exchanged between white and African-American citizens, resulting in casualties.

Gloria Richardson, a graduate of Howard University, helped establish organizations that addressed community concerns about civil rights. Richardson also was a key leader in promoting black pride.

Governor Tawes declared martial law and deployed the Maryland National Guard to Cambridge after the CNAC refused a year-long moratorium on protests. The guardsmen remained in the town for 25 days, from June 14 through July 8.

On July 11 a clash between whites and African-Americans broke out when six sit-in demonstrators at Dizzyland restaurant, one of the main targets of the CNACs summer-long integration campaign, were harassed and beaten by white patrons. Tensions further increased when 250 African-Americans organized a "freedom walk" to the Dorchester County Court House that evening and were met by a crowd of 700 whites. The two groups were kept apart and eventually dispersed by the Maryland State Police. Cambridge remained quiet until 10 p.m., when two white men and a 12-year-old boy were wounded by shotgun fire near their homes and police brought eight African-American men in for questioning.

In the early morning hours of July 12, two carloads of white men drove through the Second Ward, exchanging gunfire with African Americans. Police arrested five white men in their early 20s after the first exchange of gunfire in the African-American district. Three National Guardsmen in a civilian car were injured when a gunshot blast punctured their windshield during the second round of gunfire between whites and African Americans. Order was reestablished around 2 a.m. on July 12 and Major George E. Davidson of the Maryland State Police recommended to Governor Tawes that full martial law be reinstated.

The Maryland National Guard was redeployed to Cambridge, where they would remain for the next year. Brigadier General George Gelston, assistant state adjutant general and commander of the troops, imposed a modified martial law that consisted of a 9 p.m. curfew, a ban on further racial demonstrations, and prohibitions of carrying firearms and selling liquor.

== Events of 1967 ==
In July 1967, the National States Rights party and the Ku Klux Klan came to the city of Cambridge to protest school desegregation. The situation escalated when Hubert Gerold "H. Rap" Brown, a Black Power advocate, arrived in Cambridge in late July. Brown made comments such as "burn this town down" and "It's time for Cambridge to explode," if the local blacks felt that their demands were not being met. The National Guard was quickly ordered into the city. Brown was arrested and charged with arson, inciting riot, and disturbing the peace.

Brown is alleged to have had no direct relationship with the violence of 1967 and some historians have disputed as to whether it actually qualified as a riot. Documents from the Kerner Commission investigation claim to have shown that he completed his speech at 10 pm July 24, then walked a woman home and was shot by a deputy sheriff without provocation. Brown was hastily treated for his injuries and secretly taken out of Cambridge. The one major fire did not break out until hours later, and its expansion is attributed to the deliberate inaction of the Cambridge police and fire departments, which had hostile relations with the black community. The head of the Cambridge police department, Brice Kinnamon, nonetheless claimed that the city had no racial problems, Brown was the "sole" cause of the disorder, and it was "a well-planned Communist attempt to overthrow the government."

== See also ==
- Cambridge riot of 1967
- List of incidents of civil unrest in the United States
