= SS Great Yarmouth =

History
- Name: SS Great Yarmouth
- Operator: 1866–1873: Great Eastern Railway
- Port of registry: (United Kingdom)
- Builder: Thames Graving Dock Company
- Launched: 1866
- Out of service: 1887
- Fate: Wrecked

General characteristics
- Tonnage: 731 gross register tons (GRT)
- Length: 199.9 feet (60.9 m)
- Beam: 28.4 feet (8.7 m)
- Depth: 17 feet (5.2 m)
- Installed power: 100 hp
- Speed: 10.5 knots

SS Great Yarmouth was a freight vessel built for the Great Eastern Railway in 1866.

== History ==
The ship was built by the Thames Graving Dock Company in London in 1866. She was placed on the Harwich to Antwerp cargo service. She was the first screw steamer in the Great Eastern Railway Company fleet. The hold was built with a double lining, which could hold 100 tons of water, and had a powerful steam pump independent of the main engines connected to clear it. On each side were bunkers capable of storing 100 tons of coal.

On 28 December 1868, she came to the rescue of the steamship Berussia which had broken her main shaft on a voyage from New York to Hamburg. An attempt to tow the Berussia failed and the Great Yarmouth took some of the passengers and transferred them to Portland.

She was sold to in 1873 to Thomas Gage Beatley and later ended up in the ownership of Mr Joseph Reay of Newcastle.

She was stranded at Skutskär in Åland in 1887, and a strong sea later destroyed the vessel.
