= Dorchester County, Maryland =

County in Maryland, United States

- County
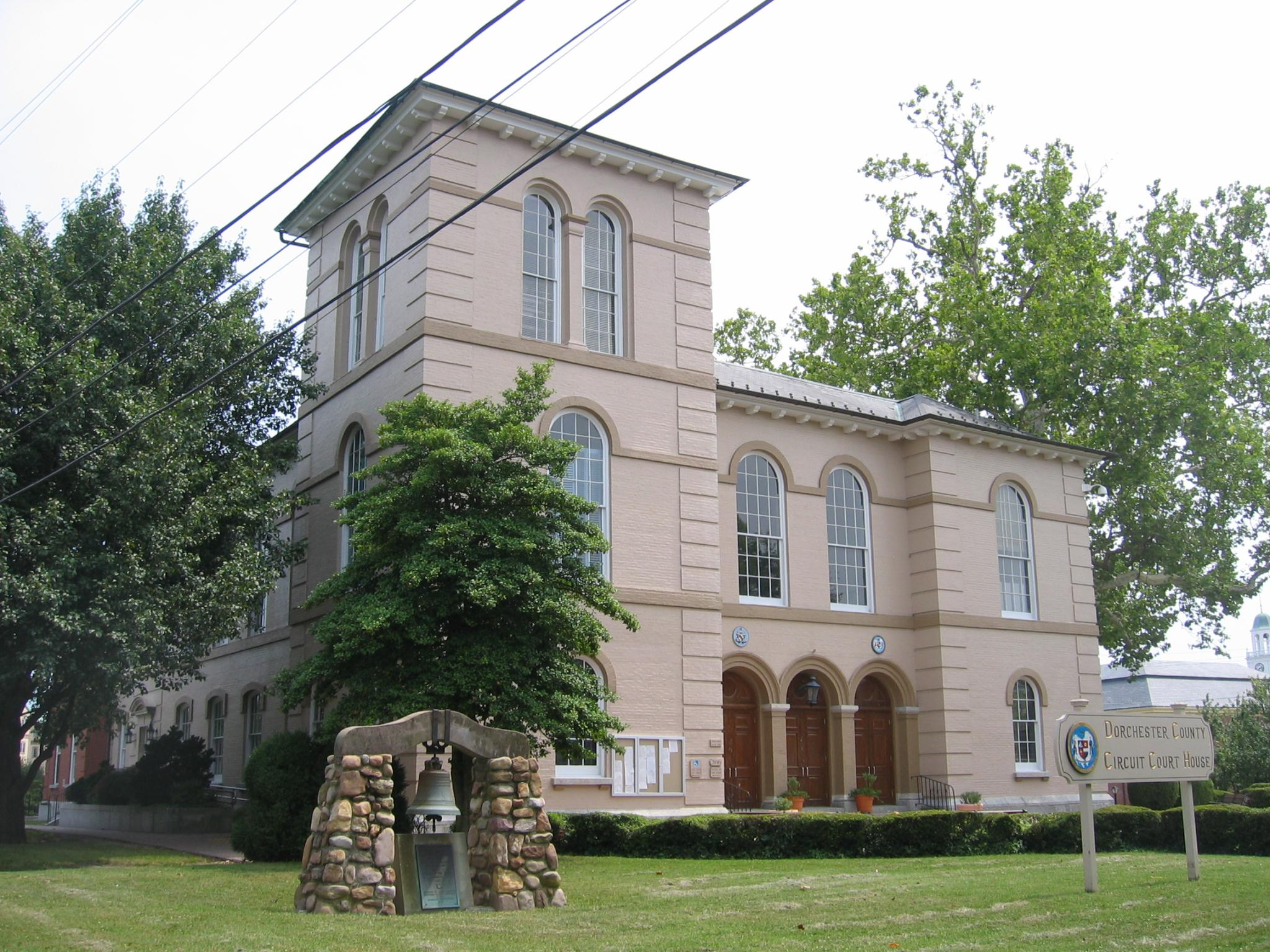
- Dorchester County Courthouse and Jail

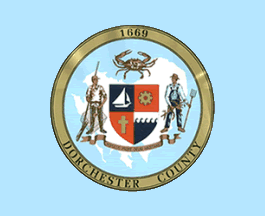
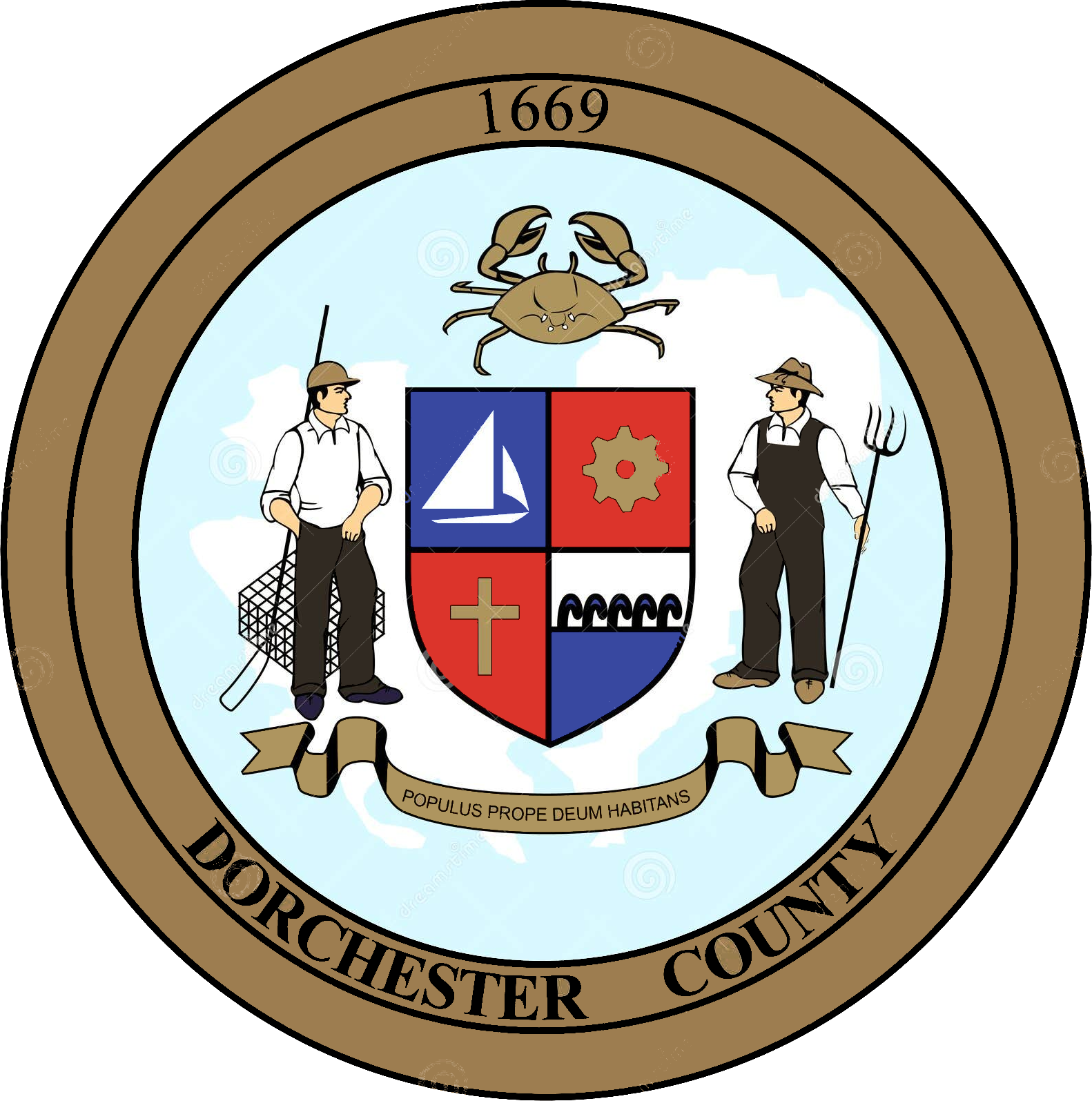
- Flag Seal

- Location within the U.S. state of Maryland
- Coordinates: 38°25′N 76°05′W
- Country: United States
- State: Maryland
- Founded: 1669
- Named for: Earl of Dorset
- Seat: Cambridge
- Largest city: Cambridge

Area
  - Total: 983 sq mi (2,550 km^{2})
  - Land: 541 sq mi (1,400 km^{2})
  - Water: 442 sq mi (1,140 km^{2}) 45%

Population (2020)
  - Total: 32,531
  - Estimate (2025): 33,628 ▲
  - Density: 60.13/sq mi (23.22/km^{2})
- Time zone: UTC−5 (Eastern)
  - Summer (DST): UTC−4 (EDT)
- Congressional district: 1st
- Website: dorchestermd.gov

Dorchester County is located in the U.S. state of Maryland. At the 2020 census, the population was 32,531. Its county seat is Cambridge. The county was formed in 1669 and named for the Earl of Dorset, a family friend of the Calverts (the founding family of the Maryland colony). The county is part of the Mid-Eastern Shore region of the state.

Dorchester County comprises the Cambridge, MD Micropolitan Statistical Area, which is also included in the Salisbury-Cambridge, MD-DE Combined Statistical Area.

Dorchester County is the largest county by total area in Maryland. It is bordered by the Choptank River to the north, Talbot County to the northwest, Caroline County to the northeast, Wicomico County to the southeast, Sussex County, Delaware, to the east, and the Chesapeake Bay to the west. Dorchester County uses the slogan, "The Heart of Chesapeake Country", due to its geographical location and the heart-like shape of the county on a map.

== History ==
Many residents of Dorchester County have historically been watermen and farmers. The Chesapeake Bay and its tributaries provide harvests of crabs, oysters and many fish species to both commercial and recreational fishermen. Dorchester County was the birthplace of Harriet Tubman, who escaped from slavery and afterward worked to guide other refugee slaves to freedom in the North.

Dorchester County has been hit by two deadly tornadoes. The first occurred on June 23, 1944, in Cambridge, where two people were killed and 33 were injured. The other was on May 8, 1984, in Hurlock, where one death and six injuries were reported. Both storms caused between 500,000 and 5 million dollars of damage.

During the 1960s, Dorchester County was home to many key civil rights events, including the Cambridge movement from 1961 to 1964, the Cambridge riot of 1963, and the Cambridge riot of 1967.

The Cambridge movement led to the negotiation of "The Treaty of Cambridge" among federal, state, and local leaders in July 1963, initiating desegregation in the city prior to passage of federal civil rights laws. Notable signatories of the treaty include U.S. Attorney General Robert F. Kennedy, U.S. Assistant Attorney General Burke Marshall, chairman of the Student Nonviolent Coordinating Committee (SNCC) John Lewis, Maryland Attorney General Thomas B. Finan, NAACP secretary Stanley Branche, and civil rights activist Gloria Richardson.

== Politics, government and law ==
Dorchester County operates under the charter home rule form of government, and the affairs of the county are managed by five county council members. Each is elected from a single-member district defined within the county. Meetings of the county council are held weekly. The agenda and the minutes of each week's proceedings are public record.

In earlier times, unlike highly secessionist Wicomico, Worcester, Queen Anne's and Cecil counties, Dorchester was a swing county in the late 19th century due to the voting power of its freedman population, who strongly supported the Republican Party. The conservative whites voted Democratic for William Jennings Bryan in 1908, after Maryland had passed laws raising barriers to voter registration among blacks, resulting in a dramatic drop in their voting until after passage of civil rights legislation in the 1960s.

The white population of Dorchester has historically voted very conservatively. Along with rock-ribbed Unionist Garrett County, located in Appalachia, its white majority was one of only two Maryland counties to vote for Barry Goldwater in 1964. During the following election, Dorchester was the only county in the state where the segregationist George Wallace outpolled either Nixon or Humphrey. In the late 20th century, white conservatives in the South shifted from the Democratic to the Republican Party. Since then the only Democratic presidential nominee to carry Dorchester County was southern native son Bill Clinton in 1996.

The county has trended less conservative in recent years, with Democrat Barack Obama coming within five percentage points of beating Mitt Romney in the 2012 presidential election; Obama won nationally.

=== Voter registration ===
Voter registration and party enrollment as of March 2024
Democratic	9,521	40.78%
Republican	9,229	39.53%
Unaffiliated	4,221	18.08%
Libertarian	115	0.49%
Other parties	262	1.12%
Total	23,348	100%

United States presidential election results for Dorchester County, Maryland
Year	Republican		Democratic		Third party(ies)	
Year	No.	%	No.	%	No.	%
1892	2,365	51.45%	2,015	43.83%	217	4.72%
1896	3,048	52.24%	2,638	45.21%	149	2.55%
1900	3,366	53.93%	2,733	43.78%	143	2.29%
1904	2,680	55.04%	2,087	42.86%	102	2.09%
1908	2,627	47.89%	2,769	50.48%	89	1.62%
1912	2,387	44.79%	2,509	47.08%	433	8.13%
1916	2,468	46.39%	2,750	51.69%	102	1.92%
1920	4,218	51.38%	3,950	48.11%	42	0.51%
1924	3,356	50.76%	3,047	46.08%	209	3.16%
1928	6,333	74.20%	2,180	25.54%	22	0.26%
1932	3,466	43.05%	4,547	56.47%	39	0.48%
1936	3,735	41.32%	5,293	58.56%	11	0.12%
1940	3,953	39.03%	6,088	60.11%	87	0.86%
1944	4,241	47.10%	4,764	52.90%	0	0.00%
1948	3,751	44.92%	4,507	53.97%	93	1.11%
1952	5,524	52.61%	4,823	45.94%	152	1.45%
1956	5,809	60.88%	3,733	39.12%	0	0.00%
1960	4,626	48.24%	4,964	51.76%	0	0.00%
1964	5,327	53.86%	4,564	46.14%	0	0.00%
1968	4,183	41.36%	2,714	26.83%	3,217	31.81%
1972	6,859	74.97%	2,136	23.35%	154	1.68%
1976	4,768	51.29%	4,528	48.71%	0	0.00%
1980	5,160	48.91%	4,908	46.52%	482	4.57%
1984	6,699	67.12%	3,160	31.66%	122	1.22%
1988	6,343	62.55%	3,709	36.58%	88	0.87%
1992	4,934	45.03%	3,933	35.89%	2,090	19.07%
1996	4,337	43.14%	4,613	45.88%	1,104	10.98%
2000	5,847	51.33%	5,232	45.93%	313	2.75%
2004	7,801	58.48%	5,411	40.57%	127	0.95%
2008	8,168	53.48%	6,912	45.25%	194	1.27%
2012	7,976	51.64%	7,257	46.99%	211	1.37%
2016	8,413	55.26%	6,245	41.02%	567	3.72%
2020	8,764	54.85%	6,857	42.92%	356	2.23%
2024	9,390	55.99%	6,954	41.46%	428	2.55%

=== Law enforcement ===
The county is policed by the Dorchester County Sheriff's Office (DSO), the Maryland State Police, and the DNR Police. The DSO is a full service agency, headed by Sheriff James W. Phillips Jr. since December 2002.

== Geography ==
According to the U.S. Census Bureau, the county has a total area of 983 square miles (2,550 km^{2}), of which 541 square miles (1,400 km^{2}) is land and 442 square miles (1,140 km^{2}) (45%) is water. It is the largest county in Maryland by area.

=== Climate ===
Dorchester has a humid subtropical climate (Cfa) according to the Köppen climate classification. The Trewartha climate classification has only the area near the bay as Cf and the remainder of the county as oceanic (Do.) Average monthly temperatures in Cambridge range from 36.1 °F in January to 78.4 °F in July.

=== Adjacent counties ===
- Caroline County (north and northeast)
- Sussex County, Delaware (east)
- Talbot County (north)
- Somerset County (southeast)
- Saint Mary's County (southwest)
- Wicomico County (east and southeast)
- Calvert County (west)

=== National protected area ===
- Blackwater National Wildlife Refuge

== Demographics ==
Historical population
Census	Pop.	Note	%±
1790	15,875		—
1800	16,346		3.0%
1810	18,108		10.8%
1820	17,759		−1.9%
1830	18,686		5.2%
1840	18,843		0.8%
1850	18,877		0.2%
1860	20,461		8.4%
1870	19,458		−4.9%
1880	23,110		18.8%
1890	24,843		7.5%
1900	27,962		12.6%
1910	28,669		2.5%
1920	27,895		−2.7%
1930	26,813		−3.9%
1940	28,006		4.4%
1950	27,815		−0.7%
1960	29,666		6.7%
1970	29,405		−0.9%
1980	30,623		4.1%
1990	30,236		−1.3%
2000	30,674		1.4%
2010	32,618		6.3%
2020	32,531		−0.3%
2025 (est.)	33,628	▲	3.4%
U.S. Decennial Census; 1790-1960 1900-1990; 1990-2000 2010–2018

Dorchester County is sparsely populated and is the least densely populated county in Maryland. The largest town is Cambridge with a population of 12,326 as of the 2010 census. Much of this county is made up of marshlands, forest, and farmland.

=== Racial and ethnic composition ===
Dorchester County, Maryland – Racial and ethnic composition Note: the US Census treats Hispanic/Latino as an ethnic category. This table excludes Latinos from the racial categories and assigns them to a separate category. Hispanics/Latinos may be of any race.
Race / Ethnicity (NH = Non-Hispanic)	Pop 1980	Pop 1990	Pop 2000	Pop 2010	Pop 2020	% 1980	% 1990	% 2000	% 2010	% 2020
White alone (NH)	21,307	21,478	21,117	21,581	19,891	69.58%	71.03%	68.84%	66.16%	61.14%
Black or African American alone (NH)	8,926	8,382	8,658	8,937	9,017	29.15%	27.72%	28.23%	27.40%	27.72%
Native American or Alaska Native alone (NH)	16	51	69	99	91	0.05%	0.17%	0.22%	0.30%	0.28%
Asian alone (NH)	71	135	199	299	355	0.23%	0.45%	0.65%	0.92%	1.09%
Native Hawaiian or Pacific Islander alone (NH)	x	x	1	8	6	x	x	0.00%	0.02%	0.02%
Other race alone (NH)	10	13	6	28	130	0.03%	0.04%	0.02%	0.09%	0.40%
Mixed race or Multiracial (NH)	x	x	239	536	1,264	x	x	0.78%	1.64%	3.89%
Hispanic or Latino (any race)	293	177	385	1,130	1,777	0.96%	0.59%	1.26%	3.46%	5.46%
Total	30,623	30,236	30,674	32,618	32,531	100.00%	100.00%	100.00%	100.00%	100.00%

=== 2020 census ===
As of the 2020 census, the county had a population of 32,531. The median age was 45.1 years. 20.9% of residents were under the age of 18 and 22.3% of residents were 65 years of age or older. For every 100 females there were 91.4 males, and for every 100 females age 18 and over there were 88.9 males age 18 and over. 46.0% of residents lived in urban areas, while 54.0% lived in rural areas.

The racial makeup of the county was 61.9% White, 28.1% Black or African American, 0.4% American Indian and Alaska Native, 1.1% Asian, 0.0% Native Hawaiian and Pacific Islander, 2.9% from some other race, and 5.6% from two or more races. Hispanic or Latino residents of any race comprised 5.5% of the population.

There were 13,721 households in the county, of which 27.3% had children under the age of 18 living with them and 32.7% had a female householder with no spouse or partner present. About 30.4% of all households were made up of individuals and 14.5% had someone living alone who was 65 years of age or older.

There were 16,383 housing units, of which 16.2% were vacant. Among occupied housing units, 65.8% were owner-occupied and 34.2% were renter-occupied. The homeowner vacancy rate was 2.7% and the rental vacancy rate was 6.7%.

=== 2010 census ===
At the 2010 United States census, there were 32,618 people, 13,522 households and 8,894 families residing in the county. The population density was 60.3 inhabitants per square mile (23.3/km^{2}). There were 16,554 housing units at an average density of 30.6 per square mile (11.8/km^{2}). The racial makeup of the county was 67.6% white, 27.7% black or African American, 0.9% Asian, 0.3% American Indian, 1.4% from other races, and 1.9% from two or more races. Those of Hispanic or Latino origin made up 3.5% of the population. In terms of ancestry, 17.0% were American, 13.9% were English, 11.4% were German, and 11.1% were Irish.

Of the 13,522 households, 28.7% had children under the age of 18 living with them, 44.6% were married couples living together, 16.0% had a female householder with no husband present, 34.2% were non-families, and 28.4% of all households were made up of individuals. The average household size was 2.37 and the average family size was 2.88. The median age was 43.3 years.

The median household income was $45,151 and the median family income was $56,662. Males had a median income of $40,814 and females $30,184. The per capita income was $25,139. About 9.5% of families and 13.4% of the population were below the poverty line, including 19.4% of those under age 18 and 9.2% of those age 65 or over. In 2010, the racial makeup of the county was 66.16% Non-Hispanic whites, 27.70% blacks, 0.34% Native Americans, 0.92% Asians, 0.03% Pacific Islanders, 0.09% Non-Hispanics from some other race, 1.64% Non-Hispanics reporting two or more races and 3.64% Hispanic or Latino.

=== 2000 census ===
At the 2000 census, there were 30,674 people, 12,706 households and 8,500 families residing in the county. The population density was 55 per square mile (21/km^{2}). There were 14,681 housing units at an average density of 26 per square mile (10/km^{2}). The racial makeup of the county was 69.45% White, 28.39% Black or African American, 0.23% Native American, 0.66% Asian, 0.00% Pacific Islander, 0.39% from other races, and 0.89% from two or more races. 1.26% of the population was Hispanic or Latino of any race. 20.1% were of American, 12.7% English, 9.8% German and 8.2% Irish ancestry.

There were 12,706 households, of which 27.30% had children under the age of 18 living with them, 47.50% were married couples living together, 15.50% had a female householder with no husband present, and 33.10% were non-families. 28.20% of all households were made up of individuals, and 13.50% had someone living alone who was 65 years of age or older. The average household size was 2.36 and the average family size was 2.86.

23.30% of the population were under the age of 18, 6.70% from 18 to 24, 26.80% from 25 to 44, 25.50% from 45 to 64, and 17.70% who were 65 years of age or older. The median age was 41 years. For every 100 females there were 89.80 males. For every 100 females age 18 and over, there were 86.40 males.

The median household income was $34,077 and the median family income was $41,917. Males had a median income of $29,014 and females $22,284. The per capita income was $18,929. 13.80% of the population and 10.10% of families were below the poverty line. 18.10% of those under the age of 18 and 14.20% of those 65 and older were living below the poverty line.

== Education ==
=== Dorchester County Public Schools ===
- Dorchester County School of Technology
- Choptank Elementary School
- Hurlock Elementary School
- Maple Elementary School
- Sandy Hill Elementary School
- South Dorchester K-8
- Vienna Elementary School
- Warwick Elementary School
- Mace's Lane Middle School
- North Dorchester Middle School
- Cambridge-South Dorchester High School
- North Dorchester High School

== Media ==
The local newspapers are The Dorchester Banner and The Dorchester Star (a free, weekly publication). A regional newspaper, The Star Democrat, serves several counties on the Mid-Shore, including Dorchester.

Dorchester County is included in the coverage area of local television stations WBOC, WMDT and WRDE-LD. It also receives coverage from television stations based in Baltimore and Washington, D.C. It is also by a local LPFM radio station, WHCP-LP (101.5FM), operated by the locally based non-profit Cambridge Community Radio, Inc.

== Communities ==
=== City ===
- Cambridge (county seat)

=== Towns ===
- Brookview
- Church Creek
- East New Market
- Eldorado
- Galestown
- Hurlock
- Secretary
- Vienna

=== Census-designated places ===
- Algonquin
- Elliott
- Fishing Creek
- Madison
- Taylors Island

=== Non-census designated places ===
- Salem
- Woolford

== Notable people ==
- Beatrice Arthur - actress
- John Barth - author
- J. Webb Thomas – state senator
- Harriet Tubman - abolitionist hero

== See also ==
- National Register of Historic Places listings in Dorchester County, Maryland
