= Cambridge movement (civil rights) =

American social movement in Dorchester County, Maryland

- Part of the Civil Rights Movement
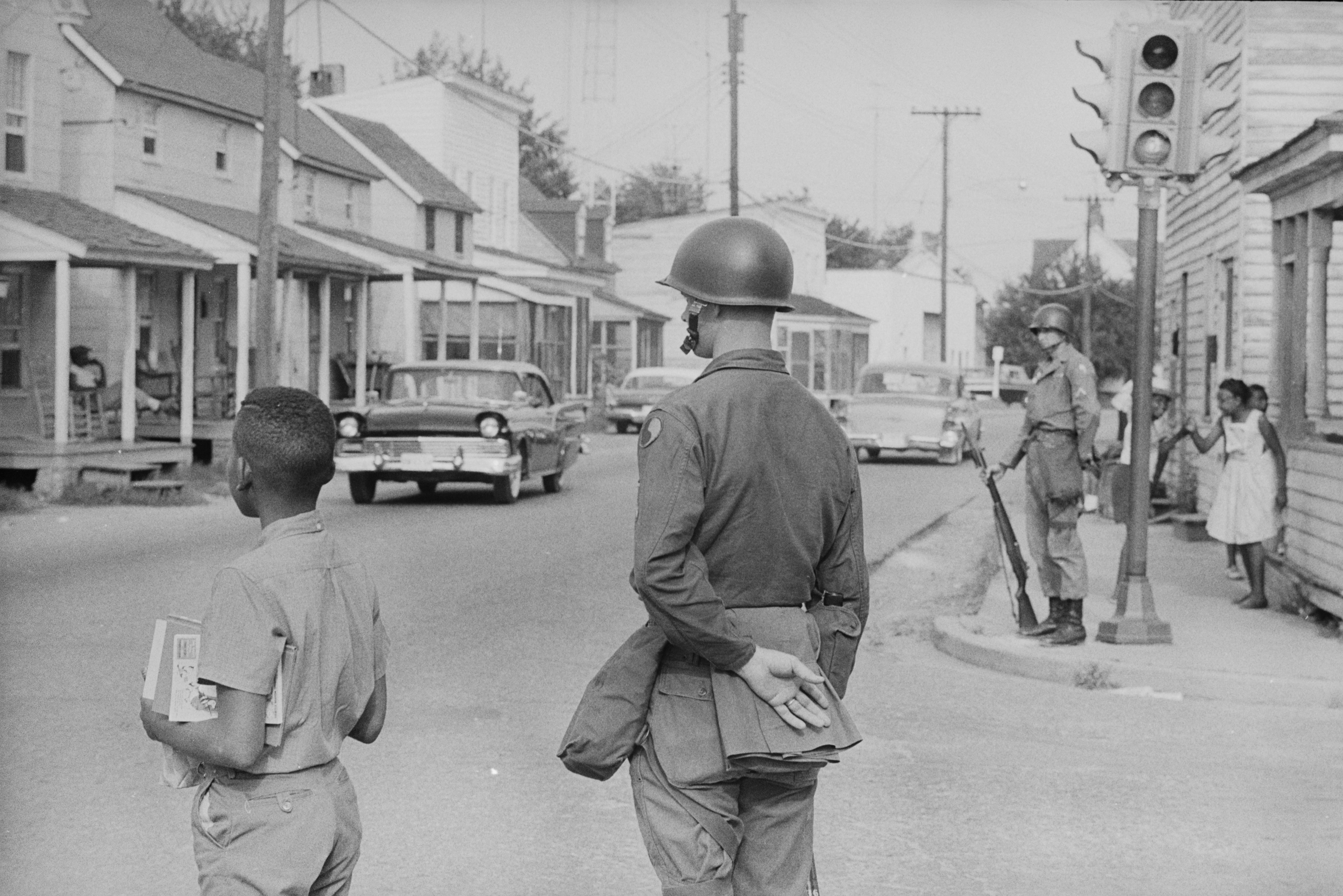
- Date: December 1961 – 1964
- Location: Pine Street Neighborhood, Cambridge, Maryland, and U.S. Route 40 in Maryland
- Caused by: Racial segregation in public accommodations and schools; Creation of Route 40 campaign, Eastern Shore project, and Freedom Highways campaign
- Result: Maryland Public Accommodations Law (1964); Catalyst for passage of Civil Rights Act of 1964

Parties
Cambridge Nonviolent Action Committee (CNAC); Civic Interest Group (CIG); Student Nonviolent Coordinating Committee (SNCC); Nonviolent Action Group (NAG); Northern Student Movement (NSM); Black Action Federation (BAF); Cambridge Guerrillas	City of Cambridge; Dorchester Business & Citizens' Association (DBCA); Committee on Interracial Understanding (CIU)

Lead figures
CNAC members: Gloria Richardson; Enez S. Grubb; Sally Garrison; CIG member: Clarence Logan; SNCC members: Reggie Robinson; Bill Hansen; H. Rap Brown	Mayor of Cambridge: Calvin Mawbray

The Cambridge movement was an American social movement in Dorchester County, Maryland that was active from 1961 to 1964 as part of the civil rights movement. It was led by Gloria Richardson and the Cambridge Nonviolent Action Committee as a series of protests, which the governor J. Millard Tawes fought by declaring martial law, the longest period in the country since 1877. The movement led to the desegregation of all schools, recreational areas, and hospitals in Maryland. Many cite it as the birth of the Black Power movement.

== Background ==
Black residents of Cambridge had the right to vote, but they were still discriminated against and lacked economic opportunities. Their homes lacked plumbing, with some even living in "chicken shacks". Since the local hospitals were segregated and only served white people, Black residents had to drive two hours to Baltimore for medical care. They experienced the highest rates of unemployment. The Black unemployment rate was four times higher than that of whites. The only two local factories, both defense contractors, had agreed not to hire any Black workers, provided that the whites agreed not to unionize. All venues of entertainment, churches, cafes, and schools were segregated. Black schools received half as much funding as white schools. Even though a third of Cambridge's residents were Black, there were only three Black police officers. These officers were not permitted to patrol white neighborhoods or arrest white individuals.

== The movement ==
=== Initial protests ===
On Christmas Eve of 1961, Student Nonviolent Coordinating Committee Field Secretaries, Reggie Robinson and Bill Hansen, arrived and began organizing student protests. The Cambridge Movement, much like Freedom Summer, placed significant emphasis on voter education drives, but there were some differences. In Cambridge, local white residents did not react as violently to increased Black voter registration as they did in Mississippi. In fact, some white moderates even advocated for voter registration, viewing it as a better alternative to direct action protests in the streets and public facilities. Moreover, Black voter registration did not threaten the white majority as it did in the Black Belt in the American South.

In 1962, the Cambridge Nonviolent Action Committee (CNAC) was organized to run these protests. Gloria Richardson and Inez Grubb both became the co-chairs of CNAC, which was the only SNCC affiliate not led by students. The CNAC began picketing businesses that refused to hire Black people and conducted sit-ins at lunch-counters that would not serve Black individuals. White mobs often disrupted these protests. Protests on Race Street, which separated the Black and white communities, often turned violent. Cleveland Sellers, a SNCC Field Secretary, later reflected, "By the time we got to town, Cambridge's Black people had stopped extolling the virtues of passive resistance. Guns were carried as a matter of course and it was understood that they would be used." Richardson defended such actions by the Black community, stating, "Self-defense may actually be a deterrent to further violence. Hitherto, the government has moved into conflict situations only when matters approach the level of insurrection."

In the spring of 1963, tensions rose steadily over a period of seven weeks. During this time, Richardson and 80 other protesters were arrested. By June, Black residents were rioting in the streets. Maryland Governor J. Millard Tawes met with the protesters at a local school, offering to accelerate school desegregation, build public housing, and establish a biracial commission if the protests ceased. The CNAC rejected the deal. In response, Governor Tawes declared martial law and sent the National Guard to Cambridge.

=== Treaty of Cambridge ===
Potential violence near Washington, D.C., brought Cambridge to the attention of the Kennedy Administration. Attorney General Robert F. Kennedy initiated discussions with the CNAC. Together with the local city government, they arrived at an agreement aimed at averting possible violence. The agreement, named the 'Treaty of Cambridge,' proposed to desegregate public facilities, establish provisions for public housing, and create a human rights committee. However, it eventually fell through when the local government demanded that it should be passed by a local referendum.

=== George Wallace ===
In May 1964, George Wallace, the segregationist Governor of Alabama, was invited by the DBCA, the city's primary business association, to give a campaign speech in Cambridge. Shortly after his arrival, black protesters appeared to protest his appearance, which incited a riot.

== Aftermath ==
Once the Civil Rights Act of 1964 was passed by Congress, the movement lost all momentum. The federal government had effectively mandated all that the CNAC had been fighting for. As the protests subsided, the National Guard withdrew. Subsequently, Gloria Richardson resigned from the CNAC and relocated to New York City.

== See also ==
- Pine Street Neighborhood Historic District
