= 2020 Senior Bowl =

2020 Reese's Senior Bowl
- 71st Senior Bowl
North Team	South Team
34	17
Head coach: Matt Patricia (Detroit Lions)	Head coach: Zac Taylor (Cincinnati Bengals)
	1	2	3	4	Total
North	0	10	21	3	34
South	7	3	0	7	17
- Date: January 25, 2020
- Season: 2019
- Stadium: Ladd–Peebles Stadium
- Location: Mobile, Alabama
- MVP: Justin Herbert (QB, Oregon)
- Referee: Larry Smith (Big Ten)
- Attendance: 38,252

United States TV coverage
- Network: NFL Network
- Announcers: Booth: Charles Davis, Daniel Jeremiah, Andrew Siciliano; Sidelines: Bucky Brooks, Tom Pelissero

The 2020 Senior Bowl was an all-star college football exhibition game played on January 25, 2020, at 1:30 p.m. CST, at Ladd–Peebles Stadium in Mobile, Alabama. The game featured prospects for the 2020 draft of the professional National Football League (NFL), predominantly from the 2019 NCAA Division I FBS football season, rostered into "North" and "South" teams. It was one of the final 2019–20 bowl games concluding the 2019 FBS football season. It was sponsored by Reese's Peanut Butter Cups and was officially known as the Reese's Senior Bowl, with television coverage provided by NFL Network.

Coaching staffs for the Senior Bowl are selected from NFL teams that did not qualify for the postseason. The Detroit Lions and Cincinnati Bengals were selected to coach in 2020, led by head coaches Matt Patricia and Zac Taylor, respectively. The Lions coached the North team, while the Bengals coached the South team.

This would prove to be the last Senior Bowl played at Ladd–Peebles Stadium. On March 4, 2020, game organizers announced that future editions would remain in Mobile, but move to Hancock Whitney Stadium, set to open in fall 2020 on the campus of the University of South Alabama.

== Players ==
Organizers maintained a "watch list" of hundreds of players, with a maximum of 110 players invited to the game. Players who accepted invitations to the game were listed on the official website, with complete rosters presented below. While team assignments for the North and South squads follow general geographical guidelines, there are usually multiple variances due to competitive and roster-balancing considerations. Players were from FBS programs, unless marked otherwise in the "College" column.

=== North team ===
Full roster online here.

No.	Player	Position	HT/WT	College	Notes	NFL draft round (no.)
72	Trey Adams	OT	6'8/318	Washington		undrafted
78	Hakeem Adeniji	OT	6'4/302	Kansas		6th (180)
58	Bradlee Anae	DE	6'3/257	Utah		5th (179)
25	Darius Anderson	RB	5'10/195	TCU	7 carries, 43 yards; 2 receptions, 87 yards, 1 TD	undrafted
16	Tyler Bass	K	5'10/183	Georgia Southern	2/2 FG, 50 long; 4/4 XP	6th (188)
21	Essang Bassey	CB	5'9/191	Wake Forest		undrafted
56	Zack Baun	OLB	6'2/240	Wisconsin		3rd (74)
13	Francis Bernard	ILB	6'0/230	Utah		undrafted
74	Ben Bredeson	OG	6'4/316	Michigan		4th (143)
26	Terrell Burgess	DB	5'11/192	Utah		3rd (104)
22	Jeremy Chinn	S	6'3/219	Southern Illinois (FCS)		2nd (64)
83	Chase Claypool	WR	6'4/229	Notre Dame	2 receptions, 6 yards, 1 TD	2nd (49)
45	Carter Coughlin	DE	6'3/234	Minnesota		7th (218)
79	Darrion Daniels	DT	6'3/322	Nebraska		undrafted
27	Ashtyn Davis	S	6'1/195	California		3rd (68)
1	Quartney Davis	WR	6'1/199	Texas A&M	4 receptions, 53 yards	undrafted
21	Jalen Elliott	S	6'0/205	Notre Dame		undrafted
99	Leki Fotu	DT	6'5/337	Utah		4th (114)
90	Neville Gallimore	DT	6'2/304	Oklahoma		3rd (82)
11	Antonio Gandy-Golden	WR	6'3/222	Liberty	1 reception, 5 yards, 1 TD	4th (142)
11	Alohi Gilman	S	5'10/202	Notre Dame		6th (186)
3	Anthony Gordon	QB	6'2/199	Washington State	8/12, 69 yards, 2 TD; 1 carry, –3 yards	undrafted
53	DaVon Hamilton	DT	6'3/327	Ohio State		3rd (73)
56	Nick Harris	C	6'1/293	Washington		5th (160)
39	Malik Harrison	ILB	6'2/246	Ohio State	1 INT	3rd (98)
23	JaMycal Hasty	RB	5'8/203	Baylor	3 carries, 25 yards, 1 TD; 2 receptions, 15 yards	undrafted
67	Charlie Heck	OT	6'7/309	North Carolina		4th (126)
58	Matt Hennessy	OL	6'4/302	Temple		3rd (78)
75	Justin Herron	OT	6'3/301	Wake Forest		6th (195)
17	K. J. Hill	WR	6'0/192	Ohio State	2 PR, 20 yards; 1 reception, 1 yard	7th (220)
94	Trevon Hill	DE	6'3/233	Miami (FL)		undrafted
89	Brycen Hopkins	TE	6'3/241	Purdue	2 receptions, 19 yards	4th (136)
4	Khaleke Hudson	S	5'11/218	Michigan		5th (162)
73	Jonah Jackson	OG	6'3/310	Ohio State		3rd (75)
24	Lamar Jackson	CB	6'2/206	Nebraska		undrafted
70	Josh Jones	T	6'5/311	Houston		3rd (72)
2	Joshua Kelley	RB	5'10/214	UCLA	15 carries, 105 yards	4th (112)
5	Jordan Love	QB	6'3/223	Utah State	4/6, 26 yards; 4 carries, 4 yards	1st (26)
34	Braden Mann	P	5'11/190	Texas A&M	4 punts, 196 yards, 49.0 average, 59 long	6th (191)
86	Sean McKeon	TE	6'5/238	Michigan		undrafted
53	Colton McKivitz	OT	6'6/304	West Virginia		5th (153)
14	Josh Metellus	S	5'11/210	Michigan		6th (205)
15	Denzel Mims	WR	6'2/206	Baylor	1 carry, 17 yards; 1 reception, 13 yards	2nd (59)
92	Larrell Murchison	DT	6'2/294	NC State		5th (174)
7	Michael Ojemudia	CB	6'0/199	Iowa		3rd (77)
7	Shea Patterson	QB	6'1/204	Michigan	6/10, 131 yards, 1 TD, 1 INT; 2 carries, 9 yards	undrafted
65	Matt Peart	OT	6'6/310	UConn		3rd (99)
2	Michael Pittman Jr.	WR	6'3/219	USC	did not play (injury)	2nd (34)
5	Troy Pride	CB	5'11/193	Notre Dame	1 INT, 33-yard return	4th (113)
13	James Proche	WR	5'10/196	SMU	1 PR, 3 yards; 1 reception, 17 yards	6th (201)
94	Alton Robinson	DE	6'3/259	Syracuse		5th (148)
55	Jason Strowbridge	DE	6'4/267	North Carolina		5th (154)
88	Charlie Taumoepeau	TE	6'2/244	Portland State (FCS)		undrafted
84	Adam Trautman	TE	6'5/251	Dayton (FCS)	2 receptions, 10 yards	3rd (105)
6	Josh Uche	OLB	6'1/241	Michigan		2nd (60)
89	Evan Weaver	ILB	6'2/234	California		6th (202)
93	Kenny Willekes	DE	6'3/254	Michigan State		7th (225)
30	Logan Wilson	ILB	6'2/241	Wyoming		3rd (65)
33	Steven Wirtel	LS	6'0/237	Iowa State		undrafted

=== South team ===
Full roster online here.

No.	Player	Position	HT/WT	College	Notes	NFL draft round (no.)
4	Brandon Aiyuk	WR	6'1/206	Arizona State	did not play	1st (25)
73	Tremayne Anchrum	OL	6'2/315	Clemson		7th (250)
75	Ben Bartch	OG	6'5/308	Saint John's (D-III)		4th (116)
25	Eno Benjamin	RB	5'9/195	Arizona State	7 carries, 20 yards; 3 receptions, 19 yards	7th (222)
98	Rodrigo Blankenship	K	6'0/187	Georgia	1/2 FG, 25 long; 2/2 XP	undrafted
25	Antoine Brooks	S	5'10/213	Maryland		6th (198)
31	Cam Brown	OLB	6'5/232	Penn State		6th (183)
6	T. J. Brunson	ILB	6'0/219	South Carolina		7th (238)
40	Harrison Bryant	TE	6'4/242	Florida Atlantic		4th (115)
20	Joseph Charlton	P	6'4/240	South Carolina	5 punts, 224 yards, 44.8 average, 60 long	undrafted
40	Josiah Coatney	DT	6'3/309	Ole Miss		undrafted
32	Brian Cole II	S	6'1/205	Mississippi State		7th (249)
79	Lloyd Cushenberry	OL	6'3/312	LSU		3rd (83)
7	Marlon Davidson	DE	6'3/297	Auburn		2nd (47)
24	Akeem Davis-Gaither	OLB	6'1/219	Appalachian State		4th (107)
83	Josiah Deguara	TE	6'2/245	Cincinnati		3rd (94)
23	Kyle Dugger	S	6'2/223	Lenoir-Rhyne (D-II)	2 PR, 16 yards	2nd (37)
6	Devin Duvernay	WR	5'10/202	Texas	2 receptions, 28 yards	3rd (92)
48	Blake Ferguson	LS	6'2/227	LSU		6th (185)
24	Antonio Gibson	RB	6'0/223	Memphis	11 carries, 68 yards	3rd (66)
15	Trevis Gipson	DE	6'3/259	Tulsa		5th (155)
9	A. J. Green	CB	6'1/199	Oklahoma State		undrafted
58	Jonathan Greenard	DE	6'3/262	Florida		3rd (90)
10	Justin Herbert	QB	6'6/227	Oregon	9/12, 83 yards, 1 TD; 3 carries, 22 yards; MVP	1st (6)
17	Darnay Holmes	CB	5'10/192	UCLA		4th (110)
1	Jalen Hurts	QB	6'1/218	Oklahoma	6/13, 58 yards, 1 TD, 1 INT; 6 carries, –7 yards	2nd (53)
60	Keith Ismael	OL	6'3/300	San Diego State		5th (156)
11	Dane Jackson	CB	5'11/180	Pittsburgh		7th (239)
14	Van Jefferson	WR	6'1/197	Florida	1 KR, 34 yards; 2 receptions, 11 yards	2nd (57)
33	Anfernee Jennings	ILB	6'1/252	Alabama		3rd (87)
15	Jauan Jennings	WR	6'3/206	Tennessee	3 receptions, 22 yards, 1 TD	7th (217)
11	Collin Johnson	WR	6'5/221	Texas	2 receptions, 25 yards	5th (165)
95	Benito Jones	DT	6'1/321	Ole Miss		undrafted
3	Javon Kinlaw	DT	6'5/315	South Carolina		1st (14)
68	Damien Lewis	OL	6'2/329	LSU		3rd (69)
24	Terrell Lewis	OLB	6'5/258	Alabama		3rd (84)
16	Kalija Lipscomb	WR	6'0/202	Vanderbilt	2 receptions, 21 yards	undrafted
17	Austin Mack	WR	6'1/212	Ohio State	1 reception, 14 yards	undrafted
21	Jared Mayden	S	5'11/201	Alabama		undrafted
12	Steven Montez	QB	6'4/240	Colorado	3/8, 22 yards, 1 INT; 3 carries, –28 yards	undrafted
2	La'Mical Perine	RB	5'10/211	Florida	7 carries, 42 yards; 2 receptions, 17 yards 1 TD	4th (120)
78	Tyre Phillips	OT	6'5/342	Mississippi State		3rd (106)
80	Jared Pinkney	TE	6'4/254	Vanderbilt		undrafted
22	Reggie Robinson	DB	6'1/202	Tulsa		4th (123)
74	John Simpson	OG	6'4/330	Clemson		4th (109)
65	Terence Steele	OT	6'6/312	Texas Tech		undrafted
71	Logan Stenberg	OG	6'6/317	Kentucky		4th (121)
81	Stephen Sullivan	TE	6'5/254	LSU	1 reception, 6 yards	7th (251)
77	Alex Taylor	OT	6'8/308	South Carolina State (FCS)		undrafted
19	Darrell Taylor	DE	6'3/259	Tennessee		2nd (48)
20	Davion Taylor	OLB	6'0/224	Colorado		3rd (103)
72	Calvin Throckmorton	OL	6'5/309	Oregon		undrafted
5	Ke'Shawn Vaughn	RB	5'9/205	Vanderbilt	did not play (injury)	3rd (76)
2	Kindle Vildor	CB	5'10/185	Georgia Southern	1 INT, 22-yard return	5th (163)
12	K'Von Wallace	S	5'11/199	Clemson		4th (127)
76	Prince Tega Wanogho	OT	6'5/307	Auburn		6th (210)
54	Robert Windsor	DT	6'4/287	Penn State		6th (193)
8	D. J. Wonnum	OLB	6'4/254	South Carolina		4th (117)
92	Jabari Zuniga	DE	6'3/253	Florida		3rd (79)

Quarterback Jalen Hurts was provided with a special helmet for the Senior Bowl, representing Alabama on one side and Oklahoma on the other side, the two college programs that he played for.

== Game summary ==
Note: special playing rules detailed here.

2020 Reese's Senior Bowl

Quarter	1	2	3	4	Total
North	0	10	21	3	34
South	7	3	0	7	17

at Ladd–Peebles Stadium • Mobile, Alabama

- Date: Saturday, January 25, 2020
- Game time: 2:30 p.m. EST (1:30 p.m. CST)
- Game attendance: 38,252
- TV: NFL Network
- ESPN game summary, Official stats packet

Game information

First Quarter

- (10:35) SOUTH – La'Mical Perine 16-yard pass from Justin Herbert, Rodrigo Blankenship kick good (Drive: 7 plays, 65 yards, 4:25, SOUTH 7–0)

Second Quarter

- (14:47) NORTH – Darius Anderson 75-yard pass from Shea Patterson, Tyler Bass kick good (Drive: 2 plays, 88 yards, 0:18, TIED 7–7)
- (1:46) SOUTH – Rodrigo Blankenship 25-yard field goal (Drive: 12 plays, 73 yards, 5:32, SOUTH 10–7)
- (0:16) NORTH – Tyler Bass 41-yard field goal (Drive: 9 plays, 52 yards, 1:30, TIED 10–10)

Third Quarter

- (11:51) NORTH – JaMycal Hasty 11-yard run, Tyler Bass kick good (Drive: 7 plays, 75 yards, 3:09, NORTH 17–10)
- (5:40) NORTH – Chase Claypool 1-yard pass from Anthony Gordon, Tyler Bass kick good (Drive: 8 plays, 36 yards, 3:59, NORTH 24–10)
- (0:29) NORTH – Antonio Gandy-Golden 5-yard pass from Anthony Gordon, Tyler Bass kick good (Drive: 4 plays, 9 yards, 1:10, NORTH 31–10)

Fourth Quarter

- (6:08) SOUTH – Jauan Jennings 18-yard pass from Jalen Hurts, Rodrigo Blankenship kick good (Drive: 3 plays, 22 yards, 0:53, NORTH 31–17)
- (0:00) NORTH – Tyler Bass 50-yard field goal (Drive: 13 plays, 43 yards, 6:08, NORTH 34–17)

=== Statistics ===
Statistics	North	South
First downs	19	20
Total yards	426	280
Rushes–yards	33–200	37–117
Passing yards	226	163
Passing: Comp–Att–Int	18–28–1	18–33–2
Time of possession	32:41	27:19

Team	Category	Player	Statistics
North	Passing	Shea Patterson (Michigan)	6/10, 131 yards, 1TD, 1 INT
North	Rushing	Joshua Kelley (UCLA)	15 carries, 105 yards
North	Receiving	Darius Anderson (TCU)	2 receptions, 87 yards, 1 TD
South	Passing	Justin Herbert (Oregon)	9/12, 83 yards, 1 TD
South	Rushing	Antonio Gibson (Memphis)	11 carries, 68 yards
South	Receiving	Devin Duvernay (Texas)	2 receptions, 28 yards
