= Freedom Highway =

Freedom Highway may refer to:

- Freedom Highway (Rhiannon Giddens album), a 2017 album
- Freedom Highway (The Staple Singers album), a 1965 album
- Freedom Highways campaign
- Down Liberty Road, a 1956 American short film also known as Freedom Highway
