= Maynadier =

Maynadier is a surname. Notable people with the surname include:

- Clément Maynadier (born 1988), French rugby player
- Henry E. Maynadier (died 1868), American military officer

== See also ==
- Herbert Maynadier St. Clair (1868–1949) American businessman, real estate investor, and local politician
