= Gloria Richardson =

American civil rights activist (1922–2021)

- Richardson in 1964
- Born: Gloria St. Clair Hayes; May 6, 1922; Baltimore, Maryland, U.S.
- Died: July 15, 2021 (aged 99); New York City, New York, U.S.
- Education: Howard University (BA)
- Known for: Cambridge movement during 1960s Civil Rights Movement
- Relatives: Herbert M. St. Clair (grandfather)

Gloria Richardson Dandridge (born Gloria St. Clair Hayes; May 6, 1922 – July 15, 2021) was an American civil rights activist best known as the leader of the Cambridge movement, a civil rights action in the early 1960s in Cambridge, Maryland, on the Eastern Shore. Recognized as a major figure in the Civil Rights Movement, she was one of the signatories to "The Treaty of Cambridge", signed in July 1963 with Attorney General Robert F. Kennedy, and state and local officials. It was an effort at reconciliation and commitment to change after a riot the month before.

At the August 1963 March on Washington for Jobs and Freedom, Richardson and five other women were honored by being seated on the stage at the Lincoln Memorial, but none of the women were invited to speak to the crowd. The next year Richardson moved to New York City, where she worked locally in Harlem on civil rights and economic development.

== Early life and education ==
Gloria St. Clair Hayes was born in 1922 to John and Mable (née St. Clair) Hayes in Baltimore, Maryland, the largest city in the state. Her mother was part of the affluent St. Clair family of Cambridge, Maryland, which owned and operated a successful grocery store and funeral home. Her family was also involved in politics. Her maternal grandfather was Herbert M. St. Clair, a businessman, real estate investor, and city council member in Cambridge, Maryland for 50 years, serving from 1912 to 1946. One of Mable's brothers, Fredrick D. St. Clair was a lawyer in the state of Maryland. Her ancestors had been free people of color since before the Civil War. During the constraints of the Great Depression, the Hayes family moved to Cambridge, where Mable had grown up.

From a young age, Gloria had a strong personality nurtured by her parents and maternal grandparents. She developed a strong sense of community and started to form her own views on such human rights issues as racism. She attended a neighborhood public school. Her parents encouraged her to speak up and to be comfortable in front of large groups, such as performing at Sunday school programs. The young Hayes pushed against what her parents considered to be respectable behavior for girls from well-to-do families. Her independence and persistence were later displayed also in her civil rights work. While aware of her family privileges, she realized that her college degree, her family's social position, and their navigation of the color line in Cambridge did not provide her or her family with true protection. Her grandparents always taught her to value people for their actions and not for their socioeconomic status.

The Hayes family was educated and relatively affluent, but still had suffered racial injustice. Most importantly, Gloria's father John Hayes died of a heart attack due to the lack of nearby medical care accessible to blacks. It forced the young woman to realize that racism was a matter of life and death.

Black males had been able to vote in Maryland since emancipation after the American Civil War. (Women were added when the 19th constitutional amendment became effective in 1920.) African Americans in the city of Baltimore were generally segregated into housing in one of five wards, the Second Ward. Within that ward, blacks had built up substantial religious and business communities. They still lived under Maryland state Jim Crow laws and customs in the city at large.

Hayes earned a B.A. in sociology in 1942 from Howard University, a historically black university in Washington, DC. She became involved in social activism as a student protesting with others at the Peoples Drug store near campus because the store refused to hire Black workers. In college, she also picketed a segregated Woolworth's store in the capital, where blacks were not allowed to have lunch at the in-store counter. People were surprised by her leadership and her status as a woman from an elite African-American family. They were used to dealing with poor black women who were less outspoken.

Through her experiences in Washington, she realized that even 50 years of Black participation in the legal system had limited results. She could see that Cambridge was still highly segregated, and learned that Blacks suffered one of the highest unemployment rates for that size city.

== Return to Cambridge ==
After Hayes returned to Cambridge after college, she married Harry Richardson and began to explore civil rights. When the city government hired black people as social workers, they were to serve only black clients in the all-black ward. After she was passed over for a social worker position in the "black" ward, she decided to focus on her family and civic work. In an interview with Robert Penn Warren for his book Who Speaks for the Negro? (1965), Richardson said that in Cambridge, blacks were "the last hired and first fired", a phrase applicable to minorities in other places as well.

When she divorced from Harry Richardson, she was a mother with two daughters. She worked at a pharmacy and grocery store owned by her family in a predominantly Black community. Richardson has said that her motherhood sparked her activist role.

Richardson held a formal office in the Cambridge Nonviolent Coordinating Committee (CNCC). She also served as an adult adviser to the CNCC. At one point she was the only Black woman to head a local civil rights agency. When she became co-chair of the Cambridge Nonviolent Action Committee (CNAC), she began to identify goals beyond desegregation. She sought economic and social justice in housing, education, job opportunity, and health care. While co-chairing CNAC, Richardson gained insight into who to trust in the process of negotiating the expansion of rights of the Black community in Cambridge.

During her early activism, Richardson was arrested three times. When she was first arrested, Judge W. Laird described her tactics as "a disgrace to her family's name", attempting to shame her into silence. She continued to fight back harder. She was known for verbal attacks, describing national leaders as presenting "meaningless smiles" due to their failure to gain substantial change.

== Cambridge movement ==
In December 1961, the Student Nonviolent Coordinating Committee (SNCC) sent Reginald Robinson and William Hansen to Cambridge to organize civil rights actions. SNCC had been contacted by activists in the city. The two young men started sit-ins in February to protest segregated facilities. They targeted movie theaters, bowling alleys, and restaurants. Donna Richardson, Gloria's daughter, was among students who supported the demonstrators. Richardson and Yolanda Sinclair, also mother of a protester, were among parents who wanted to show their support for these actions.

In 1961, a Freedom Ride came to Cambridge. The black city council member had attempted to discourage the campaign by insisting that the city was already desegregated. At first Richardson rarely participated in civil disobedience, because she could not accept the original SNCC nonviolence rules.

By 1962, the Civil Rights movement was picking up steam around the country. Students attempted to desegregate public facilities in Cambridge. At the time, the city had a population of around 11,000, of whom about one-third were Black. The initial protests, including picketing and sit-ins, were peaceful. Although White supremacists attacked demonstrators, police arrested the protestors. The protests did not yield results until Richardson was chosen to lead the movement and CNAC.

On January 13, 1962, the city's Black community held its first civil rights demonstration of the 1960s. Dozens of Black high school students, including Richardson's daughter Donna, joined a number of young men and women from Baltimore's Civic Interest Group (CIG) and Congress of Racial Equality (CORE) and two members of the SNCC. This was a result of weeks of coordinated planning by Cambridge's Black youths. It was viewed as the beginning of Cambridge's civil rights movement. Initially, when Richardson wanted to get involved with the protests, her daughter Donna sent Richardson home until Richardson could guarantee that she would demonstrate nonviolently, as the other individuals had been trained to do. It was a commitment Richardson could not make at the time; therefore, she focused on working with the Black community's secretive and highly efficient intelligence-sharing network, known as the "grapevine". Richardson provided information to CIG and SNCC about how Cambridge's political system operated and the opinions of the Black community. Her daughter acted as a spark in Richardson's activist journey. Through witnessing various demonstrations in support of her daughter's activism, Richardson struggled to remain silent in the face of counter-protestors that mocked the non-violent Civil Rights groups. Richardson was determined to involve herself in these social justice issues. At the time, she ran her family's business, but she decided to become a student again. She attended workshops, and special sessions where activists methodically trained for non-violence, to withstand the hatred of mobs, who often used slurs and demeaning acts to prevent peaceful assembly. This was supposed to be secured by the Constitution.

The March and April demonstrations resulted in a large caseload for the local court system where Richardson and other defendants were tried together. Richardson was one of more than 50 people who stood trial for charges of disorderly conduct. This became known as The Penny Trial and demonstrated how the Cambridge movement disrupted white elites' racial comfort zones. On the issue of violence, Richardson had the outlook that violence is not necessarily the answer, but she does not condemn violence as she believes it is a residue of frustration. She once said that "revolts seemed to be the only thing that America understands, and the nation's racial problems made revolts unavoidable".

In June 1962, Richardson was asked to help organize the Cambridge Nonviolent Action Committee (CNAC), the first adult-led affiliate of SNCC. She became its official spokesperson. The organization had initially formed in March of that year. After CNAC canvassed African-American communities in a survey, they expanded the goals to work for economic equality: to improve housing, education, employment, and healthcare. Many blacks struggled with low wages or unemployment.

The Cambridge movement would be one of the first campaigns to focus on economic rights rather than putting the focus solely on civil rights. Richardson would also be one of the first leaders to publicly question nonviolence as a tactic. Due to the change in focus of the movement, protests demanded both economic and social equality as Richardson wanted to target discrimination and inequity in employment, poor wages, inferior schools, health care, and segregated facilities.

Richardson said in a later interview on why she was committed to CNAC's leadership reflecting the community. "The one thing we did was to emphasize that while you should be educated, that education, degrees, college degrees were not essential [here]. If you could articulate the need, if you knew what that need was, if you were aware of the kinds of games that white folk play that was the real thing".

In the summer of 1962, CNAC focused on voter registration and an effort to get out the vote. They wanted to replace state senator Frederick Malkus, who had opposed legislation that would have allowed additional industries into Dorchester County, Maryland. The lack of industrial jobs limited opportunities for the African-American community.

Richardson was focused on determining the priorities of the Black community, reinforced by a lesson she learned from her grandfather which was to learn about the important issues the members of a community care about most. One of the first things she did was conduct a survey of the Black community to help determine priorities. Data was collected door-to-door and analyzed by faculty at Swarthmore College. The survey collected the following statistics as what residents considered to be the most pressing issue:

- 42% considered it to be jobs
- 26% considered it to be housing
- 21% considered it to be improved schools
- 6% considered it to be open accommodations
- 5% considered it to be police brutality

Before collecting the data, Richardson expected public accommodations to be their biggest concern because it had been the main focus of the protest; however, after analyzing the results, CNAC began a multipronged campaign to encourage black voter registration, increase employment opportunities for black workers, and end racially segregated education by having black parents apply to transfer their children to white schools.

As militant tactics increased and new demands were made, white resistance also increased. Two 15-year-old students, Dwight Cromwell and Dinez White, were arrested for praying outside a segregated facility. Both individuals received indeterminate sentences in a juvenile facility and these sentences resulted in outrage from the Black community. Large marches and protests increased, which were often met by White mobs. This is when the philosophy within the Black community in Cambridge changed from "nonviolent resistance" to "armed self-defense". As Herbert St. Clair, a Black businessman said, "We are not going to initiate violence. But if we are attacked, we are not going to turn the other cheek".

In June 1963 the Cambridge protests had attracted students and other activists from around the country. On June 11, white patrons at Dizzyland had attacked six white and black demonstrators conducting a sit-in there. General Gelston of the National Guard announced that he was changing the rules of martial law: he announced a curfew of 9 p.m. instead of 10, stores were to close at 2 p.m. instead of 9 p.m., firearms were banned, and automobile searches by police and National Guard were authorized.

At 8 p.m. that night 250 African Americans staged a "freedom walk" to the Dorchester County Courthouse. Shortly after the demonstrators stopped to pray, they were attacked and pelted with eggs by crowds of more than 200 white townsfolk. Two carloads of whites drove in and started a gun fight with armed African Americans. State police used tear gas and guns to disperse the mob.

The federal government intervened in an effort to end the violence and protests. Attorney General Robert F. Kennedy and other Justice Department and housing officials brokered a five-point "Treaty of Cambridge", to include a statement for equal rights, that was signed in July. The Attorney General, representatives of the State Of Maryland, local black leadership-including Richardson, and elected Cambridge officials were all signatories.

On June 13, 1963, another mass civil rights march was held. This time, the Black community in Cambridge came with protection. Armed men were protecting the demonstrators and they set up a perimeter around the Black community. The night after, a fight broke out between the White and Black community and there was an exchange of gunshots. Several people were wounded and some White businesses were set on fire. During this series of protests in 1963 is where the famous photograph of Richardson pushing aside the bayonet and rifle of a National Guardsman emerged from.

As a result of the accumulation of protests and demonstrations, the administration of Gov. Milliard J. Tawes offered a plan of gradual desegregation. However, it was rejected by CNAC and Tawes responded by sending in the National Guard for three weeks. After the withdrawal of the National Guard, CNAC resumed protests.

On July 12, a White mob attacked protesters sitting in at a restaurant. The Black residents fought back, but there was another attack later that night. After those incidents, Governor Tawes sent in the National Guard for nearly two years. This was the longest occupation of any community since the Reconstruction period after the American Civil War. Attorney General Robert F. Kennedy arranged a settlement where if the CNAC agreed to stop protesting, then in return there would be an end to segregation in public accommodations, desegregation of public schools, construction of public housing, and implementation of a jobs program funded by the Federal government. This agreement did not last and ended almost immediately when the Dorchester Business and Citizens Association filed referendum petitions to overturn the agreement. Richardson took a controversial stance on the issue as she announced that the CNAC would not be taking part in the referendum. A significant quote that encaptures Richardson's view is when she said that "A first-class citizen does not beg for freedom. A first-class citizen does not plead to the white power structure to give him something that the whites have no power to give or take away. Human rights are human rights, not white rights".

On July 23, the Treaty of Cambridge was signed and it helped local activists secure victories in resources for public housing, the protection of voting rights, and the establishment of a body to investigate Civil Rights violations. During that period of time, national publications wrote stories and reports about why Richardson was ludicrous for opposing a citywide referendum because it supposedly allowed Cambridge citizens to vote on equal access to accommodations and housing. However, Richardson was firm in her belief that her White neighbours should not be deciding on Black rights. Ultimately, she was correct as the referendum was overwhelmingly shot down.

The fight for desegregation also led to victories in union organizations that had failed previously. Richardson claimed that there would often be White members who wanted to educate themselves on the issue and would ask about the civil rights struggle. Many White workers were inspired by the CNAC campaign and recognized the power and leadership it represented. This helped to achieve a certain level of Black and White unity as White workers recognized that the Black struggle for freedom represented new power that would also benefit them. This resulted in an improvement in involvement. Previously, although the Cambridge local consisted of both Black and White members, they were unable to meet due to segregation. Now, the Black trade unionists, with support from White workers, asked CNAC to attend meetings. In fact, there was an incident where the White workers openly showed their support. In a large meeting at the International Ladies' Garment Workers' Union (ILGWU) headquarters in New York, there were people who supported wage discrepancy that were sent to the meeting. When they started to argue, they accused Richardson of being a communist and wanted to remove her from the meeting. However, local white ILGWU members said, "Oh no. If she goes, all of us go," demonstrating their support for Richardson and the CNAC.

Richardson was selected as an honoree at the March on Washington on August 22, 1963. Before she arrived at the event, she was told that she could not wear jeans to the event. To Richardson and other SNCC members, wearing jeans represented their solidarity with the rural poor, and "it was the default uniform when they boycotted department stores for maintaining segregation". However, she compromised and wore a jean skirt. When she arrived she realized her seat on the dais was missing. After finding a place to sit on the platform stage, Richardson was allowed to say "Hello," to the crowd of more than 250,000, before her microphone was cut.

Gloria Richardson played a big role in the Kennedy administration's decision to work with the CNAC as she initiated a series of negotiations to help Cambridge residents come out from under Jim Crow. By the summer of 1963, she was living her "egalitarian philosophies concerning community organizing and democracy", and she was willing to risk her family's standing among the black elite to achieve CNAC's goals. For these reasons, Cambridge's black community acknowledged her as its leader, making her one of few women to achieve that position during the entire civil rights movement. Richardson claimed that people working for the Kennedy administration tried to intimidate her into leaving the movement by threatening to reveal embarrassing gossip about her, including intimate details about her divorce and her affair. Richardson sent word to the administration that if the press ran that story, she would indeed resign from CNAC, but she would not go without a fight. In her personal life, she was not afraid of other people's judgement, including her, at the time, uncommon decision to get a divorce.

In December 1963 Richardson attended a national meeting of SNCC leaders in Atlanta, where they discussed the future direction of the organization. Present were Bob Moses, Charles Sherrod, Frank Smith, John Lewis, Courtland Cox, Michael Thelwell, Stokely Carmichael, Jim Forman, Dottie Zellner, Ivanhoe Donaldson, Marion Barry, and Joyce Ladner, as well as staff and volunteers. Ella Baker and Howard Zinn led questioning to help the mostly young leaders work toward their vision for activism. In Atlanta they discussed and planned for an extended voting rights program to be conducted in the South the next year, an election year.

== After Cambridge movement ==
On July 14, 1963, Governor Tawes met with Richardson and other leaders . He offered to integrate schools, ensure that a Black person was "hired in the State Employment Office, make an application for a federal loan for a "Negro housing project", pass a public accommodations ordinance, and name a biracial commission to work on the other problems that could not be solved immediately by legislation", in exchange for a year-long suspension of civil demonstrations. Richardson rejected committing to stopping demonstrations unless there was a full desegregation of schools and complete fairness in job opportunities. She said, "We wish to make it unalterably clear that we will determine, and not the political structure of the city, who shall speak for the Negro community".

Richardson was criticized during and after the Cambridge movement on her role as a female leader. Many local and national figures said that she should have denounced the violence outright, but she continued to believe in self-defense. Later, Richardson was arrested again. Officials made one attempt to institutionalize her as mentally incompetent, but did not succeed. President John F. Kennedy described Cambridge as a town that had "lost sight of what demonstrations are about" because of the violence that had occurred. But Richardson believed that the people who had been provoked and had endured generations of segregation were going to resist until change was achieved in Cambridge.

Such leaders as Martin Luther King Jr. and John Lewis urged Richardson to be "less confrontational and more compromising," but Richardson refused to comply. She disagreed strongly with King, Kennedy, and many others who mistakenly thought that she was an advocate for violence. She believed in nonviolence as a first step in demonstrations, but encouraged physical force as self-defense if confronted with threats. People around her noted that if Richardson was on "your side, you didn't need anybody else". Many Black church leaders distanced themselves from Richardson, and some movement and local civil rights activists also avoided associating with her. Some people believed her political approach was too intense, and her movement began to falter. Richardson was criticized by most radical Black male activists, who tended to be conservative in terms of gender roles. Her actions were perceived to be inappropriate for a woman.

Richardson's contribution helped to reshape the stereotypical role of women. She expanded the range of female involvement. She laid the groundwork for African Americans as female politicians and feminists, and people of the LGBTQ community. Richardson demonstrated that even women who lived in small towns have a voice.

As a result of this movement, federal dollars began to flow to Cambridge facilities, including parks, schools, streets, public housing, and other projects. However, discrimination against the Black community continued despite the legal end of segregation.

== Later life ==
A month after the meeting with Governor Tawes, Richardson left Cambridge for New York City. She married Frank Dandridge, a photographer she had become acquainted with during the demonstrations, and settled with him there. In New York, Richardson worked at an advertising agency before taking a job with the New York City Department for the Aging. She helped ensure businesses complied with laws that affected seniors. Richardson also was advising the Black Action Federation (BAF), CNAC's successor. BAF was established by former CNAC members because they felt that Cambridge's "white power system was still impeding progress in all areas of Black residents' lives". While largely retiring from public life, she worked with Harlem Youth Opportunities Unlimited and Associated Community Teams. She retired in 2012 at age 90.

In an interview with Gil Noble in 1982, Richardson explained her passion about helping student demonstrators at the beginning of the Cambridge movement. She said that "there was something direct, something real about the way kids waged nonviolent war. This was the first time I saw a vehicle I could work with".

Richardson continued to pay attention and stay engaged in current politics and social justice events. In a 2021 interview with The Washington Post, Richardson recounted that she watched as outrage over the murder of George Floyd prompted thousands to take to the streets. She was frustrated by what seemed like a lack of progress since her own work in the 1960s. But she was pleased by the diversity of persons who supported the racial justice movements. During the years of the Cambridge movement, fellow protestors were predominantly Black, but in the 21st century, she saw a mix of races marching together. She recalled that they marched until the governor called martial law because they believed that that was how to get attention and prevent protests about the same topics another 100 years from now. She believed that these actions remain necessary in America today where Black citizens continue to face inequities in the "criminal justice system, housing, health care, and other areas compared with their White counterparts".

Her legacy is less known than many other women in the movement such as Rosa Parks and Dorothy Height. Lopez Matthews Jr., a historian and digital production librarian at Howard University, believes that she is not well known because "she was a woman who was feisty and who refused to back down. As a society, we tend not to value those traits in women". However, those traits made Richardson a great leader in the civil rights movement, because she did not back down. In the biography, The Struggle is Eternal: Gloria Richardson and Black Liberation, the author, Joseph Fitzgerald, believes that Richardson was not in the Civil Rights movement for a career. Instead, she was in it solely for the purpose of advancing Black liberation. He believes this is the reason why Richardson stepped aside when she felt that she could be of no further meaningful use in the movement. An oral history of Richardson is included in the 2006 book Generation on Fire: Voices of Protest from the 1960s by Jeff Kisseloff; in a review for The Journal of Popular Culture, Ray Schuck writes, "When Gloria Richardson mentions how she and others put red pepper on their legs to deter attack dogs, you understand the enormity of the struggle for equality".

In 2017, the state of Maryland honored her legacy by dedicating February 11 as "Gloria Richardson Day". This made Richardson the only living person in Maryland to have an official day declared by a governor in their honor. Although Richardson was not able to travel as planned to Cambridge's historic Bethel AME Church to be recognized in person, she spoke to the packed church in a live remote broadcast from her apartment. Five months later, a fireside chat was facilitated by Kisha Petticolas, the co-founder of the Eastern Shore Network for Change (ESNC), at the Hyatt Regency Chesapeake Bay Resort in Cambridge. Richardson was a featured speaker at the Reflection's banquet, where her remarks "brought 300 guests to their feet in a sustained standing ovation".

Richardson helped to establish a new image for Black women in the United States. She replaced the image of a long-suffering martyr with the image of a woman as a warrior. When Richardson was asked how she would like to be remembered, she replied: "I guess I would like for them to say I was true to my belief in black people as a race". Today, there is a mural placed left of center next to Dorchester native and Underground Railroad conductor Harriet Tubman of Gloria boldly demanding justice.

She died in New York on July 15, 2021.

== Bibliography ==
- Kisseloff, Jeff (2006). "Gloria Richardson Dandridge: The Militant". Generation on Fire: Voices of Protest from the 1960s, An Oral History. Lexington, Kentucky: University Press of Kentucky. pp. 51–63. ISBN 9780813171562.
- Ransby, Barbara (2003). Ella Baker and the Black Freedom Movement: A Radical Democratic Vision. University of North Carolina Press. ISBN 9780807862704.
- Rasmussen, Fred (February 23, 1997). "'Glorious Gloria' Led the Battle Struggle". The Baltimore Sun.
- Warren, Robert Penn. "Gloria St. Clair Hayes Richardson". Robert Penn Warren's Who Speaks for the Negro?: An Archival Collection. Vanderbilt University.
