= Matt Hennessy =

American football player (born 1997)

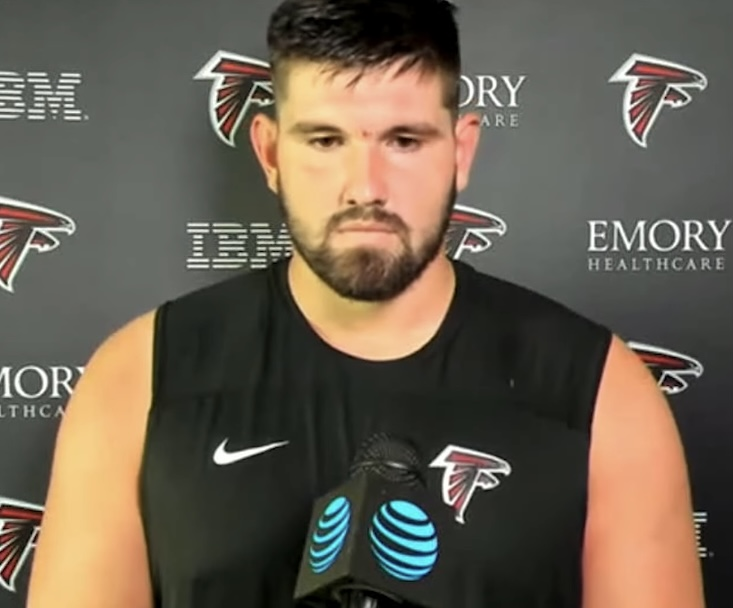
- Hennessy in 2020

No. 72 – Dallas Cowboys
- Position: Center
- Roster status: Injured reserve

Personal information
- Born: November 17, 1997 (age 29); Nyack, New York, U.S.
- Listed height: 6 ft 4 in (1.93 m)
- Listed weight: 315 lb (143 kg)

Career information
- High school: Don Bosco Prep(Ramsey, New Jersey)
- College: Temple (2016–2019)
- NFL draft: 2020: 3rd round, 78th overall pick

Career history
- Atlanta Falcons (2020–2023); Philadelphia Eagles (2024)*; Atlanta Falcons (2024); San Francisco 49ers (2024–2025); Dallas Cowboys (2026–present)
- * Offseason or practice squad member only

Awards and highlights
- Third-team All-American (2019); First-team All-AAC (2019)

Career NFL statistics as of 2025
- Games played: 64
- Games started: 24
- Stats at Pro Football Reference

Matthew Connor Hennessy (born November 17, 1997) is an American professional football center for the Dallas Cowboys of the National Football League (NFL). He played college football for the Temple Owls.

== Early life ==
Hennessy was born in Nyack, New York and grew up in Bardonia, New York. He attended Don Bosco Preparatory High School in Ramsey, New Jersey and was a starter at offensive tackle as a junior and senior for the Ironmen. A 3-star offensive tackle recruit according to Rivals.com, Hennessy committed to play college football at Temple over offers from Air Force, Army, Florida Atlantic, Old Dominion, and Yale, among others.

== College career ==
Hennessy played in three games with one start at left guard as a true freshman before redshirting the rest of the season. He became the Owls' starting center going into his redshirt freshman year, starting all but one game that he missed due to injury. Hennessy was awarded a single-digit jersey (number three) as one of the nine toughest players on the team going into his redshirt sophomore year, which he wore in practice as offensive line are not eligible to wear single digit numbers in-game. He started eleven games, missing two due to injury. Hennessy started 12 games at center for the Owls as a redshirt junior and was named first-team All-American Athletic Conference, second-team All-American by USA Today and to the third-team by the Associated Press and was named a finalist for the Rimington Trophy. Following the end of the season, Hennessy announced that he would forgo his final season of NCAA eligibility to enter the 2020 NFL draft. Having graduated in December of his redshirt junior year, Hennessy was invited to and played in the 2020 Senior Bowl.

== Professional career ==
Pre-draft measurables
| Height | Weight | Arm length | Hand span | Wingspan | 40-yard dash | 10-yard split | 20-yard split | 20-yard shuttle | Three-cone drill | Vertical jump | Broad jump | Bench press |
|---|---|---|---|---|---|---|---|---|---|---|---|---|
| 6 ft 3 7/8 in (1.93 m) | 307 lb (139 kg) | 32 1/4 in (0.82 m) | 10 in (0.25 m) | 6 ft 7 3/4 in (2.03 m) | 5.18 s | 1.80 s | 3.03 s | 4.60 s | 7.45 s | 30.0 in (0.76 m) | 9 ft 2 in (2.79 m) | 23 reps |
All values from NFL Combine

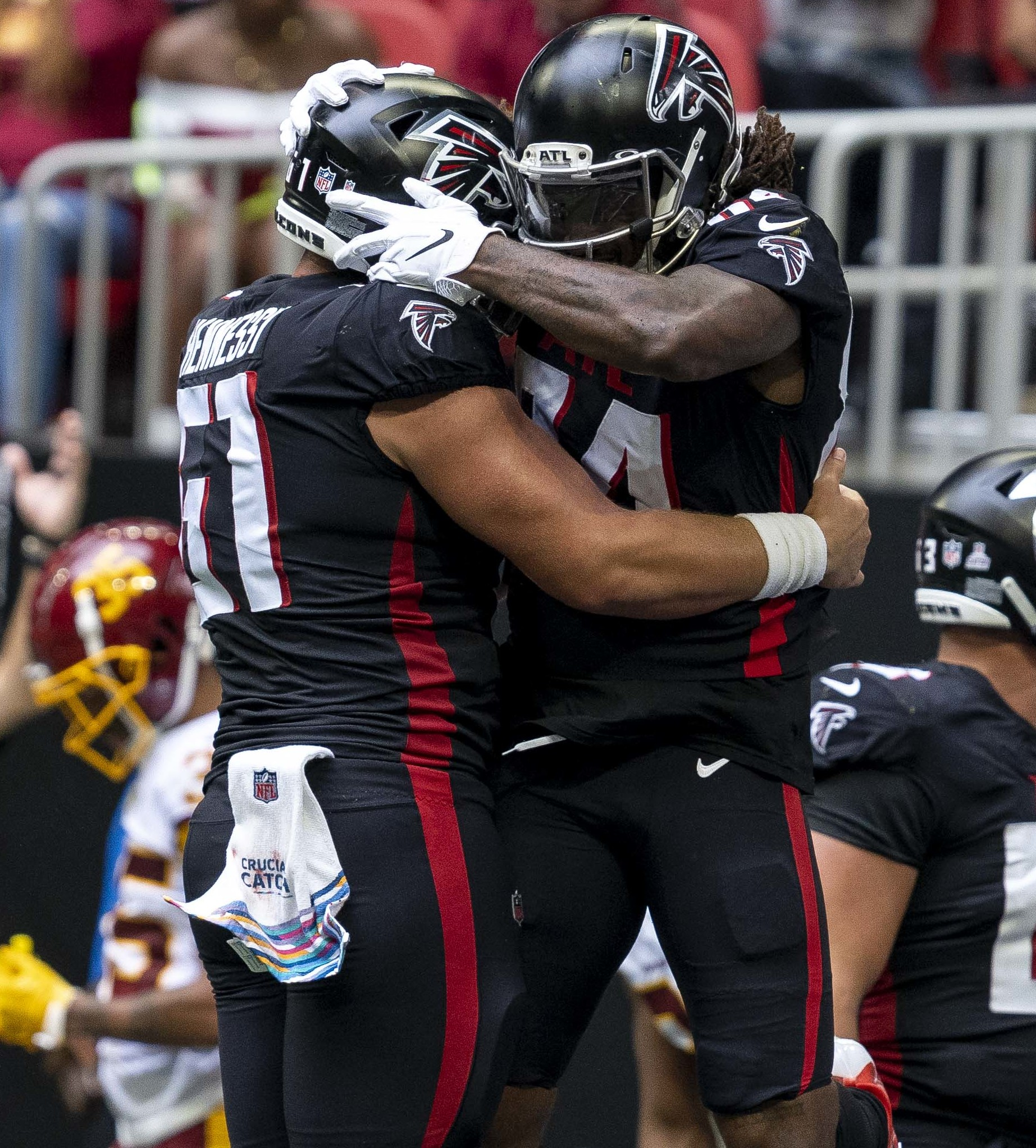
Hennessy and Cordarrelle Patterson in 2021

=== Atlanta Falcons ===
Hennessy was selected by the Atlanta Falcons in the third round of the 2020 NFL draft with the 78th overall selection.

After playing behind Alex Mack as a rookie, Hennessy was named the Falcons starting center in 2021 and started every game. He started Week 9 at left guard before suffering a knee injury. He was placed on injured reserve on November 8, 2022. He was activated on December 31 and he started the final two games of the season at left guard.

In 2023, Hennessy suffered a knee injury in training camp and was placed on injured reserve on August 16, 2023.

=== Philadelphia Eagles ===
On March 13, 2024, Hennessy signed a one-year contract with the Philadelphia Eagles. He was released on August 27.

=== Atlanta Falcons (second stint) ===
On September 24, 2024, with starting center Drew Dalman going to injured reserve, the Falcons signed Hennessy to their practice squad. He was promoted to the active roster on October 15. He was waived on November 14, and re-signed to the practice squad.

=== San Francisco 49ers ===
On December 26, 2024, Hennessy signed a two-year deal with the San Francisco 49ers off the Falcons practice squad.

=== Dallas Cowboys ===
On March 13, 2026, Hennessy signed a one-year contract with the Dallas Cowboys. On June 18, Hennessy was placed on season-ending injured reserve following surgery for a neck injury.

== Personal life ==
Hennessy's older brother, Thomas Hennessy, is the long snapper for the New York Jets. Matt and his brother grew up New York Giants fans.
