= 2019 American Athletic Conference football season =

- League: NCAA Division I Football Bowl Subdivision
- Sport: Football
- Duration: August 29, 2019 through January 2020
- Teams: 12
- TV partner(s): ABC, ESPN, ESPN2, ESPNU, and CBS Sports Network

2020 NFL Draft
- Top draft pick: Antonio Gibson (Memphis)
- Picked by: Washington Redskins, 66th overall

Regular season
- East champions: Cincinnati
- East runners-up: UCF
- West champions: Memphis; Navy
- West runners-up: SMU

The American Championship
- Champions: Memphis
- Runners-up: Cincinnati

Football seasons
- 2018 2020

2019 American Athletic Conference football standings
	Conf.			Overall
Team	W		L	W		L
East Division
No. 21 Cincinnati xy	7	–	1	11	–	3
No. 24 UCF	6	–	2	10	–	3
Temple	5	–	3	8	–	5
South Florida	2	–	6	4	–	8
East Carolina	1	–	7	4	–	8
UConn	0	–	8	2	–	10
West Division
No. 17 Memphis xy$	7	–	1	12	–	2
No. 20 Navy x	7	–	1	11	–	2
SMU	6	–	2	10	–	3
Tulane	3	–	5	7	–	6
Houston	2	–	6	4	–	8
Tulsa	2	–	6	4	–	8
Championship: Memphis 29, Cincinnati 24
$ – Conference champion; x – Division champion/co-champions; y – Championship game participant; Rankings from AP Poll

The 2019 American Athletic Conference football season is the 28th NCAA Division I FBS Football season of the American Athletic Conference (The American). The season is the seventh since the former Big East Conference dissolved and became the American Athletic Conference and the sixth season of the College Football Playoff in place. The American is considered a member of the Group of Five (G5) together with Conference USA (C–USA), the Mid-American Conference (MAC), the Mountain West Conference and the Sun Belt Conference.

== Preseason ==
=== Impending departure of UConn ===
The most significant development in the conference during the 2019 preseason was the announcement that UConn would leave The American after the 2019–20 school year to join several of its former conference rivals in the current non-football iteration of the Big East Conference. The move was first reported on June 21, 2019, by a Boston-area sports news website and quickly picked up by national media outlets. On June 27, the Big East and UConn jointly confirmed the Huskies' impending conference move, but that announcement did not specify a date. The Huskies' Big East entrance date was confirmed for July 1, 2020 after UConn and The American reached a buyout agreement. At the time this agreement was announced, UConn also announced that its football team would become an FBS independent once it joined the Big East.

=== Recruiting classes ===
Rankings
Team	ESPN	Rivals	24/7
Cincinnati		78	79
East Carolina		82	75
Houston		97	72
Memphis	70	59	66
Navy		82	123
SMU	65	69	69
South Florida	72	65	78
Temple			104
Tulane		91	95
Tulsa			109
UCF	50	55	57
UConn			126

=== American Athletic Conference Media Days ===
The American Athletic Conference conducted its 2019 American Athletic Conference media day on July 17 in Newport, Rhode Island.

==== Preseason Media Poll ====
The preseason Poll was released at the 2019 American Media Day on July 16, 2019.

East
Predicted finish	Team	Votes (1st place)
1	UCF	169 (17)
2	Cincinnati	157 (11)
3	South Florida	107
4	Temple	101
5	East Carolina	66
6	UConn	30

West
Predicted finish	Team	Votes (1st place)
1	Memphis	165 (15)
2	Houston	162 (14)
3	Tulane	108
4	SMU	87 (1)
5	Navy	70
6	Tulsa	38

American Champion Voting

- UCF (12)
- Cincinnati (8)
- Memphis (6)
- Houston (4)

== Head coaches ==
=== Coaching changes ===
On November 29, 2018, East Carolina fired head coach Scottie Montgomery. On December 3, 2018, ECU hired James Madison head coach Mike Houston as their new head coach.

On December 7, 2018, Geoff Collins left Temple to become head coach at Georgia Tech. On December 13, 2018, The Owls initially named Miami defensive coordinator Manny Diaz as the new head coach. However, on December 30, 2018, Diaz left to return to Miami as head coach after Mark Richt's retirement. On January 10, 2019, Temple announced Rod Carey as head coach.

On December 30, 2018 Major Applewhite was fired after a blowout loss in the 2018 Armed Forces Bowl. Houston replaced Applewhite by hiring Dana Holgorsen from West Virginia.

=== Coaches ===
Note: All stats current through the completion of the 2019 season

Team	Head coach	Years at school	Overall record	Record at school	AAC record
Cincinnati	Luke Fickell	3	32–20 (.615)	26–13 (.667)	15–9 (.625)
East Carolina	Mike Houston	1	84–33 (.718)	4–8 (.333)	1–7 (.125)
Houston	Dana Holgorsen	1	65–49 (.570)	4–8 (.333)	2–6 (.250)
Memphis	Mike Norvell	3	38–15 (.717)	38–15 (.717)	24–8 (.750)
Navy	Ken Niumatalolo	12	98–60 (.620)	98–60 (.620)	27–13 (.675)
SMU	Sonny Dykes	1	56–56 (.500)	15–11 (.577)	10–6 (.625)
South Florida	Charlie Strong	3	74–53 (.583)	21–16 (.568)	31–22 (.585)
Temple	Rod Carey	1	60–35 (.632)	8–5 (.615)	5–3 (.625)
Tulane	Willie Fritz	4	177–96 (.648)	23–27 (.460)	12–20 (.375)
Tulsa	Philip Montgomery	5	25–37 (.403)	25–37 (.403)	14–26 (.350)
UCF	Josh Heupel	2	22–4 (.846)	22–4 (.846)	14–2 (.875)
UConn	Randy Edsall	15	102–134 (.432)	80–100 (.444)	24–48 (.333)

== Rankings ==
		Pre	Wk 2	Wk 3	Wk 4	Wk 5	Wk 6	Wk 7	Wk 8	Wk 9	Wk 10	Wk 11	Wk 12	Wk 13	Wk 14	Wk 15	Final
Cincinnati	AP	RV						25	21	17	17	17	17	18	21	23	21
Cincinnati	C	RV						RV	21	18	17	17	17	17	21	22	21
Cincinnati	CFP	Not released									20	17	19	19	20	21	
East Carolina	AP																
East Carolina	C																
East Carolina	CFP	Not released															
Houston	AP																
Houston	C	RV															
Houston	CFP	Not released															
Memphis	AP	RV						23	RV	24	19	18	18	17	16	15	17
Memphis	C	RV				RV	23т	20	RV	23	19	18	18	18	16	15	17
Memphis	CFP	Not released									21	18	18	18	17	17	
Navy	AP									RV	25	21	RV	24	23	21	20
Navy	C					RV		RV	RV	RV	25	21	RV	24	23	21	20
Navy	CFP	Not released									24	23			24	23	
SMU	AP					RV	24	21	19	15	23	20	21	RV	RV	RV	RV
SMU	C				RV	RV	RV	22	19	14	23	20	21	RV	RV	RV	RV
SMU	CFP	Not released									25		25				
South Florida	AP																
South Florida	C																
South Florida	CFP	Not released															
Temple	AP				RV												
Temple	C	RV			RV			RV	25			RV			RV		
Temple	CFP	Not released															
Tulane	AP					RV	RV	RV	RV								
Tulane	C					RV	RV	RV	RV								
Tulane	CFP	Not released															
Tulsa	AP																
Tulsa	C																
Tulsa	CFP	Not released															
UCF	AP	17	18	17	15	22	18	RV	RV	RV	RV					RV	24
UCF	C	17т	17	16	16	23	19	RV	RV	RV	RV				RV	RV	24
UCF	CFP	Not released															
UConn	AP																
UConn	C																
UConn	CFP	Not released															

Legend
	Improvement in ranking
	Drop in ranking
	Not ranked previous week
	No change in ranking from previous week
RV	Received votes but were not ranked in Top 25 of poll
т	Tied with team above or below also with this symbol

== Schedule ==
Index to colors and formatting
American member won
American member lost
American teams in **bold**

=== Regular season ===
The regular season began on August 29, 2019, and will end on December 14. As a result of the calendar, all teams except Navy will have two bye weeks.

==== Week 1 ====
Date	Time	Visiting team	Home team	Site	TV	Result	Attendance	Ref.
August 29	7:00 p.m.	UCLA	**Cincinnati**	Nippert Stadium • Cincinnati, OH	ESPN	**W** 24–14	38,032	
August 29	7:00 p.m.	Wagner	**UConn**	Rentschler Field • East Hartford, CT	ESPN3	**W** 24–21	19,648	
August 29	7:00 p.m.	Florida A&M	No. 17 **UCF**	Spectrum Stadium • Orlando, FL	CBSSN	**W** 62–0	44,073	
August 29	7:00 p.m.	FIU	**Tulane**	Yulman Stadium • New Orleans, LA	ESPN3	**W** 42–14	16,361	
August 30	7:15 p.m.	**Tulsa**	No. 18 Michigan State	Spartan Stadium • East Lansing, MI	FS1	**L** 7–28	72,005	
August 30	7:00 p.m.	No. 19 Wisconsin	**South Florida**	Raymond James Stadium • Tampa, FL	ESPN	**L** 0–49	46,704	
August 31	12:00 p.m.	**East Carolina**	NC State	Carter–Finley Stadium • Raleigh, NC (rivalry)	ACCN	**L** 6–34	57,633	
August 31	12:00 p.m.	Ole Miss	**Memphis**	Liberty Bowl Memorial Stadium • Memphis, TN (rivalry)	ABC	**W** 15–10	44,107	
August 31	12:00 p.m.	Bucknell	**Temple**	Lincoln Financial Field • Philadelphia, PA	ESPN3	**W** 56–12	26,378	
August 31	3:30 p.m.	Holy Cross	**Navy**	Navy-Marine Corps Memorial Stadium • Annapolis, MD	CBSSN	**W** 45–7	28,531	
August 31	7:00 p.m.	**SMU**	Arkansas State	Centennial Bank Stadium • Jonesboro, AR	ESPN+	**W** 37–30	22,076	
September 1	7:30 p.m.	**Houston**	No. 4 Oklahoma	Gaylord Family Oklahoma Memorial Stadium • Norman, OK	ABC	**L** 31–49	84,534	
^{#}Rankings from AP Poll released prior to game. All times are in Eastern Time.

==== Week 2 ====
Date	Time	Visiting team	Home team	Site	TV	Result	Attendance	Ref.
September 7	11:00 a.m.	Southern	**Memphis**	Liberty Bowl Memorial Stadium • Memphis, TN	WMCTV	**W** 55–24	34,487	
September 7	12:00 p.m.	**Cincinnati**	No. 5 Ohio State	Ohio Stadium • Columbus, OH	ABC	**L** 0–42	104,089	
September 7	2:00 p.m.	**South Florida**	Georgia Tech	Bobby Dodd Stadium • Atlanta, GA	ACCN	**L** 10–14	46,599	
September 7	3:30 p.m.	Illinois	**UConn**	Rentschler Field • East Hartford, CT	CBSSN	**L** 23–31	23,108	
September 7	6:00 p.m.	Gardner–Webb	**East Carolina**	Dowdy–Ficklen Stadium • Greenville, NC	ESPN3	**W** 48–9	34,118	
September 7	7:00 p.m.	No. 17 **UCF**	Florida Atlantic	FAU Stadium • Boca Raton, FL	CBSSN	**W** 48–14	30,811	
September 7	7:00 p.m.	North Texas	**SMU**	Gerald J. Ford Stadium • University Park, TX (Safeway Bowl)	ESPN3	**W** 49–27	22,766	
September 7	7:30 p.m.	**Tulane**	No. 10 Auburn	Jordan–Hare Stadium • Auburn, AL (rivalry)	ESPN2	**L** 6–24	85,317	
September 7	8:00 p.m.	Prairie View A&M	**Houston**	TDECU Stadium • Houston, TX	ESPN3	**W** 37–17	29,360	
September 7	8:00 p.m.	**Tulsa**	San Jose State	CEFCU Stadium • San Jose, CA	ESPN3	**W** 34–16	12,471	
^{#}Rankings from AP Poll released prior to game. All times are in Eastern Time.

Date	Bye Week	
September 7	Navy	Temple

==== Week 3 ====
Date	Time	Visiting team	Home team	Site	TV	Result	Attendance	Ref.
September 13	9:15 p.m.	No. 20 Washington State	**Houston**	NRG Stadium • Houston, TX (Texas Kickoff)	ESPNU	**L** 24–31	40,523	
September 14	12:00 p.m.	No. 21 Maryland	**Temple**	Lincoln Financial Field • Philadelphia, PA	CBSSN	**W** 20–17	30,610	
September 14	12:00 p.m.	Miami (OH)	**Cincinnati**	Nippert Stadium • Cincinnati, OH (Victory Bell)	ESPNU	**W** 35–13	35,526	
September 14	3:30 p.m.	Oklahoma State	**Tulsa**	H. A. Chapman Stadium • Tulsa, OK (rivalry)	ABC/ESPN/ESPN2	**L** 21–40	28,612	
September 14	3:30 p.m.	**East Carolina**	**Navy**	Navy-Marine Corps Memorial Stadium • Annapolis, MD	CBSSN	**NAVY** 42–10	30,707	
September 14	3:30 p.m.	Stanford	No. 17 **UCF**	Spectrum Stadium • Orlando, FL	ABC/ESPN/ESPN2	**W** 42–27	45,008	
September 14	3:30 p.m.	**Memphis**	South Alabama	Ladd–Peebles Stadium • Mobile, AL	ESPNU	**W** 42–6	12,373	
September 14	3:30 p.m.	South Carolina State	**South Florida**	Raymond James Stadium • Tampa, FL	ESPN3	**W** 55–16	31,368	
September 14	7:00 p.m.	Texas State	**SMU**	Gerald J. Ford Stadium • University Park, TX	ESPN3	**W** 47–17	17,469	
September 14	7:30 p.m.	Missouri State	**Tulane**	Yulman Stadium • New Orleans, LA	ESPN3	**W** 58–6	18,746	
^{#}Rankings from AP Poll released prior to game. All times are in Eastern Time.

Date	Bye Week
September 14	UConn

==== Week 4 ====
Date	Time	Visiting team	Home team	Site	TV	Result	Attendance	Ref.
September 19	8:00 p.m.	**Houston**	**Tulane**	Yulman Stadium • New Orleans, LA	ESPN	**TUL** 38–31	21,032	
September 21	12:00 p.m.	**UConn**	Indiana	Memorial Stadium • Bloomington, IN	BTN	**L** 3–38	40,084	
September 21	3:30 p.m.	No. 15 **UCF**	Pittsburgh	Heinz Field • Pittsburgh, PA	ABC	**L** 34–35	42,056	
September 21	3:30 p.m.	**SMU**	No. 25 TCU	Amon G. Carter Stadium • Fort Worth, TX (Battle for the Iron Skillet)	FS1	**W** 41–38	41,250	
September 21	3:30 p.m.	Wyoming	**Tulsa**	H. A. Chapman Stadium • Tulsa, OK	CBSSN	**W** 24–21	16,246	
September 21	3:30 p.m.	**Temple**	Buffalo	UB Stadium • Buffalo, NY	ESPNU	**L** 22–38	17,621	
September 21	6:00 p.m.	William & Mary	**East Carolina**	Dowdy-Ficklen Stadium • Greenville, NC	ESPN3	**W** 19–7	38,094	
^{#}Rankings from AP Poll released prior to game. All times are in Eastern Time.

Date	Bye Week			
September 21	Cincinnati	Memphis	Navy	USF

==== Week 5 ====
Date	Time	Visiting team	Home team	Site	TV	Result	Attendance	Ref.
September 26	8:00 p.m.	**Navy**	**Memphis**	Liberty Bowl Memorial Stadium • Memphis, TN	ESPN	**MEM** 35–23	33,909	
September 28	3:30 p.m.	Georgia Tech	**Temple**	Lincoln Financial Field • Philadelphia, PA	CBSSN	**W** 24–2	31,094	
September 28	4:00 p.m.	**SMU**	**South Florida**	Raymond James Stadium • Tampa, FL	ESPNU	**SMU** 48–21	28,850	
September 28	5:00 p.m.	**Cincinnati**	Marshall	Joan C. Edwards Stadium • Huntington, WV	CBSSN on Facebook	**W** 52–14	32,192	
September 28	6:00 p.m.	**East Carolina**	Old Dominion	S.B. Ballard Stadium • Norfolk, VA	ESPN+	**W** 24–21	18,643	
September 28	7:00 p.m.	**UConn**	No. 22 **UCF**	Spectrum Stadium • Orlando, FL (Civil Conflict)	CBSSN	**UCF** 56–21	44,164	
September 28	8:00 p.m.	**Houston**	North Texas	Apogee Stadium • Denton, TX	CBSSN on Facebook	**W** 46–25	30,123	
^{#}Rankings from AP Poll released prior to game. All times are in Eastern Time.

Date	Bye Week	
September 28	Tulane	Tulsa

==== Week 6 ====
Date	Time	Visiting team	Home team	Site	TV	Result	Attendance	Ref.
October 3	8:00 p.m.	**Temple**	**East Carolina**	Dowdy–Ficklen Stadium • Greenville, NC	ESPN	**TEM** 27–17	33,253	
October 4	8:00 p.m.	No. 18 **UCF**	**Cincinnati**	Nippert Stadium • Cincinnati, OH	ESPN	**CIN** 27–24	40,121	
October 5	12:00 p.m.	**South Florida**	**UConn**	Rentschler Field • East Hartford, CT	CBSSN	**USF** 48–22	18,038	
October 5	12:00 p.m.	**Tulane**	Army	Michie Stadium • West Point, NY	CBSSN	**W** 42–33	38,019	
October 5	3:30 p.m.	Air Force	**Navy**	Navy-Marine Corps Memorial Stadium • Annapolis, MD (Commander-in-Chief's Trophy)	CBSSN	**W** 34–25	37,957	
October 5	3:45 p.m.	**Memphis**	Louisiana–Monroe	Malone Stadium • Monroe, LA	ESPNU	**W** 52–33	17,143	
October 5	7:30 p.m.	**Tulsa**	No. 24 **SMU**	Gerald J. Ford Stadium • University Park, TX	ESPNU	**SMU** 43–37 ^{3OT}	28,142	
^{#}Rankings from AP Poll released prior to game. All times are in Eastern Time.

*Note: The UConn/USF Kickoff was moved to noon as a safety precaution after receiving guidance from the Connecticut Department of Public Health regarding the mosquito-borne eastern equine encephalitis virus.

Date	Bye Week
October 5	Houston

==== Week 7 ====
Date	Time	Visiting team	Home team	Site	TV	Result	Attendance	Ref.
October 12	12:00 p.m.	No. 23 **Memphis**	**Temple**	Lincoln Financial Field • Philadelphia, PA	ESPN2	**TEM** 30–28	34,253	
October 12	3:30 p.m.	No. 25 **Cincinnati**	**Houston**	TDECU Stadium • Houston, TX	ESPN2	**CIN** 38–23	25,716	
October 12	3:30 p.m.	BYU	**South Florida**	Raymond James Stadium • Tampa, FL	CBSSN	**W** 27–23	35,375	
October 12	3:45 p.m.	**UConn**	**Tulane**	Yulman Stadium • New Orleans, LA	ESPNU	**TULN** 49–7	17,040	
October 12	7:30 p.m.	**Navy**	**Tulsa**	H. A. Chapman Stadium • Tulsa, OK	ESPNU	**NAV** 45–17	17,951	
^{#}Rankings from AP Poll released prior to game. All times are in Eastern Time.

Date	Bye Week		
October 12	East Carolina	SMU	UCF

==== Week 8 ====
Date	Time	Visiting team	Home team	Site	TV	Result	Attendance	Ref.
October 19	12:00 p.m.	Houston	**UConn**	Rentschler Field • East Hartford, CT	ESPNU	**HOU** 24–17	19,760	
October 19	3:30 p.m.	Temple	No. 19 **SMU**	Gerald J. Ford Stadium • University Park, TX	ESPN2	**SMU** 45–21	23,132	
October 19	3:30 p.m	South Florida	**Navy**	Navy-Marine Corps Memorial Stadium • Annapolis, MD	CBSSN	**NAV** 35–3	29,774	
October 19	3:30 p.m.	Tulsa	No. 21 **Cincinnati**	Nippert Stadium • Cincinnati, Ohio	ESPNU	**CIN** 24–13	33,209	
October 19	7:00 p.m.	East Carolina	**UCF**	Spectrum Stadium • Orlando, FL (rivalry)	CBSSN	**UCF** 41–28	42,906	
October 19	7:00 p.m.	Tulane	**Memphis**	Liberty Bowl Memorial Stadium • Memphis, TN	ESPN2	**MEM** 47–17	30,221	
^{#}Rankings from AP Poll released prior to game. All times are in Eastern Time.

==== Week 9 ====
Date	Time	Visiting team	Home team	Site	TV	Result	Attendance	Ref.
October 24	8:30 p.m.	No. 16 SMU	Houston	TDECU Stadium • Houston, TX (rivalry)	ESPN	**SMU** 34–31	24,543	
October 26	3:30 p.m.	**UConn**	UMass	Warren McGuirk Alumni Stadium • Amherst, MA (rivalry)	NESN	**W** 56–35	12,234	
October 26	3:30 p.m.	**Tulane**	**Navy**	Navy-Marine Corps Memorial Stadium • Annapolis, MD	CBSSN	**NAVY** 41–38	31,118	
October 26	3:45 p.m.	**South Florida**	**East Carolina**	Dowdy–Ficklen Stadium • Greenville, NC	ESPNU	**USF** 45–20	33,088	
October 26	7:00 p.m.	**UCF**	**Temple**	Lincoln Financial Field • Philadelphia, PA	ESPN2	**UCF** 63–21	29,949	
October 26	7:00 p.m.	**Memphis**	**Tulsa**	Skelly Field at H.A. Chapman Stadium • Tulsa, OK	CBSSN	**MEM** 42–41	17,183	
^{#}Rankings from AP Poll released prior to game. All times are in Eastern Time.

Date	Bye Week
October 26	Cincinnati

==== Week 10 ====
Date	Time	Visiting team	Home team	Site	TV	Result	Attendance	Ref.
November 1	8:00 p.m.	**Navy**	**UConn**	Rentschler Field • East Hartford, CT	ESPN2	**NAVY** 56–10	16,659	
November 2	12:00 p.m.	**Houston**	**UCF**	Spectrum Stadium • Orlando, FL	ESPN2	**UCF** 44–29	41,361	
November 2	4:00 p.m.	**Tulsa**	**Tulane**	Yulman Stadium • New Orleans, LA	ESPN2	**TULN** 38–26	27,417	
November 2	7:00 p.m.	No. 17 **Cincinnati**	**East Carolina**	Dowdy–Ficklen Stadium • Greenville, NC	CBSSN	**CIN** 46–43	32,276	
November 2	7:30 p.m.	No. 15 **SMU**	No. 24 **Memphis**	Liberty Bowl Memorial Stadium • Memphis, TN	ABC	**MEM** 54–48	59,506	
^{#}Rankings from AP Poll released prior to game. All times are in Eastern Time.

Date	Bye Week	
November 2	South Florida	Temple

==== Week 11 ====
Date	Time	Visiting team	Home team	Site	TV	Result	Attendance	Ref.
November 7	8:00 p.m.	**Temple**	**South Florida**	Raymond James Stadium • Tampa, FL	ESPN	**TEM** 17–7	26,214	
November 8	7:00 p.m.	**UCF**	**Tulsa**	H. A. Chapman Stadium • Tulsa, OK	ESPN2	**TUL** 34–31	16,331	
November 9	12:00 p.m.	**East Carolina**	**SMU**	Gerald J. Ford Stadium • University Park, TX	ESPNU	**SMU** 59–51	29,528	
November 9	3:30 p.m.	**UConn**	No. 17 **Cincinnati**	Nippert Stadium • Cincinnati, OH	CBSSN	**CIN** 48–3	38,919	
^{#}Rankings from AP Poll released prior to game. All times are in Eastern Time.

Date	Bye Week			
November 9	Houston	Memphis	Navy	Tulane

==== Week 12 ====
Date	Time	Visiting team	Home team	Site	TV	Result	Attendance	Ref.
November 16	12:00 p.m.	**Tulane**	**Temple**	Lincoln Financial Field • Philadelphia, PA	ESPNU	**TEM** 29–21	27,850	
November 16	2:30 p.m.	**Navy**	No. 16 Notre Dame	Notre Dame Stadium • South Bend, IN (rivalry)	NBC	**L** 20–52	74,082	
November 16	3:30 p.m.	No. 18 **Memphis**	**Houston**	TDECU Stadium • Houston, TX	ESPN2	**MEM** 45–27	25,149	
November 16	7:00 p.m.	No. 17 **Cincinnati**	**South Florida**	Raymond James Stadium • Tampa, FL	CBSSN	**CIN** 20–17	29,112	
^{#}Rankings from AP Poll released prior to game. All times are in Eastern Time.

Date	Bye Week				
November 16	East Carolina	SMU	UCF	UConn	Tulsa

==== Week 13 ====
Date	Time	Visiting team	Home team	Site	TV	Result	Attendance	Ref.
November 23	12:00 p.m.	**UCF**	**Tulane**	Yulman Stadium • New Orleans, LA	CBSSN	**UCF** 34–31	21,032	
November 23	12:00 p.m.	**East Carolina**	**UConn**	Rentschler Field • East Hartford, CT	ESPN3	**ECU** 31–24	12,084	
November 23	3:30 p.m.	No. 25 **SMU**	**Navy**	Navy-Marine Corps Memorial Stadium • Annapolis, MD (Gansz Trophy)	CBSSN	**NAVY** 35–28	33,732	
November 23	4:00 p.m.	No. 18 **Memphis**	**South Florida**	Raymond James Stadium • Tampa, FL	ESPNU	**MEM** 49–10	25,136	
November 23	7:00 p.m.	**Temple**	No. 19 **Cincinnati**	Nippert Stadium • Cincinnati, OH	ESPN2	**CIN** 15–13	30,101	
November 23	7:30 p.m.	**Houston**	**Tulsa**	H. A. Chapman Stadium • Tulsa, OK	ESPNU	**HOU** 24–14	16,120	
^{#}Rankings from AP Poll released prior to game. All times are in Eastern Time.

==== Week 14 ====
Date	Time	Visiting team	Home team	Site	TV	Result	Attendance	Ref.
November 29	3:30 p.m.	No. 19 **Cincinnati**	No. 18 **Memphis**	Liberty Bowl Memorial Stadium • Memphis, TN	ABC	**MEM** 24–34	36,472	
November 29	8:00 p.m.	**South Florida**	**UCF**	Spectrum Stadium • Orlando, FL (War on I–4)	ESPN	**UCF** 34–7	45,217	
November 30	12:00 p.m.	**Tulsa**	**East Carolina**	Dowdy–Ficklen Stadium • Greenville, NC	CBSSN	TUL 49–24	27,978	
November 30	3:00 p.m.	**UConn**	**Temple**	Lincoln Financial Field • Philadelphia, PA	ESPNU	TEM 49–17	26,068	
November 30	3:00 p.m.	**Tulane**	**SMU**	Gerald J. Ford Stadium • University Park, TX	ESPNU	SMU 37–20	20,731	
November 30	7:00 p.m.	**Navy**	**Houston**	TDECU Stadium • Houston, TX	ESPN2	**NAVY** 56–41	22,824	
^{#}Rankings from AP Poll released prior to game. All times are in Eastern Time.

==== Week 15 (American Athletic Conference Championship) ====
Date	Time	Visiting team	Home team	Site	TV	Result	Attendance	Ref.
December 7	3:30 p.m.	No. 20 Cincinnati	No. 17 Memphis	Liberty Bowl Memorial Stadium • Memphis, TN	ABC	**MEM** 29–24	33,008	
^{#}Rankings from AP Poll released prior to game. All times are in Eastern Time.

==== Week 16 ====
Date	Time	Visiting team	Home team	Site	TV	Result	Attendance	Ref.
December 14	3:00 p.m.	**Navy**	Army	Lincoln Financial Field • Philadelphia, PA (Commander-in-Chief's Trophy)	CBS	**W** NAVY 31–7	68,705	
^{#}Rankings from AP Poll released prior to game. All times are in Eastern Time.

== Postseason ==
=== Bowl games ===
Legend
American win
American loss

Bowl game	Date	Site	Television	Time (EST)	American team	Opponent	Score	Attendance
Boca Raton Bowl	December 21	FAU Stadium • Boca Raton, FL	ABC	3:30 p.m.	SMU	Florida Atlantic	28–52	23,187
Gasparilla Bowl	December 23	Raymond James Stadium • Tampa, FL	ESPN	2:30 p.m.	UCF	Marshall	48–25	28,987
Military Bowl	December 27	Navy–Marine Corps Memorial Stadium • Annapolis, MD	ESPN	12:00 p.m.	Temple	North Carolina	13–55	24,242
Liberty Bowl	December 31	Liberty Bowl Memorial Stadium • Memphis, TN	ESPN	3:45 p.m.	No. 23 Navy	Kansas State	20–17	50,515
Birmingham Bowl	January 2, 2020	Legion Field • Birmingham, AL	ESPN	3:00 p.m.	No. 21 Cincinnati	Boston College	38–6	27,193
Armed Forces Bowl	January 4, 2020	Amon G. Carter Stadium • Fort Worth, TX	ESPN	11:30 a.m.	Tulane	Southern Miss	30–13	38,513
New Year's Six Bowl
Cotton Bowl Classic	December 28	AT&T Stadium • Arlington, TX	ESPN	12:00 p.m.	No. 17 Memphis	No. 10 Penn State	39–53	54,828

Rankings are from AP Poll. All times Eastern.

=== Selection of teams ===
- Bowl eligible: Cincinnati, Memphis, Navy, SMU, Temple, Tulane, UCF,
- Bowl-ineligible: Houston, East Carolina, South Florida, Tulsa, UConn

== The American vs other conferences ==
=== The American vs Power 5 matchups ===
This is a list of games The American has scheduled versus power conference teams (ACC, Big 10, Big 12, Pac-12, Notre Dame and SEC). Although the NCAA does not consider BYU a "Power Five" school, the ACC considers games against BYU as satisfying its "Power Five" scheduling requirement. Though the American does not consider BYU a power 5 team they consider them an equally strength opponent. All rankings are from the current AP Poll at the time of the game.

Date	Conference	Visitor	Home	Site	Score
August 29	Pac-12	UCLA	Cincinnati	Nippert Stadium • Cincinnati, OH	W 24–14
August 30	Big Ten	No. 19 Wisconsin	South Florida	Raymond James Stadium • Tampa, FL	L 0–49
August 30	Big Ten	Tulsa	No. 18 Michigan State	Spartan Stadium • East Lansing, MI	L 7–28
August 31	SEC	Ole Miss	Memphis	Liberty Bowl Memorial Stadium • Memphis, TN	W 15–10
August 31	ACC	East Carolina	NC State	Carter–Finley Stadium • Raleigh, NC	L 6–34
September 1	Big 12	Houston	No. 4 Oklahoma	Gaylord Family Oklahoma Memorial Stadium • Norman, OK	L 31–49
September 7	Big Ten	Cincinnati	No. 5 Ohio State	Ohio Stadium • Columbus, OH	L 0–42
September 7	ACC	South Florida	Georgia Tech	Bobby Dodd Stadium • Atlanta, GA	L 10–14
September 7	Big Ten	Illinois	UConn	Rentschler Field • East Hartford, CT	L 23–31
September 7	SEC	Tulane	No. 10 Auburn	Jordan–Hare Stadium • Auburn, AL	L 6–24
September 13	Pac-12	Washington State	Houston	NRG Stadium • Houston, TX	L 24–31
September 14	Big Ten	Maryland	Temple	Lincoln Financial Field • Philadelphia, PA	W 20–17
September 14	Pac-12	Stanford	UCF	Spectrum Stadium • Orlando, FL	W 42–27
September 14	Big 12	Oklahoma State	Tulsa	H. A. Chapman Stadium • Tulsa, OK	L 21–40
September 21	Big 12	SMU	No. 25 TCU	Amon G. Carter Stadium • Fort Worth, TX	W 41–38
September 21	Big Ten	UConn	Indiana	Memorial Stadium • Bloomington, IN	L 3–38
September 21	ACC	No. 15 UCF	Pittsburgh	Heinz Field • Pittsburgh, PA	L 34–35
September 28	ACC	Georgia Tech	Temple	Lincoln Financial Field • Philadelphia, PA	W 24–2
November 16	Independent	Navy	Notre Dame	Notre Dame Stadium • Notre Dame, IN	L 20–52

=== The American vs Group of Five matchups ===
The following games include The American teams competing against teams from the C-USA, MAC, Mountain West or Sun Belt.

Date	Conference	Visitor	Home	Site	Score
August 29	C-USA	FIU	Tulane	Yulman Stadium • New Orleans, LA	W 42–14
August 31	Sun Belt	SMU	Arkansas State	Centennial Bank Stadium • Jonesboro, AR	W 37–30
September 7	C-USA	No. 17 UCF	Florida Atlantic	FAU Stadium • Boca Raton, FL	W 48–14
September 7	Mountain West	San Jose State	Tulsa	CEFCU Stadium • San Jose, CA	W 34–16
September 7	C-USA	North Texas	SMU	Gerald J. Ford Stadium • Dallas, TX	W 49–27
September 14	MAC	Miami (OH)	Cincinnati	Nippert Stadium • Cincinnati, OH	W 35–13
September 14	Sun Belt	Memphis	South Alabama	Ladd–Peebles Stadium • Mobile, AL	W 42–6
September 14	Sun Belt	Texas State	SMU	Gerald J. Ford Stadium • Dallas, TX	W 47–17
September 21	MAC	Temple	Buffalo	UB Stadium • Buffalo, NY	L 22–38
September 21	Mountain West	Wyoming	Tulsa	Skelly Field at H. A. Chapman Stadium • Tulsa, OK	W 24–21
September 28	C-USA	Cincinnati	Marshall	Joan C. Edwards Stadium • Huntington, VA	W 52–14
September 28	C-USA	East Carolina	Old Dominion	S.B. Ballard Stadium • Norfolk, VA	W 24–21
September 28	C-USA	Houston	North Texas	Apogee Stadium • Denton, TX	W 46–25
October 5	Sun Belt	Memphis	Louisiana–Monroe	Malone Stadium • Monroe, LA	W 52–33
October 5	Mountain West	Air Force	Navy	Navy–Marines Corps Memorial Stadium • Annapolis, MD	W 34–25

=== The American vs FBS independents matchups ===
The following games include The American teams competing against FBS independents other than Notre Dame, which is universally considered a Power Five program, or BYU, which some but not all Power Five leagues consider to be a Power Five opponent for non-conference scheduling purposes. Of the remaining four independents, two are on American member schedules—Army and UMass.

Date	Visitor	Home	Site	Score
October 6	Tulane	Army	Mitchie Stadium • West Point, NY	W 42–33
October 12	BYU	South Florida	Raymond James Stadium • Tampa, FL	W 27–23
October 26	UConn	UMass	Warren McGuirk Alumni Stadium • Amherst, MA	W 56–35
December 14	Navy	Army	Lincoln Financial Field • Philadelphia, PA	W 31–7

=== The American vs FCS matchups ===
Date	Visitor	Home	Site	Score
August 29	Wagner	UConn	Rentschler Field • East Hartford, CT	W 24–21
August 29	Florida A&M	No. 17 UCF	Spectrum Stadium • Orlando, FL	W 62–0
August 31	Bucknell	Temple	Lincoln Financial Field • Philadelphia, PA	W 56–12
August 31	Holy Cross	Navy	Navy–Marine Corps Memorial Stadium • Annapolis, MD	W 45–7
September 7	Gardner–Webb	East Carolina	Dowdy–Ficklen Stadium • Greenville, SC	W 48–7
September 7	Prairie View A&M	Houston	TDECU Stadium • Houston, TX	W 37–17
September 7	Southern	Memphis	Liberty Bowl Memorial Stadium • Memphis, TN	W 55–24
September 14	South Carolina State	South Florida	Raymond James Stadium • Tampa, FL	W 55–16
September 14	Missouri State	Tulane	Yulman Stadium • New Orleans, LA	W 58–6
September 21	William & Mary	East Carolina	Dowdy-Ficklen Stadium • Greenville, NC	W 19–7

=== Records against other conferences ===
Regular Season

Power 5 Conferences	Record
ACC	1–3
Big Ten	1–5
Big 12	1–2
BYU/Notre Dame	1–1
Pac-12	2–1
SEC	1–1
Power 5 Total	7–13
Other FBS Conferences	Record
C–USA	6–0
Independents (Excluding BYU/Notre Dame)	2–0
MAC	1–1
Mountain West	3–0
Sun Belt	4–0
Other FBS Total	16–1
FCS Opponents	Record
Football Championship Subdivision	10–0
Total Non-Conference Record	33–14

Post Season

Power Conferences 5	Record
ACC	1–1
Big Ten	0–1
Big 12	1–0
BYU/Notre Dame	0–0
Pac-12	0–0
SEC	0–0
Power 5 Total	2–2
Other FBS Conferences	Record
C–USA	2–1
Independents (Excluding BYU/Notre Dame)	0–0
MAC	0–0
Mountain West	0–0
Sun Belt	0–0
Other FBS Total	2–1
Total Bowl Record	4–3

== Awards and honors ==
=== Player of the week honors ===
Week	Offensive			Defensive			Specialist		
Week	Player	Team	Position	Player	Team	Position	Player	Team	Position
Week 1 (Sept. 2)	Justin McMillan	Tulane	QB	Bryce Huff	Memphis	DE	C.J. Sanders	SMU	WR/KR
Week 2 (Sept. 9)	Xavier Jones	SMU	RB	Patrick Nelson	SMU	LB	Dalton Witherspoon	Houston	PK
Week 3 (Sept. 16)	Dillon Gabriel; Malcolm Perry	UCF; Navy	QB	Harrison Hand	Temple	CB	Adam Williams	Memphis	P
Week 4 (Sept. 23)	Jalen McCleskey	Tulane	WR	Cooper Edmiston	Tulsa	LB	Jake Verity	East Carolina	PK
Week 5 (Sept. 30)	Desmond Ridder; Shane Buechele	Cincinnati; SMU	QB	Benny Walls	Temple	S	Gabriel Rogers	Memphis	KR
Week 6 (Oct. 7)	James Proche	SMU	WR	Jarell White	Cincinnati	LB	James Smith	Cincinnati	P
Week 7 (Oct. 14)	Malcolm Perry (2)	Navy	QB	Ja'Von Hicks	Cincinnati	S	Will Mobley	Temple	PK
Week 8 (Oct. 21)	Kenneth Gainwell; Shane Buechele (2)	Memphis; SMU	RB; QB	Jacob Springer	Navy	LB	Dane Roy	Houston	P
Week 9 (Oct. 28)	Kevin Mensah; Jamale Carothers	UConn; Navy	RB	Patrick Nelson (2)	SMU	LB	Bijan Nichols	Navy	PK
Week 10 (Nov. 4)	Antonio Gibson	Memphis	WR	P.J. Hall	Tulane	S	Riley Patterson	Memphis	PK
Week 11 (Nov. 11)	Tyler Snead	East Carolina	WR	Reggie Robinson	Tulsa	CB	Thomas Bennett	Tulsa	P
Week 12 (Nov. 18)	Brady White	Memphis	QB	Quincy Roche	Temple	DB	Sam Crosa	Cincinnati	PK
Week 13 (Nov. 25)	Malcolm Perry (2)	Navy	QB	Darrick Forrest	Cincinnati	S	Dane Roy (2)	Houston	P
Week 14 (Dec. 1)	Jamale Carothers	Navy	FB	Bryce Huff (2)	Memphis	DE	Chris Claybrooks	Memphis	CB/KR

=== American Athletic Individual Awards ===
The following individuals received postseason honors as voted by the American Athletic Conference football coaches at the end of the season

Award	Player	School
Offensive Player of the Year	Malcolm Perry, Sr, QB	Navy
Defensive Player of the Year	Quincy Roche, Jr, DL	Temple
Special Teams Player of the Year	Dane Roy Sr., P Antonio Gibson, WR/PR	Houston; Memphis
Rookie of the Year	Kenneth Gainwell, RB	Memphis
Coach of the Year	Ken Niumatalolo	Navy

=== All-conference teams ===
Position	Player	Team
First Team Offense
WR	Gabe Davis, Jr.	UCF
WR	Marquez Stevenson, Jr.	Houston
WR	*James Proche, Sr.	SMU
OT	Jake Brown Sr.	UCF
OT	Matt Peart, Sr.	UConn
OG	Morgan James, Gr.	Cincinnati
OG	David Forney Sr.	Navy
C	Matt Hennessy, Jr.	Temple
TE	Josiah Deguara, Gr.	Cincinnati
QB	Malcolm Perry, Sr.	Navy
QB	Shane Buechele, Jr.	SMU
RB	*Kenneth Gainwell, Fr.	Memphis
RB	Xavier Jones, Sr.	SMU
First Team Defense
DL	Elijah Ponder Jr.	Cincinnati
DL	Ifeanyi Maijeh, So.	Temple
DL	Quincy Roche, Jr.	Temple
DL	Trevis Gipson, Sr.	Tulsa
LB	Bryan Wright, Gr.	Cincinnati
LB	Perry Young Sr.	Cincinnati
LB	Diego Fagot, So.	Navy
LB	Patrick Nelson Sr.	SMU
LB	Shaun Bradley, Sr.	Temple
CB	Sauce Gardner, Fr.	Cincinnati
CB	Reggie Robinson, Sr.	Tulsa
S	Richie Grant, Jr.	UCF
S	Darrick Forrest, Jr.	Cincinnati
First Team Special Teams
K	Riley Patterson, Jr.	Memphis
P	Dane Roy Sr.	Houston
RS	Antonio Gibson	Memphis

Position	Player	Team
Second Team Offense
WR	Damonte Coxie, Jr.	Memphis
WR	Antonio Gibson	Memphis
WR	Jaden Blue, So.	Temple
OT	Josh Jones, Sr.	Houston
OT	Jaylon Thomas, So.	SMU
OG	Cole Schneider, So.	UCF
OG	Jovahn Fair, Gr.	Temple
C	Dustin Woodard, Sr.	Memphis
TE	Joey Magnifico Sr.	Memphis
TE	Kylen Granson, Jr.	SMU
QB	Brady White, Jr.	Memphis
RB	Adrian Killins, Sr.	UCF
RB	Michael Warren II, Jr.	Cincinnati
RB	Shamari Brooks Jr.	Tulsa
Second Team Defense
DL	Brendon Hayes Sr.	UCF
DL	Kendall Futrell Sr.	East Carolina
DL	Bryce Huff, Sr.	Memphis
DL	Delontae Scott, Sr.	SMU
LB	Nate Evans Sr.	UCF
LB	Patrick Johnson, Jr.	Tulane
LB	Cooper Edmiston Sr.	Tulsa
LB	Zaven Collins, So.	Tulsa
CB	Aaron Robinson, Jr.	UCF
CB	KJ Sails Jr.	South Florida
S	Grant Stuard, Jr.	Houston
S	Rodney Clemons Sr.	SMU
Second Team Special Teams
K	Jake Verity, Jr.	East Carolina
P	James Smith Jr.	Cincinnati
RS	C. J. Sanders, Sr.	SMU

*Denotes Unanimous Selection

All Conference Honorable Mentions:

- UCF: Otis Anderson Jr. (RB), Nevelle Clarke (CB), Tre Nixon (WR), Kenny Turnier (DL)
- Cincinnati: Sam Crosa (K), Ja'Von Hicks (S)
- ECU: CJ Johnson (WR), D'Ante Smith (OT)
- Memphis: T.J. Carter (CB), Joseph Dorceus (DL), O'Bryan Goodson (DL), Austin Hall (LB), Dylan Parham (OG)
- Navy: Billy Honaker (OT), Jacob Springer (LB)
- South Florida: Mitchell Wilcox (TE)
- Tulane: Corey Dublin (OG), BoPete Keyes (CB), P.J. Hall (S)

=== All-Americans ===
The 2019 College Football All-America Teams are composed of the following College Football All-American first teams chosen by the following selector organizations: Associated Press (AP), Football Writers Association of America (FWAA), American Football Coaches Association (AFCA), Walter Camp Foundation (WCFF), The Sporting News (TSN), Sports Illustrated (SI), USA Today (USAT) ESPN, CBS Sports (CBS), FOX Sports (FOX) College Football News (CFN), Bleacher Report (BR), Scout.com, Phil Steele (PS), SB Nation (SB), Athlon Sports, Pro Football Focus (PFF) and Yahoo! Sports (Yahoo!).

Currently, the NCAA compiles consensus all-America teams in the sports of Division I-FBS football and Division I men's basketball using a point system computed from All-America teams named by coaches associations or media sources. The system consists of three points for a first-team honor, two points for second-team honor, and one point for third-team honor. Honorable mention and fourth team or lower recognitions are not accorded any points. Football consensus teams are compiled by position and the player accumulating the most points at each position is named first team consensus all-American. Currently, the NCAA recognizes All-Americans selected by the AP, AFCA, FWAA, TSN, and the WCFF to determine Consensus and Unanimous All-Americans. Any player named to the First Team by all five of the NCAA-recognized selectors is deemed a Unanimous All-American.

Position	Player	School	Selector	Unanimous	Consensus
First Team All-Americans
DL	Quincy Roche	Temple	SI		

Position	Player	School	Selector	Unanimous	Consensus
Second Team All-Americans
WR	James Proche	SMU	FWAA		
C	Matt Hennessy	Temple	USAT		
AP	Kenneth Gainwell	Memphis	AFCA, TSN		
DL	Quincy Roche	Temple	USAT, TSN		

Position	Player	School	Selector	Unanimous	Consensus
Third Team All-Americans
C	Matt Hennessy	Temple	AP		

*AFCA All-America Team (AFCA)
*Walter Camp Football Foundation All-America Team (WCFF)
*Associated Press All-America Team (AP)
*The Sporting News All-America Team (TSN)
*Football Writers Association of America All-America Team (FWAA)
*Sports Illustrated All-America Team (SI)
*Bleacher Report All-America Team (BR)
*College Football News All-America Team (CFN)
*ESPN All-America Team (ESPN)
*CBS Sports All-America Team (CBS)
*Athlon Sports All-America Team (Athlon)

=== National award winners ===
2019 College Football Award Winners

== NFL draft ==
The following list includes all AAC players who were drafted in the 2020 NFL draft.

Round #	Pick #	NFL team	Player	Position	College
3	66	Washington Redskins	Antonio Gibson	RB	Memphis
3	72	Arizona Cardinals	Josh Jones	OT	Houston
3	78	Atlanta Falcons	Matt Hennessy	C	Temple
3	94	Green Bay Packers	Josiah Deguara	TE	Cincinnati
3	99	New York Giants	Matt Peart	OT	UConn
4	123	Dallas Cowboys	Reggie Robinson	CB	Tulsa
4	128	Buffalo Bills	Gabe Davis	WR	UCF
5	155	Chicago Bears	Trevis Gipson	OLB	Tulsa
5	169	Minnesota Vikings	Harrison Hand	CB	Temple
5	173	Chicago Bears	Darnell Mooney	WR	Tulane
6	196	Philadelphia Eagles	Shaun Bradley	LB	Temple
6	201	Baltimore Ravens	James Proche	WR	SMU
7	223	Jacksonville Jaguars	Chris Claybrooks	CB	Memphis
7	230	New England Patriots	Dustin Woodard	C	Memphis
7	237	Kansas City Chiefs	BoPete Keyes	CB	Tulane
7	241	Tampa Bay Buccaneers	Chapelle Russell	OLB	Temple
7	246	Miami Dolphins	Malcolm Perry	RB	Navy
