= Herbert M. St. Clair =

American businessman (1868–1949)

Herbert St. Clair Sr.
- Born: Herbert Maynadier St. Clair; February 1, 1868; Cambridge, Maryland, U.S.
- Died: April 12, 1949 (aged 81); Cambridge, Maryland, U.S.
- Burial place: Waugh Cemetery, Cambridge, Maryland, U.S.
- Other names: H. Maynaidier St. Clair, Herbert Maynaidier Saintclair, Maynie St. Clair, H.M. St. Clair
- Occupations: Businessman, city councilman, real estate investor
- Political party: Republican
- Spouse: Fannie Estella Wilson
- Children: 3
- Relatives: Gloria Richardson (granddaughter)

Herbert "Maynie" Maynadier St. Clair Sr. (February 1, 1868 – April 12, 1949), commonly known as H.M. St. Clair, was an American businessman, and city councilman in Cambridge, Maryland. He was an African American Republican, and one of the wealthiest people in Cambridge, Maryland in his lifetime. St. Clair was an alternate delegate to the 1912 and 1920 Republican National Conventions; and served on the Cambridge City Council for more than 50 years.

== Early life and family ==
Herbert Maynadier St. Clair was born on February 1, 1868, in Cambridge, Maryland. His father Cyrus St. Clair had been a businessman and owned the largest butchery in the city. The family were members of the Waugh United Methodist Church, in Cambridge. Herbert St. Clair married Fannie Estella Wilson of Crisfield, Maryland, and together they had two sons and one daughter. They lived in an eight-bedroom house at the corner of High and Muir streets.

His son Frederick Douglass St. Clair (1900–1932), was a lawyer and civil rights activist, that died at a young age from Typhoid fever. The Frederick Douglass St. Clair High School in Cambridge was named after him when it opened in 1932. However the school burned down in a fire in 1952, and was succeeded by Mace's Lane High School.

== Career ==
After his father Cyrus' death, St. Clair inherited the butchery business, and eventually sold it. He founded a grocery store and an undertaking business. St. Clair also invested in real estate in Cambridge, which served as rental properties. He was active in the African American branch of the Knights of Pythias.

St. Clair served on the Cambridge City Council from 1894 until 1946, representing the second ward. St. Clair was the second African American to hold the city council role, the first being Nehemiah Henry in 1906. He was also the only Black member of the Cambridge City Council through most of the early 20th century. Throughout his tenure in city council, St. Clair was nonproductive and accused of working in collaboration with the Phillips Packing Company (1902–1957), a local cannery of tomatoes which employed many of Cambridge's people, and held city control from the 1920s until World War II.

His son Herbert Jr. attempted to take his father's seat at city council in 1946, but was not elected, with Charles Cornish winning the seat.

St. Clair died at age 81 on April 12, 1949, in a hospital in Cambridge, Maryland; he had fracture his skull after a car accident. He was the grandfather of civil rights activist Gloria Richardson (1922–2021).

== See also ==
- Pine Street Neighborhood Historic District
