= Josh Jones (offensive lineman) =

American football player (born 1997)

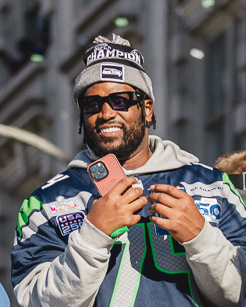
- Jones at the Super Bowl LX parade

No. 74 – Seattle Seahawks
- Position: Offensive tackle
- Roster status: Active

Personal information
- Born: June 22, 1997 (age 29); Houston, Texas, U.S.
- Listed height: 6 ft 7 in (2.01 m)
- Listed weight: 339 lb (154 kg)

Career information
- High school: George Bush (Richmond, Texas)
- College: Houston (2015–2019)
- NFL draft: 2020: 3rd round, 72nd overall pick

Career history
- Arizona Cardinals (2020–2022); Houston Texans (2023); Baltimore Ravens (2024); Seattle Seahawks (2025–present)

Awards and highlights
- Super Bowl champion (LX); Second-team All-AAC (2019)

Career NFL statistics as of 2025
- Games played: 90
- Games started: 27
- Stats at Pro Football Reference

Joshua Jones (born June 22, 1997) is an American professional football offensive tackle for the Seattle Seahawks of the National Football League (NFL). He played college football for the Houston Cougars and was selected by the Arizona Cardinals in the third round of the 2020 NFL draft.

== Early life ==
Jones grew up in Richmond, Texas and attended George Bush High School, where he played basketball and football. He was named second-team All-District 23-5A as a sophomore and to the first-team in his junior and senior seasons. Rated a three-star recruit, Jones originally committed to play college football at Oklahoma State going into his senior year. Jones de-committed from the school several days before National Signing Day and then announced his decision to attend Houston.

== College career ==
Jones redshirted his true freshman season. Jones started all 13 of the Cougars's games as a redshirt freshman and ten the following season, missing two games due to a knee injury. He started all 13 of Houston's contests again as a redshirt junior. As a redshirt senior, Jones started nine games at left tackle and was named second-team All-American Athletic Conference. Following the end of the season, Jones was invited to play in the 2020 Senior Bowl.

== Professional career ==
Pre-draft measurables
Height	Weight	Arm length	Hand span	Wingspan	40-yard dash	10-yard split	20-yard split	Vertical jump	Broad jump	Bench press	Wonderlic
6 ft 5 in (1.96 m)	319 lb (145 kg)	33 7/8 in (0.86 m)	10 1/8 in (0.26 m)	6 ft 7 7/8 in (2.03 m)	5.27 s	1.81 s	3.03 s	28.5 in (0.72 m)	9 ft 1 in (2.77 m)	24 reps	14
All values from NFL Combine

=== Arizona Cardinals ===
Jones was selected by the Arizona Cardinals in the third round with the 72nd overall pick in the 2020 NFL draft.

=== Houston Texans ===
On August 24, 2023, Jones was traded, along with a 2024 seventh-round pick, to the Houston Texans in exchange for a 2024 fifth-round pick.

=== Baltimore Ravens ===
On March 21, 2024, Jones signed with the Baltimore Ravens.

=== Seattle Seahawks ===
On March 13, 2025, Jones signed with the Seattle Seahawks on a one-year, $4.75 million contract. He recorded his first start since the 2023 season, when he was with the Houston Texans, in Seattle's Week 16 matchup against the Los Angeles Rams.

On March 12, 2026, Jones re-signed with the Seahawks on a one-year, $4 million contract.
