= Ivanhoe Donaldson =

American civil rights activist (1941–2016)

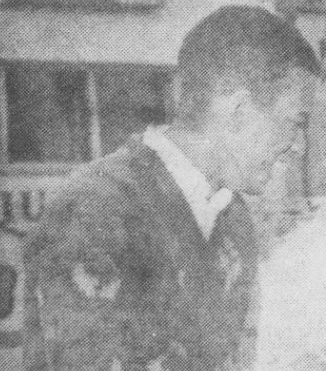
- Donaldson in a 1962 publication of The Atlanta Inquirer
- Born: October 17, 1941; Harlem, New York City, US
- Died: April 3, 2016 (aged 74); Washington, D.C., US
- Education: Michigan State University
- Children: 1

Ivanhoe Donaldson (October 17, 1941 – April 3, 2016) was an American civil rights activist and political advisor.

== Biography ==
Donaldson was born on October 17, 1941, in Harlem, and raised in the Bronx. Of Jamaican descent, his father was a police officer and his mother was a bookworm, who named him for Ivanhoe by Walter Scott. He advocated civil rights beginning during his attendance to Andrew Jackson High School. He studied engineering at Michigan State University. While attending, he ran track and field, wrote for the school's newspaper, and met Malcolm X at an event in his freshman year. In December 1962, he and his roommate brought food and medicine to sharecroppers in Clarksdale, Mississippi, after the Mississippi government refused to send them food. After they arrived, they slept in their truck; they were arrested by police after being found, and were released a week later on a $15,000 bond, paid for by the NAACP.

In 1963, Donaldson joined the Student Nonviolent Coordinating Committee, serving as a field secretary. He faced violence, such as having a police officer putting a gun in his mouth after he encouraged black men to vote, and having to escape a lynch mob. He opposed the March on Washington, saying it "didn't accomplish much". After Freedom Summer, which he also opposed, he moved to Columbus, Ohio. Donaldson operated in socialist circles, and was described as "boisterous" and a "militant".

Donaldson managed the campaign for Julian Bond in 1965, in his election to the Georgia House of Representatives. He participated in the Selma to Montgomery marches. He moved to Washington, D.C. in 1965, and in 1968, he formed the company Afro-American Resources, which operated the Drum and Spear Bookstore. He lectured at the University of Massachusetts Amherst in 1970. Under Marion Barry, he was a deputy mayor of the Department of Employment Services and Economic Developemtn. Also an advisor to Barry, he was nicknamed his "alter ego". He left government in late 1983 and became vice president of EF Hutton. In January 1986, he was sentenced to three years in prison for embezzling $190,000 of city funds.

On March 17, 1978, Donaldson married Winifred E. Burrell, whom he had one child with, then later divorced. He retired in 2006, dying on April 3, 2016, aged 74, in Washington, D.C., from cancer.
