= Matt Peart =

Jamaican-born American football player (born 1997)

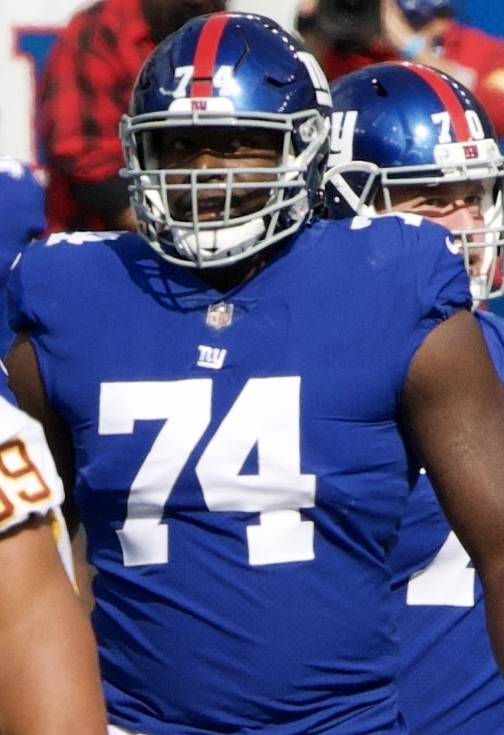
- Peart with the New York Giants in 2020

No. 79 – Denver Broncos
- Position: Offensive tackle
- Roster status: Active

Personal information
- Born: June 11, 1997 (age 29); Kingston, Jamaica
- Listed height: 6 ft 7 in (2.01 m)
- Listed weight: 318 lb (144 kg)

Career information
- High school: Governor's Academy (Byfield, Massachusetts, U.S.)
- College: UConn (2015–2019)
- NFL draft: 2020: 3rd round, 99th overall pick

Career history
- New York Giants (2020–2023); Denver Broncos (2024–present)

Awards and highlights
- First team All-AAC (2019)

Career NFL statistics as of Week 8, 2026
- Games played: 74
- Games started: 10
- Stats at Pro Football Reference

Matthew Peart (/pɛərt/ PAIRT; born June 11, 1997) is a Jamaican-American professional football offensive tackle for the Denver Broncos of the National Football League (NFL). He played college football for the UConn Huskies and has previously played in the NFL for the New York Giants.

== Early life ==
Peart was born in Kingston, Jamaica and his family immigrated to the United States when he was four years old, settling in The Bronx, New York. Peart played basketball and participated in the Oliver Scholars Program, which prepares students from underserved communities for top independent schools. Peart earned a scholarship to attend The Governor's Academy in Byfield, Massachusetts. Despite never having played the sport before, Peart became an offensive and defensive lineman for the school's football team and helped the Governors to four straight Independent School League championships. Rated a two-star recruit, Peart committed to play college football at the University of Connecticut.

== College career ==
Peart redshirted his true freshman season at UConn. He was named the Huskies' starting left tackle during spring practice after redshirting started all 12 of the team's games at that position during his redshirt freshman and sophomore seasons before moving to right tackle before his redshirt junior season. Peart again started all 12 of UConn's games as during his redshirt junior season. In his final season, Peart was named first-team All-American Athletic Conference. Peart started all 48 games during his four seasons of eligibility.

== Professional career ==
Pre-draft measurables
Height	Weight	Arm length	Hand span	Wingspan	40-yard dash	10-yard split	20-yard split	20-yard shuttle	Three-cone drill	Vertical jump	Broad jump	Bench press	Wonderlic
6 ft 6 5/8 in (2.00 m)	318 lb (144 kg)	36 5/8 in (0.93 m)	9 1/2 in (0.24 m)	7 ft 2 1/2 in (2.20 m)	5.06 s	1.75 s	2.94 s	4.92 s	8.01 s	30 in (0.76 m)	9 ft 5 in (2.87 m)	26 reps	20
All values from NFL Combine

=== New York Giants ===
==== 2020 ====
Peart was selected by the New York Giants in the third round with the 99th overall pick in the 2020 NFL draft.

Peart made his NFL debut on September 27, 2020, in a 9–36 loss to the San Francisco 49ers. Peart made his first career start during Week 6, taking the place of Andrew Thomas after Thomas arrived late for a team meeting and was subsequently benched. Peart was placed on the reserve/COVID-19 list by the team on November 20, 2020, and activated on December 1.

==== 2021 ====
Peart got his first start of the season at right tackle against the Dallas Cowboys with Andrew Thomas hurt and Nate Solder moving to left tackle. In Week 16 against the Philadelphia Eagles Peart suffered a torn ACL and was placed on injured reserve on December 27. He finished the season playing in 15 games with five starts at right tackle.

==== 2022 ====
On August 23, 2022, Peart was placed on the reserve/PUP list to start the season. On November 12, 2022, Peart was activated from the reserve list.

==== 2023 ====
On October 25, 2023, Peart was placed on injured reserve with a shoulder injury. On December 24, 2023, Peart was activated from reserve.

=== Denver Broncos ===
On March 20, 2024, Peart signed a one-year contract with the Denver Broncos.

On March 12, 2025, Peart signed a two-year, $7 million extension with the Broncos. During the 2025 season, Peart started his first game for the Broncos in Week 6 against the New York Jets after starting left guard Ben Powers suffered a long-term biceps injury the previous week. Early in the game, Peart sustained a knee injury and was subsequently placed on injured reserve on October 14.
