= Josiah Deguara =

American football player (born 1997)

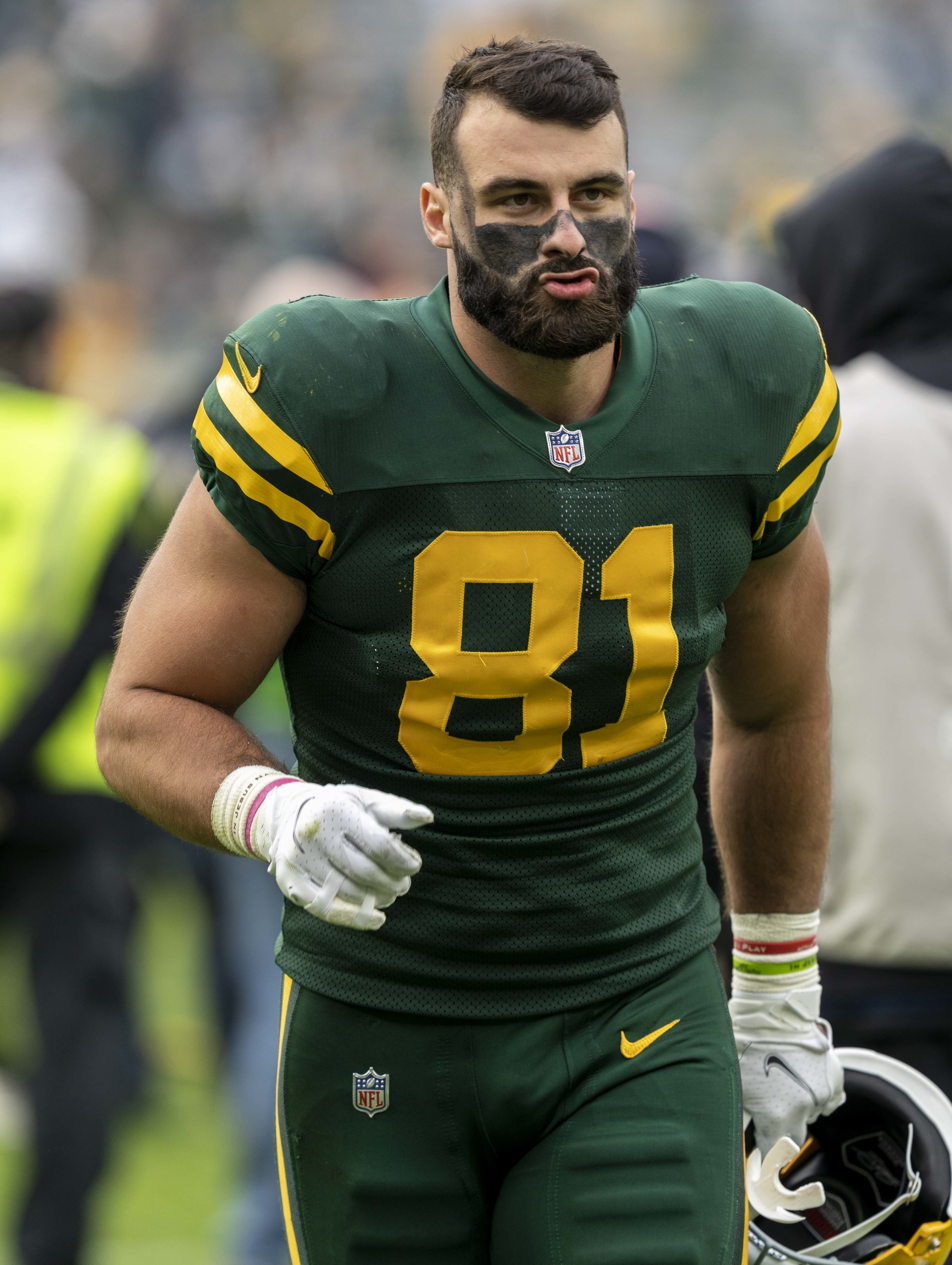
- Deguara with the Green Bay Packers in 2021

Los Angeles Chargers
- Positions: Tight end, fullback
- Roster status: Practice squad

Personal information
- Born: February 14, 1997 (age 29); Santa Rosa, California, U.S.
- Listed height: 6 ft 2 in (1.88 m)
- Listed weight: 240 lb (109 kg)

Career information
- High school: Folsom (Folsom, California)
- College: Cincinnati (2015–2019)
- NFL draft: 2020: 3rd round, 94th overall pick

Career history
- Green Bay Packers (2020–2023); Jacksonville Jaguars (2024); Arizona Cardinals (2025); San Francisco 49ers (2026)*; New York Giants (2026)*; Philadelphia Eagles (2026); Seattle Seahawks (2026)*; Los Angeles Chargers (2026–present)*
- * Offseason or practice squad member only

Awards and highlights
- First-team All-AAC (2019); Second-team All-AAC (2018)

Career NFL statistics as of 2025
- Receptions: 53
- Receiving yards: 471
- Receiving touchdowns: 3
- Stats at Pro Football Reference

Josiah Daniel Deguara (born February 14, 1997) is an American professional football tight end and fullback for the Los Angeles Chargers of the National Football League (NFL). He played college football for the Cincinnati Bearcats and was selected by the Green Bay Packers in the third round of the 2020 NFL draft.

== Early life ==
Deguara attended Folsom High School in Folsom, California. Listed as a three-star recruit by 247Sports and a two-star recruit by 247Sports Composite, Deguara picked Cincinnati over an offer from Air Force.

== College career ==
Deguara gained 1,117 yards on 92 receptions during his collegiate career at the University of Cincinnati. He had 13 touchdowns combined in his junior and senior seasons. Deguara was a First-team All-American Athletic Conference selection.

== Professional career ==
Pre-draft measurables
| Height | Weight | Arm length | Hand span | Wingspan | 40-yard dash | 10-yard split | 20-yard split | 20-yard shuttle | Three-cone drill | Vertical jump | Broad jump | Bench press |
|---|---|---|---|---|---|---|---|---|---|---|---|---|
| 6 ft 2 3/8 in (1.89 m) | 242 lb (110 kg) | 31 5/8 in (0.80 m) | 9 in (0.23 m) | 6 ft 3 1/4 in (1.91 m) | 4.72 s | 1.68 s | 2.77 s | 4.35 s | 7.15 s | 35.5 in (0.90 m) | 9 ft 7 in (2.92 m) | 25 reps |
All values from NFL Combine

=== Green Bay Packers ===
The Green Bay Packers selected Deguara in the third round with the 94th overall pick in the 2020 NFL draft. He signed his rookie contract on July 24, 2020. He saw his first professional action on September 13, 2020, during a Week 1 victory over the Minnesota Vikings, recording one catch for 12 yards. He suffered a torn ACL in Week 5 and was placed on injured reserve on October 13, 2020.

On November 21, 2021, Deguara scored his first NFL touchdown on a 25-yard pass from Aaron Rodgers during a 34–31 loss to the Vikings.

=== Jacksonville Jaguars ===
On March 28, 2024, Deguara signed with the Jacksonville Jaguars. He was released on August 27, and re–signed to the practice squad. Deguara was elevated to the Jaguars' active roster on September 23, for a game against the Buffalo Bills, and signed to the active roster the following week. Deguara played in 15 games with the Jaguars in 2024 and recorded 3 receptions for 14 yards. He played 87 offensive snaps and 243 special teams snaps.

=== Arizona Cardinals ===
On May 5, 2025, Deguara signed with the Arizona Cardinals on a one-year contract. He was waived on August 26 as part of final roster cuts and re-signed to the practice squad the next day. On October 15, Deguara was signed to the active roster. Deguara was released on November 4, and re-signed with the Cardinals the following day.

=== San Francisco 49ers ===
On July 31, 2026, Deguara signed a one-year contract with the San Francisco 49ers. On August 24, Deguara was released by the 49ers.

=== New York Giants ===
On August 26, 2026, Deguara signed with the New York Giants. He was released by the Giants three days later as a part of preliminary roster cuts.

=== Philadelphia Eagles ===
On September 15, 2026, Deguara was signed to the Philadelphia Eagles practice squad. He was released on October 13.

=== Seattle Seahawks ===
On October 19, 2026, Deguara was signed to the Seattle Seahawks practice squad. On October 27, he was released.

=== Los Angeles Chargers ===
On November 19, 2026, Deguara signed with the Los Angeles Chargers practice squad.

== NFL career statistics ==
=== Regular season ===
| Year | Team | GP | GS | REC | YDS | AVG | Lng | TD | FUM | Lost |
|---|---|---|---|---|---|---|---|---|---|---|
| 2020 | GB | 2 | 1 | 1 | 12 | 12.0 | 12 | 0 | 0 | 0 |
| 2021 | GB | 16 | 2 | 25 | 245 | 9.8 | 62 | 2 | 0 | 0 |
| 2022 | GB | 17 | 3 | 13 | 114 | 8.8 | 25 | 0 | 0 | 0 |
| 2023 | GB | 15 | 4 | 8 | 65 | 8.1 | 19 | 0 | 0 | 0 |
| 2024 | JAX | 15 | 0 | 3 | 14 | 4.7 | 8 | 0 | 0 | 0 |
| 2025 | ARI | 12 | 2 | 3 | 21 | 7.0 | 8 | 1 | 0 | 0 |
| Total | | 77 | 12 | 53 | 471 | 8.9 | 62 | 3 | 0 | 0 |
Source: pro-football-reference.com

=== Postseason ===
| Year | Team | GP | GS | REC | YDS | AVG | Lng | TD | FUM | Lost |
|---|---|---|---|---|---|---|---|---|---|---|
| 2021 | GB | 1 | 0 | 0 | 0 | 0.0 | 0 | 0 | 0 | 0 |
| 2023 | GB | 2 | 0 | 0 | 0 | 0.0 | 0 | 0 | 0 | 0 |
| Total | | 3 | 0 | 0 | 0 | 0.0 | 0 | 0 | 0 | 0 |
Source: pro-football-reference.com

== Personal life ==
While at the University of Cincinnati, Deguara interned in the operations department of FC Cincinnati.
