= Reggie Robinson =

American football player (born 1997)

Reggie Robinson II
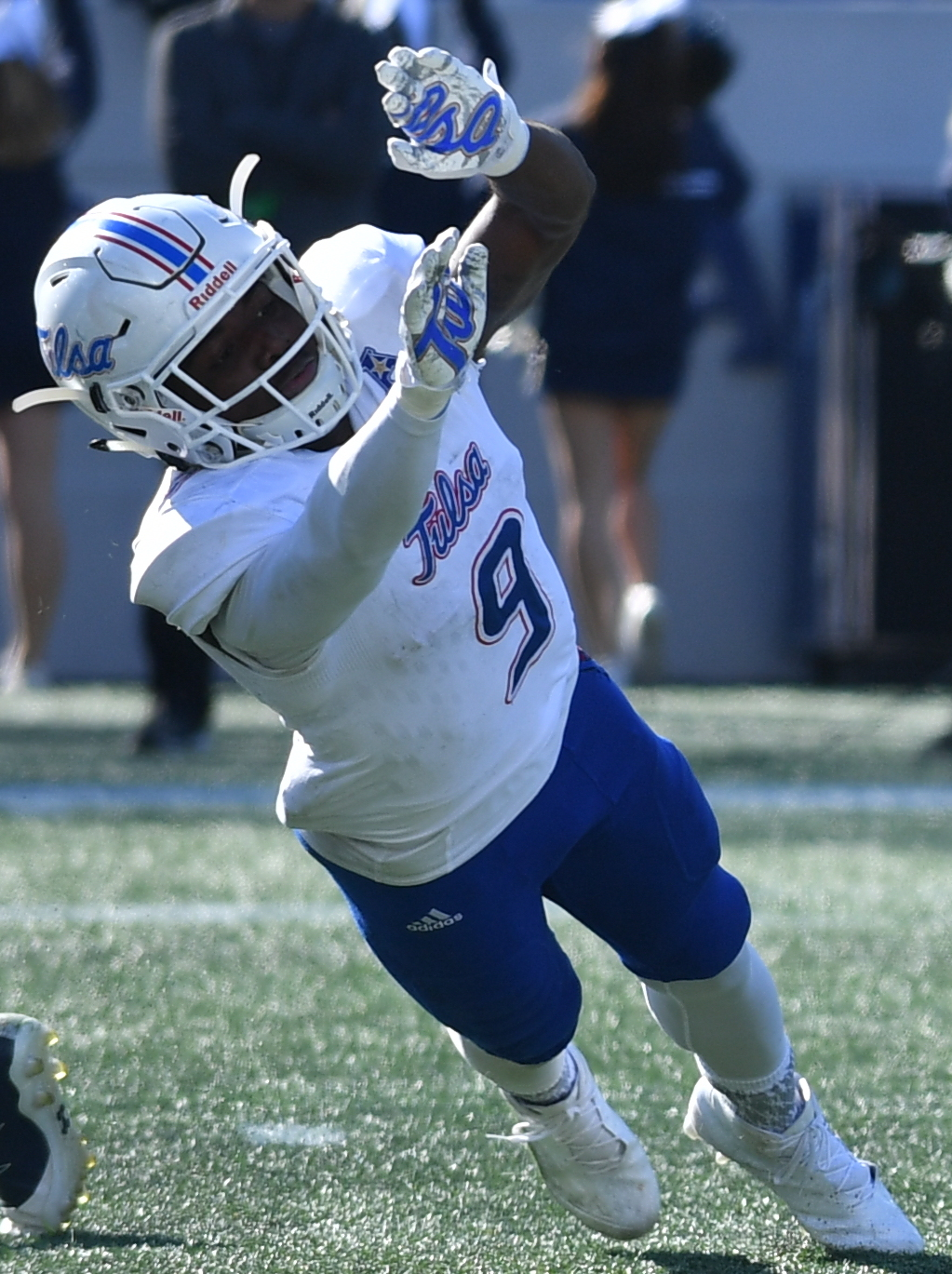
- Robinson with the Tulsa Golden Hurricane in 2016

No. 41
- Position: Cornerback

Personal information
- Born: April 14, 1997 (age 29); Ruston, Louisiana, U.S.
- Listed height: 6 ft 1 in (1.85 m)
- Listed weight: 190 lb (86 kg)

Career information
- High school: Cleburne (Cleburne, Texas)
- College: Tulsa (2015–2019)
- NFL draft: 2020: 4th round, 123rd overall pick

Career history
- Dallas Cowboys (2020–2021); Houston Texans (2022)*; Cleveland Browns (2022)*; Seattle Sea Dragons (2023)*; DC Defenders (2023)
- * Offseason or practice squad member only

Awards and highlights
- First-team All-AAC (2019)

Career NFL statistics
- Total tackles: 1
- Forced fumbles: 1
- Stats at Pro Football Reference

Reginald Robinson II (born April 14, 1997) is an American former professional football player who was a cornerback in the National Football League (NFL). He played college football for the Tulsa Golden Hurricane.

== Early life ==
Robinson attended Cleburne High School, where he started three seasons on defense at safety and two years at wide receiver on offense. As a senior, he posted 45 tackles, 2 interceptions, 3 passes defensed, 17 receptions for 269 yards, 4 touchdowns and also returned 11 kickoffs for 309 yards (28.1-yard avg.). He earned All-district and All-Johnson County honors during his junior and senior seasons. He also practiced track, running a record 10.68 seconds in the 100 metres.

A 3-star recruit, he committed to the University of Tulsa on January 31, 2015, choosing the Golden Hurricane over offers from Minnesota, Kansas State, Houston and North Texas.

== College career ==
As a redshirt freshman, he appeared in all 13 games with 7 starts. He tallied 37 tackles (30 solo), 7 passes defensed, one forced fumble, one fumble recovery and one blocked field goal.

As a sophomore, he started 11 out of 12 games, registering 38 tackles (32 solo), 2.5 tackles for loss and led the team with 9 passes defensed. He had a career-high 8 tackles against the University of Toledo. He made 5 tackles, one pass defensed and one blocked extra point against the United States Naval Academy.

As a junior, he appeared in 8 games with 4 starts, while missing 4 contests with an injury. He collected 19 tackles and 5 passes defensed. He made 3 tackles and blocked an extra point attempt, which he returned 97 yards for a defensive 2-point conversion, against the United States Naval Academy.

As a senior, he recorded 38 tackles, (one for loss), 4 interceptions (led the team), 13 passes defensed, 2 fumble recoveries and was named first-team All-AAC. He was also a core special teams player, blocking a kick each season he saw the field in Tulsa. After his senior season, he participated in the 2020 Senior Bowl and the 2020 NFL Combine.

== Professional career ==
Pre-draft measurables
Height	Weight	Arm length	Hand span	Wingspan	40-yard dash	10-yard split	20-yard split	20-yard shuttle	Three-cone drill	Vertical jump	Broad jump	Bench press
6 ft 0 7/8 in (1.85 m)	205 lb (93 kg)	31 1/2 in (0.80 m)	8 3/8 in (0.21 m)	6 ft 3 5/8 in (1.92 m)	4.44 s	1.52 s	2.59 s	4.18 s	7.09 s	36.0 in (0.91 m)	11 ft 0 in (3.35 m)	22 reps
All values from NFL Combine

=== Dallas Cowboys ===
Robinson was selected by the Dallas Cowboys in the fourth round (123rd overall) of the 2020 NFL draft. As a rookie, he was moved to safety during training camp, but struggled adapting to the professional game. He was declared inactive for the first 11 games and played in the last five contests only on special teams.

On August 17, 2021, Robinson was placed on season-ending injured reserve with a toe injury.

On March 11, 2022, Robinson was waived by the Cowboys.

=== Houston Texans ===
On March 14, 2022, Robinson was claimed off waivers by the Houston Texans. On May 16, 2022, Robinson was waived by the Texans.

=== Cleveland Browns ===
On May 17, 2022, Robinson was claimed off waivers by the Cleveland Browns. He was waived with an injury designation on August 5, 2022, and subsequently reverted to injured reserve. He was waived off injured reserve on August 11, 2022.

=== Seattle Sea Dragons ===
Robinson was selected by the Seattle Sea Dragons of the XFL in the Group 2 fifth round (20th overall) of the 2023 XFL draft.

=== DC Defenders ===
Robinson was claimed off waivers on February 7, 2023, by the DC Defenders. He was released on February 10, 2023, but was re-signed on April 18, 2023. He was not part of the roster after the 2024 UFL dispersal draft on January 15, 2024.

== Career statistics ==
=== NFL ===
Year	Team	Games		Tackles					Interceptions						Fumbles		
Year	Team	GP	GS	Total	Solo	Ast	Sck	Sfty	PD	Int	Yds	Avg	Lng	TD	FF	FR	TD
2020	DAL	5	0	1	1	0	0.0	0	0	0	0	0.0	0	0	1	0	0
Career		5	0	1	1	0	0.0	0	0	0	0	0.0	0	0	1	0	0

=== College ===
Year	Team	Games		Tackles				Interceptions				Fumbles		
Year	Team	GP	GS	Total	Solo	Ast	Sack	PD	Int	Yds	TD	FF	FR	TD
2015	Tulsa	0	0	Did not play										
2016	Tulsa	13	7	37	30	7	0.0	7	0	0	0	1	1	0
2017	Tulsa	12	11	38	32	6	0.0	9	0	0	0	0	0	0
2018	Tulsa	8	4	19	13	6	0.0	5	0	0	0	0	0	0
2019	Tulsa	12	10	38	26	12	0.0	13	4	37	0	0	2	0
Career		45	32	132	101	31	0.0	34	4	37	0	1	3	0

== Personal life ==
Robinson is deaf in his left ear. His father played college football for the Grambling State Tigers.
