= Pine Street Neighborhood Historic District =

Historic district in Maryland, United States

- U.S. National Register of Historic Places
- U.S. Historic district
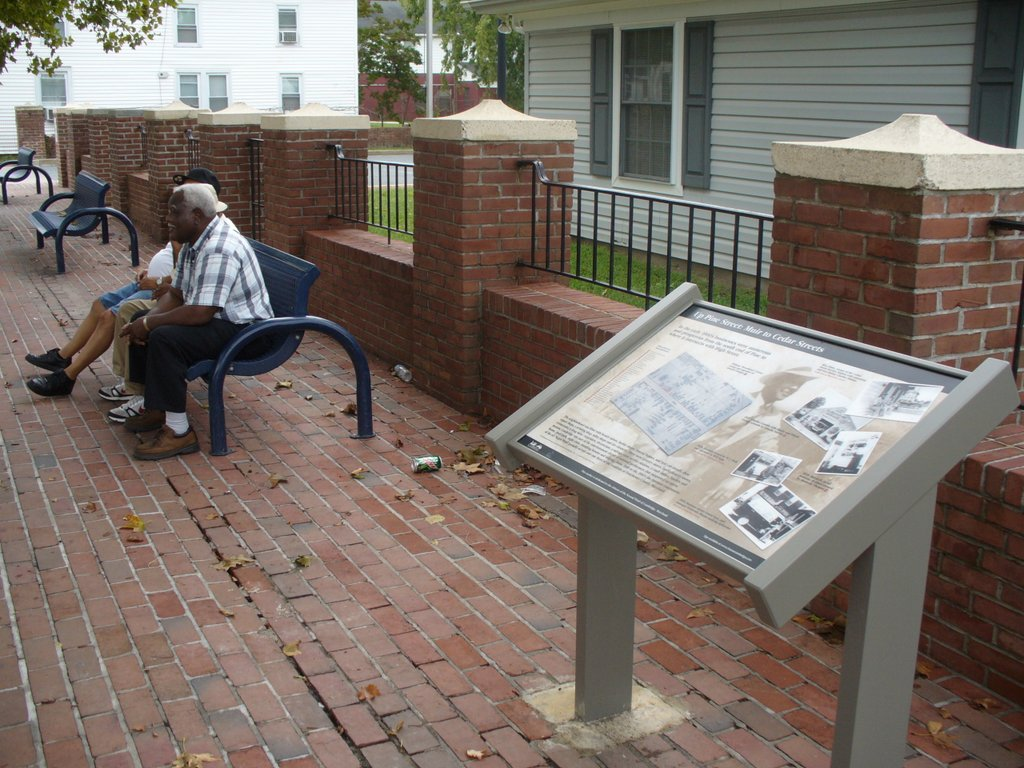

- Location within Maryland Location within the United States
- Location: High, Pine and Washington Sts., Cambridge, Maryland
- Coordinates: 38°33′58″N 76°4′56″W
- NRHP reference No.: 12000976
- Added to NRHP: November 28, 2012

The Pine Street Neighborhood Historic District encompasses a neighborhood of Cambridge, Maryland with more than 150 years of history as an African-American neighborhood. The district covers about 100 acres (40 ha) of Cambridge, centered on the triangular intersection of High, Washington, and Pine Streets. It is a predominantly residential area with some commercial development. The majority of the district's housing consists of somewhat uniform factory worker housing. There are rows of two-story, two-bay, gable-front frame houses, sometimes with four-bay duplexes.

The district was listed on the National Register of Historic Places in 2012.

== See also ==
- National Register of Historic Places listings in Dorchester County, Maryland
