= Freedom Highways campaign =

1962 desegregation campaign

Freedom Highways campaign, or Freedom Highways project, was a 1962 project by Congress of Racial Equality (CORE) to seek racial desegregation of hotels and restaurants located in U.S. states along the southeastern seaboard. After the Freedom Rides campaign during 1961 to integrate interstate and intrastate travel and terminals in the southern United States, the organization sought to apply the same tactic of nonviolence and direct action towards hotels and restaurants from Maryland down to Florida.
