= Maryland Route 335 =

State highway in Maryland, United States

Maryland Route 335
- Maryland Route 335 highlighted in red

Route information
- Maintained by MDSHA
- Length: 16.36 mi (26.33 km)
- Existed: 1927–present
- Tourist routes: Harriet Tubman Underground Railroad Byway; Chesapeake Country Scenic Byway

Major junctions
- South end: Hoopers Island Road on Hooper's Island
- MD 336 at Crossroads
- North end: MD 16 in Church Creek

Location
- Country: United States
- State: Maryland
- Counties: Dorchester

Highway system
- Maryland highway system; Interstate; US; State; Scenic Byways
| ← MD 334 | → MD 336 |

Maryland Route 335 (MD 335) is a state highway in the U.S. state of Maryland. The state highway runs 16.36 miles (26.33 km) from the upper end of Hooper's Island north to MD 16 in Church Creek. MD 335 provides access to several communities along the Honga River in southern Dorchester County. The state highway also passes through Blackwater National Wildlife Refuge. MD 335 was designated as one of the original state roads, but only the portion of the highway from Crossroads to the Blackwater River was completed by the early 1920s. The highway was constructed from Crossroads to Golden Hill in the mid-1920s, from Crossroads to Church Creek in the late 1920s, and from Golden Hill to Hooper's Island with the completion of a modern bridge over Fishing Creek in 1934.

== Route description ==
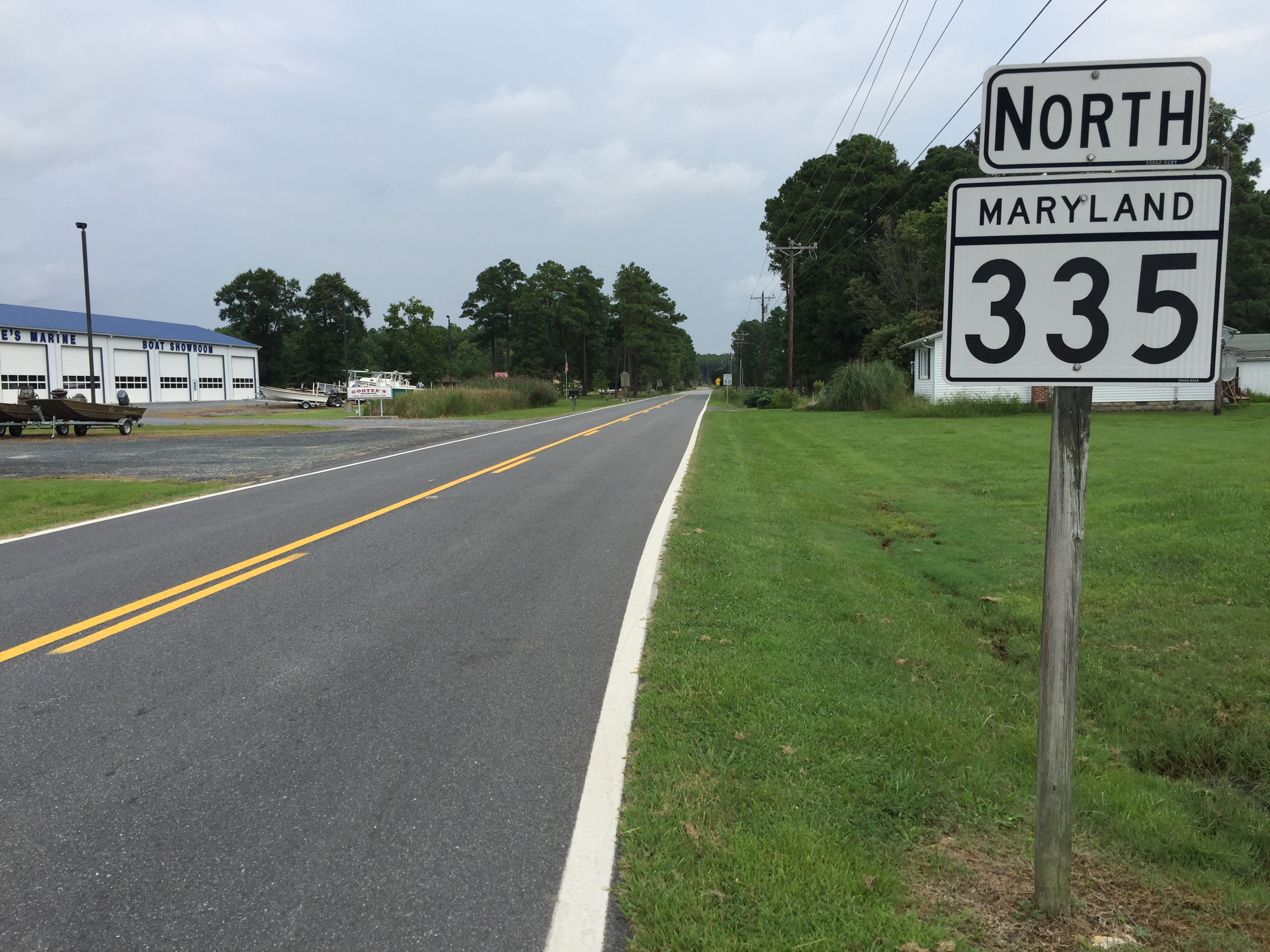
View north along MD 335 at MD 336 in Crossroads

MD 335 begins in the village of Honga on Upper Hooper's Island just south of Applegarth Road. Hoopers Island Road continues south through Upper Hooper's Island and Middle Hooper's Island to the villages of Fishing Creek and Hoopersville. MD 335 heads north as two-lane undivided Hoopers Island Road on a high-level bridge across Fishing Creek, a strait between Tar Bay and the Honga River. After heading north up Meekins Neck, the state highway curves to the east and enters the Great Marsh. Within the marsh, MD 335 intersects Smithville Road at the settlement of Golden Hill between crossings of Great Marsh Creek and Spicer Creek, which flow into the Honga River estuary. The state highway continues southeast where it crosses Wallace Creek before intersecting the western terminus of MD 336 (Lakesville Road) in the hamlet of Crossroads. MD 335 turns north onto Golden Hill Road and enters a series of swamps that make up Blackwater National Wildlife Refuge. After the state highway traverses the Blackwater River, the road heads east of the Harriet Tubman Underground Railroad Visitor Center which is located within Harriet Tubman Underground Railroad State Park. The road passes by Harriet Tubman Underground Railroad National Historical Park and the Chesapeake Forest Lands, running through farmland. MD 335 crosses Birch Dam Creek before entering the town of Church Creek. There, the highway reaches its northern terminus at MD 16, which is named Church Creek Road northeast toward Cambridge and Taylors Island Road headed west. A park and ride lot is located south of this intersection.

== History ==
The road from Cambridge to Hooper's Island, which includes part of modern MD 16 and all of MD 335, was marked for improvement as one of the original state roads by the Maryland State Roads Commission in 1910. However, the first section of MD 335, from just north of the Blackwater River to 1 mile (1.6 km) south of Church Creek, was not improved until it was paved as a state-aid road by 1921. By 1923, pavement had been added from the southern end of the state-aid section south to Crossroads. The section from Crossroads to Golden Hill was completed in 1925. The section north of Blackwater River was reconstructed and extended to Church Creek by 1930. MD 335 south of Golden Hill was completed in 1933. The last piece of the state highway was a new bridge over Fishing Creek completed in 1934. The Fishing Creek Bridge was replaced in 1991 and 1992 contemporaneously with new bridges over the Blackwater River, Great Marsh Creek, and Spicer Creek.

== Junction list ==
The entire route is in Dorchester County.

| Location | mi | km | Destinations | Notes |
|---|---|---|---|---|
| Hooper's Island | 0.00 | 0.00 | Hoopers Island Road south – Fishing Creek, Hoopersville | Southern terminus |
| Crossroads | 6.56 | 10.56 | MD 336 east (Lakesville Road) – Wingate, Bishops Head | Western terminus of MD 336; MD 335 turns north onto Golden Hill Road |
| Church Creek | 16.36 | 26.33 | MD 16 (Church Creek Road/Taylors Island Road) – Cambridge, Taylors Island | Northern terminus |
1.000 mi = 1.609 km; 1.000 km = 0.621 mi
