= Maryland Route 336 =

State highway in Maryland, United States

Maryland Route 336
- Lakesville Road
- Maryland Route 336 highlighted in red

Route information
- Maintained by MDSHA
- Length: 4.87 mi (7.84 km)
- Existed: 1927–present
- Tourist routes: Chesapeake Country Scenic Byway

Major junctions
- West end: MD 335 at Crossroads
- East end: Andrews Road near Crapo

Location
- Country: United States
- State: Maryland
- Counties: Dorchester

Highway system
- Maryland highway system; Interstate; US; State; Scenic Byways
← MD 335	→ MD 337

Maryland Route 336 (MD 336) is a state highway in the U.S. state of Maryland. Known as Lakesville Road, the state highway runs 4.87 miles (7.84 km) from MD 335 in Crossroads east to Andrews Road near Crapo in southern Dorchester County. MD 336 provides access to several small communities on the Bishops Head peninsula. The state highway was paved along its present length in the mid-1920s. MD 336 was extended through Crapo in the mid-1930s and to Toddville in 1950. The eastern terminus was rolled back to its present location in 1959.

== Route description ==
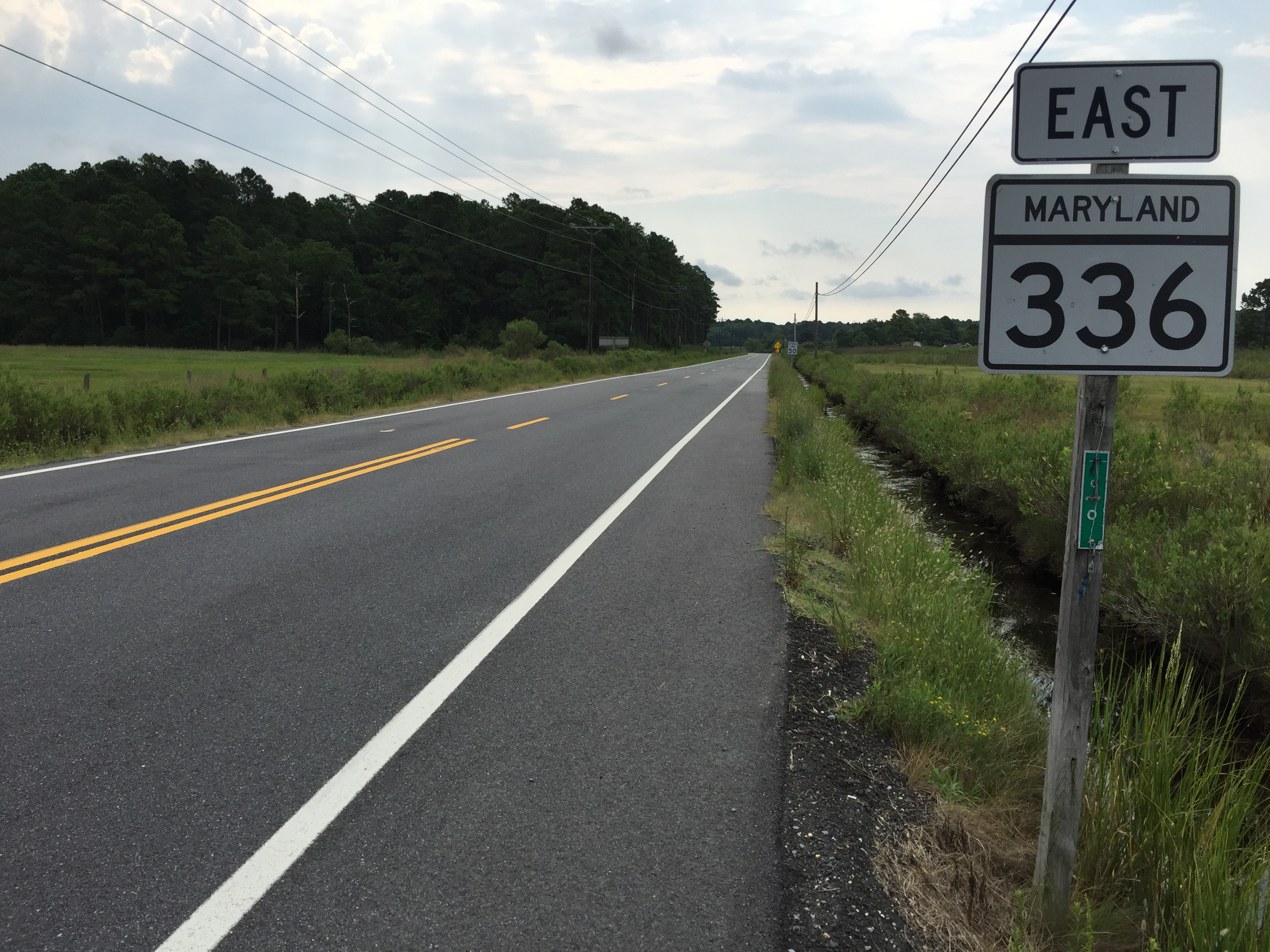
View east along MD 336 at MD 335 in Crossroads

MD 336 begins at an intersection with MD 335 in the hamlet of Crossroads. MD 335 heads north as Golden Hill Road toward the town of Church Creek and west (south) as Hoopers Island Road toward Hooper's Island. MD 336 heads east as a two-lane undivided road through a mix of farmland and forest. The state highway passes through an S-curve as it crosses World's End Creek before heading east again through swampland. At Edgar Road, MD 336 curves to the south and reaches its eastern terminus at the intersection with Andrews Road in the hamlet of Lakesville north of Crapo. The roadway continues south as Lakesville–Crapo Road toward the small communities of Crapo, Toddville, Wingate, and Crocheron on the Bishops Head peninsula.

== History ==
MD 336 was paved from Crossroads to the crossing of World's End Creek in 1925 and to Lakesville in 1926. The state highway was extended south along Lakesville–Crapo Road through Crapo in 1933 and to the intersection with Toddville Road in 1935. MD 336 was extended east along Toddville Road to Toddville in 1950. The eastern terminus of MD 336 was moved from Toddville to its present location in Lakesville in 1959.

== Junction list ==
The entire route is in Dorchester County.

Location	mi	km	Destinations	Notes
Crossroads	0.00	0.00	MD 335 (Golden Hill Road/Hoopers Island Road) – Hoopers Island, Cambridge	Western terminus
	4.87	7.84	Andrews Road east / Lakesville Crapo Road south – Wingate, Bishops Head	Eastern terminus
1.000 mi = 1.609 km; 1.000 km = 0.621 mi
