= Harriet Tubman Underground Railroad State Park =

State park in Maryland, United States

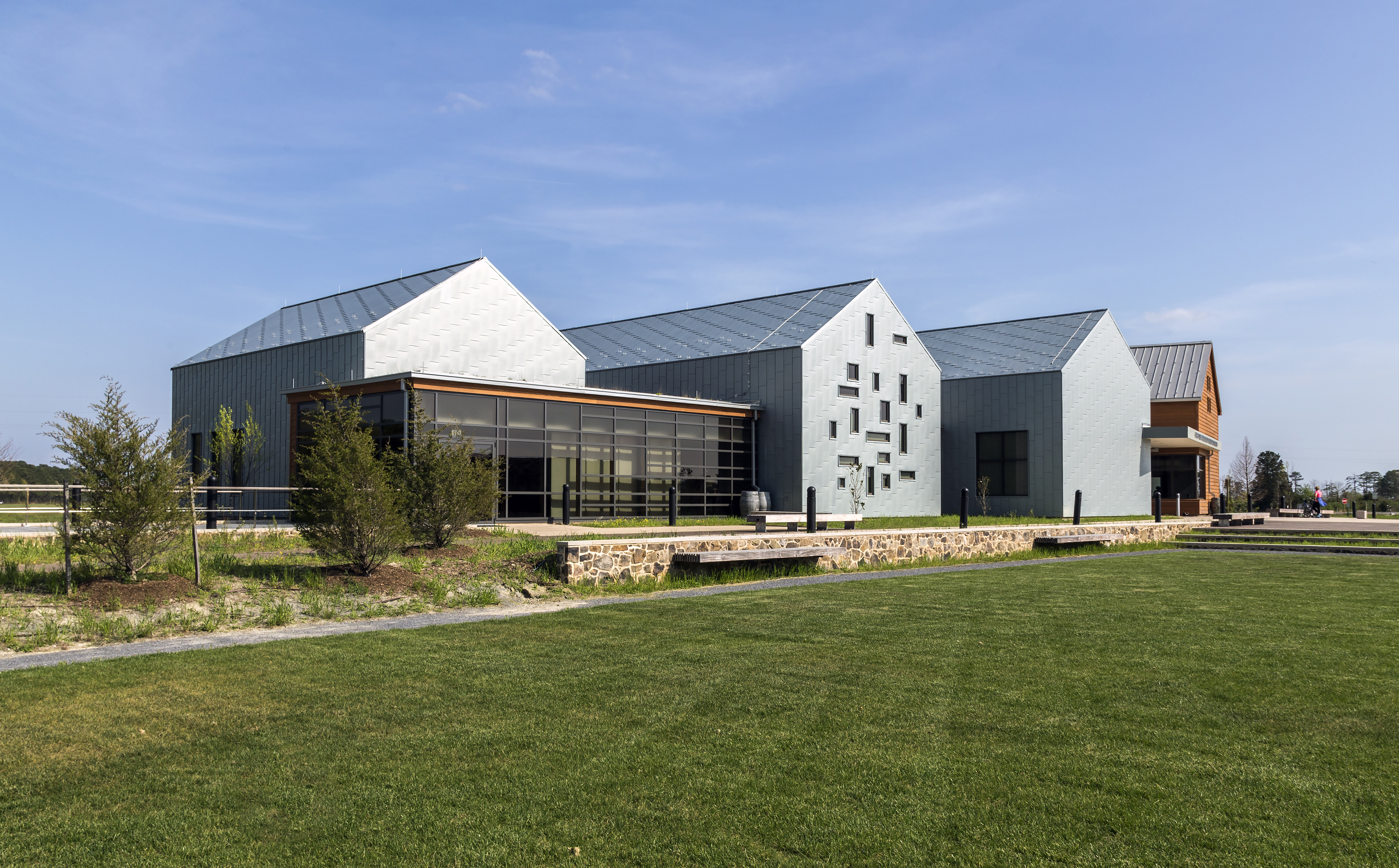

- Location within Maryland
- Location: Dorchester County, Maryland, United States
- Nearest city: Cambridge, Maryland
- Coordinates: 38°26′54″N 76°08′19″W
- Area: 17 acres (6.9 ha)
- Established: 2007; opened 2017
- Administrator: Maryland Department of Natural Resources
- Designation: Maryland state park
- Website: Official website

Harriet Tubman Underground Railroad State Park is a Maryland state park dedicated to the life and work of abolitionist and Underground Railroad activist Harriet Tubman. The park is on Route 335 near Church Creek in Dorchester County, adjacent to Blackwater National Wildlife Refuge.

== History ==
The park was created in 2007 through a land swap with the U.S. Fish and Wildlife Service and developed in conjunction with the Harriet Tubman Underground Railroad National Historical Park. The park is the trailhead for the 125-mile (201 km) Harriet Tubman Underground Railroad Byway and All American Road. The Harriet Tubman Underground Railroad Visitor Center opened in the park on March 11, 2017.
