= Honga River =

Coordinates: 38.3°N 76.17°W

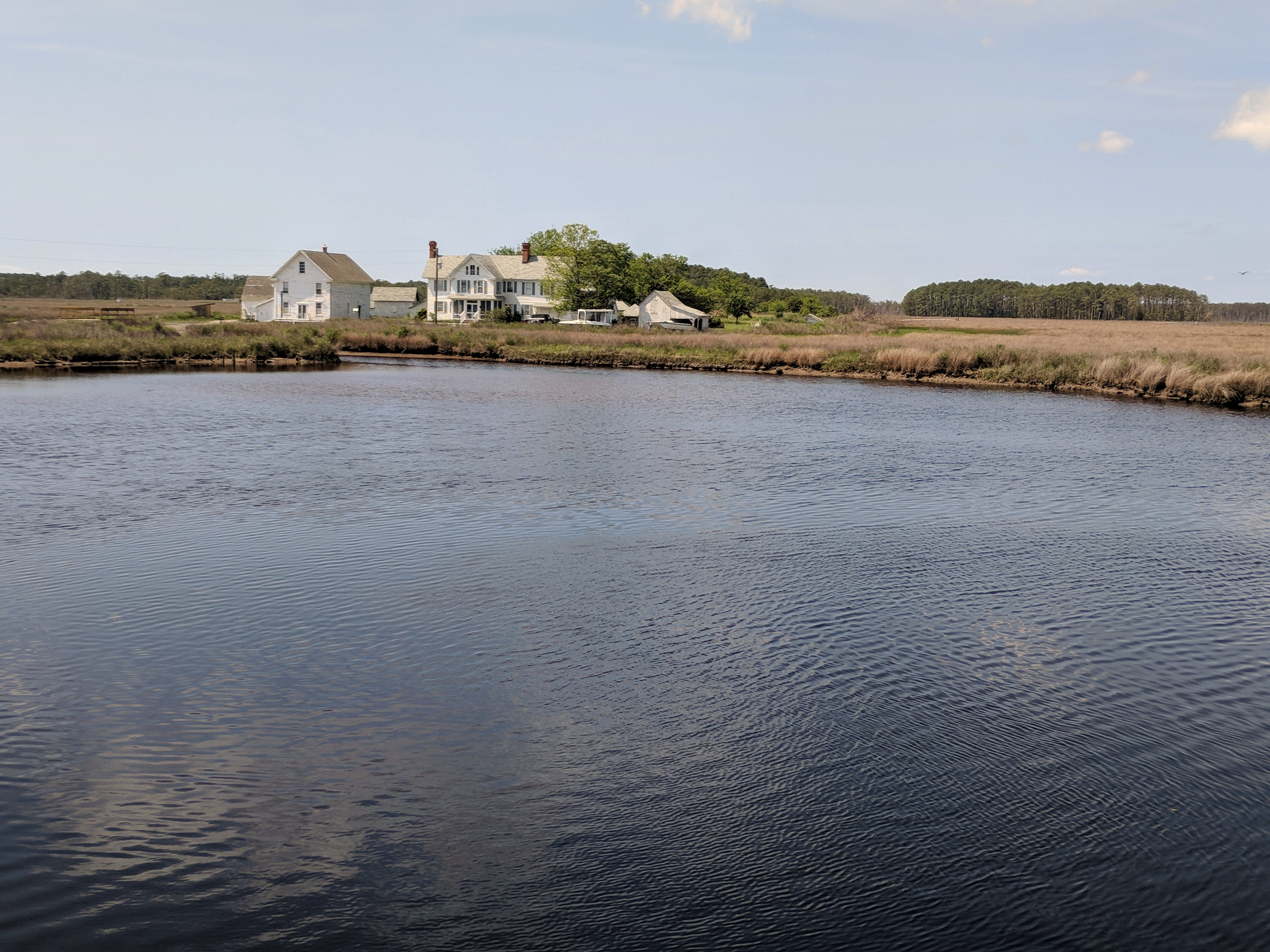

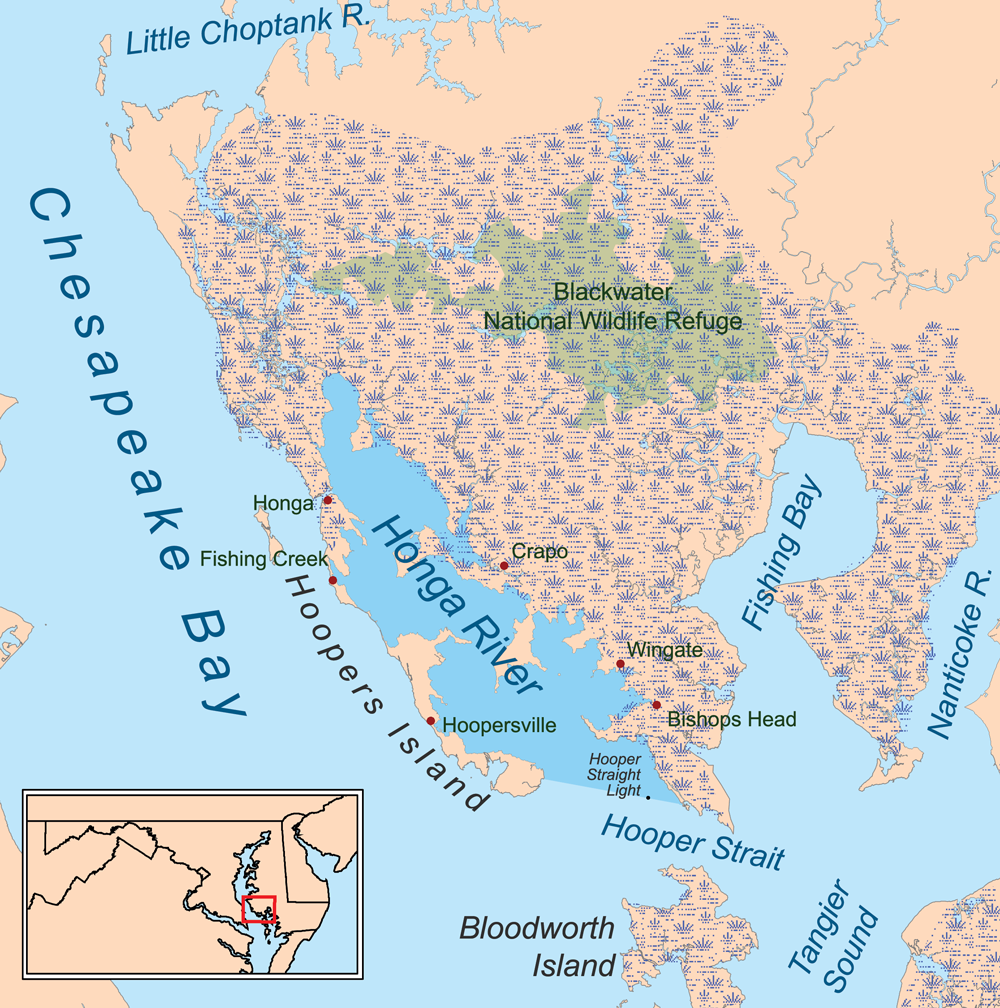
- Honga River Watershed
- Native name: Kahunge (Powhatan)

Location
- Country: United States
- State: Maryland
- Region: Eastern Shore
- Cities: Hoopersville, Bishops Head, Wingate, Crapo, Church Creek

Physical characteristics
- Source
  - location: Church Creek, Maryland
- Mouth: Chesapeake Bay
  - location: Hooper's Island
  - elevation: 0 ft (0 m)

Basin features
- Tributaries
  - left: Wallace Creek, Spicer Creek
  - right: Worlds End Creek, Fox Creek

The Honga River is an estuary on the eastern side of the Chesapeake Bay, bounded on the west by Hooper's Island and on the east by the mainland of Dorchester County, Maryland. 14 miles (23 km) in length and over 1 mile (1.6 km) wide, it runs southeast to the west entrance of Hooper Strait, north of Tangier Island; the Hooper Strait Light stood between the two. Towns on the river include Crapo, Fishing Creek and Wingate.

The Honga River is actually the widened, southern end of a strait that also includes Slaughter Creek, Upper Keene Broad, Dunnock Island Creek, and Lower Keene Broad.

The river was sometimes called "tunger" or even "Hungary" River, Historians hold, however, that the name is derived from the Powatan word kahunge meaning "goose". The Honga was a historic center of the oyster fishery in the bay and continues to be popular with sport fishermen.
