= Fishing Creek, Maryland =

Unincorporated community in Maryland, United States

- Census-designated place
- Location within the State of Maryland
- Coordinates: 38°19′20″N 76°13′28″W
- Country: United States
- State: Maryland
- County: Dorchester

Area
  - Total: 1.37 sq mi (3.56 km^{2})
  - Land: 1.05 sq mi (2.73 km^{2})
  - Water: 0.32 sq mi (0.83 km^{2})
- Elevation: 0 ft (0 m)

Population (2020)
  - Total: 173
  - Density: 163.8/sq mi (63.26/km^{2})
- Time zone: UTC-5 (Eastern (EST))
  - Summer (DST): UTC-4 (EDT)
- ZIP code: 21634
- Area codes: 410, 443, and 667
- GNIS feature ID: 596534

Fishing Creek is an unincorporated community and census-designated place (CDP) in Dorchester County, Maryland, United States, on Upper Hoopers Island. As of the 2010 census, the population of Fishing Creek was 163.

It is in area code 410 and ZIP code 21634.

== Demographics ==
Historical population
Census	Pop.	Note	%±
2010	163		—
2020	173		6.1%
U.S. Decennial Census

== Description ==
Located on a narrow island served primarily by Hoopers Island Road, Fishing Creek has a restaurant (Old Salty's), a post office, and a general store (Hoopers Island General Store), as well as crabbing businesses which rely on seasonal workers. Local legend posits a number of ghosts in the Fishing Creek area. The village is on the upper island of the three-island chain known as Hoopers Island, about 15 miles (24 km) south of the Blackwater National Wildlife Refuge and 24 miles (39 km) south of Cambridge. Hoopersville, on Middle Hooper Island, is 6 miles (10 km) to the south.

== In the media ==
Fishing Creek resident Louie "Rufus" Frase, 43 at the time, was a contestant on the summer 2007 CBS reality television series Pirate Master.
