= Toddville, Maryland =

Unincorporated community in Maryland, United States

- Unincorporated community
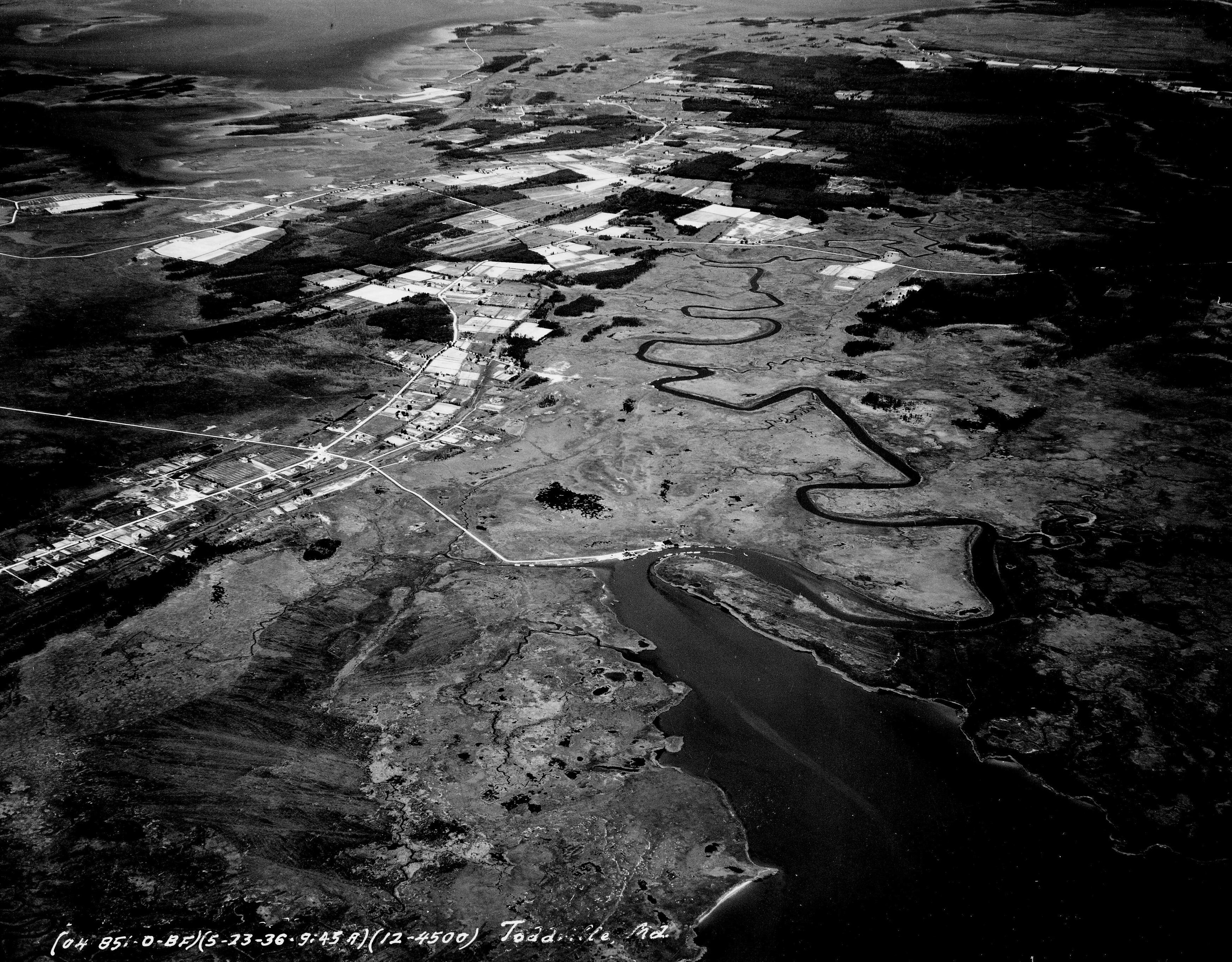
- Toddville in the 1940s

- Location within Maryland
- Coordinates: 38°17′59″N 76°04′14″W
- Country: United States
- State: Maryland
- County: Dorchester
- Elevation: 3 ft (0.91 m)
- Time zone: UTC-5 (Eastern (EST))
  - Summer (DST): UTC-4 (EDT)
- ZIP code: 21672
- Area codes: 410 & 443
- GNIS feature ID: 591416

Toddville is an unincorporated community in Dorchester County, Maryland, United States. Toddville is 1.5 miles (2.4 km) northeast of Wingate. Toddville has a post office with ZIP code 21672.
