= Crocheron, Maryland =

Unincorporated community in Maryland, United States

- Unincorporated community
- Location within Maryland
- Coordinates: 38°14′34″N 76°03′08″W
- Country: United States
- State: Maryland
- County: Dorchester
- Elevation: 0 ft (0 m)
- Time zone: UTC-5 (Eastern (EST))
  - Summer (DST): UTC-4 (EDT)
- ZIP code: 21627
- Area codes: 410, 443, and 667
- GNIS feature ID: 590045

Crocheron is a remote unincorporated community in Dorchester County, Maryland, United States, south of Bishops Head.
