= Hoopers Island =

Coordinates: 38°18′00″N 76°12′29″W

Hoopers Island, Maryland
- 1877 map of western Dorchester County showing Hoopers Island
- Country: United States
- State: Maryland
- County: Dorchester

Population (2000)
  - Total: 441
- Time zone: UTC-5 (Eastern (EST))
  - Summer (DST): UTC-4 (EDT)
- ZIP code: 21634
- Area code: 410
- GNIS feature ID: 588389

Hoopers Island is a chain of islands in Dorchester County, Maryland, United States. Upper Hoopers Island and Lower Hoopers Island are surrounded by water, with the Chesapeake Bay on the west and the Honga River on the east. The remote islands have abundant wildlife and are known for sport fishing and crabbing. Hoopers Island was the subject of one of the earliest land grants in Dorchester County, Maryland.

== Geography ==
Hoopers Island is located on the Eastern Shore of Maryland. The islands are situated on the east shore of the Chesapeake Bay in Dorchester County.

Hoopers Island is roughly 20 miles (32 km) long and consists of three small islands. The islands are very narrow in many places, and water, the Chesapeake Bay and the Honga River, is visible on both sides of Maryland Route 335, which travels through the islands.

Upper Hoopers Island is located at N. 38°20' W. 76°14 and Middle Hoopers Island is located at N. 38°16' W. 76°11. Lower Hoopers Island is now a marshland.

== History ==
The early residents of what is now known as Hoopers Island were the Yaocomico people. According to local folklore, the land was purchased from the Yaocomico tribe for five woolen blankets.

Hoopers Island is considered the oldest settled area in Dorchester County. The islands are named after Henry Hooper. Hooper was a friend of the Calverts, a family regarded as the founders of the state of Maryland. In the mid-17th century, parts of the islands were surveyed for Hooper. The first parcel of land was surveyed by Robert Clift and named Hooper's Clifts. An additional 400 acres (1.6 km^{2}) of land was surveyed for Hooper in 1668. He received additional parcels of land in 1669 as well.

Though much of the land was claimed by the Hooper family, others such as William Chaplin, Richard Bentley and Philip Shapeley owned large plots of land. In addition, some indentured servants such as Thomas Hooten and Daniel Puddiford received land.

=== The Hooper family ===
The Hooper family made Dorchester County their family home in 1669. Henry Hooper had a large family: he was married twice and had 14 children. Henry Hooper was one of the first commissioners of Dorchester County. Many of his descendants also served on the Dorchester County legislature. Upon his death, Hooper left parcels of land, with names such as Hooper's Chance, Hooper's Lot, Hooper's Fortune and Hooper's Forrest, to his children.

=== Isolation ===
Due to the geographical nature of Hoopers Island, the residents had to be self-sufficient and independent. Accordingly, the islanders maintained strong family and community ties. Once families moved to Hoopers Island, they stayed for generations. According to one source, for 300 years the population can be traced to just ten families. The outside world was slow to influence the way of life on the island.

== Environment ==
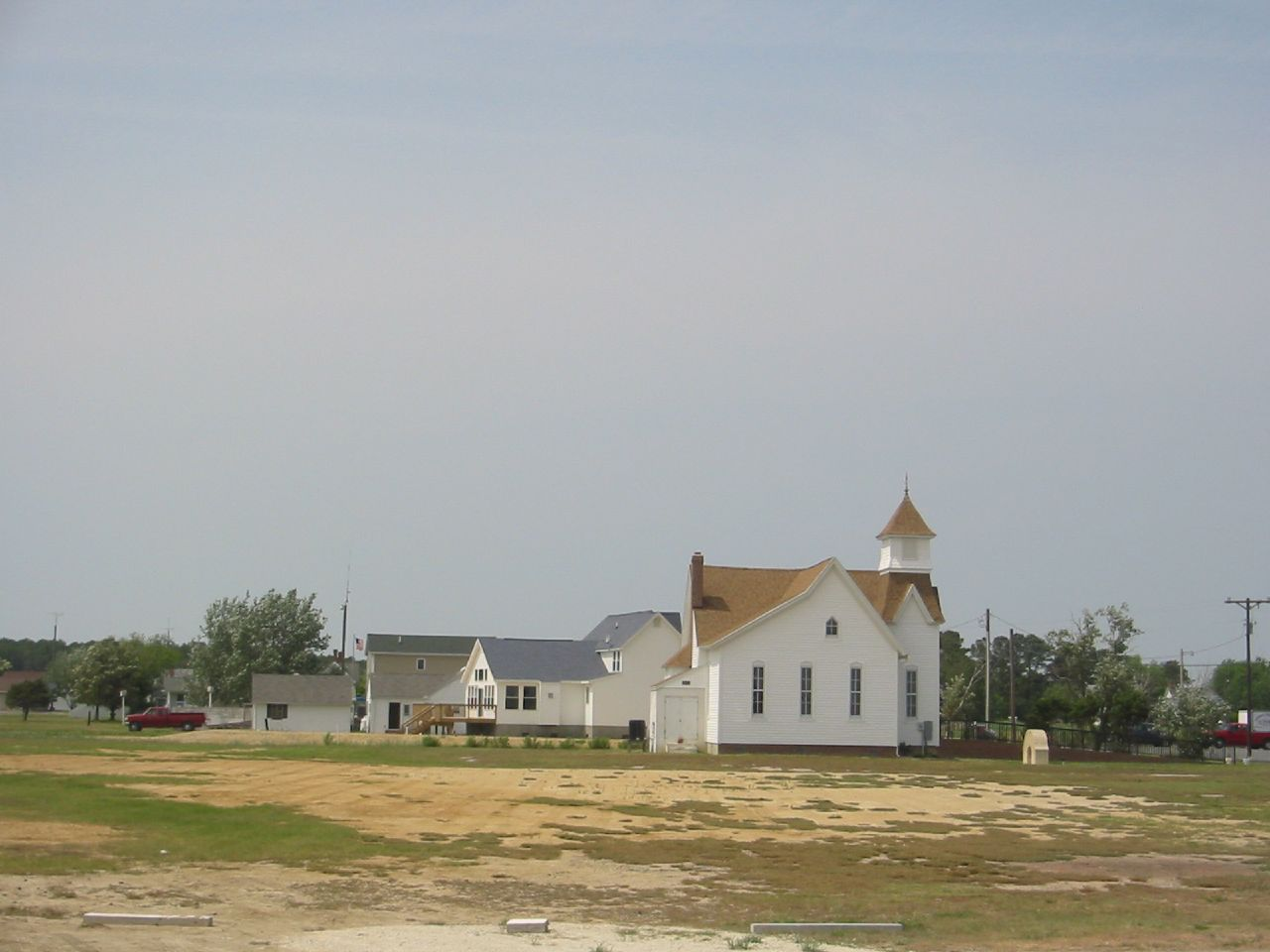
church in Hoopersville

Erosion is a serious threat to the island, as it removes an average of 24.19 acres (97,900 m^{2}) per year. In addition, storms, floods and rising waters have affected and continue to affect the environment and geography of the islands.

Lower Hoopers Island has been uninhabited since the early 20th century. Prior to this, the island was home to the community of Applegarth, which grew considerably during the oyster boom of the 1880s. Due to erosion, the last resident was forced to leave in the late 1920s. For a short while, farmers continued to use the island to pasture their livestock. In 1933, a hurricane destroyed the bridge to Lower Hoopers Island.

Another section of Hoopers Island has also been affected. Swan Island, originally owned by the indentured servant Thomas Hooten, has almost disappeared, but some of its buildings still stand.

Wild geese and ducks are found throughout the marshlands of the islands. Little and great blue herons, American oystercatchers, double-crested cormorants, willets, herring gulls, Forster's common, royal, and least terns, black ducks, gadwalls, egrets, osprey, and the boat-tailed grackle can all be found in and around Hoopers Island.

== Life on Hoopers Island ==
According to a 2018 estimate, the population of Hoopers Island was 559.

Most of the islands’ residents live in the communities of Honga, Fishing Creek and Hoopersville. Honga and Fishing Creek are on Upper Hoopers Island, while the southernmost village, Hoopersville, is on Middle Hoopers Island. Oyster boats, tonging craft and crab houses are visible across the landscape.

=== Events ===
The islanders host several social events, some of which involve fishing. The William T. Ruark Fishing Tournament, held since 1973, is considered the island's largest event. Other events, such as the Arts and Crafts Auction and Bazaar and the Ronald McGlaughlin Artisans Fair, are community affairs that draw both residents and visitors.

=== Community ===
One account described the people and community of Hoopers Island as "strongly independent", "stout-hearted" and "self-sufficient", with a strong "sense of community" and "fellowship." In 1954, there was a crabbers' strike. Because of the large number of crabs in the Bay, prices had fallen so far that the fishermen were not making any money from their catches. Unlike most strikes, which are organized by a union that conducts negotiations to improve conditions, this strike was organized by a close-knit group of fishermen rather than a union. Because the strike was not organized by a union, a Baltimore Sun editorial portrayed the crabbers as lazy, uncivilized and uncooperative. In response, the Organization of the Volunteer Fire Company sent a reply. The reply addressed the negative press the fishermen and their communities had received, stating that they kept up with modern ideas, were civilized, and did not need unions to work together and improve their lives.

=== Industry ===
Originally, the main industry on the island was agriculture. Hoopers Island was mainly known for tobacco, but during the American Revolution, vegetables and grains were also grown.

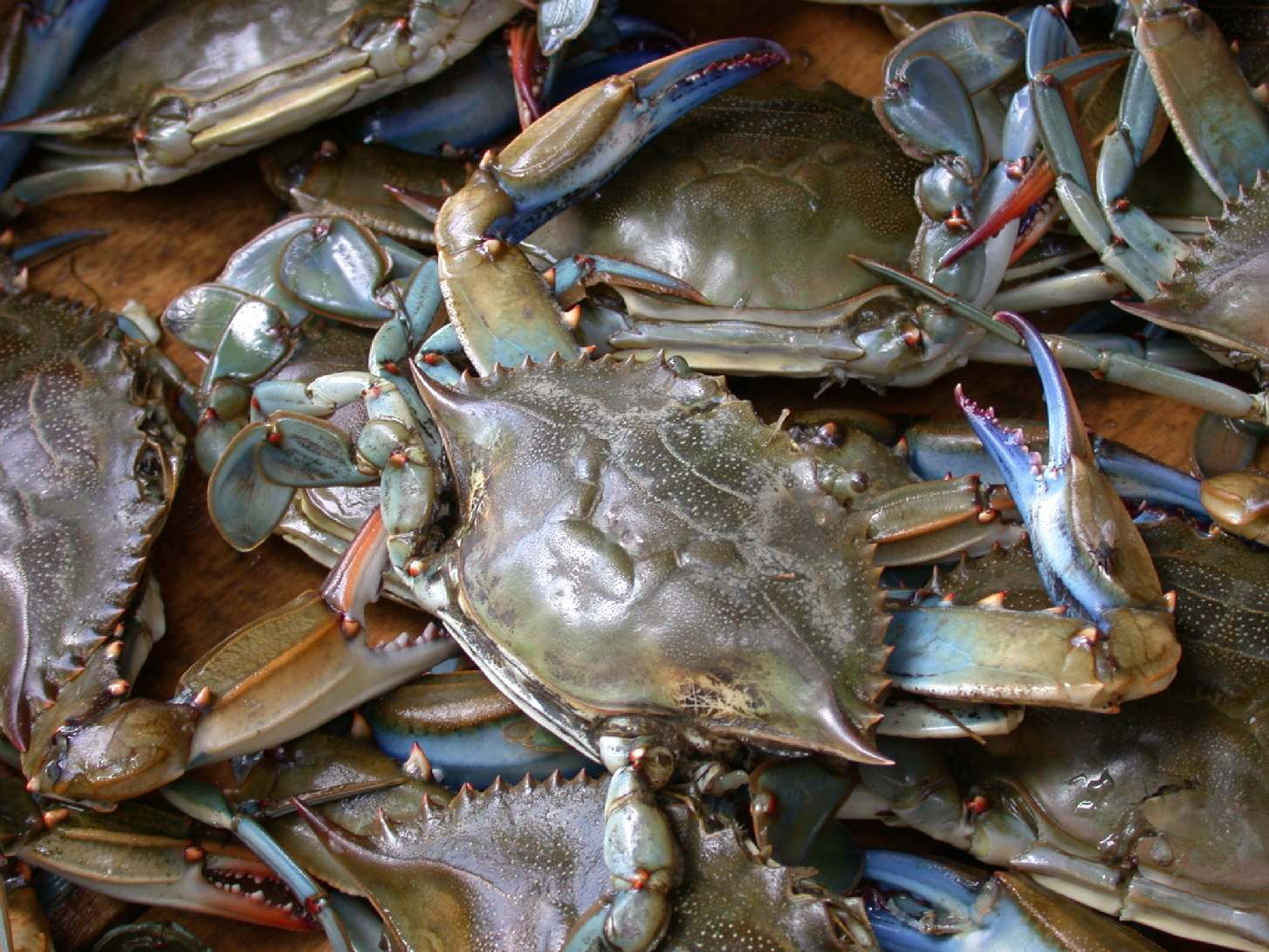

Today, most people who live on Hoopers Island have some connection to the fishing industry. Local families make a living as crabbers, oyster tongers and seafood packers. Seasonal workers from Mexico also work in the processing plants. Because of factors such as water pollution, the fishing industry has been in decline. The number of crabs has decreased significantly, and area governments have enacted a number of laws in order to slow the decline of the crabbing industry. In April 2008, the governors of Maryland and Virginia considered cutting the number of harvested female crabs by one-third. According to an article in The Baltimore Sun, Maryland crabbers opposed this proposal, as it might force some watermen out of the business.

The Department of Natural Resources (DNR) issued new regulations in March 2009 for daily bushel limits for mature female hard crabs and periods of closure for harvest of mature female hard crabs. Mature female hard crab bushel limits were assigned based on license type. The regulation further provided the DNR with the authority to establish and modify a season or catch limit by public notice based on continuous monitoring of stock conditions and harvest rates. The DNR withdrew the portion of the 2009 regulatory proposal that would have required a free registration for crabbers not currently required to have a license.

== Points of interest ==
The Hooper's Island Lighthouse stands off the shores of Upper and Middle Hoopers Island. The lighthouse was built in 1906 and is one of eleven pneumatic caisson lighthouses in the United States.

For over ten years, the Phillips Seafood Factory has been open to visitors. Blue crabs are processed at the factory. Phillips Seafood is a company that owns and operates seafood restaurants along the East Coast. The company's origins date to 1914, when Augustus E. Phillips established its first seafood processing plant on the island.

== Interesting facts ==
- During the 18th century, piracy was rampant in the Chesapeake Bay. As boats, filled with supplies, were headed towards the top of the Bay, they were attacked by pirates who had been hiding in the many tributaries. Lord Dunmore, one of the more infamous pirates, created such mayhem that in 1780, Henry Hooper IV asked the governor of Maryland for assistance to stop the plundering.
- An area near the islands, Meekins Neck, is the site of the first Catholic church in Dorchester County. St. Mary Star of the Sea was built in 1769.
- From the mid-1880s until 1929, there was a steamboat service that went up to Baltimore. The boat left Hoopersville in the late afternoon and arrived in Baltimore at 3:30 am.
