= Harriet Tubman Underground Railroad National Historical Park =

Historical park in Maryland, US

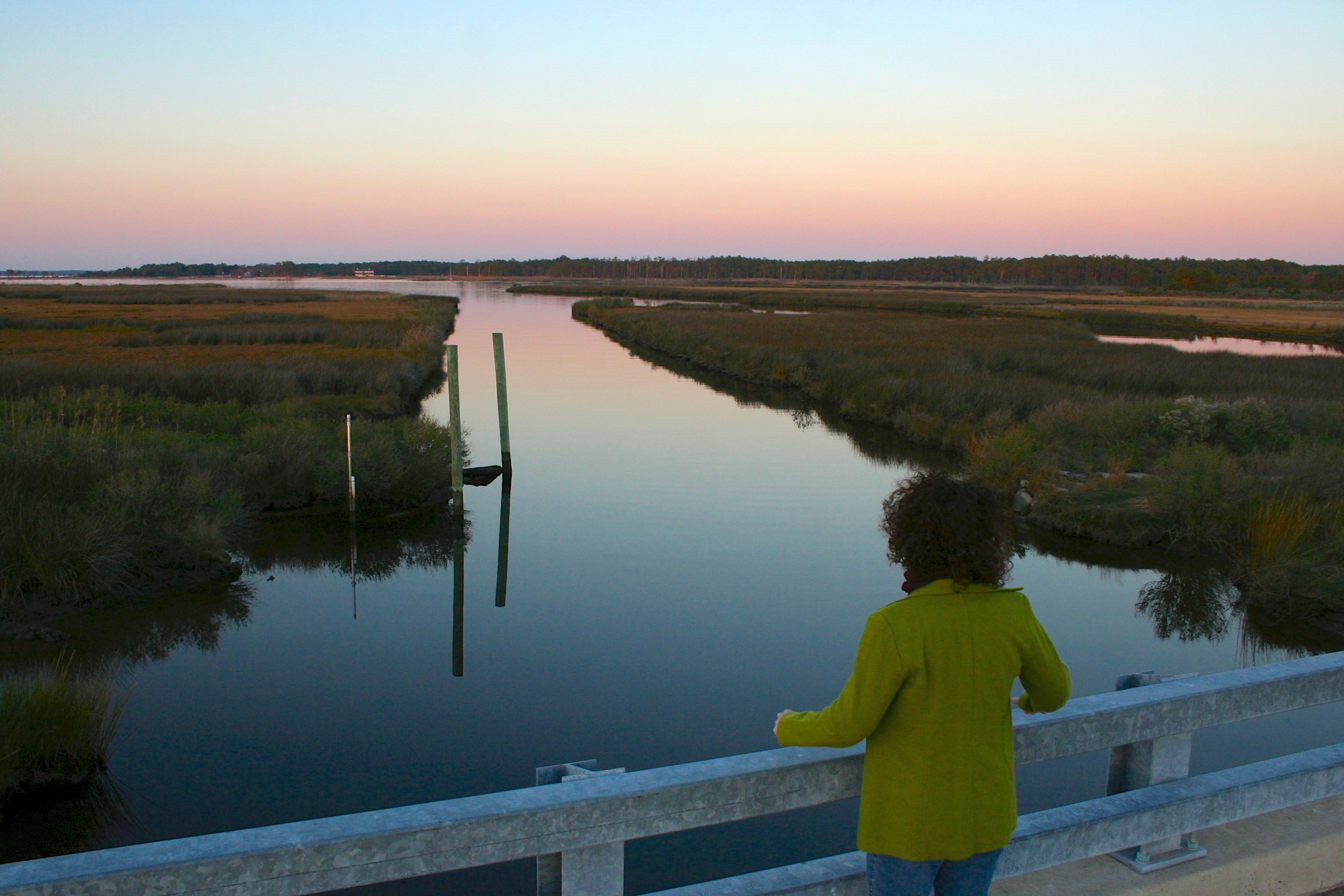

- Location within Maryland Location within the United States
- Location: Dorchester County, Maryland, United States
- Nearest city: Church Creek, Maryland
- Coordinates: 38.4483°N 76.1387°W
- Area: 480 acres (190 ha)
- Established: 2013
- Visitors: 15,348 (in 2025)
- Governing body: National Park Service
- Website: Harriet Tubman Underground Railroad National Historical Park

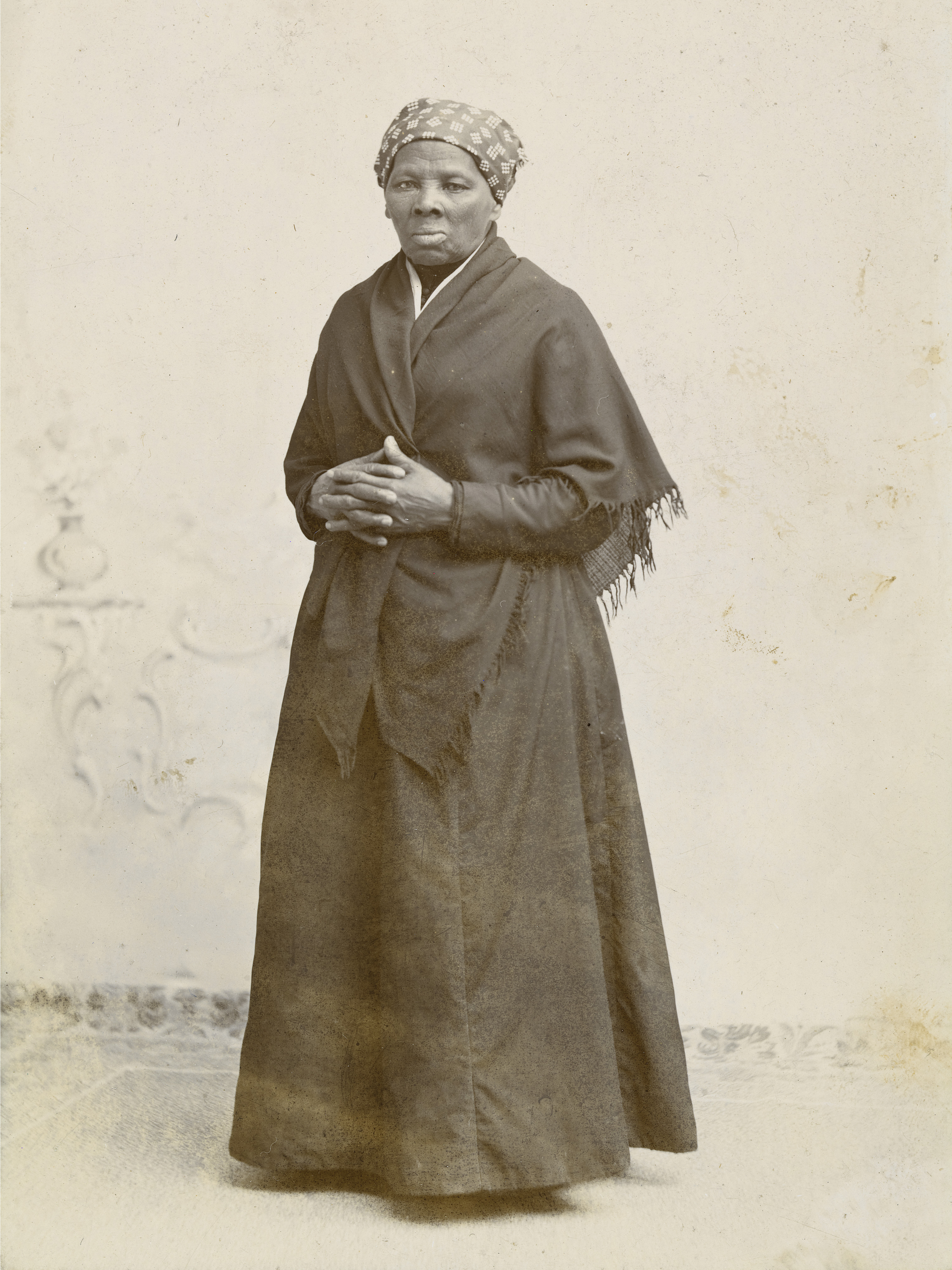
Harriet Tubman, c. 1885

Harriet Tubman Underground Railroad National Historical Park is a 480-acre (190 ha) National Park Service unit in the U.S. state of Maryland. It commemorates the life of former enslaved Harriet Tubman, who became an activist in the Underground Railroad prior to the American Civil War. The Harriet Tubman Underground Railroad National Monument was created by President Barack Obama under the Antiquities Act on March 25, 2013. The portion of the monument administered by the National Park Service was later designated a National Historical Park in 2014, and the remainder is managed by the Fish and Wildlife Service as part of Blackwater National Wildlife Refuge.

== Description ==
The Harriet Tubman Underground Railroad National Historical Park includes sites near Cambridge, Maryland, Windy Hill and Preston, in Dorchester County, Talbot, and Caroline counties, that were significant in Tubman's life. The Park currently includes 480 acres of land known as the Jacob Jackson Home site. The NHP was established by the Carl Levin and Howard P. "Buck" McKeon National Defense Authorization Act FY2015 (Public Law 113–291, December 19, 2014). The legislation authorized the acquisition of an additional 4,207.54 acres in Dorchester, Caroline, and Talbot counties. The Jackson site was donated to the federal government by The Conservation Fund for establishment of the Harriet Tubman Underground Railroad National Monument which later became known as the National Historical Park in accordance with PL 113–291. PL 113-291 also established the Harriet Tubman National Historical Park in Auburn, New York.

== History ==
Prior to establishment of the National Historical Parks in Maryland and New York, the Harriet Tubman Underground Railroad National Monument was created in Dorchester County, Maryland by President Barack Obama under the Antiquities Act on March 25, 2013. Pub. L. 113–291 (text) (PDF) (Section 3035) was subsequently passed and signed into law on December 19, 2014, and required the Secretary of the Interior to "administer the historical park and the portion of the Harriet Tubman Underground Railroad National Monument administered by the National Park Service as a single unit of the National Park System, which shall be known as the 'Harriet Tubman Underground Railroad National Historical Park'." The Harriet Tubman National Historical Park in Auburn and Fleming, New York was established on January 10, 2017, and is a sister park to this one in Maryland.

== See also ==
- Harriet Tubman Underground Railroad Visitor Center
- Harriet Tubman Underground Railroad Byway (Maryland)
- Harriet Tubman Underground Railroad Byway (Delaware)
- Harriet Tubman National Historical Park in New York
- List of national monuments of the United States
- List of Underground Railroad sites
