= Crapo, Maryland =

Unincorporated community in Maryland, United States

- Unincorporated community
- Location within Maryland
- Coordinates: 38°19′11″N 76°07′52″W
- Country: United States
- State: Maryland
- County: Dorchester
- Elevation: 0 ft (0 m)
- Time zone: UTC-5 (Eastern (EST))
  - Summer (DST): UTC-4 (EDT)
- ZIP code: 21626
- Area codes: 410, 443, and 667
- GNIS feature ID: 590040

Crapo is an unincorporated community in Dorchester County, Maryland, United States. Crapo is located along Lakesville-Crapo Road on the east bank of the Honga River in the southern part of the county. It has frequently been noted on lists of unusual place names. The name Crapo comes from "crapaud", which is the French word for toad.
