= Northern copperhead =

Northern copperhead may refer to:

- Agkistrodon contortrix contortrix, a.k.a. the eastern copperhead, a venomous pitviper subspecies found in the United States in the lower Mississippi Valley and the states bordering the Gulf of Mexico, from eastern Texas and southeastern Oklahoma to southern Illinois. On the South Atlantic Coastal Plain from the Florida panhandle to South Carolina.
- Agkistrodon contortrix mokasen, usually referred to as the northern copperhead, a venomous pitviper subspecies found in the eastern United States.
