= Hooper Island Light =

Lighthouse in Maryland, United States

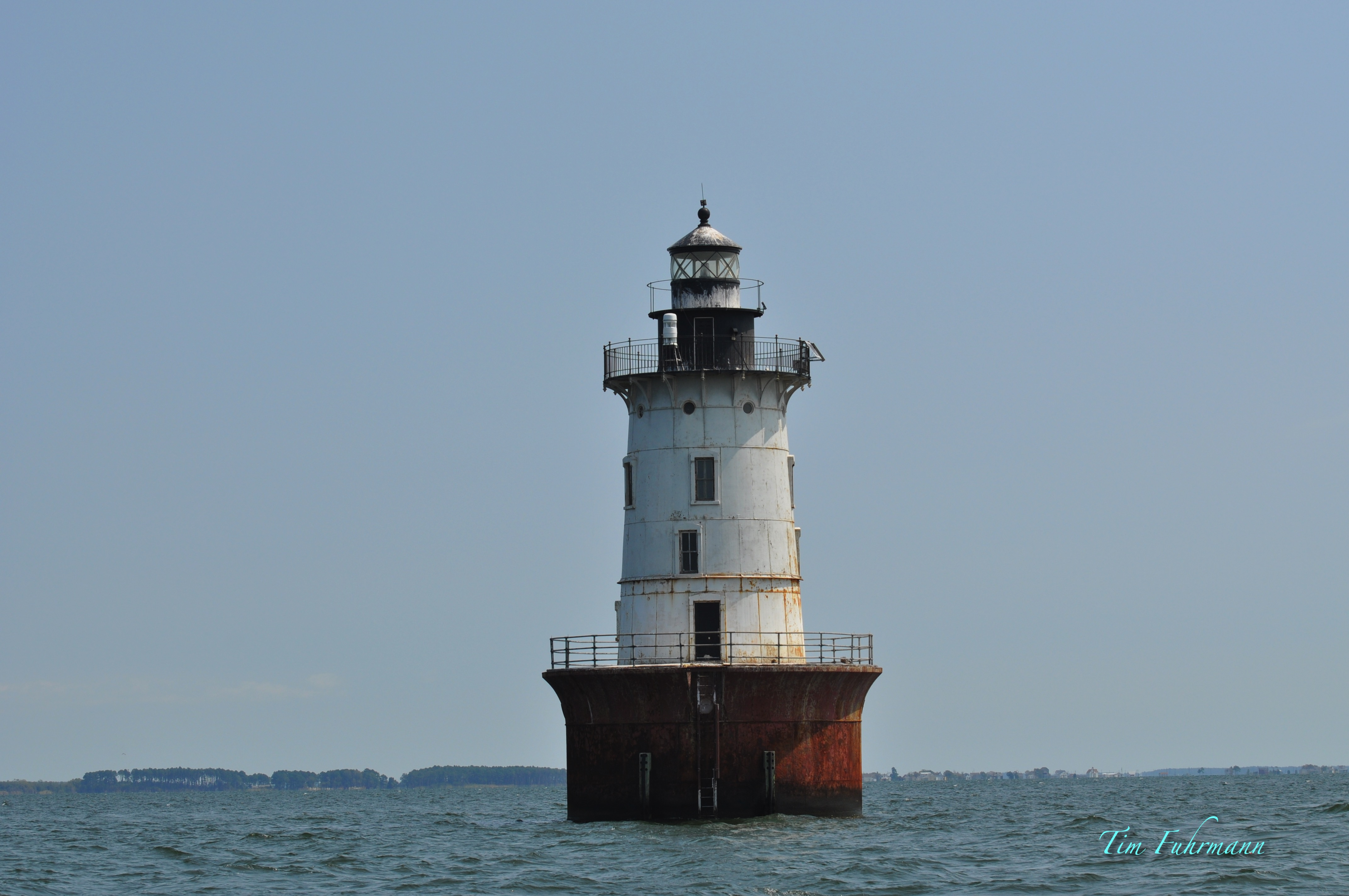
- Hooper Island Light in 2011
- Location: About 3–4 mi (4.8–6.4 km) west of Middle Hooper Island in the Chesapeake Bay
- Coordinates: 38°15′22.5″N 76°14′59.3″W

Tower
- Constructed: 1902
- Foundation: Pneumatic caisson
- Construction: Cast iron lined with brick
- Automated: 1961
- Height: 35 feet (11 m)
- Shape: Round "sparkplug" tower
- Markings: White on brown base
- Heritage: National Register of Historic Places listed place

Light
- First lit: 1902
- Focal height: 63 feet (19 m)
- Lens: Fourth-order Fresnel lens (1902–1976); solar-powered acrylic optic (current)
- Range: 9 nautical miles (17 km; 10 mi)
- Characteristic: Flashing white, every 6 seconds
- USCG no.: 2-7590
- Hooper Island Light Station
- U.S. National Register of Historic Places
- Nearest city: Hooperville, Maryland
- Area: less than one acre
- MPS: Light Stations of the United States MPS
- NRHP reference No.: 02001426
- Added to NRHP: December 2, 2002

The Hooper Island Light is a lighthouse in the Chesapeake Bay, about 3–4 miles (4.8–6.4 km) west of Middle Hooper Island in Maryland. Completed in 1902, it is a cast-iron sparkplug lighthouse built on a caisson sunk using the pneumatic process. It is the only lighthouse of its type in Maryland with both a watch room and a lantern atop the tower. The light was automated in 1961, and the station was listed on the National Register of Historic Places in 2002 as Hooper Island Light Station. The Chesapeake Chapter of the United States Lighthouse Society held the lighthouse from 2009 until 2019. In 2022, the federal government sold it at auction to a private owner. The light remains an active aid to navigation.

== Description ==
The lighthouse stands in about 18 feet (5.5 m) of water, 3–4 miles (4.8–6.4 km) west of Middle Hooper Island. The tower is taller than other Maryland sparkplug lights because it has a watch room as well as a lantern atop the tower, the only example in the state. Built of cast iron lined with brick, the 35 feet (11 m) tower has four living levels topped by the watch room and lantern.

== History ==
=== Construction ===
The Lighthouse Board first requested a light at this site in 1897, and Congress provided $60,000 for it in two allotments in 1898 and 1899. Work was delayed until 1901 after the Variety Iron Works Company failed to deliver materials in time. Unlike earlier caisson lights in the bay, the foundation was placed using the pneumatic process, in which the caisson is kept under pressure to expel water, and the interior is excavated to bring the cylinder down to the desired depth. Construction was completed in 1902, and the light, a fourth-order Fresnel lens made in 1888 by F. Barbier & Company of Paris, was lit on June 1 that year.

=== Operations ===
When the station was electrified in 1936, a diaphragm fog horn was installed. The original 1902 fog bell was kept as a backup. The characteristic was changed several times through the years, with different patterns of flashes and eclipses.

The light was automated on November 21, 1961. In 1976, the original lens was stolen and was replaced with a solar-powered lamp.

=== Ownership and preservation ===
The lighthouse was added to the National Register of Historic Places on December 2, 2002, as Hooper Island Light Station. In 2006, the light station was declared excess federal property under the National Historic Lighthouse Preservation Act. In 2009, it was awarded to the Chesapeake Chapter of the United States Lighthouse Society. The group returned the lighthouse to the federal government in 2019. According to a chapter officer, it had been unable to attract enough volunteers to keep up the work. As of November 2026, the light remains an active aid to navigation, although the Coast Guard does not maintain the structure itself.

=== Sale and restoration ===
In 2022, the General Services Administration (GSA) put the lighthouse up for auction, with a minimum bid of $15,000. GSA spokesman Will Powell said the property's drawbacks included the lack of a dock, water supply, sewage system, electricity or gas. Any owner would also have to maintain it under the rules for structures listed on the National Register of Historic Places. The lighthouse lies in the northeast corner of a U.S. Navy "danger zone", where an agreement between the GSA and the Navy's Naval Air Systems Command prohibits overnight stays.

The auction closed on September 23, 2022, with a winning bid of $192,000. The buyer was Rich Cucé, a real estate investor who owns a Pennsylvania industrial painting company. He set up an organization, The Lighthouse Centers for Technology, History and the Environment, to carry out the restoration. In 2024 Cucé estimated that repairing and upgrading Hooper Island Light would cost about $950,000, including a dock and facilities to make it an educational and environmental research station open to the public.
