= Hoopersville, Maryland =

Unincorporated community in Maryland, U.S.

Coordinates: 38°15′40″N 76°10′48″W

Hoopersville is an unincorporated community in Dorchester County, Maryland, United States. The Hooper Island Light was listed on the National Register of Historic Places in 2002.
