= Blackwater National Wildlife Refuge =

Waterfowl sanctuary in Maryland, U.S.

- IUCN category IV (habitat/species management area)
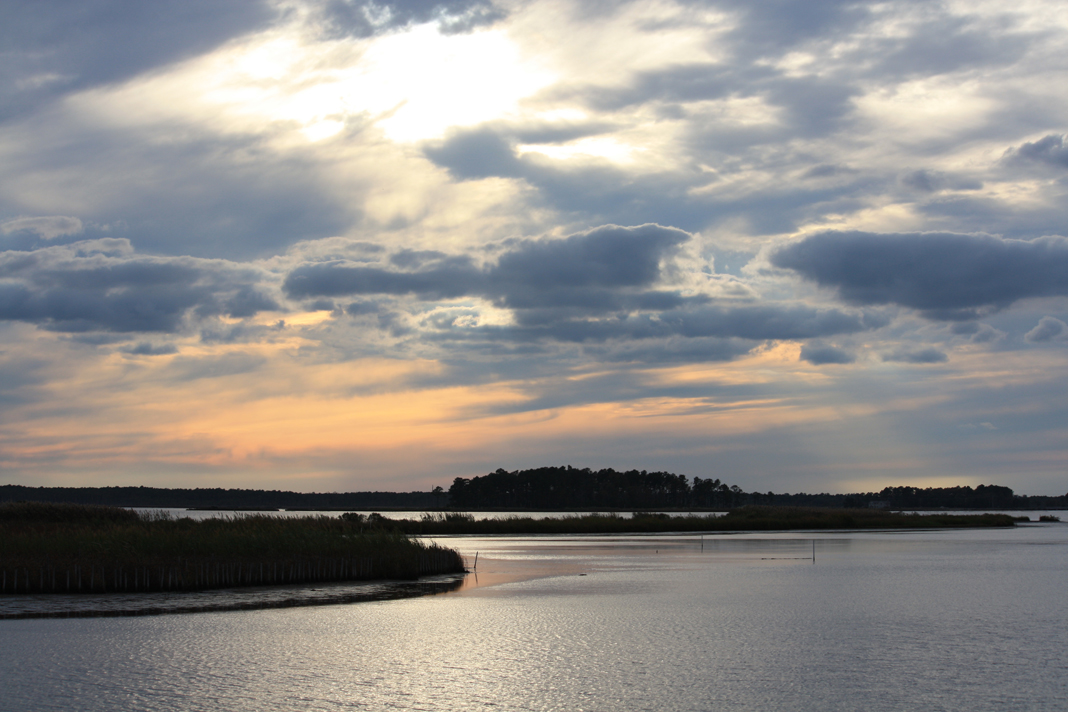
- View from the wildlife drive after a storm.

- Location within Maryland Location within the United States
- Location: Dorchester County, Maryland, U.S.
- Nearest city: Cambridge, Maryland
- Coordinates: 38°24′50″N 76°05′50″W
- Area: 28,894.35 acres (116.9313 km^{2})
- Established: 1933
- Website: www.fws.gov/refuge/Blackwater

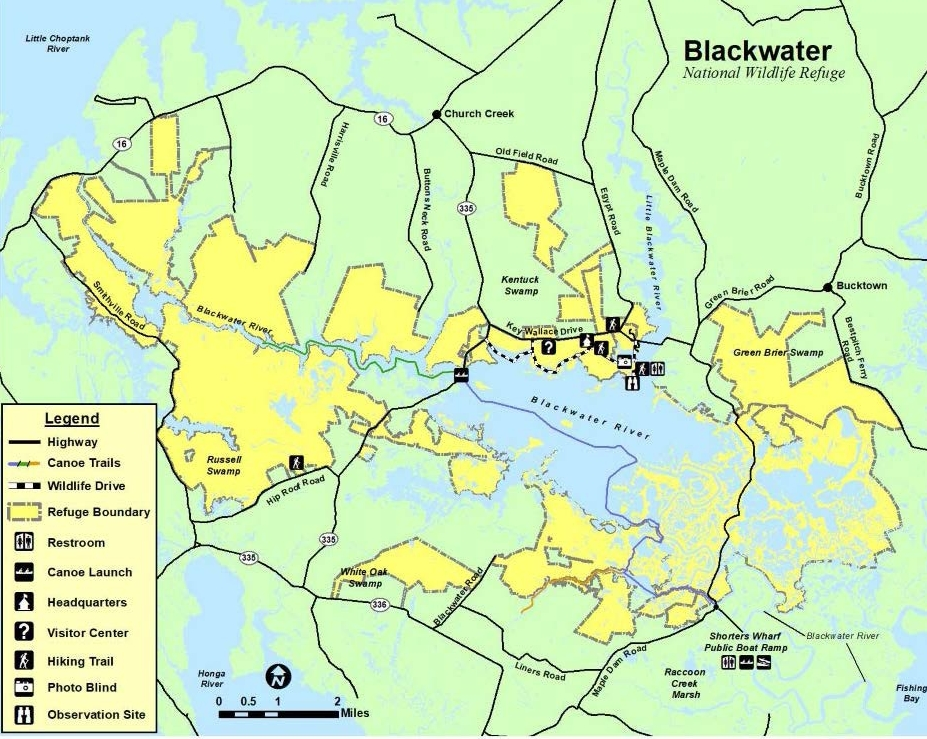
Blackwater National Wildlife Refuge map

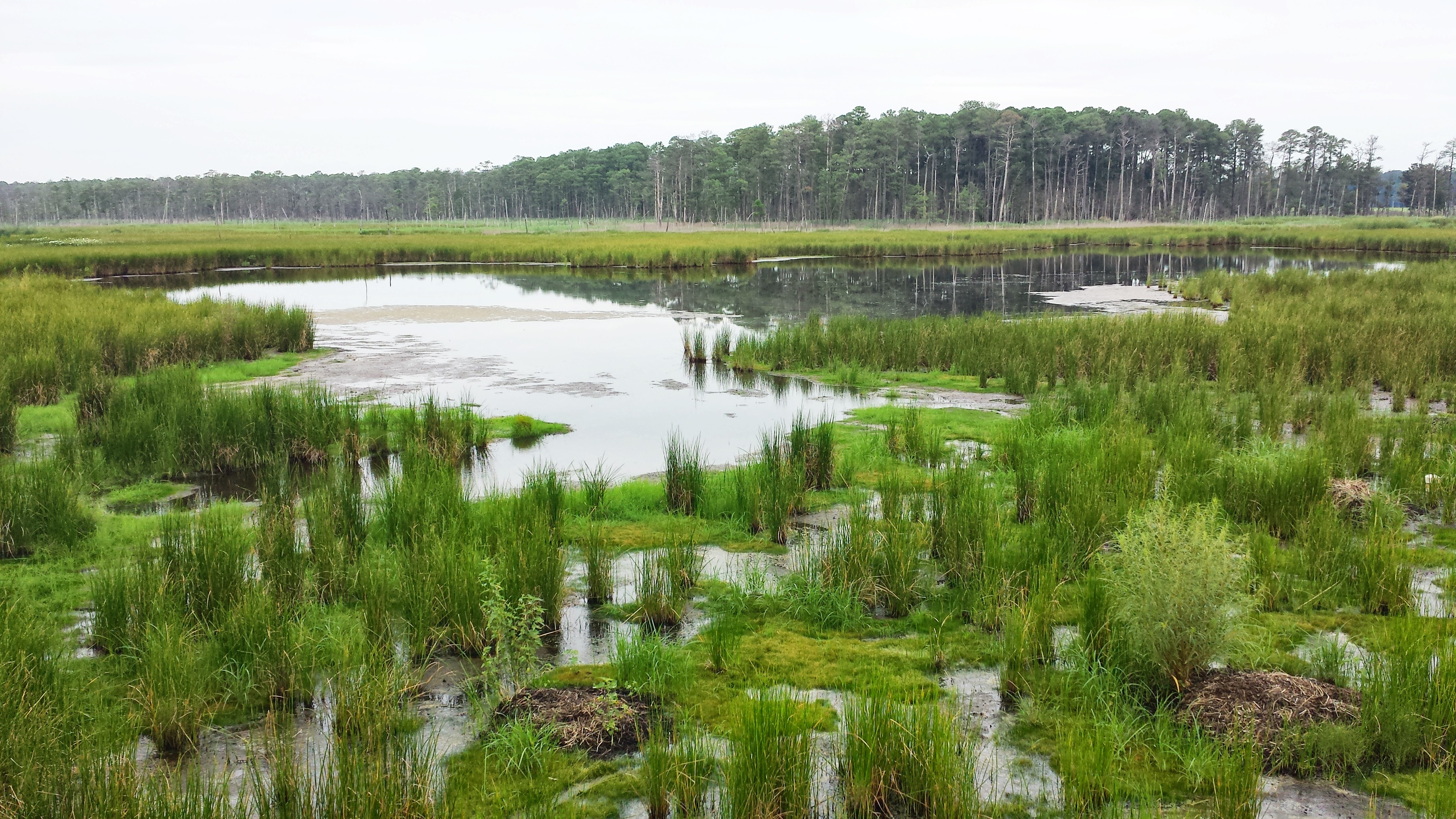
view of Blackwater NWR near the observation platform off the wildlife drive

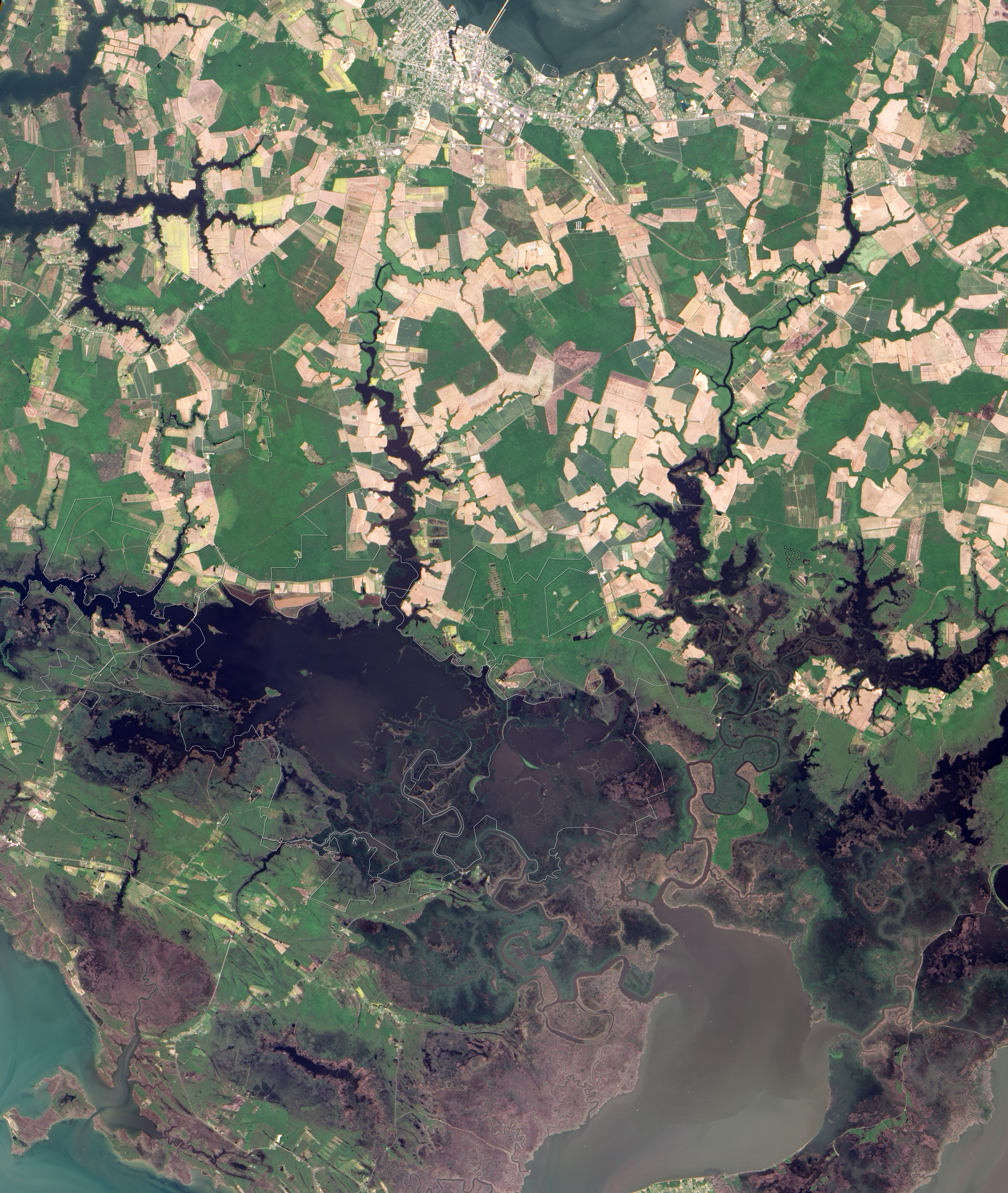
Satellite image of the refuge

The Blackwater National Wildlife Refuge was established in 1933 as a waterfowl sanctuary for birds migrating along the critical migration highway called the Atlantic Flyway. The refuge is located on Maryland's Eastern Shore, just 12 mi (19 km) south of Cambridge, Maryland in Dorchester County, and consists of over 28,000 acres (110 km^{2}) of freshwater impoundments, brackish tidal wetlands, open fields, and mixed evergreen and deciduous forests. Blackwater NWR is one of over 540 units in the National Wildlife Refuge System, which is managed by the United States Fish and Wildlife Service.

Blackwater Refuge is fed by the Blackwater River and the Little Blackwater River. The name "blackwater" comes from the tea-colored waters of the local rivers, which are darkened by the tannin that is picked up as the water drains through peat soil in the marshes.

== Wildlife ==
In addition to a wealth of wetlands and forests, Blackwater Refuge is also host to over 250 bird species, 35 species of reptiles and amphibians, 165 species of threatened and endangered plants, and numerous mammals that can be spotted throughout the year in Blackwater's marshes, forests, meadows, and fields. During winter migration, Blackwater Refuge is also home to upwards of 15,000 geese and 10,000 ducks. The refuge is currently host to three recovered species: the formerly endangered Delmarva fox squirrel, the delisted migrant peregrine falcon, and the recently delisted American bald eagle.

=== Mammals ===
Blackwater Refuge is home to a variety of mammals, which until recently included the South American nutria. Introduced to the refuge in the 1930s, intensive trapping efforts starting in 2002 helped nearly eliminate the animal from the area. Among the mammals is also the Delmarva fox squirrel, considered a formerly endangered species. Blackwater forest management programs are working to protect this squirrel.

Mammals found at Blackwater National Wildlife Refuge include:

- Gray squirrel – common
- Delmarva fox squirrel – common
- Southern flying squirrel – uncommon
- Rice rat – common
- White-footed mouse – common
- Meadow vole – common
- Woodland vole – common
- Muskrat – common
- Nutria – uncommon
- Opossum – common
- Least shrew – common
- Masked shrew – uncommon
- Short-tailed shrew – common
- Starnose mole – common
- Eastern mole – common
- Little brown bat – common
- Big brown bat – uncommon
- Eastern red bat – common
- Evening bat – uncommon
- Eastern cottontail rabbit – common
- Black rat – uncommon
- Norway rat – common
- House mouse – common
- Woodchuck – common
- Red fox – very common
- Gray fox – uncommon
- River otter – uncommon
- Beaver – common
- Longtail weasel – uncommon
- Mink – uncommon
- Striped skunk – common
- Raccoon – very common
- White-tailed deer – very common
- Sika deer – very common

=== Reptiles and amphibians ===
The marshes and swamps of Blackwater provide an ideal living environment for a number of reptiles and amphibians.

Blackwater Refuge's reptiles include:

- northern red-bellied turtle – common
- Eastern painted turtle – common
- Eastern box turtle – common
- Eastern mud turtle – common
- Common musk turtle – common
- Northern diamondback terrapin – common
- Snapping turtle – common
- Spotted turtle – common
- Northern fence lizard – common
- Ground skink – uncommon
- Five-lined skink – common
- Broadhead skink – common
- Black rat snake – common
- Northern black racer – common
- Rough green snake – uncommon
- Eastern garter snake – common
- Eastern hognose snake – uncommon
- Eastern kingsnake – common
- Redbelly water snake – common
- Northern water snake – common
- Northern copperhead – uncommon

Blackwater Refuge's amphibians include:

- Marbled salamander – common
- Red back salamander – common
- Red-spotted newt – uncommon
- Eastern spadefoot – common
- Fowler's toad – common
- Northern cricket frog – common
- Northern spring peeper – common
- Chorus frog – common
- Green treefrog – common
- Gray treefrog – common
- Bullfrog – common
- Southern leopard frog – common
- Pickerel frog – common
- Green frog

=== Birds ===
Blackwater Refuge is a major feeding ground for migrating birds, most abundant being the Canada goose. Swans, cranes, and more than 20 species of duck can be found in its waters. Also of note is the bald eagle, another of the refuge's protected species. The refuge is home to one of the highest concentrations of nesting bald eagles on the Atlantic coast. In all, the refuge is a resting ground for over 200 varieties of bird.

Some of the more common birds to be spotted in Blackwater Refuge are:

- Canada goose
- Wood duck
- American black duck
- Mallard
- Blue-winged teal
- Various scoters
- Northern bobwhite
- Great blue heron
- Various egrets
- Green heron
- Turkey vulture
- Osprey
- Bald eagle
- Northern harrier
- Red-tailed hawk
- Virginia rail
- Killdeer
- Various sandpipers
- Various gulls
- Forster's tern
- Mourning dove
- Yellow-billed cuckoo
- Eastern screech owl
- Great horned owl
- Red-bellied woodpecker
- Eastern wood pewee
- Blue jay
- American crow
- Tree swallow
- Carolina chickadee
- Tufted titmouse
- Carolina wren
- Eastern bluebird
- American robin
- Northern mockingbird
- European starling
- Various warblers
- Northern cardinal
- Red-winged blackbird
- American goldfinch
- House sparrow

=== Bald eagles ===
The most famous wildlife resident in the Blackwater Wildlife Refuge is the bald eagle. The refuge hosts the largest breeding population of bald eagles on the East Coast north of Florida, and during the winter, many eagles migrate to Blackwater Refuge from northern states and from Canada. The Friends of Blackwater website offers a live Eagle Cam that monitors an eagle nest on the refuge.

In addition, the Friends of Blackwater also offer a live Osprey Cam that follows the adventures of a nesting pair of ospreys through the spring and summer.

== Visitor opportunities ==
Blackwater National Wildlife Refuge offers several recreational and visitor opportunities for all age groups. Although much of Blackwater Refuge is composed of wetlands, there are still many ways to get close to the wildlife and to enjoy the scenery.

The refuge features a visitor center on Key Wallace Drive where visitors will find wildlife exhibits, an authentic eagle's nest, Eagle Cam and Osprey Cam TV monitors, the Eagle's Nest Book and Gift Shop, a butterfly garden, restrooms, and maps and brochures that will help visitors make the most of their visit. On the second floor of the Visitor Center is the "Wild Birds Unlimited Pathways to Nature Observatory", which features bird exhibits and spotting scopes for viewing the Blackwater River, the marsh, and the Osprey Cam platform. (The second floor is accessible via a staircase or a handicap-accessible elevator). The staff at the Visitor Center also offer educational programs for children, as well as frequent organized bird walks and an annual Eagle Festival. Access to the refuge is from dawn till dusk.

The heart of Blackwater Refuge can be accessed via the Wildlife Drive, which is a paved road—approximately 3.5 miles (5.6 km) in length (or a 6.5-mile (10.5 km) loop) —that takes visitors along the Blackwater River and offers excellent views of the local wildlife. Visitors can drive, bike, or walk the length of the Drive.

There is a daily permit fee of $3.00 for private vehicles (not including commercial vans or buses) and of $1.00 for pedestrians and bicyclists wishing to access the Wildlife Drive. There are also longer permits and passes available, including a variety of annual passes and a senior citizen pass.

In addition to the Visitor Center and Wildlife Drive, Blackwater Refuge offers three paddling trails, four hiking trails, and hunting, fishing, and crabbing opportunities. There are also other entrances to Blackwater Refuge, making it possible to drive through the refuge without having to take the Wildlife Drive.

About half of the refuge is designated the Harriet Tubman Underground Railroad National Monument. A portion of the area was transferred to the National Park Service in 2014 as the Harriet Tubman Underground Railroad National Historical Park.

== Staff and volunteers ==
The Blackwater Refuge staff is supported by the Friends of Blackwater, which is a non-profit citizen support group that puts in many volunteer hours at the refuge and sponsors various programs and projects throughout the year. In 2003, the Friends of Blackwater were named the "Friends Group of the Year".

== Land use history ==
Under British authority, the Maryland General Assembly of May 1669 recognized Indian ownership of land that is now, in part, Blackwater Reserve. General Assembly recognition came in response to Ababco Hatsawap and Tequassimo tribal leadership messages communicated by the Lower House to the Upper House as a result of a murder trial involving a member of the Wiccomis Nation. The General Assembly observed the Ababco Hatsawap and Tequassimo nations were at risk of being extinguished by persistent Wiccomis Nation and Matwhas Indian attacks without British protection. The friendly tribes sent word that they'd not sold certain land to the English and desired their land on the south shore of the Choptank River to Secretary Sewall's Creek (now Warwick River) be off limits to the English. The General Assembly granted the request in a gesture known as the League of Peace. The tribes, being free to sell this land, did.

The following is from Proceedings and Acts of the General Assembly, April 1666-June 1676, Volume 2, Page 200 (spelling updated):

Be it Enacted by the Right Honorable the Lord Proprietary by and with the advice and Consent of the upper and lower house of this present General Assembly that all that land lying and being on the south side of Choptank River Bounded Westerly by the free-hold now in the Tenure and occupation of William Dorrington. And Easterly with the Creek falling into the said River of Choptank, commonly by the English called or known by the name of Secretary Sewall's Creek for breadth and from the said River side three miles into the woods for length shall be unto the said Ababco, Hatsawap and Tequassimo and the people under their government or Charge and their heirs forever any Law usage Custom or grant to the Contrary hereof in any wise Notwithstanding. To be held of the said Lord Proprietary, his heirs, Lord and Proprietary or Lords and Proprietaries of this Province under the yearly Rent of six Beaver skins to be paid to his said Lordship and his heirs as other Rents in this Province by the English use to be payed.

By 1726, the Ababco Hatawap and Tequassimo nations had sold much of their land. By 1792, their population dwindled (according to William Vans Murray) to a few remaining descendants residing at Locust Point. While the original land parcel is often described as the only "fee-simple Indian Reservation granted by the British," the General Assembly acted to fulfill a request, to protect and keep peace. That legally nothing prevented sale of their land, undoubtedly inspired the legal framework of later reservations.
