= Wingate, Maryland =

Unincorporated community in Maryland, United States

- Unincorporated community
- Location within Maryland
- Coordinates: 38°16′55″N 76°04′55″W
- Country: United States
- State: Maryland
- County: Dorchester
- Elevation: 3 ft (0.91 m)
- Time zone: UTC-5 (Eastern (EST))
  - Summer (DST): UTC-4 (EDT)
- ZIP code: 21675
- Area codes: 410, 443, and 667
- GNIS feature ID: 588298

Wingate is an unincorporated community in Dorchester County, Maryland, United States. Wingate is located along Wingate Bishops Head Road northeast of the Honga River in the southern part of the county.
