= Bishops Head, Maryland =

Coordinates: 38°16′05″N 76°04′04″W

- Unincorporated community
- Interactive map of Bishops Head, Maryland
- Country: United States
- State: Maryland
- County: Dorchester
- Elevation: 3 ft (0.91 m)
- ZIP code: 21672
- Area code: 410

Bishops Head is an unincorporated community in southern Dorchester County, Maryland, United States.
