= Church Creek, Maryland =

- Town
- Location of Church Creek, Maryland
- Coordinates: 38°30′19″N 76°9′16″W
- Country: United States
- State: Maryland
- County: Dorchester
- Incorporated: 1867

Government
  - Type: Town commission
  - Mayor: Robert L. Herbert

Area
  - Total: 0.34 sq mi (0.87 km^{2})
  - Land: 0.34 sq mi (0.87 km^{2})
  - Water: 0 sq mi (0.00 km^{2})
- Elevation: 3.3 ft (1 m)

Population (2020)
  - Total: 102
  - Density: 302/sq mi (116.7/km^{2})
- Time zone: UTC-5 (Eastern (EST))
  - Summer (DST): UTC-4 (EDT)
- ZIP code: 21622
- Area code: 410
- FIPS code: 24-17050
- GNIS feature ID: 0589976
- Website: msa.maryland.gov/msa/mdmanual/37mun/churchcreek/html/c.html

Church Creek is a town in Dorchester County, Maryland, United States, part of the state's Eastern Shore. As of the 2020 census, Church Creek had a population of 102. Church Creek is located approximately six miles south of Cambridge.

Old Trinity Church is located here. An Anglican (now Episcopal) brick church built in 1675, it is the oldest church building in the US in continuous ecclesiastical use.

== Geography ==
Church Creek is located at 38°30′19″N 76°9′16″W (38.505300, −76.154367). The town is located at the head of the Church Creek river, a tributary of the Little Choptank River.

According to the United States Census Bureau, the town has a total area of 0.34 square miles (0.88 km^{2}), all land.

=== Climate ===
The climate in this area is characterized by hot, humid summers and generally mild to cool winters. According to the Köppen Climate Classification system, Church Creek has a humid subtropical climate, abbreviated "Cfa" on climate maps.

== Demographics ==
Historical population
Census	Pop.	Note	%±
1880	331		—
1890	396		19.6%
1950	187		—
1960	146		−21.9%
1970	130		−11.0%
1980	124		−4.6%
1990	113		−8.9%
2000	85		−24.8%
2010	125		47.1%
2020	102		−18.4%
U.S. Decennial Census

=== 2010 census ===
As of the census of 2010, there were 125 people, 59 households, and 37 families residing in the town. The population density was 367.6 inhabitants per square mile (141.9/km^{2}). There were 67 housing units at an average density of 197.1 per square mile (76.1/km^{2}). The racial makeup of the town was 89.6% White, 6.4% African American, 0.8% from other races, and 3.2% from two or more races. Hispanic or Latino of any race were 4.8% of the population.

There were 59 households, of which 23.7% had children under the age of 18 living with them, 47.5% were married couples living together, 11.9% had a female householder with no husband present, 3.4% had a male householder with no wife present, and 37.3% were non-families. 32.2% of all households were made up of individuals, and 15.3% had someone living alone who was 65 years of age or older. The average household size was 2.12 and the average family size was 2.65.

The median age in the town was 47.8 years. 16% of residents were under the age of 18; 9.6% were between the ages of 18 and 24; 20% were from 25 to 44; 32% were from 45 to 64; and 22.4% were 65 years of age or older. The gender makeup of the town was 44.8% male and 55.2% female.

=== 2000 census ===
As of the census of 2000, there were 85 people, 41 households, and 25 families residing in the town. The population density was 271.4 inhabitants per square mile (104.8/km^{2}). There were 45 housing units at an average density of 143.7 per square mile (55.5/km^{2}). The racial makeup of the town was 100.00% White.

There were 41 households, out of which 24.4% had children under the age of 18 living with them, 48.8% were married couples living together, 9.8% had a female householder with no husband present, and 36.6% were non-families. 36.6% of all households were made up of individuals, and 17.1% had someone living alone who was 65 years of age or older. The average household size was 2.07 and the average family size was 2.69.

In the town, the population was spread out, with 23.5% under the age of 18, 1.2% from 18 to 24, 29.4% from 25 to 44, 21.2% from 45 to 64, and 24.7% who were 65 years of age or older. The median age was 42 years. For every 100 females, there were 93.2 males. For every 100 females age 18 and over, there were 85.7 males.

The median income for a household in the town was $25,750, and the median income for a family was $26,875. Males had a median income of $21,250 versus $16,250 for females. The per capita income for the town was $19,700. None of the population and none of the families were below the poverty line.

== History ==
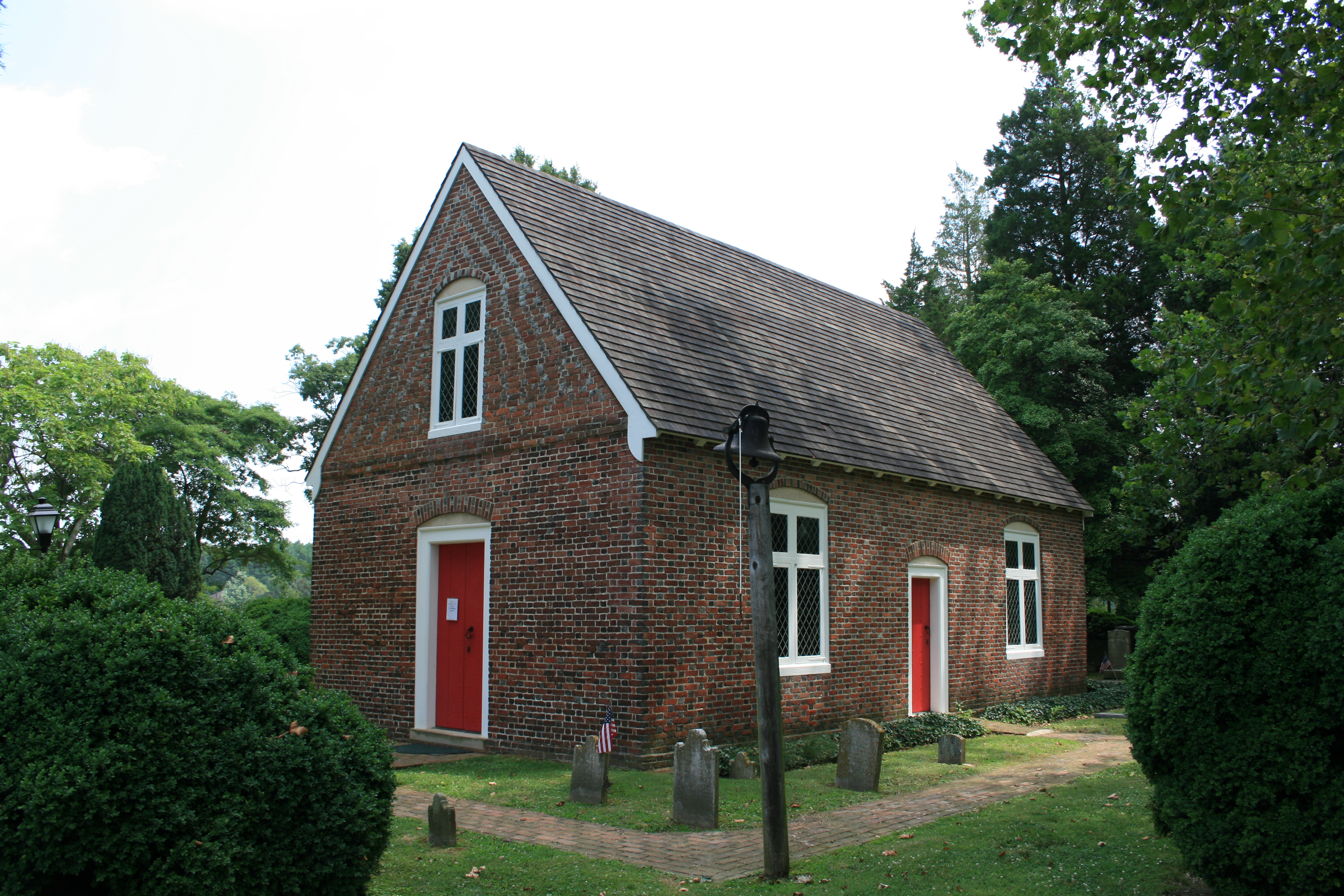
Old Trinity Church was built c. 1675

The exact origins of Church Creek remain unclear. Popular tradition maintains that Church Creek predates Cambridge, Maryland as the earliest settlement in Dorchester County, and was first established at some point before 1684 under the name Dorchester Town and then White Haven. This has been disputed by historian Elias Jones, who found no indication of land sales in the area before 1700 in County Land Records.

Both the town and river of Church Creek derive their name from the nearby Episcopal church, now known as Old Trinity Church, built c. 1675. In 1867, Church Creek officially became the forty-second Incorporated town in Maryland, and remains one of the 123 such towns today. In 1975, the town adopted its first municipal tax in order to qualify for state tax grants and federal revenue-sharing.

=== Economy ===
The first major industry in Church Creek was shipbuilding, established at some point before 1767, which took advantage of surrounding forests plentiful with white oak and pine. As a result, the population of the town grew during the 18th and 19th centuries. The 1860 census recorded 218 families and 1,103, of which 51 percent were occupied as "laborers" and 26 percent occupied as "farmers".

Toward the end of the 19th century, regional deforestation resulted in a downturn in the wooden shipbuilding industry. This adversely affected the industrial prosperity of Church Creek, and the population subsequently declined. The economy of Church Creek has historically benefited from human traffic due to the town's location at the crossroads of Taylor's Island Road (Route 16) and Church Creek-Golden Hill Road (Route 335). During the first half of the twentieth century, the residents of Church Creek maintained eight or nine general stores. But during the second half of the 20th century, the town's economy and population continued to decline. According to the United States Census Records, the town contained 187 people in 1950, down to 115 in 1990.

=== African-American education during Reconstruction ===
Following the American Civil War, Church Creek was an early site for education of African Americans. The state passed the Public Instruction Act of 1865 to earmark public funds for the education of African-American students. But white-dominated Maryland county and city school boards refused to distribute the allocated money for the building and maintenance of African-American schools in the segregated system.

Instead, private organizations, such as the northern American Missionary Association, spearheaded the raising and allocation of money throughout Maryland. The fifth African-American county school was established in Church Creek on September 27, 1865 under the care of Mary S. Osbourne, with a total enrollment of thirty-two students. The County schools were quickly opposed by local residents, sometimes violently. In October and November 1865, arsonists destroyed African-American schools in Millington, Edesville, and Kent County.

Though the school at Church Creek was not attacked, it did encounter local antagonism. In December 1865, a group of Church Creek residents held an "indignation meeting" to organize and communicate their opposition to the African-American school and its teacher, Mary S. Osbourne. The Church Creek school for African-American students operated successfully throughout the 1865–66 school year. As teacher Mary S. Osbourne reported: "One class of six knew the alphabet but could not read at all; now they read well, as far as First Step No. 12 on the Chart. … A class of seven read well in the First Reader, and are to commence Arithmetic at once. Another … [is] using the Third Reader and studying Geography." From 1861 to 1876 more than one-third of teachers in southern colored schools were African Americans, so it is likely that Osbourne was replaced by a southern African American teacher even during Reconstruction. In addition, one of every six teachers from the North were African American.
